= List of Mister Venezuela titleholders =

Mister Venezuela titleholders

The following is a list of men who have won the Mister Venezuela title. Mister Venezuela is a Venezuelan beauty pageant that has been held annually since 1996 to select the entrant from Venezuela in the Mister World pageant.

== Mister Venezuela titleholders ==
Three Mister Venezuela winners have gone on to become international winners, one Mister World, one Manhunt International and one Mister Suprantional, who are indicated in bold face.

Color key

- Declared as winner
- Ended as runner-up
- Ended as top 5/8 qualification
- Ended as one of the finalists or semifinalists
- Ended as special awards winner

Year	Represented	Titleholder	Birth	Age (Note: Ages at the time of Miss Venezuela)	Hometown	Location	Date	Entrants	Placement (Note: Placements only applied for the Big 7 pageants (Mister World, Manhunt International, Mister International, Mister Universe, Mister Global, Mister Supranational and Man of the World).)
1996	Zulia (No. 20)	José Gregorio Faría	April 19, 1972	24	Maracaibo	Venevisión Studios, Caracas	July 17, 1996	20	Unplaced in Mister World 1996
**1997**	**Distrito Federal (No. 11)**	**Sandro Finoglio**	**January 3, 1973**	**24**	**Caracas**	Venevisión Studios, Caracas	**April 8, 1997**	**20**	**1st Runner-Up in Manhunt International 1997; Mister World 1998**
**1998**	**Distrito Federal (No. 15)**	**Ernesto Calzadilla**	**September 5, 1974**	**23**	**Caracas**	Venevisión Studios, Caracas	**October 29, 1998**	**24**	**Manhunt International 1999**
1999	Distrito Federal (No. 20)	Alejandro Otero	January 2, 1974	25	Caracas	Venevisión Studios, Caracas	November 4, 1999	26	Top 10 in Mister World 2000
2000	Península Goajira	Luis Nery	February 20, 1978	22	Cabimas	Venevisión Studios, Caracas	November 21, 2000	26	2nd Runner-up in Manhunt International 2001
2001	Vargas	Daniel Navarrete	March 28, 1977	24	Caracas	Venevisión Studios, Caracas	November 6, 2001	25	4th Runner-up in Manhunt International 2002
2003	Carabobo	Andrés Mistage	September 11, 1981	21	Valencia	Venevisión Studios, Caracas	July 26, 2003	16	Top 10 in Mister World 2003
2004	Amazonas	Francisco León	September 24, 1981	23	Caracas	Venevisión Studios, Caracas	June 19, 2004	22	
2005	Zulia (resigned)	José Ignacio Rodríguez	March 17, 1979	26	Maracaibo	Venevisión Studios, Caracas	June 18, 2005	20	
2006	Distrito Capital (No. 4)	Vito Gasparrini	December 17, 1975	30	Caracas	Venevisión Studios, Caracas	September 23, 2006	6	Unplaced in Mister World 2007
2009	Distrito Capital	José Manuel Flores	September 25, 1986	22	Caracas	N/A	September 2009	N/A	Top 15 in Mister World 2010
2012	Táchira	Jessus Zambrano	December 22, 1989	22	Abejales	N/A	September 20, 2012	N/A	Unplaced in Mister World 2012
2014	Barinas (No. 12)	Jesús Casanova	November 18, 1988	25	Barinas	Venevisión Studios, Caracas	May 24, 2014	12	Unplaced in Mister World 2014
**2015**	**Aragua (No. 13)**	**Gabriel Correa**	**February 17, 1989**	**26**	**Maracay**	Venevisión Studios, Caracas	**May 23, 2015**	**14**	**Mister Supranational 2017**
2016	Aragua (No. 6)	Renato Barabino	March 19, 1998	18	Maracay	Venevisión Studios, Caracas	May 28, 2016	14	Did not compete in Mister World 2016
2017	Distrito Capital (No. 13)	Christian Nunes	June 7, 1993	24	Caracas	Venevisión Studios, Caracas	June 10, 2017	14	Unplaced in Mister Universe 2015; Top 10 in Mister Global 2018
2019	Zulia (No. 9)	Jorge Eduardo Núñez	September 23, 1994	24	Cabimas	Venevisión Studios, Caracas	April 13, 2019	14	Top 29 in Mister World 2019; Unplaced (Top 25) in Mister Supranational 2023
2024	Carabobo (No. 9)	Juan Alberto García	March 9, 1999	25	Valencia	Venevisión Studios, Caracas	July 13, 2024	14	Top 10 in Mister World 2024

Notes

- Two winners were appointed: José Manuel Flores in 2009 and Jessus Zambrano in 2012.

=== Winners by state/region ===
State	Number	Years
Distrito Capital	6	1997; 1998; 1999; 2006; 2009; 2017
Carabobo	2	2003; 2024
Zulia	2	1996; 2005 (Note: Resigned but the title was not passed to a runner-up); 2019
Aragua	2	2015; 2016
Barinas	1	2014
Táchira	1	2012
Amazonas	1	2004
Vargas	1	2001
Península Goajira	1	2000

The state who later won the Mister World, Manhunt International or Mister Supranational titles indicated in bold
The state later resigned the Mister Venezuela title indicated in italics

Debut wins

Not including states who were inherited the title.

Debut wins timeline
Decade	States/Federal District
1990s	List: 1996: Zulia; 1997: Distrito Capital
2000s	List: 2000: Península Guajira; 2001: Vargas; 2003: Carabobo; 2004: Amazonas
2010s	List: 2012: Táchira; 2014: Barinas

=== States have yet to win Mister Venezuela ===
There have been no Mister Venezuela winners from the following states:

- Anzoátegui
- Apure
- Bolívar
- Cojedes
- Delta Amacuro
- Falcón
- Guárico
- Lara
- Mérida
- Miranda
- Monagas
- Nueva Esparta
- Portuguesa
- Sucre
- Trujillo
- Yaracuy

=== Winners by geographical region ===
Region	Titles	Years
Capital	7	1997, 1998, 1999, 2001, 2006, 2009, 2017
Central	4	2003, 2015, 2016, 2024
Zulian	3	1996, 2000, 2005, 2019
Andean	2	2012, 2014
Guayana	1	2004
Central-Western	0	
Eastern	0	
Insular	0	
Llanos	0	

=== Winners by age ===
Age	Titles	Years
24	5	1996, 1997, 2001, 2017, 2019
25	3	1999, 2014, 2024
22	3	2000, 2009, 2012
26	2	2005, 2015
23	2	1998, 2004
18	1	2016
30	1	2006
21	1	2003

== Venezuelan titleholders at international pageants ==
Color key

- Declared as winner
- Ended as runner-up
- Ended as top 5/8 qualification
- Ended as one of the finalists or semifinalists
- Ended as special awards winner

=== Mister World Venezuela ===
Year	Represented	Titleholder	Birth	Age	Hometown	Location	Date	Entrants	Placement
1996	Zulia (No. 20)	José Gregorio Faría	April 19, 1972	24	Maracaibo	Anadolu Auditorium, Şişli, Istanbul, Turkey	September 20, 1996	50	Unplaced
1998	Distrito Federal (No. 11)	Sandro Finoglio	January 3, 1973	25	Caracas	Tróia Peninsula, Grândola, Portugal	September 18, 1998	43	1st Runner-Up in Manhunt International 1997; Mister World 1998
2000	Distrito Federal (No. 20)	Alejandro Otero	January 2, 1974	26	Caracas	Crieff Hydro Hotel, Perthshire, Scotland	October 13, 2000	32	Top 10
2003	Carabobo	Andrés Mistage	September 11, 1981	21	Valencia	Brewery Hall, London, England	August 9, 2003	38	Top 10
2007	Distrito Capital (No. 4)	Vito Gasparrini	December 17, 1975	31	Caracas	Crown of Beauty Theatre, Sanya, China	March 31, 2007	56	Unplaced
2010	Distrito Capital	José Manuel Flores^{[α]}	September 25, 1986	23	Caracas	Songdo Convensia, Incheon, South Korea	March 27, 2010	74	Top 15
2012	Táchira	Jessus Zambrano^{[α]}	December 22, 1989	22	Abejales	Kent Showground, Kent, England	November 24, 2012	48	Unplaced
2014	Barinas (No. 12)	Jesús Casanova	November 18, 1988	25	Barinas	Torbay, England	June 15, 2014	46	Unplaced
2016	Aragua (No. 6)	Renato Barabino	March 19, 1998	18	Maracay	Southport Theatre and Convention Centre, Southport, England	July 19, 2016	46	Did not compete
2019	Zulia (No. 9)	Jorge Eduardo Núñez	September 23, 1994	24	Cabimas	Araneta Coliseum, Quezon City, Philippines	August 23, 2019	72	Top 29; Unplaced (Top 25) in Mister Supranational 2023
2024	Carabobo (No. 9)	Juan Alberto García	March 9, 1999	25	Valencia	NovaWorld Phan Thiết, Bình Thuận, Vietnam	November 23, 2024	60	Top 10

Notes

- ^α Designated.

=== Manhunt Venezuela ===
Year	Represented	Titleholder	Birth	Age	Hometown	Location	Date	Entrants	Placement
Did not compete between 1993–1995
1997	Distrito Federal (No. 11)	Sandro Finoglio	January 3, 1973	24	Caracas	Singapore, Singapore	May 24, 1997	38	1st Runner-Up; Mister World 1998
1998		Jossman Peñalver				Gold Coast, Australia	May 3, 1998	35	Unplaced
1999	Distrito Federal (No. 15)	Ernesto Calzadilla	September 5, 1974	24	Caracas	Manila, Philippines	May 29, 1999	43	Manhunt International 1999
2000	Distrito Federal (No. 11)	José Gabriel Madonía	June 1, 1977	23	Caracas	Singapore, Singapore	September 29, 2000	33	3rd Runner-Up
2001	Península Goajira	Luis Nery	February 20, 1978	23	Cabimas	Beijing, China	November 12, 2001	43	2nd Runner-up
2002	Vargas	Daniel Navarrete	March 28, 1977	25	Caracas	Shanghai, China	December 14, 2002	47	4th Runner-up
2005	Anzoátegui	Claudio de la Torre	November 22, 1980	24	Barcelona	Busan, South Korea	September 8, 2005	42	Top 15
2006	Lara	Miguel Ángel Brito		24	Barquisimeto	Jinjiang, China	April 20, 2006	53	Top 15
2007	Distrito Capital	Germán González	February 18, 1981	25	San Antonio de Los Altos	Gangwon, South Korea	February 10, 2007	47	Unplaced
2008	Distrito Capital	Orlando Delgado	September 13, 1989	18	Caracas	Seoul, South Korea	June 2, 2008	47	Top 15
2010	Aragua	Henry Bolívar		21		Taichung, Taiwan	November 20, 2010	51	Top 16
2011	Bolívar	José Antonio Ampueda	November 12, 1987	23	Puerto Ordaz	Imperial Palace Hotel, Seoul, South Korea	November 10, 2011	48	Unplaced
2012	Nueva Esparta	Jeyco Estaba	September 30, 1985	27	Caracas	Scala Theatre, Siam Square, Bangkok, Thailand	November 9, 2012	53	Top 15
2016	Táchira	Francisco Gil	June 13, 1989	27	Valera	OCT Harbour City, Shenzhen, China	October 29, 2016	43	Top 16
2017	Vargas	Anderson Tovar (Note: Anderson José Tovar Suárez was selected to attend Manhunt International 2017, but did not finalize his participation.)		25		Bangkok, Thailand	November 27, 2017	40	Did not compete
Did not compete between 2017–2020
2022	Distrito Capital	José Luis Trujillo	August 14, 1995	27	Caracas	Okada Manila, Manila, Philippines	October 1, 2022	34	Top 16
2024	Distrito Capital	Víctor Battista	September 29, 1995	28	Caracas	Ayutthaya, Philippines	May 26, 2024	37	3rd Runner-Up
2025	Distrito Capital	Sergio Gómez	June 6, 1994	31	Petare	Bangkok, Thailand	June 10, 2025	37	Top 20

=== Mister International Venezuela ===
Year	Represented	Titleholder	Birth	Age	Hometown	Location	Date	Entrants	Placement
2006	Miranda	Javier Delgado	February 6, 1984	22	Caracas	The Pavillion, Singapore	October 7, 2006	19	1st Runner-Up
2007	Distrito Capital	Alberto García	May 3, 1984	23	Caracas	Sarawak Chamber Ballroom, Kuching, Malaysia	December 31, 2007	17	3rd Runner-Up
2008	Canaima	Marco Antonio Chinea				Tainan, Taiwan	November 24, 2008	30	Top 10
2009	Península de Paraguaná	Luis Nuzzo	February 25, 1979	30	Petare	Plaza International Hotel, Taichung, Taiwan	December 19, 2009	29	Top 10
2010		Francisco Sánchez				Central Park Jakarta, Jakarta, Indonesia	November 30, 2010	40	Top 15
2011	Mérida	Jeefry Rojas		25		Patravadi Theatre in The Garden, Bangkok, Thailand	December 17, 2011	33	Top 10
2012	Distrito Capital	Gary Pinha		29		Espanade Movie Complex, Bangkok, Thailand	November 24, 2012	38	Top 16
2013	Apure	José Anmer Paredes	December 4, 1984	28	Guasdualito	Skenoo Hall, Ganadaria City, Jakarta Indonesia	November 21, 2013	38	Mister International 2013
2014	Mérida	Yarnaldo Morales (Note: Yarnaldo Rey José Morales Tovar would attend Mister International 2014, however, due to lack of funds to cover his travel expenses to South Korea, he would withdraw from the competition. Morales would previously compete at Mister Universo World 2013 in Lima, Peru, taking second place as 'Virrey'.)	October 18, 1988	26	Caracas	Hotel Inter-Burgo Grand Ballroom, Ansan, South Korea	February 14, 2015	29	Did not compete
2015	Lara	Rafael Angelucci	December 11, 1992	22	Barquisimeto	Newport Performing Arts Theater, Manila, Philippines	November 30, 2015	36	Top 10
2016	Zulia	Walfred Crespo	March 12, 1994	19	Cabimas	The Stage Aisatique the Riverfront, Bangkok, Thailand	February 13, 2017	35	Top 16
2017	Distrito Capital	Ignacio Milles (Note: Elvis De Oliveira would be the initial representative in Mister Internacional 2017, who would be replaced by Luis Marrero. Although in the end, Ignacio Milles was the one who represented the country in said contest.)	July 27, 1990	27	Caracas	National Theater of Yangon, Yangon, Myanmar	April 30, 2018	36	Top 10
2018	Aragua	Francesco Piscitelli	April 23, 1997	21	Maracay	One Esplanade, Pasay, Philippines	February 24, 2019	39	1st Runner-Up
2022	Falcón	Orangel Dirinot	November 10, 1995	26	Coro	New Frontier Theater, Quezon City, Metro Manila, Philippines	October 30, 2022	35	2nd Runner-Up
2023	Zulia	William Badell	June 29, 1996	27	Maracaibo	Crystal Design Center Ballroom, Khwaeng Khlong Chan, Bangkok, Thailand	September 17, 2023	36	1st Runner-Up; 2nd Runner-Up in Mister Supranational 2021
2024	Distrito Capital	Enmanuel Serrano	October 3, 1992	32	Caracas	Bangkok, Thailand	December 14, 2024	47	Top 15
2025	Distrito Capital	Anthony Gallardo		33	Caracas	Nonthaburi, Thailand	September 25, 2025	42	Unplaced

=== Mister Universe Venezuela ===
Year	Represented	Titleholder	Birth	Age	Hometown	Location	Date	Entrants	Placement
2008	Cojedes	Julio Sánchez-Vega	September 9, 1984	23	El Hatillo	Santo Domingo, Dominican Republic	March 12, 2008	21	Top 10
2009	Did not compete								
2010	Guárico	Édgar Moreno	November 12, 1985	24	Rubio	Punta Cana, Dominican Republic	May 8, 2010	33	3rd Runner-Up
2011	Nueva Esparta	Juan Pablo Gómez	February 23, 1987	24	Boca del Río	Punta Cana, Dominican Republic	May 14, 2011	42	Mister Universe 2011
2012	Monagas	Julio César Torres	May 17, 1988	24	Maturín	Santo Domingo, Dominican Republic	July 12, 2012	27	4th Runner-Up
2013	Guárico	Christian Rodríguez		22	Naiguatá	Santiago de los Caballeros, Dominican Republic	May 31, 2013	29	Top 12
2014	Distrito Capital	José Luis Fernández		24	Caracas	Santo Domingo, Dominican Republic	June 10, 2014	27	1st Runner-Up
2015	Sucre	Christian Nunes	June 7, 1993	22	Caracas	Santo Domingo, Dominican Republic	June 21, 2015	35	Unplaced; Top 10 in Mister Global 2018
2016	Delta Amacuro	Luis Domingo Báez	March 14, 1997	19	Caracas	Punta Cana, Dominican Republic	July 15, 2016	30	1st Runner-Up
2017	Táchira	Jesús Zambrano	January 22, 1993	24	La Grita	Punta Cana, Dominican Republic	June 16, 2017	39	Unplaced
2018	Miranda	Jaime Betancourt	July 4, 1997	21	Los Teques	San Felipe, Puerto Plata, Dominican Republic	July 27, 2018	36	2nd Runner-Up
2019	Bolívar	Luis Enrique Rodríguez	May 28, 1992	27	Puerto Ordaz	San Felipe, Puerto Plata, Dominican Republic	August 10, 2019	25	Top 15
→ New pageant called The Mister Universe, no longer based in Santo Domingo, Domnican Republic
2024	Zulia	Manuel Alejandro Polanco	September 23		Maracaibo	The Fonda Theatre, Los Angeles, United States	December 22, 2024	13	Unplaced

Mister Universo Isla de Margarita
Represented
List
- 2008: Francisco Diaz – Unplaced
- 2011: Carlos Martínez – Unplaced
- 2013: Octavio Centeno – Unplaced
- 2014: Edward Rojas – Unplaced (Mr. Congeniality)
- 2015: Mariano Palacios – Unplaced
- 2016: Florentino Rodríguez – Unplaced
- 2017: Douglas Castro – 5th Runner-Up
- 2018: Jesús Urdaneta – Top 12 (Mr. Elegance)
- 2019: Carlos Guédez – Unplaced

=== Mister Global Venezuela ===
Year	Represented	Titleholder	Birth	Age	Hometown	Location	Date	Entrants	Placement
Did not compete between 2017–2022
2015	Nueva Esparta	Yuber Jiménez		22	Porlamar	Bangkok, Thailand	March 7, 2015	21	1st Runner-Up
Did not compete between 2016–2017
2018	Distrito Capital	Christian Nunes	June 7, 1993	25	Caracas	Bangkok, Thailand	July 22, 2018	38	Top 10
2019		Orlando Delgado (Note: Orlando Ruíz Delgado represented Venezuela at Mister Grand International 2018 but could not participate in Mister Global 2019.)				Bangkok, Thailand	September 26, 2019	38	Did not compete
2021	Miranda	Juan Carlos Da Silva	February 14, 2000	22		Maha Sarakham, Thailand	March 15, 2022	33	3rd Runner-Up
Did not compete between 2022–2023
2023	Zulia	Daniel Olaves	December 22, 2002	20	Puertos de Altagracia	Maha Sarakham, Thailand	November 26, 2023	36	Did not compete
2024	Distrito Capital	Sergio Gómez	June 6, 1994	30	Petare	Bangkok, Thailand	October 6, 2024	32	Top 20

=== Mister Supranational Venezuela ===
Year	Represented	Titleholder	Birth	Age	Hometown	Location	Date	Entrants	Placement
2016	Distrito Capital	Gustavo Acevedo	January 3, 1997	19	Caracas	Stadion MOSiR, Krynica-Zdrój, Lesser Poland Voivodeship, Poland	December 3, 2016	36	Top 10
2017	Aragua	Gabriel Correa	February 17, 1989	28	Maracay	Stadion MOSiR, Krynica-Zdrój, Lesser Poland Voivodeship, Poland	December 2, 2017	34	Mister Supranational 2017
2018	Miranda	Jeudiel Condado	May 11, 1990	28	San Antonio de Los Altos	Stadion MOSiR, Krynica-Zdrój, Lesser Poland Voivodeship, Poland	December 8, 2018	39	Unplaced
2019	Mérida	Leonardo Carrero	November 1, 1992	27	El Vigía	International Congress Centre, Katowice, Silesian Voivodeship, Poland	December 7, 2019	40	4th Runner-Up
2020	No competition held due to the COVID-19 pandemic								
2021	Zulia	William Badell	June 29, 1996	25	Maracaibo	Strzelecki Park Amphitheater, Nowy Sącz, Małopolska, Poland	August 22, 2021	34	2nd Runner-Up
2022	Distrito Capital	Anthony Gallardo	May 24, 1993	29	Caracas	Strzelecki Park Amphitheater, Nowy Sącz, Małopolska, Poland	July 16, 2022	34	Top 20
2023	Zulia	Jorge Eduardo Núñez	September 23, 1994	28	Cabimas	Strzelecki Park Amphitheater, Nowy Sącz, Małopolska, Poland	July 15, 2023	34	Unplaced (Top 25)
2024	Distrito Capital	Marcos De Freitas	July 21, 1999	24	Caracas	Strzelecki Park Amphitheater, Nowy Sącz, Lesser Poland, Poland	July 4, 2024	36	3rd Runner-Up
2025	Distrito Capital	Víctor Battista	September 29, 1995	29	Caracas	Strzelecki Park Amphitheater, Nowy Sącz, Lesser Poland, Poland	June 28, 2025	38	Top 10

=== Man of Venezuela ===
Year	Represented	Titleholder	Birth	Age	Hometown	Location	Date	Entrants	Placement
Did not compete between 2017–2022
2022	Distrito Capital	César Leonardo Urbaneja	December 5, 1989	32	Caracas	Baguio Convention Center, Baguio, Philippines	June 18, 2022	22	Did not compete
2023	Distrito Capital	Omar Riera	July 24, 1988	35	Caracas	Samsung Performing Arts Theater, Makati, Philippines	June 16, 2023	24	Top 17
2024	Distrito Capital	Sergio Azuaga	November 14, 2003	20	Caracas	Winford Resort and Casino, Manila, Philippines	July 26, 2024	23	Man of the World 2024
2025	Distrito Capital	Marcos Palacios			Caracas	SM SkyDome, Quezon City, Philippines	July 26, 2024	27	Unplaced
2026	Zulia	Manuel Alejandro Polanco	September 23		Maracaibo				

== Venezuelan titleholders at national pageants ==
=== Mister Turismo Venezuela ===
Year	Represented	Titleholder	Birth	Age	Hometown	Location	Date	Entrants	Placement
2002	Sucre	Gustavo Granados	September 22, 1982	20	Maracay	Valencia	June 30, 2002	23	2nd Runner-up in Mr. Tourism International 2002
2003	Mérida	Víctor Sánchez	July 20, 1981	21	Mérida	Teatro Alfredo Célis Pérez, Naguanagua	June 8, 2003	33	
2004	Miranda	Jenisson Bonilla	April 30, 1980	24	Caracas	Asociación de Ejecutivos de Carabobo, Valencia	October 3, 2004	28	Unplaced in Grasim Mr. International 2003
2005	Lara	Miguel Ángel Brito		23	Barquisimeto	Centro Social Madeirense, San Diego	October 11, 2005	30	Top 15 in Manhunt International 2006
→ Moved its headquarters from Valencia, Carabobo to Caracas
2006	Distrito Capital	Germán González	February 18, 1981	25	San Antonio de Los Altos	Trasnocho Cultural, Caracas	December 7, 2006	23	Unplaced in Manhunt International 2007
2007	Anzoátegui	Henry Licett	December 12, 1987	19	El Tigre				Mster Tourism Expoworld 2007; Mster Turismo de las Américas 2008
2008	Distrito Capital	Orlando Delgado	September 13, 1989	18	Caracas	The Hotel, El Rosal, Caracas	May 22, 2008	18	Top 15 in Manhunt International 2008
2009	Lara	Luis Javier Cuencas		21	Barquisimeto	Teatro Escena 8, Caracas	July 7, 2009	20	
2010	Aragua	Henry Bolívar		21		Universidad Santa María, Caracas	October 15, 2010	15	Top 16 in Manhunt International 2010
2011	Bolívar	José Antonio Ampueda	November 12, 1987	23	Puerto Ordaz	Universidad Santa María, Caracas	July 19, 2011	12	Unplaced in Manhunt International 2011
2013	Táchira	Hernán González		24	Maracaibo	Hotel Alba Caracas, Caracas	July 30, 2013	19	
2014	Táchira	Francisco Gil	June 13, 1989	25	Valera	CCCT, Caracas	September 2, 2014	17	Top 16 in Manhunt International 2016
2015	Lara	Carlos Arturo Pichardo		25	Barquisimeto	Hotel Pestana, Caracas	August 11, 2015	23	
2016	Vargas	Anderson Tovar		25		Hotel Maruma, Maracaibo	August 2, 2016	17	
2017	Aragua	Francesco Piscitelli	April 23, 1997	20	Maracay	Hotel Eurobuilding, Caracas	August 14, 2017	14	1st Runner-up in Mister International 2018
2018	Miranda	Juan Carlos Da Silva	February 14, 2000	18		Hotel Eurobuilding, Caracas	June 22, 2018	11	3rd Runner-up in Mister Global 2021
2019	Aragua	Herald Conner	June 21, 1993	26	Maracay	Macaracuay Plaza, Caracas	August 28, 2019	18	Top 8 in Mister Tourism World 2020
2020	No competition held due to the COVID-19 pandemic								
2021	La Guaira	Drexler Ustariz				National Theatre of Venezuela, Caracas	June 21, 2021	15	Top 10 in Mister Tourism World 2021
2022	Distrito Capital	Brayan Yllas	September 19, 2000	21	Caracas	National Theatre of Venezuela, Caracas	July 26, 2022	20	
2023	Miranda	Joseph Daniel Pérez	January 21, 1996	27	Los Teques	Teatro Luisela Díaz, Caracas	August 23, 2023	12	Withdrawal in Caballero Universal 2022
2024	Portuguesa	José Ángel Flores	October 18, 1993	30	Guanare	National Theatre of Venezuela, Caracas	July 7, 2024	12	TBA in Mister Tourism World 2024

=== Mister Handsome Venezuela ===
Year	Represented	Titleholder	Birth	Age	Hometown	Location	Date	Entrants	Placement
2004	Lara	Juan Hilario Pérez^{[α]}	June 5, 1983	24	Carora	N/A	2004	N/A	Mister Handsome International 2004
2005	Distrito Capital	Domenico Dell' Olio	December 6, 1979	25	Caracas	Hotel Eurobuilding, Caracas	August 31, 2005	48	4th Runner-Up in Mister Handsome International 2005
2006	Miranda	Javier Delgado	February 6, 1984	22	Caracas	Quinta Esmeralda, Caracas	August 2, 2006	31	1st Runner-Up in Mister International 2006
2007	Distrito Capital	Will Viloria	January 29, 1989	18	Caracas	Teatro Municipal, Caracas	September 21, 2007	28	Mister Handsome International 2007
2008	Monagas	Héctor Manzano	December 21, 1987	20	Maturín	Casa del Artista, Caracas	August 12, 2008	30	2nd Runner-up in Mister Handsome International 2009
2009	Guárico	Édgar Moreno	November 12, 1985	23	Rubio	Caracas Military Circle, Caracas	August 25, 2009	31	3rd Runner-up in Mister Universe 2010
2010	Nueva Esparta	Juan Pablo Gómez	February 23, 1987	23	Boca del Río	Caracas Military Circle, Caracas	September 1, 2010	30	Mister Universe 2011
2011	Monagas	Julio César Torres	May 17, 1988	23	Maturín	Hermandad Gallega, Caracas	October 5, 2011	28	4th Runner-up in Mister Universe 2012
2012	Guárico	Christian Rodríguez		21	Naiguatá	Hermandad Gallega, Caracas	August 16, 2012	31	Top 12 in Mister Universe 2013
2013	Distrito Capital	José Luis Fernández		23	Caracas	Hermandad Gallega, Caracas	October 2, 2013	30	1st Runner-up in Mister Universe 2014
2016	Municipio Libertador (Resigned)	Eugenio Díaz	November 7, 1994	22	Caracas		December 3, 2016	26	
2017	Trujillo	Leonardo Carrero	November 1, 1992	25	El Vigía	Teatro Luisela Díaz, Caracas	December 22, 2017	24	4th Runner-up in Mister Supranational 2019
2018	Distrito Capital	Alejandro Viloria				Teatro Luisela Díaz, Caracas	November 30, 2018	17	
2019	Carabobo	Jesús González		18		Hotel Alba Caracas, Caracas	December 16, 2019	10	
2020	No competition held due to the COVID-19 pandemic								
2021	Lara (Dethroned)	Rafael Sánchez		21	Portuguesa	Casa del Artista, Caracas	October 30, 2021	19	
2021	Táchira (Assumed)	Miguel Rodríguez					March 23, 2022		2nd Runner-Up (Mister Apolo International) in Mister Handsome International 2022
2022	Apure (Resigned)	Carlos Rosales		21		Teatro Luisela Díaz, Caracas	November 11, 2022	16	
2022	Lara (Assumed)	Fabián Morales					March 28, 2023		

Notes

- ^α Designated.

=== Mister Deporte Venezuela ===
Year	Represented	Titleholder	Birth	Age	Hometown	Location	Date	Entrants	Placement
2010	Distrito Capital	Anderson Escalona^{[α]}	December 13, 1984	25	Caracas	N/A	July 2010	N/A	Unplaced in Best Model of the World 2010
2011	Nueva Esparta	Jeyco Estaba	September 30, 1985	26	Caracas	Universidad Nueva Esparta, Caracas	November 16, 2011	14	Top 15 in Manhunt International 2012
2012	Zulia	Luis Castillo	January 15, 1991	21	Caracas	Universidad Nueva Esparta, Caracas	September 13, 2012	12	Withdrawal in Mister Model International 2014
2013	Zulia	Walfred Crespo	March 12, 1994	19	Cabimas	Universidad Nueva Esparta, Caracas	November 15, 2013	10	Top 16 in Mister International 2016
2014	Vargas	Ángel David Rodríguez		22		Hotel Alba Caracas, Caracas	November 7, 2014		Top 13 in Mister Model International 2015
2015	Táchira	Abraham Álvarez		19	Michelena	Macaracuay Plaza, Caracas	November 12, 2015	17	
2016	Táchira	Johinar Villamizar		19	San Cristóbal	Teatro Santa Fe, Caracas	December 15, 2016		
2017	Distrito Capital	Lionel Rodríguez^{[α]}		25	Caracas	CCCT, Caracas	November 27, 2017	N/A	Unplaced in Mister Model International 2018

Notes

- ^α Designated.

=== Mister Universo Venezuela ===
Year	Represented	Titleholder	Birth	Age	Hometown	Location	Date	Entrants	Placement
2014	Sucre	Christian Nunes	June 7, 1993	21	Caracas	Hermandad Gallega, Caracas	November 4, 2014	25	Unplaced in Mister Universe 2015; Top 10 in Mister Global 2018
2015	Delta Amacuro	Luis Domingo Báez	March 14, 1997	18	Caracas	Hermandad Gallega, Caracas	November 3, 2015	31	1st Runner-Up in Mister Universe 2016
2016	Táchira	Jesús Zambrano	January 22, 1993	23	La Grita	Hermandad Gallega, Caracas	November 9, 2016	32	Unplaced in Mister Universe 2017
2017	Miranda	Jaime Betancourt	July 4, 1997	20	Los Teques	Hermandad Gallega, Caracas	November 15, 2017	28	2nd Runner-Up in Mister Universe 2018
2018	Bolívar	Luis Enrique Rodríguez	May 28, 1992	26	Puerto Ordaz	Hermandad Gallega, Caracas	November 14, 2018	31	Top 15 in Mister Universe 2019
2019	Carabobo	Jheison Mena	November 24, 1991	27	Maracay	Hermandad Gallega, Caracas	November 13, 2019	29	
2020	Amazonas	Samir Gallardo	September 15, 1999	21		Teatro Municipal de Chacao, Caracas	August 19, 2021	28	1st Runner-Up in Mister Universe International 2022
2021	Distrito Capital	Jefferson Azzollini	14 March		Caracas	Hermandad Gallega, Caracas	June 8, 2022	28	
2022	Lara	Ricardo Navas			Barquisimeto	Hermandad Gallega, Caracas	November 30, 2022	24	
2023	Cojedes	Eduardo Franlex Ramírez				Hermandad Gallega, Caracas	November 15, 2023	29	
2024	Apure	Dorian Mendoza		21		Teatro Luisela Díaz, Caracas	December 10, 2024	25	

=== Mister Supranational Venezuela ===
Year	Represented	Titleholder	Birth	Age	Hometown	Location	Date	Entrants	Placement
2016	Distrito Capital	Gustavo Acevedo^{[α]}	January 3, 1997	19	Caracas	N/A	November 21, 2016	N/A	Top 10 in Mister Supranational 2016
2017	Aragua	Gabriel Correa^{[α]}	February 17, 1989	28	Maracay	N/A	June 25, 2017	N/A	Mister Supranational 2017
2018	Miranda	Jeudiel Condado^{[α]}	May 11, 1990	28	San Antonio de Los Altos	N/A	June 5, 2018	N/A	Unplaced in Mister Supranational 2018
2019	Mérida	Leonardo Carrero^{[α]}	November 1, 1992	26	El Vigía	Centro Cultural Chacao, Caracas	August 22, 2019	N/A	4th Runner-Up in Mister Supranational 2019
2020	No competition held due to the COVID-19 pandemic								
2021	Zulia	William Badell	June 29, 1996	24	Maracaibo	Globovisión Studios, Caracas	May 27, 2021	5	2nd Runner-Up in Mister Supranational 2021
2022	Distrito Capital	Anthony Gallardo	May 24, 1993	29	Caracas	Teatro Junín, Caracas	June 9, 2022	11	Top 20 in Mister Supranational 2022
2023	Zulia	Jorge Eduardo Núñez	September 23, 1994	27	Cabimas	Teatro Junín, Caracas	June 9, 2022	11	Unplaced (Top 25) in Mister Supranational 2023
2024	Distrito Capital (No. 8)	Marcos De Freitas	July 21, 1999	24	Caracas	Poliedro de Caracas, Caracas	November 17, 2023	14	3rd Runner-Up in Mister Supranational 2024
2025	Distrito Capital	Víctor Battista	September 29, 1995	29	Caracas	Globovisión Studios, Caracas	March 29, 2025	N/A	Top 10 in Mister Supranational 2025

Notes

- ^α Designated.

=== Caballero Venezuela ===
Year	Represented	Titleholder	Birth	Age	Hometown	Location	Date	Entrants	Placement
2019	Guárico	Luis Bermúdez		20		Caracas Military Circle, Caracas	February 5, 2020	18	Virrey (2nd-place finisher) in Caballero Universal 2021
2020	No competition held due to the COVID-19 pandemic								
2021	Falcón	Orangel Dirinot	November 10, 1995	25	Coro	Teatro Principal, Caracas	September 29, 2021	17	
2022	Miranda	Gabriel Bastidas		19		Casa del Artista, Caracas	October 18, 2022	15	2nd Prince (4th-place-finisher) in Caballero Universal 2023
2024	Portuguesa	César Ricardo Aguilar^{[α]}		22	Guanare	N/A	September 4, 2024	N/A	Virrey (2nd-place finisher) in Caballero Universal 2024

Notes

- ^α Designated.

== See also ==
- List of Mister Venezuela editions
- List of Mister Venezuela runners-up and finalists
