= List of Mister Venezuela editions =

Mister Venezuela editions

The following is a list of Mister Venezuela pageant edition and information.

- Designated

Year	Edition	Winner	Date	Venue	Host city	Entrants
1996	1st	Zulia (No. 20)	July 17	Venevisión Studios	Caracas, Distrito Capital	20
1997	2nd	Distrito Federal (No. 11)	April 8	Venevisión Studios	Caracas, Distrito Capital	20
1998	3rd	Distrito Federal (No. 15)	October 29	Venevisión Studios	Caracas, Distrito Capital	24
1999	4th	Distrito Federal (No. 20)	November 4	Venevisión Studios	Caracas, Distrito Capital	26
2000	5th	Península Goajira	November 21	Venevisión Studios	Caracas, Distrito Capital	26
2001	6th	Vargas	November 6	Venevisión Studios	Caracas, Distrito Capital	25
2003	7th	Carabobo	July 26	Venevisión Studios	Caracas, Distrito Capital	28
2004	8th	Amazonas	June 19	Venevisión Studios	Caracas, Distrito Capital	22
2005	9th	Zulia (Resigned)	June 19	Venevisión Studios	Caracas, Distrito Capital	20
2006	10th	Distrito Capital (No. 4)	September 23	Venevisión Studios	Caracas, Distrito Capital	6
2009	1st	Distrito Capital	September	N/A		
2012	2nd	Táchira	September 20	N/A		
2014	11th	Barinas (No. 12)	May 24	Venevisión Studios	Caracas, Distrito Capital	12
2015	12th	Aragua (No. 13)	May 23	Venevisión Studios	Caracas, Distrito Capital	14
2016	13th	Aragua (No. 6)	May 28	Venevisión Studios	Caracas, Distrito Capital	14
2017	14th	Distrito Capital (No. 13)	June 10	Venevisión Studios	Caracas, Distrito Capital	14
2019	15th	Zulia (No. 9)	April 13	Venevisión Studios	Caracas, Distrito Capital	14
2024	16th	Carabobo (No. 9)	July 13	Venevisión Studios	Caracas, Distrito Capital	14

== Host city by number ==
Currently all 16 editions are held in Caracas.

City	Hosts	Year(s)
Caracas	16	1996–2024

Location count

Currently all 16 editions have been held in the Venevisión Studios as locations for the Mister Venezuela pageant.

Location	Hosts	Year(s)
Estudio 1, Venevisión	16	1996–2024

== Hosts and artists ==
The following is a list of Mister Venezuela hosts and invited artists through the years.

Year	Edition	Hosts	Co-hosts	Artists	Broadcaster
1996	1st	Maite Delgado		Las Chicas del Can • Johnny Nessy, Jorge Aravena, José Ángel Ávila • Gabriela Rodríguez, Irma Palmieri • Mercedes Salaya, Beba Rojas • Kiara	Venevisión
1997	2nd	Maite Delgado		Flavio César • Manuel Andara, Héctor Ragussa, Javier Gómez, Rodolfo Renwick • Viviana Gibelli • Fey	Venevisión
1998	3rd	Maite Delgado		Christina Dieckmann • Gabriela Vergara • Daniel Sarcos • Beba Rojas • Mercurio • Lilibeth Morillo	Venevisión
1999	4th	Maite Delgado		Carolina Perpetuo	Venevisión
2000	5th	Viviana Gibelli		A.5 • Jump • Maracaibo 15	Venevisión
2001	6th	Viviana Gibelli		Gaby Espino • Mimí Lazo, Milena Santander, Nohely Arteaga • Lorca • Yaire	Venevisión
2003	7th	Viviana Gibelli		Daniel Elbittar • Propuesta Indecente • Voz Veis • Yaire	Venevisión
2004	8th	Viviana Gibelli		Las Cherries • Omar Enrique • Héctor Montaner • Andrés Mistage, Jacinto Oropeza, Claudio de la Torre	Venevisión
2005	9th	Viviana Gibelli		Francisco León • Cristóbal Jiménez • Reyna Lucero • Alicia Machado • Beba Rojas	Venevisión
2006	10th	Mariángel Ruiz			Venevisión
2009	N/A				
2012	N/A				
2014	11th	Kerly Ruiz, Jessus Zambrano		Omar Acedo	Venevisión
2015	12th	Kerly Ruiz, Maira Alexandra Rodríguez		Liz	Venevisión
2016	13th	Kerly Ruiz, Fanny Otatti	Dave Capella	Gabo Parisi • Pedro Alonso	Venevisión
2017	14th	Fanny Otatti, Osmariel Villalobos	Dave Capella, Jesús De Alva	Romina Palmisano	Venevisión
2019	15th	Fanny Otatti, Isabella Rodríguez	Jesús De Alva		Venevisión
2024	16th	Alejandra Conde, Jordan Mendoza		Katherine Coll • Seco Cheers	Venevisión

== Venezuelan editions at national pageants ==
=== Miss & Mister Turismo Venezuela ===
Year	Edition	Miss	Mister	Date	Venue	Host city	Female/Male entrants
2000	1st	Francys Barraza; Valencia	Not awarded	October		Valencia, Carabobo	×
2001	2nd	Vanessa Fanesí; Valencia	Not awarded			Valencia, Carabobo	×
2002	3rd	Mariangélica García; Carabobo	Gustavo Granados; Sucre	June 30		Valencia, Carabobo	×; 23
2003	4th	Jessica Jardín; Yaracuy	Víctor Sánchez; Mérida	June 8	Teatro Alfredo Célis Pérez	Naguanagua, Carabobo	27; 33
2004	5th	Diana Wood; Bolívar	Jenisson Bonilla; Miranda	October 3	Asociación de Ejecutivos de Carabobo	Valencia, Carabobo	40; 28
2005	6th	Yenisberth Brito; Lara	Miguel Ángel Brito; Lara	October 11	Centro Social Madeirense	San Diego, Carabobo	30; 30
2006	7th	Carmen Isarra; Barinas	N/A	October 12	Centro Social Madeirense	San Diego, Carabobo	23
2006	7th	N/A	Germán González; Distrito Capital	December 7	Trasnocho Cultural	Caracas, Distrito Capital	23
2007	8th	Lourdes Caldera; Costa Oriental	N/A	November	Caracas Military Circle	Caracas, Distrito Capital	×
2007	8th	N/A	Henry Licett; Anzoátegui			Caracas, Distrito Capital	×
2008	9th	N/A	Orlando Delgado; Distrito Capital	May 22	The Hotel, El Rosal	Caracas, Distrito Capital	18
2008	9th	Estefanía Di Filippo; Distrito Capital	N/A	November 4	Caracas Military Circle	Caracas, Distrito Capital	25
2009	10th	N/A	Luis Javier Cuencas; Lara	July 7	Teatro Escena 8	Caracas, Distrito Capital	20
2009	10th	Jéssica Ibarra; Zulia	N/A	November 25	Caracas Military Circle	Caracas, Distrito Capital	26
2010	11th	Stephany González; Lara	Henry Bolívar; Aragua	October 15	Universidad Santa María	Caracas, Distrito Capital	30; 15
2011	12th	Karelys Oliveros; Carabobo	José Antonio Ampueda; Bolívar	July 19	Universidad Santa María	Caracas, Distrito Capital	28; 12
2013	13th	Beronika Martínez; Península Goajira	Hernán González; Táchira	July 30	Hotel Alba Caracas	Caracas, Distrito Capital	25; 19
2014	14th	Aurimar Pastrano; Federal Dependencies	Francisco Gil; Táchira	September 2	CCCT/Hotel Tamanaco	Caracas, Distrito Capital	35; 17
2015	15th	Karen Aliberti; Bolívar	Carlos Arturo Pichardo; Lara	August 11	Hotel Pestana	Caracas, Distrito Capital	43; 23
2016	16th	Giorgiana Rosas; Anzoátegui	Anderson Tovar; Vargas	August 2	Hotel Maruma	Maracaibo, Zulia	30; 17
2017	17th	Diana Silva; Vargas	Francesco Piscitelli; Aragua	August 14	Hotel Eurobuilding	Caracas, Distrito Capital	33; 14
2018	18th	Alexandra Sanabria; Miranda	Juan Carlos Da Silva; Miranda	June 22	Hotel Eurobuilding	Caracas, Distrito Capital	19; 11
2019	19th	Yeniret Torres; Delta Amacuro	Herald Conner; Aragua	August 28	Macaracuay Plaza	Caracas, Distrito Capital	18; 18
2020	No competition held due to the COVID-19 pandemic						
2021	20th	Laura Zabaleta; Amazonas	Drexler Ustariz; La Guaira	June 21	National Theatre of Venezuela	Caracas, Distrito Capital	23; 15
2022	21st	Fernanda González; Distrito Capital	Brayan Yllas; Distrito Capital	July 26	National Theatre of Venezuela	Caracas, Distrito Capital	21; 20
2023	22nd	Stephany Abasali; Bolívar	Joseph Daniel Pérez; Miranda	August 23	Teatro Luisela Díaz	Caracas, Distrito Capital	18; 12
2024	23rd	Milena Soto; Mérida	José Ángel Flores; Portuguesa	July 7	National Theatre of Venezuela	Caracas, Distrito Capital	23; 12

=== Mister Handsome Venezuela ===
Year	Edition	Winner	Date	Venue	Host city	Entrants
2004	1st	Juan Hilario Pérez^{[α]} Lara		N/A		
2005	1st	Domenico Dell' Olio; Distrito Capital	August 31	Hotel Eurobuilding	Caracas, Distrito Capital	48
2006	2nd	Javier Delgado; Miranda	August 2	Quinta Esmeralda	Caracas, Distrito Capital	31
2007	3rd	Will Viloria; Distrito Capital	September 21	Teatro Municipal	Caracas, Distrito Capital	28
2008	4th	Héctor Manzano; Monagas	August 12	Casa del Artista	Caracas, Distrito Capital	30
2009	5th	Édgar Moreno; Guárico	August 25	Caracas Military Circle	Caracas, Distrito Capital	31
2010	6th	Juan Pablo Gómez; Nueva Esparta	September 1	Caracas Military Circle	Caracas, Distrito Capital	30
2011	7th	Julio César Torres; Monagas	October 5	Hermandad Gallega	Caracas, Distrito Capital	28
2012	8th	Christian Rodríguez; Guárico	August 16	Hermandad Gallega	Caracas, Distrito Capital	31
2013	9th	José Luis Fernández; Distrito Capital	October 2	Hermandad Gallega	Caracas, Distrito Capital	30
2016	10th	Eugenio Díaz; Municipio Libertador (Resigned)	December 3		Caracas, Distrito Capital	26
2017	11th	Leonardo Carrero; Trujillo	December 22	Teatro Luisela Díaz	Caracas, Distrito Capital	24
2018	12th	Alejandro Viloria; Distrito Capital	November 30	Teatro Luisela Díaz	Caracas, Distrito Capital	17
2019	13th	Jesús González; Carabobo	December 16	Hotel Alba Caracas	Caracas, Distrito Capital	10
2020	No competition held due to the COVID-19 pandemic					
2021	14th	Rafael Sánchez; Lara (Dethroned) Miguel Rodríguez; Táchira (Assumed)	October 30	Casa del Artista	Caracas, Distrito Capital	19
2022	15th	Carlos Rosales; Apure (Resigned) Fabián Morales; Lara (Assumed)	November 11	Teatro Luisela Díaz	Caracas, Distrito Capital	16

Notes

- ^α Designated.

=== Señorita & Mister Deporte Venezuela ===
Year	Edition	Miss	Mister	Date	Venue	Host city	Female/Male entrants
2006	1st	Natascha Brandt	Not awarded	August 8		Caracas, Distrito Capital	×
2007	2nd	Charyl Chacón; Nueva Esparta	Not awarded	August 15		Caracas, Distrito Capital	29
2008	3rd	Karen Perera; Miranda	Not awarded	July 31	Universidad Nueva Esparta	Caracas, Distrito Capital	24
2009	4th	Iluska Caraballo; Amazonas	Not awarded	November 9	Universidad Santa María	Caracas, Distrito Capital	19
2010	5th	Orianna Pérez; Zulia	Not awarded	October 13	Caracas Military Circle	Caracas, Distrito Capital	19
2010	1st	N/A	Anderson Escalona^{[α]} Distrito Capital	July	N/A		
2011	6th	Eyleen Mendoza; Miranda	Jeyco Estaba; Nueva Esparta	November 16	Universidad Nueva Esparta	Caracas, Distrito Capital	16; 14
2012	7th	Mariana Jiménez; Vargas	Luis Castillo; Zulia	September 13	Universidad Nueva Esparta	Caracas, Distrito Capital	14; 12
2013	8th	Yosmary Martínez; Amazonas	Walfred Crespo; Zulia	November 15	Universidad Nueva Esparta	Caracas, Distrito Capital	13; 10
2014	9th	Reina Rojas; Táchira	Ángel David Rodríguez; Vargas	November 7	Hotel Alba Caracas	Caracas, Distrito Capital	
2015	10th	Hyser Betancourt; Vargas	Abraham Álvarez; Táchira	November 12	Macaracuay Plaza	Caracas, Distrito Capital	21; 16
2016	11th	Maritza Contreras; Táchira	Johinar Villamizar; Táchira	December 15	Teatro Santa Fe	Caracas, Distrito Capital	20
2017	2nd	N/A	Lionel Rodríguez^{[α]} Distrito Capital	November 27	CCCT	Caracas, Distrito Capital	N/A

Notes

- ^α Designated.

=== Mister Universo Venezuela ===
Year	Edition	Winner	Date	Venue	Host city	Entrants
2014	1st	Christian Nunes; Sucre	November 4	Hermandad Gallega	Caracas, Distrito Capital	25
2015	2nd	Luis Domingo Báez; Delta Amacuro	November 3	Hermandad Gallega	Caracas, Distrito Capital	31
2016	3rd	Jesús Zambrano; Táchira	November 9	Hermandad Gallega	Caracas, Distrito Capital	32
2017	4th	Jaime Betancourt; Miranda	November 15	Hermandad Gallega	Caracas, Distrito Capital	28
2018	5th	Luis Enrique Rodríguez; Bolívar	November 14	Hermandad Gallega	Caracas, Distrito Capital	31
2019	6th	Jheison Mena; Carabobo	November 13	Hermandad Gallega	Caracas, Distrito Capital	29
2020	7th	Samir Gallardo; Amazonas	August 19, 2021	Teatro Municipal de Chacao	Caracas, Distrito Capital	28
2021	8th	Jefferson Azzollini; Distrito Capital	June 8, 2022	Hermandad Gallega	Caracas, Distrito Capital	28
2022	9th	Ricardo Navas; Lara	November 30	Hermandad Gallega	Caracas, Distrito Capital	24
2023	10th	Eduardo Ramírez; Cojedes	November 15	Hermandad Gallega	Caracas, Distrito Capital	29
2024	11th	Dorian Mendoza; Apure	December 10	Teatro Luisela Díaz	Caracas, Distrito Capital	25

=== Supranational Venezuela ===
Year	Edition	Miss	Mister	Date	Venue	Host city	Female/Male entrants
2009	1st	Silvia Meneses^{[α]} Distrito Capital	Not awarded	N/A			
2010	2nd	Laksmi Rodríguez^{[α]} Táchira	Not awarded	N/A			
2011	3rd	Andrea Destongue^{[α]} Lara	Not awarded	N/A			
2012	4th	Diamilex Alexander^{[α]} Zulia	Not awarded	N/A			
2013	5th	Annie Fuenmayor^{[α]} Zulia	Not awarded	N/A			
2014	6th	Patricia Carreño^{[α]} Costa Oriental	Not awarded	N/A			
2015	7th	Hyser Betancourt^{[α]} Vargas	Not awarded	N/A			
2016	8th	Valeria Vespoli^{[α]} Monagas	Gustavo Acevedo^{[α]} Distrito Capital	N/A			
2017	9th	Geraldine Duque^{[α]} Táchira	Gabriel Correa^{[α]} Aragua	N/A			
2018	10th	Nariman Battikha^{[α]} Monagas	Jeudiel Condado^{[α]} Miranda	N/A			
2019	1st	Gabriela de la Cruz; Carabobo	Leonardo Carrero^{[α]} Mérida	August 22	Centro Cultural Chacao	Caracas, Distrito Capital	30; 1
2020	No competition held due to the COVID-19 pandemic						
2021	2nd	Valentina Sánchez; Nueva Esparta	William Badell; Zulia	May 27	Globovisión Studios	Caracas, Distrito Capital	10; 10
2022	3rd	Ismelys Velásquez; La Guaira	Anthony Gallardo; Distrito Capital	June 9, 2022	Teatro Junín	Caracas, Distrito Capital	13; 11
2023	3rd	Selene Delgado; Miranda	Jorge Eduardo Núñez; Zulia	June 9, 2022	Teatro Junín	Caracas, Distrito Capital	13; 11
2024	4th	Rossana Fiorini; Mérida	Marcos De Freitas; Distrito Capital	November 17, 2023	Poliedro de Caracas	Caracas, Distrito Capital	22; 14

Notes

- ^α Designated.

=== Caballero Venezuela ===
Year	Edition	Winner	Date	Venue	Host city	Entrants
2019	1st	José Ángel Flores; Guárico	February 5, 2020	Caracas Military Circle	Caracas, Distrito Capital	18
2020	No competition held due to the COVID-19 pandemic					
2021	2nd	José Ángel Flores; Falcón	September 29	Teatro Principal	Caracas, Distrito Capital	17
2022	3rd	José Ángel Flores; Miranda	October 18	Casa del Artista	Caracas, Distrito Capital	15
2024	4th	César Ricardo Aguilar^{[α]} Portuguesa	September 4	N/A	Caracas, Distrito Capital	N/A

Notes

- ^α Designated.

=== Reinas y Reyes de Venezuela ===
Year	Edition	Reinas	Reyes	Date	Venue	Host city	Female/Male entrants
2023	1st	List: Miss Earth Venezuela: Karleys Rojas La Guaira; Miss Supranational Venezuela: Rossana Fiorini Mérida; Universal Woman Venezuela: Lisandra Chirinos Carabobo; Miss Panamerican Venezuela: Deborath Tovar Sucre; Reina Internacional del Café Venezuela: Meagans Rojas Falcón	List: Mister Supranational Venezuela: Marco De Freitas Distrito Capital; Mister International Venezuela: Enmanuel Serrano Distrito Capital; Mister Global Venezuela: Sergio Gómez Miranda; Manhunt Venezuela: Víctor Battista Distrito Capital	November 17	Poliedro de Caracas	Caracas, Distrito Capital	22; 14

== See also ==
- List of Mister Venezuela titleholders
