= List of Mister Venezuela runners-up and finalists =

Mister Venezuela runners-up and finalists

This article provides the names of the runners-up in the Mister Venezuela pageant since the pageant's first edition in 1996.

== Runners up and finalists ==
The contest has announced five finalists from 1996 to 1998, from 2014 to 2016 and from 2019 to 2024. From 1999 to 2005 the number was reduced to three, and in 2017 the group was increased to six (regardless if the pageant post-announces the placements of the other 2/3 delegates who made it to the Top 5/6). Furthermore, the pageant has awarded the winner with the first runner-up from 1996 to 1997, being increased to three with the second runner-up being also awarded from 1998 to 2005 and from 2014 to 2024. In 2006 only the winner was announced. In 2009 and 2012 the winners were appointed without any competition being held.

This table shows the top-five finalists of each competition, from its inception with Mister Venezuela 1996.

- Ended as top 5/6 qualification. Not announced as a runner-up at finals
- Designated

Since raking for contest is usually as follows:

- 1st place being designated as Mister Venezuela
- 2nd place being designated as Manhunt Venezuela
- 3rd place being designated as Mr. International Venezuela
- 4th place being designated as Mr. Intercontinental Venezuela

Edition	Mister Venezuela (1st Place)	1st runner-up (2nd Place)	2nd runner-up (3rd Place)	3rd runner-up (3rd Place)	4th runner-up (5th Place)
1996	José Gregorio Faría; Zulia (No. 20)	Jhonny Essig; Distrito Federal (No. 4)	Eduardo Quintana; Distrito Federal (No. 2)	Christian Zia; Aragua (No. 11)	Alberto Bahamonde; Distrito Federal (No. 1)
1997	Sandro Finoglio; Distrito Federal (No. 11)	Guillermo Pérez; Distrito Federal (No. 16)	Alexander Castellanos; Trujillo (No. 13)	Javier Faoro; Distrito Federal (No. 20)	Ismael Matamoros; Distrito Federal (No. 2)
1998	Ernesto Calzadilla; Distrito Federal (No. 15)	Numa Delgado; Distrito Federal (No. 14)	Nadir Nery; Zulia (No. 4)	Daniel Andrade; Distrito Federal (No. 12)	Diego Ochoa; Distrito Federal (No. 18)
1999	Alejandro Otero; Distrito Federal (No. 20)	Ezzio Cavallaro; Miranda (No. 26)	José Gabriel Madonia; Distrito Federal (No. 11)	Not awarded	Not awarded
2000	Luis Nery; Península Goajira	Cristóbal Lander; Miranda	Aníbal Martignani; Guárico	Not awarded	Not awarded
2001	Daniel Navarrete; Vargas	Enrique Cuevas; Carabobo	César Suárez; Delta Amacuro	Not awarded	Not awarded
2003	Andrés Mistage; Carabobo	Jacinto Oropeza; Delta Amacuro	Claudio de la Torre; Anzoátegui	Not awarded	Not awarded
2004	Francisco León; Amazonas	Miguel Blanco; Anzoátegui	Jean Claudio Palmegiani; Carabobo	Not awarded	Not awarded
2005	José Ignacio Rodríguez (resigned); Zulia	José Luis Porras; Portuguesa	José Luis Díaz; Guárico	Not awarded	Not awarded
2006	Vito Gasparrini; Distrito Capital (No. 4)	Not awarded	Not awarded	Not awarded	Not awarded
2009	José Manuel Flores; Distrito Capital	Not awarded	Not awarded	Not awarded	Not awarded
2012	Jessus Zambrano; Táchira	Not awarded	Not awarded	Not awarded	Not awarded
2014	Jesús Casanova; Barinas (No. 12)	Francisco Guerrero; Táchira (No. 7)	Jesús Alvarado; Zulia (No. 9)	Distrito Capital (No. 5) – Jonathan Negrón; Distrito Capital (No. 11) – Salvador Lugo	
2015	Gabriel Correa; Aragua (No. 13)	Rafael Angelucci; Lara (No. 10)	Georges Biloune; Lara (No. 6)	Bolívar (No. 2) – Gibson Domínguez; Lara (No. 4) – Rafael Oropeza	
2016	Renato Barabino; Aragua (No. 6)	Walfred Crespo; Zulia (No. 4)	Gustavo Acevedo; Distrito Capital (No. 2)	Distrito Capital (No. 1) – Luis Segovia; Distrito Capital (No. 13) – Ignacio Milles	
2017	Christian Nunes; Distrito Capital (No. 13)	Luis Marrero; Aragua (No. 12)	Adrián Menghini; Zulia (No. 14)	Bolívar (No. 7) – José Ricardo Rodulfo; Distrito Capital (No. 2) – David Castro; Distrito Capital (No. 9) – Alejandro Zumbo	
2019	Jorge Eduardo Núñez; Zulia (No. 9)	Leonardo Carrero; Mérida (No. 13)	Armando Veitia; Aragua (No. 3)	Distrito Capital (No. 8) – Carlos Guédez; Distrito Capital (No. 11) – Emmanuel Serrano	
2024	Juan Alberto García; Carabobo (No. 9)	Franco Daniel Cova; Miranda (No. 3)	Leiker Márquez; Táchira (No. 14)	Aragua (No. 11) – Nelson Rodríguez; Distrito Capital (No. 5) – Mike Durán	

== States/regions by number of runners-up ==
Color key

- Declared as winner
- Ended as runner-up
- Ended as top 5/8 qualification
- Ended as one of the finalists or semifinalists
- Ended as special awards winner

=== 1st runner-up ===
The first runner-up of each edition of Mister Venezuela is the second placer behind the contestant who is selected as Mister Venezuela (first placer). In some cases, he shall take over the title of Mister Venezuela, if:

- The outgoing titleholder cannot fulfill his duties. This could happen and may result to resignation, giving up the title, or dethronement
- The titleholder is dethroned due to deeds that violate the organization's policies.

The second-place finisher being designated as 1st runner-up has been awarded fifteen times (1996–2005; 2014–2024).

This table lists the number of 1st runner-up titles by state/region.

The current 1st runner-up is Franco Daniel Cova from Miranda, as for the edition that took place on July 13, 2024, in Venevisión Studios, Caracas.

Country/Territory	Titles	Year(s)
Miranda	3	1999, 2000, 2024
Distrito Capital	3	1996, 1997, 1998
Mérida	1	2019
Aragua	1	2017
Zulia	1	2016
Lara	1	2015
Táchira	1	2014
Portuguesa	1	2005
Anzoátegui	1	2004
Delta Amacuro	1	2003
Carabobo	1	2001

International representation

The 1st runner-up of Mister Venezuela has represented his country at Mister International, Mister Supranational and Mister Intercontinental.

Year	State	1st runner-up	Placement	Special Awards/Notes
2024	Miranda (No. 3)	Franco Daniel Cova		
2019	Mérida (No. 13)	Leonardo Carrero	4th runner-up in Mister Supranational 2019	
2017	Aragua (No. 12)	Luis Marrero		
2016	Zulia (No. 4)	Walfred Crespo	Top 16 in Mister International 2016	
2015	Lara (No. 10)	Rafael Angelucci	Top 10 in Mister International 2015	
2014	Táchira (No. 7)	Francisco Guerrero		
2005	Portuguesa	José Luis Porras		
2004	Anzoátegui	Miguel Blanco		
2003	Delta Amacuro	Jacinto Oropeza		
2001	Carabobo	Enrique Cuevas	Mister Intercontinental 2002	
2000	Miranda	Cristóbal Lander		
1999	Miranda (No. 26)	Ezzio Cavallaro	Top 6 (3rd runner-up) in Grasim Mr. International 2000	
1998	Distrito Capital (No. 14)	Numa Delgado		
1997	Distrito Capital (No. 16)	Guillermo Pérez		
1996	Distrito Capital (No. 4)	Jhonny Essig		

=== 2nd runner-up ===
The second Runner-Up of each edition of Mister Venezuela is the third placer behind the contestant who is selected as Mister Venezuela (first placer) and the first runner-up (second placer).

The third-place finisher being designated as 2nd runner-up has been awarded fifteen times (1996–2005; 2014–2024).

This table lists the number of 2nd runner-up titles by state/region.

The current 2nd runner-up is Leiker Márquez from Táchira, as for the edition that took place on July 13, 2024, in Venevisión Studios, Caracas.

Country/Territory	Titles	Year(s)
Zulia	3	1998, 2014, 2017
Distrito Capital	3	1996, 1999, 2016
Guárico	2	2000, 2005
Táchira	1	2024
Aragua	1	2019
Lara	1	2015
Carabobo	1	2004
Anzoátegui	1	2003
Delta Amacuro	1	2001
Trujillo	1	1997

International representation

The 2nd runner-up of Mister Venezuela has represented his country at Manhunt International, Mister International and Mister Supranational.

Year	State	2nd runner-up	Placement	Special Awards/Notes
2024	Táchira (No. 14)	Leiker Márquez		
2019	Aragua (No. 3)	Armando Veitia		
2017	Zulia (No. 14)	Adrián Menghini		
2016	Distrito Capital (No. 2)	Gustavo Acevedo	Top 10 in Mister Supranational 2016	
2015	Lara (No. 6)	Georges Biloune		
2014	Zulia (No. 9)	Jesús Alvarado	3rd runner-up in Mister Grand International 2018	
2005	Guárico	José Luis Díaz		
2004	Carabobo	Jean Claudio Palmegiani		
2003	Anzoátegui	Claudio de la Torre	Top 15 in Manhunt Internacional 2005	
2001	Delta Amacuro	César Suárez	2nd runner-up in Mister Intercontinental 2001	
2000	Guárico	Aníbal Martignani	1st runner-up in Grasim Mr. International 2001	
1999	Distrito Capital (No. 11)	José Gabriel Madonia	Mister American Continent 2000	
1999	Distrito Capital (No. 11)	José Gabriel Madonia	3rd runner-up in Manhunt International 2000	
1998	Zulia (No. 4)	Nadir Nery	Grasim Mr. International 1999	
1997	Trujillo (No. 13)	Alexander Castellanos	Mister Tourism International in Mr. Handsome International 2000	
1997	Trujillo (No. 13)	Alexander Castellanos	Top 6 (3rd runner-up) in Grasim Mr. International 1998	
1996	Distrito Capital (No. 2)	Eduardo Quintana		

=== 3rd runner-up ===
The third runner-up of each edition of Mister Venezuela is the fourth placer behind the conestant who is selected as Mister Venezuela first placer), the first runner-up (second placer) and the second runner-up (third placer).

The fourth-place finisher being designated as 3rd runner-up has been awarded three times (1996–1998) (unless not at finals).

Country/Territory	Titles	Year(s)
Distrito Capital	2	1997, 1998
Aragua	1	1996

International representation

Year	State	3rd runner-up	Placement	Special Awards/Notes
1998	Distrito Capital (No. 12)	Daniel Andrade		
1997	Distrito Capital (No. 20)	Javier Faoro		
1996	Aragua (No. 11)	Christian Zia		

=== 4th runner-up ===
The fourth Runner-Up of each edition of Mister Venezuela is the fifth placer behind the conestant who is selected as Mister Venezuela (first placer), the first runner-up (second placer), the second Runner-Up (third placer) and the third runner-up (fourth placer).

The fifth-place finisher being designated as 4th runner-up has been awarded three times (1996–1998) (unless not at finals).

Country/Territory	Titles	Year(s)
Distrito Capital	3	1996, 1997, 1998

International representation

The 4th runner-up of Mister Venezuela has represented his country at International Male Model stage in Aruba.

Year	State	4th runner-up	Placement	Special Awards/Notes
1998	Distrito Capital (No. 18)	Diego Ochoa	2nd runner-up in International Male Model 2000	
1997	Distrito Capital (No. 2)	Ismael Matamoros		
1996	Distrito Capital (No. 1)	Alberto Bahamonde		

=== Finalists ===
This list shows finalists that had participated at international competitions.

Year	State	Top 5/6	Placement	Special Awards/Notes
2019	Distrito Capital (No. 11)	Emmanuel Serrano	TBA in Mister International 2024	
2019	Distrito Capital (No. 8)	Carlos Guédez	Unplaced in Mister Universe 2019	As a Margarita Island representative
2016	Distrito Capital (No. 13)	Ignacio Milles	Top 10 in Mister International 2017	
2014	Distrito Capital	Jonathan Negrón	Mister Young International 2008	
2014	Distrito Capital	Jonathan Negrón	Mister Gentleman 2008	

=== Semifinilists ===
This list shows semifinilists that had participated at international competitions.

Year	State	Top 10	Placement	Special Awards/Notes
2000	Carabobo	Deive Garcés	International Male Model 2001	

=== Contestans ===
This list shows remainder contestants that had participated at international competitions.

Year	State	Contestant	Placement	Special Awards/Notes
2017	Distrito Capital (No. 4)	Omar Riera	Top 17 in Man of the World 2023	
2016	Distrito Capital (No. 14)	José Luis Trujillo	Top 16 in Manhunt International 2022	
2015	Miranda (No. 3)	Jeudiel Condado	Unplaced in Mister Supranational 2018	
2004	Zulia	Juan Hilario Pérez	Mr. Handsome International 2004	
2003	Vargas	Alberto Bachour	Mr. Handsome International 2002 (Resigned)	As a Margarita Island representative
2001	Amazonas	Franconero Silva	1st runner-up in Modelo Revelación Internacional 2002	
2001	Cojedes	Julio Cabrera	1st runner-up in Grasim Mr. International 2002	
2000	Cojedes	Johnny Álvarez Díaz	Semifinalist in Mr. American Continent 2000	
2000	Portuguesa	Tony Ferreira	Semifinalist in Mr. American Continent 2000	
1999	Carabobo (No. 14)	Hugo Zafra	Unplaced in Mr. Tourism International 2001	Mr. Fitness
1999	Zulia (No. 21)	Juan Carlos Tarazona	Unplaced in International Male Model 2000	
1998	(No. 9)	Emilio Navas	Mr. Handsome International 1999	As a Coche Island representative
1996	(No. 17)	Roberto Rondón	International Male Model 1999	

== Runners-up and finalists table position ==
State or region	X	Mister Venezuela (1st Place)	1st runner-up (2nd Place)	2nd runner-up (3rd Place)	Finalists (Top 5/6)	Semifinalists (Top 10)
Distrito Capital	23	6 (1997, 1998, 1999, 2006, 2009, 2017)	3 (1996, 1997, 1998)	3 (1996, 1999, 2016)	8 (1996, 1997, 1998, 2014, 2016, 2017, 2019, 2024)	3 (1999, 2000, 2004)
Zulia	10	2 (1996, ~~2005~~, 2019)	1 (2016)	3 (1998, 2014, 2017)	×	3 (2000, 2001, 2003)
Aragua	8	2 (2015, 2016)	1 (2017)	1 (2019)	2 (1996, 2024)	2 (2000, 2004)
Carabobo	5	2 (2003, 2024)	1 (2001)	1 (2004)	×	1 (2000)
Táchira	5	1 (2012)	1 (2014)	1 (2024)	×	2 (2000, 2005)
Península Goajira	3	1 (2000)	×	×	×	2 (2001, 2004)
Amazonas	2	1 (2004)	×	×	×	1 (2005)
Barinas	1	1 (2014)	×	×	×	×
Vargas	1	1 (2001)	×	×	×	×
Miranda	5	×	3 (1999, 2000, 2024)	×	×	2 (2003, 2005)
Lara	4	×	1 (2015)	1 (2015)	1 (2015)	1 (2000)
Delta Amacuro	3	×	1 (2003)	1 (2001)	×	1 (2004)
Anzoátegui	2	×	1 (2004)	1 (2003)	×	×
Mérida	4	×	1 (2019)	×	×	3 (2003, 2004, 2005)
Portuguesa	2	×	1 (2005)	×	×	1 (2001)
Guárico	3	×	×	2 (2000, 2005)	×	1 (2001)
Trujillo	1	×	×	1 (1997)	×	×
Bolívar	4	×	×	×	2 (2015, 2017)	2 (2003, 2005)
Nueva Esparta	3	×	×	×	×	3 (2001, 2003, 2005)
Sucre	2	×	×	×	×	2 (2000, 2004)
Falcón	1	×	×	×	×	1 (2005)
Costa Oriental	1	×	×	×	×	1 (2004)
Cojedes	1	×	×	×	×	1 (2003)
Dependencias Federales	1	×	×	×	×	1 (2003)
Apure	1	×	×	×	×	1 (2001)
Yaracuy	1	×	×	×	×	1 (2001)
Monagas	0	×	×	×	×	×
Total	**97**	**18**	**15**	**15**	**13**	**36**

The state/region who assumed a position is indicated in bold
The state/region who was dethroned, resigned or originally held the position is indicated in striketrough
The state/region who was dethroned, resigned or originally held the position but was not replaced is indicated underlined

== Special awards ==
This list provides the names of the special award winners in the Mister Venezuela pageant.

=== Main awards ===
Year	Mister Photogenic (since 1998)	Best Body (since 1999)	Mister Etiquette (Note: Miss Etiquette Award has been called as Mister Elegance (2004–2019).) (since 1999)	Mister Popularity (since 2001)	Mister Congeniality (since 2014)	Best Smile (since 2015)
2024	Franco Daniel Cova; Miranda	Juan Alberto García; Carabobo	Mike Durán; Distrito Capital	Winder Montaño; Distrito Capital	Alexander Valbuena; Barinas	Kenneth Bellorín; Nueva Esparta
2019	Not awarded	Jorge Eduardo Nuñez; Zulia	Leonardo Carrero; Mérida	Not awarded	Not awarded	Jorge Eduardo Nuñez; Zulia
2017	Not awarded	Christian Nunes; Distrito Capital	Elvis De Oliveira; Distrito Capital	Not awarded	Not awarded	Michael Roa; Distrito Capital
2016	Not awarded	Raúl Ramírez; Táchira	Not awarded	Not awarded	Not awarded	Renato Barabino; Aragua
2015	Not awarded	Gabriel Correa; Aragua	Not awarded	Not awarded	Not awarded	Rafael Oropeza; Lara
2014	Not awarded	Carlos Aguiar; Distrito Capital	Not awarded	Not awarded	Jonathan Negrón; Distrito Capital	
2005	José Luis Díaz; Guárico	Salvador Fonseca; Amazonas	Simón Valero; Miranda	Guillermo Seijas; Bolívar		
2004	Tomás Morales; Distrito Capital	Alejandro Ramírez; Península Goajira	Jean Claudio Palmegiani; Carabobo	Miguel Blanco; Anzoátegui		
2003	Not awarded	Jacinto Oropeza; Delta Amacuro	Irwing Ríos; Miranda	Vito Gasparrini; Mérida		
2001	Enrique Cuevas; Carabobo	Luis Nessy; Yaracuy	David Yañes; Portuguesa	Jesús García; Guárico		
2000	Deive Garcés; Carabobo	Cristóbal Lander; Miranda	Nicolás Invernizzi; Amazonas	First awarded 2001		
1999	Roy Pérez; Raúl Salazar	José Gabriel Madonia; Distrito Federal	Ezzio Cavallaro; Miranda	First awarded 2001		
1998	Numa Delgado; Distrito Federal	First awarded 1999	First awarded 1999	First awarded 2001		

=== Other awards ===
Current

Title	List
Best Look (since 2016)	List: 2016: Libio La Rovere (Trujillo) 2017: José Ricardo Rodulfo (Bolívar) 2019: Jorge Eduardo Nuñez (Zulia) 2024: Enrique Rivas (Distrito Capital)
Best Face (since 2024)	List: 2024: Dalberth Peña (Aragua)

Discontinued

Title	List
Best Actor (2015–2017)	List: 2015: Gabriel Correa (Aragua); Gibson Domínguez (Bolívar); Leonardo Pantoja (Distrito Capital); Rafael Angelucci (Lara) 2016: Jordan Piña (Lara) 2017: David Castro (Distrito Capital)
Best Host (2015–2017)	List: 2015: Georges Biloune (Lara) 2016: Jordan Piña (Lara) 2017: Alejandro Zumbo (Distrito Capital)
Best Singer (2016–2017)	List: 2016: Renzo La Posta (Guárico) 2017: Luis Marrero (Aragua)
Mister Personality (2017)	List: 2017: David Castro (Distrito Capital)
Mister Style (2017)	List: 2017: David Castro (Distrito Capital)
Mister Bionatural's (2019)	List: 2019: Armando Veitia (Aragua)

== See also ==
- List of Mister Venezuela editions
- List of Mister Venezuela titleholders
