= Daniel Navarrete =

Daniel Navarrete may refer to:

- Daniel Navarrete (model) (born 1977), Venezuelan model
- Daniel Navarrete (wrestler) (born 1963), Argentine wrestler
