= Luis Nery =

Luis Nery may refer to:

- Luis Nery (boxer) (born 1994), Mexican boxer
- Luis Nery (model) (born 1978), Venezuelan model
- Luis Nery Caballero (born 1990), Paraguayan footballer
