= Mister Venezuela 2004 =

8th Mister Venezuela pageant

- Date: June 19, 2004
- Presenters: Viviana Gibelli
- Entertainment: Las Cherries; Omar Enrique; Héctor Montaner; Andrés Mistage, Jacinto Oropeza, Claudio de la Torre
- Venue: Estudio 1 de Venevisión, Caracas, Venezuela
- Broadcaster: International: Univisión; Venevisión Continental; DirecTV; Official broadcaster: Venevisión
- Entrants: 22
- Placements: 10
- Winner: Francisco León; Amazonas
- Photogenic: Tomás Morales (Distrito Capital)
- Best Body: Alejandro Ramírez (Península Goajira)
- Elegance: Jean Claudio Palmegiani (Carabobo)

Mister Venezuela 2004 was the eighth Mister Venezuela pageant. It was held at the Estudio 1 de Venevisión in Caracas, Venezuela on June 19, 2004.

At the end of the event, Andrés Mistage of Carabobo titled Francisco León of Amazonas as Mister Venezuela 2004.

The runner-up position went to Miguel Blanco of Anzoátegui.

== Results ==
Color key

- Declared as winner
- Ended as runner-up
- Ended as top 5/8 qualification
- Ended as one of the finalists or semifinalists
- Ended as special awards winner

Placement	Contestant	International placement
Mister Venezuela 2004	Amazonas – Francisco León	
1st runner-up	Anzoátegui – Miguel Blanco	
2nd runner-up	Carabobo – Jean Claudio Palmegiani	
Top 10	Aragua – Julio Montenegro; Distrito Capital – Tomás Morales; Costa Oriental – Víctor Manuel Díaz; Delta Amacuro – Edgardo Escobar; Mérida – Alexander Slibe; Península Goajira – Alejandro Ramírez; Sucre – Gabriel Guerra	

=== Mr. Handsome International Venezuela 2004 ===
Placement	Contestant	International placement
Mr. Handsome International Venezuela 2004	Zulia – Juan Hilario Pérez	Mr. Handsome International 2004

== Contestants ==
22 contestants competed for the title.

State	Contestant	Age (Note: Ages at the time of the pageant)	Height	Hometown
Amazonas	Francisco León José Bastidas	22	1.90 m (6 ft 3 in)	Caracas
Anzoátegui	Miguel Antonio Blanco Sung	21	1.90 m (6 ft 3 in)	El Tigre
Aragua	Julio José Montenegro García	21	1.88 m (6 ft 2 in)	Caracas
Bolívar	Reinaldo José González Colmenares	20	1.84 m (6 ft 1/2 in)	Caracas
Carabobo	Jean Claudio Palmegiani La Cruz	22	1.88 m (6 ft 2 in)	Valencia
Cojedes	Luis Oswaldo Matheus García	19	1.90 m (6 ft 3 in)	Valencia
Costa Oriental	Víctor Manuel Díaz Pérez	19	1.83 m (6 ft 0 in)	Caracas
Delta Amacuro	Edgardo Escobar González	21	1.87 m (6 ft 1 1/2 in)	Caracas
Dependencias Federales	Leonardo Antonio De Sousa Teixeira	22	1.80 m (5 ft 11 in)	Caracas
Distrito Capital	Tomás Domingo Morales Morales	21	1.84 m (6 ft 1/2 in)	Caracas
Guárico	Jean Carlos Du Boulay Algarin	24	1.80 m (5 ft 11 in)	Caracas
Lara	Genderson Gordillo Giménez	21	1.82 m (5 ft 11 1/2 in)	Barquisimeto
Mérida	Isaa Alexander Slibe Zuleta	25	1.94 m (6 ft 4 1/2 in)	Caracas
Miranda	Heber Isaac Abelleira González	22	1.95 m (6 ft 5 in)	Caracas
Monagas	Jonathan José Trías Alemán	19	1.78 m (5 ft 10 in)	Lecherías
Península Goajira	Miguel Alejandro Ramírez González	24	1.90 m (6 ft 3 in)	Caracas
Portuguesa	Ender Alexander Martínez Torres	24	1.85 m (6 ft 1 in)	Guanare
Sucre	Juan Gabriel Guerra Bermúdez	26	1.87 m (6 ft 1 1/2 in)	Cumaná
Táchira	Jorge Jamal Baladi	22	1.87 m (6 ft 1 1/2 in)	Caracas
Trujillo	Marco Aurelio Ravelo Rodríguez	20	1.91 m (6 ft 3 in)	Caracas
Yaracuy	Marco Antonio Vilera González	19	1.86 m (6 ft 1 in)	Caracas
Zulia	Juan Hilario Pérez D'Amelio	20	1.85 m (6 ft 1 in)	Carora

Notes

- Juan Hilario Pérez (Zulia) won the Mister Handsome International 2004 title in the Dominican Republic.

=== Eliminated in reality show ===
6 contestants were eliminated from the competition in a previous round.

State	Contestant	Age	Height	Hometown
Apure	Ilber Alberto Vivas Rojas	22	1.93 m (6 ft 4 in)	Caracas
Barinas	Fedor Ernesto Rojas Goa	23	1.88 m (6 ft 2 in)	Caracas
Canaima	Jordán José Peña Maya	23	1.83 m (6 ft 0 in)	Valencia
Falcón	Alfredo Rafael Albornoz El-Mazry	21	1.83 m (6 ft 0 in)	Valencia
Nueva Esparta	Ricardo Adolfo Palacios Rodríguez	22	1.95 m (6 ft 5 in)	La Guaira
Vargas	Donny Rafael Muratty Ochoa	21	1.78 m (5 ft 10 in)	Caracas
