= Caracas Military Circle =

Building in Venezuela

- Caracas....Venezuela
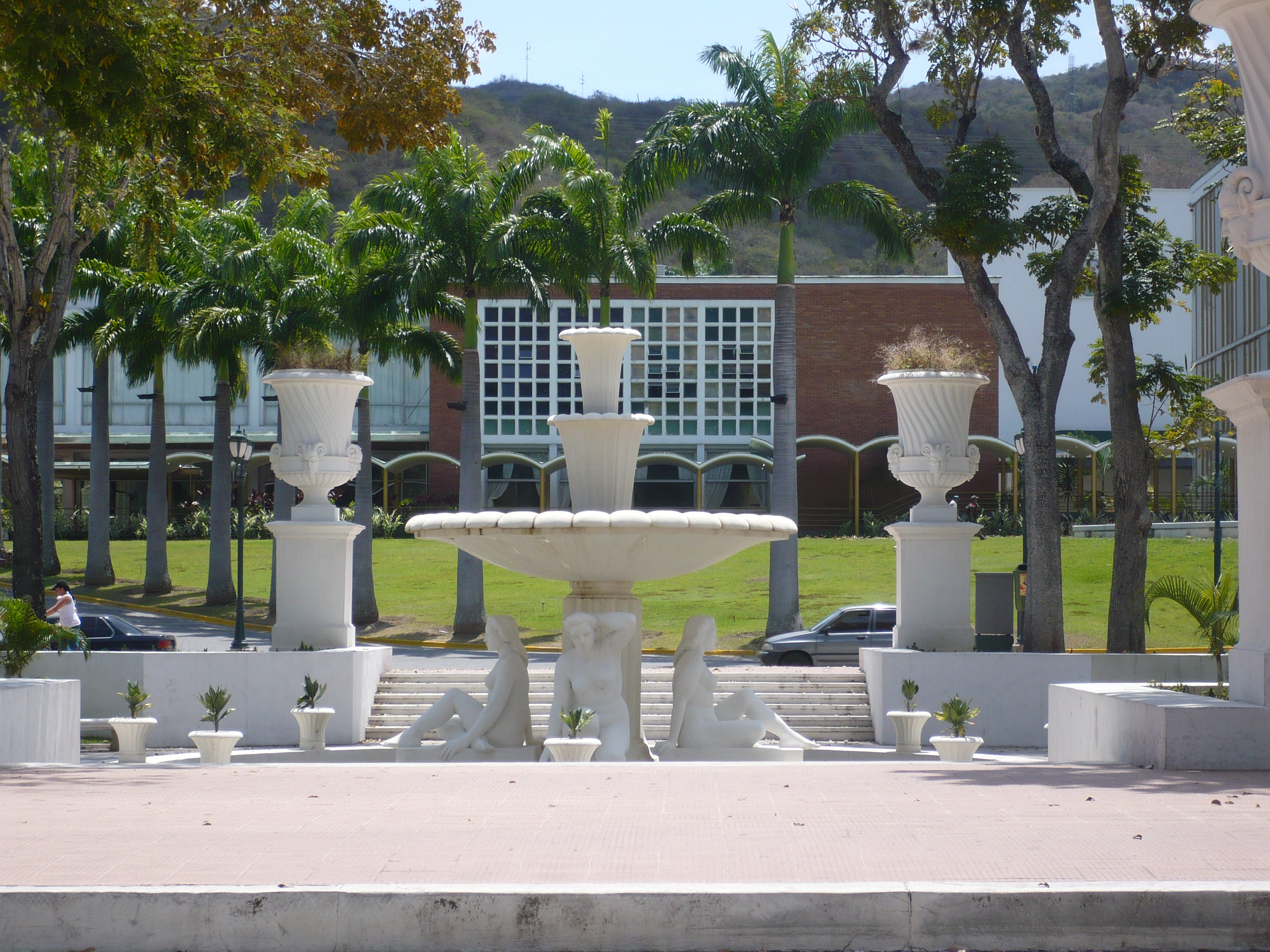
- Building View
- Area: Santa Mónica, Los Procéres Avenue

Site history
- Built: 1950-1953
- Built by: Ministry of Public Works

The Caracas Military Circle (Círculo Militar de Caracas) is a multipurpose complex located at the end of Los Próceres Avenue on Las Américas Boulevard in Santa Mónica, within the Libertador Municipality, west of the Caracas Metropolitan District, in northern Venezuela. It is currently administered by the Ministry of Defense of Venezuela.

== History ==
The complex was built on a group of former haciendas known as Conejo Blanco ("White Rabbit"), covering an area of 25 ha (62 acres). The project was proposed in 1943, and construction began in 1950 under the Ministry of Public Works. It was opened on December 2, 1953, by the government of General Marcos Pérez Jiménez. The architect was Luis Malaussena, who also designed the nearby Paseo La Nacionalidad (Nationality Walk).

Due to its historical significance and ornate architectural design, the complex was declared a national historic monument in 1994.

== Facilities ==
The Caracas Military Circle includes a military and social center, clubs, a theater, and a hotel.

== Recent developments ==
In 2014, funding was approved for the construction of a new five-star hotel within the complex.

== See also ==
- History of Venezuela
- Fort Tiuna
