= Mister Venezuela 2017 =

14th Mister Venezuela pageant

- Date: June 10, 2017
- Presenters: Fanny Otatti; Osmariel Villalobos; Dave Capella; Jesús De Alva
- Entertainment: Romina Palmisano
- Venue: Estudio 1 de Venevisión, Caracas, Venezuela
- Broadcaster: International: Univisión; Venevisión Plus; DirecTV; Official broadcaster: Venevisión
- Entrants: 14
- Placements: 6
- Winner: Christian Nunes; Caracas
- Best Body: Christian Nunes (Distrito Capital)
- Elegance: Elvis De Oliveira (Distrito Capital)

Mister Venezuela 2017 was the 14th Mister Venezuela pageant. It was held at the Estudio 1 de Venevisión in Caracas, Venezuela on June 10, 2017.

At the end of the event, Renato Barabino of Aragua titled Christian Nunes of Distrito Capital as Mister Venezuela 2017. He previously represented Venezuela at the Mister Universe 2015 pageant and then competed in Mister Global 2018 pageant placing in the Top 10.

The runner-up position went to Luis Marrero of Aragua.

== Pageant ==
=== Selection committee ===
The judges for Mister Venezuela include:

- Keysi Sayago – Miss Venezuela 2016 and Top 5 in Miss Universe 2017
- Romina Palmisano – Singer and Top 10 in Miss Venezuela 2010
- Vivian Felizola – Goldsmith
- Bárbara Sánchez – Radio host
- Natalia Moretti – Atómico host
- Dora Mazzone – Actress
- Natalia Monasterios – Portada's host

== Results ==
Color key

- Declared as winner
- Ended as runner-up
- Ended as top 5/8 qualification
- Ended as one of the finalists or semifinalists
- Ended as special awards winner

Placement	Contestant	International placement
Mister Venezuela 2017	Distrito Capital (No. 13) – Christian Nunes	Unplaced – Mister Universe 2015
Mister Venezuela 2017	Distrito Capital (No. 13) – Christian Nunes	Top 10 – Mister Global 2018
1st runner-up	Aragua (No. 12) – Luis Marrero	
2nd runner-up	Zulia (No. 14) – Adrián Menghini	
Top 6	Distrito Capital (No. 2) – David Castro; Bolívar (No. 7) – José Ricardo Rodulfo; Distrito Capital (No. 9) – Alejandro Zumbo	

=== Man of the World Venezuela 2023 ===
Placement	Contestant	International placement
Man of the World Venezuela 2023	Distrito Capital (No. 4) – Omar Riera	Top 17 – Man of the World 2023

=== Special awards ===
Award	Contestant
Best Actor	Distrito Capital (No. 2) – David Castro
Best Body	Distrito Capital (No. 13) – Christian Nunes
Best Host	Distrito Capital (No. 9) – Alejandro Zumbo
Best Look	Bolívar (No. 7) – José Ricardo Rodulfo
Best Singer	Aragua (No. 12) – Luis Marrero
Best Smile	Distrito Capital (No. 8) – Michael Roa
Mister Elegance	Distrito Capital (No. 11) – Elvis De Oliveira
Mister Personality	Distrito Capital (No. 2) – David Castro
Mister Style	Distrito Capital (No. 2) – David Castro

== Contestants ==
14 contestants competed for the title.

No.	Contestant	Age (Note: Ages at the time of the pageant)	Height	Hometown
1	Andrés Nardi Matos	21	1.83 m (6 ft 0 in)	Caracas
2	David Castro Gelman	25	1.81 m (5 ft 11 1/2 in)	Caracas
3	Javier David Adarfio Millán	21	1.77 m (5 ft 9 1/2 in)	Maturín
4	Omar Riera Sambrano	28	1.77 m (5 ft 9 1/2 in)	Caracas
5	Alejandro Antonio Guerra	22	1.80 m (5 ft 11 in)	Valle de la Pascua
6	Florentino Rodríguez Guerra	23	1.83 m (6 ft 0 in)	Guanare
7	José Ricardo Rodulfo Colina	22	1.82 m (5 ft 11 1/2 in)	Puerto Ordaz
8	Michael Roa Rico	26	1.82 m (5 ft 11 1/2 in)	Caracas
9	Alejandro Zumbo Ramírez	21	1.85 m (6 ft 1 in)	Caracas
10	Víctor Manuel Rodríguez Quijada	20	1.85 m (6 ft 1 in)	Caracas
11	Elvis Enrique De Oliveira Goncalves	24	1.88 m (6 ft 2 in)	Caracas
12	Luis Augusto Marrero Vera	21	1.90 m (6 ft 3 in)	Maracay
13	Christian Arnaldo Nunes Angulo	23	1.92 m (6 ft 3 1/2 in)	Caracas
14	Adrián Junior Menghini Abreu	25	1.91 m (6 ft 3 in)	Maracaibo

Notes

- Christian Nunes (No. 13) unplaced in Mister Universe 2015 in Santo Domingo, Dominican Republic and placed as Top 10 in Mister Global 2018 in Bangkok, Thailand.
- Omar Riera (No. 4) placed as Top 17 in Man of the World 2023 in Makati, Philippines.
