= National Theatre of Venezuela =

Coordinates: 10.5009°N 66.9155°W

National Theater of Venezuela
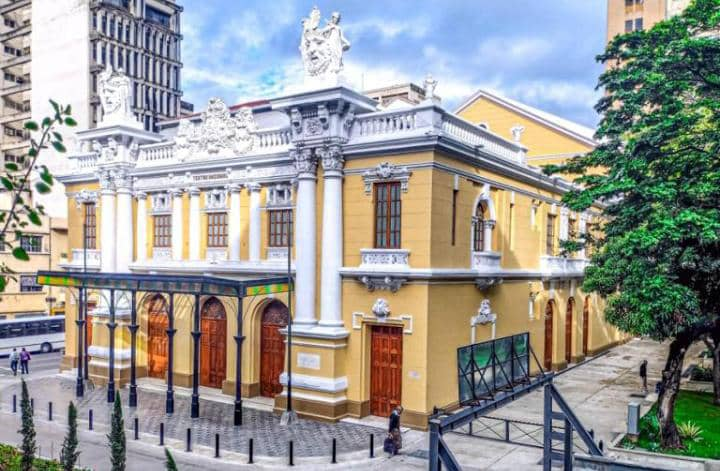
- Address: Esquina Miracielos a Cipreses, Santa Teresa Parish; Caracas; Venezuela
- Type: Opera
- Capacity: 664

Construction
- Opened: June 11, 1905
- Architect: Alejandro Chataing

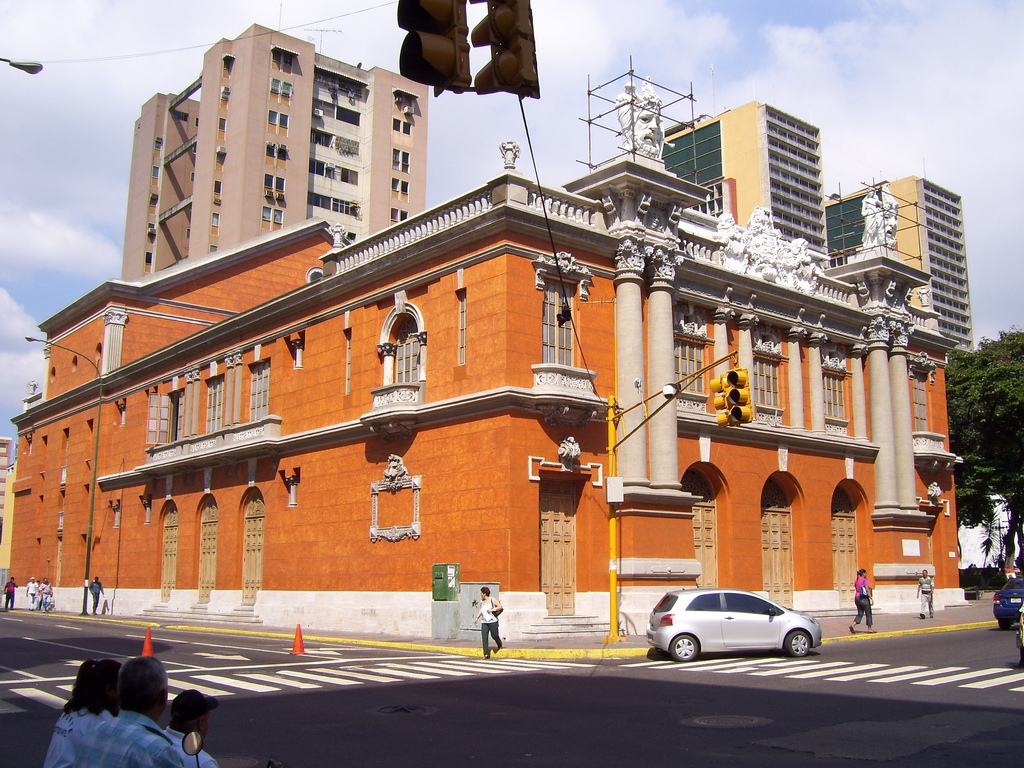
The building of the Teatro Nacional de Venezuela

The Teatro Nacional de Venezuela is a building (opened 1905) and associated theatre company in Caracas. The theatre presents plays, operas and zarzuelas. It was re-named after Román Chalbaud shortly after the death of this Venezuelan film director, screenwriter and playwright.
