= Mister Venezuela 2003 =

7th Mister Venezuela pageant

- Date: July 26, 2003
- Presenters: Viviana Gibelli
- Entertainment: Daniel Elbittar; Propuesta Indecente; Voz Veis; Yaire
- Venue: Estudio 1 de Venevisión, Caracas, Venezuela
- Broadcaster: International: Univisión; Venevisión Continental; DirecTV; Official broadcaster: Venevisión
- Entrants: 16
- Placements: 10
- Winner: Andrés Mistage; Carabobo
- Best Body: Jacinto Oropeza (Delta Amacuro)
- Etiquette: Irwing Ríos (Miranda)

Mister Venezuela 2003 was the seventh Mister Venezuela pageant. It was held at the Estudio 1 de Venevisión in Caracas, Venezuela on July 26, 2003.

At the end of the event, Daniel Navarrete of Vargas titled Andrés Mistage of Carabobo as Mister Venezuela 2003. He represented Venezuela at the Mister World 2003 pageant placing in the Top 10.

The runner-up position went to Jacinto Oropeza of Delta Amacuro.

== Results ==
Color key

- Declared as winner
- Ended as runner-up
- Ended as top 5/8 qualification
- Ended as one of the finalists or semifinalists
- Ended as special awards winner

Placement	Contestant	International placement
Mister Venezuela 2003	Carabobo – Andrés Mistage	Top 10 – Mister World 2003
1st runner-up	Delta Amacuro – Jacinto Oropeza	
2nd runner-up	Anzoátegui – Claudio de la Torre	Top 15 – Manhunt International 2005
Top 10	Bolívar – Julio Vívenes; Cojedes – Antonio Rojas; Dependencias Federales – Richard De Stefano; Mérida – Vito Gasparrini; Miranda – Irwing Ríos; Nueva Esparta – César Augusto Flores; Zulia – Ángel Pérez	

=== Mr. Handsome International Venezuela 2002 ===
Placement	Contestant	International placement
Mr. Handsome International Venezuela 2002	Vargas – Alberto Bachour	Mr. Handsome International 2002 (Margarita Island representative) (Resigned)

== Contestants ==
16 contestants competed for the title.

State	Contestant	Age (Note: Ages at the time of the pageant)	Height	Hometown
Anzoátegui	Claudio Alfredo de la Torre Laya	22	1.89 m (6 ft 2 1/2 in)	Barcelona
Amazona	Roberto José Urbano	22	1.90 m (6 ft 3 in)	Maracay
Bolívar	Julio César Vívenes Villavicencio	21	1.90 m (6 ft 3 in)	San Diego
Canaima	Iván Guillermo Medina Valbuena	24	1.80 m (5 ft 11 in)	Maracaibo
Carabobo	Andrés Eduardo Mistage Parilli	21	1.91 m (6 ft 3 in)	Valencia
Cojedes	Antonio José Rojas Cabrera	22	1.87 m (6 ft 1 1/2 in)	Caracas
Delta Amacuro	Jacinto Rafael Oropeza Soteldo	23	1.90 m (6 ft 3 in)	Barquisimeto
Dependencias Federales	Richard De Stefano Jiménez	26	1.88 m (6 ft 2 in)	Caracas
Guárico	Simón Lorenzo Goncalves Rubio	21	1.87 m (6 ft 1 1/2 in)	La Guaira
Lara	José Manuel Pereiro Barbera	19	1.94 m (6 ft 4 1/2 in)	Barquisimeto
Mérida	Vito Ernesto Gasparrini Domínguez	27	1.92 m (6 ft 3 1/2 in)	Caracas
Miranda	Irwing Enrique Ríos Torres	22	1.90 m (6 ft 3 in)	Caracas
Nueva Esparta	César Augusto Flores Mendoza	22	1.87 m (6 ft 1 1/2 in)	Caracas
Península Goajira	Michele Giurdanella Mesci	26	1.90 m (6 ft 3 in)	Maracaibo
Portuguesa	Eddy Rafael Márquez Guzmán	24	1.91 m (6 ft 3 in)	Caracas
Zulia	Ángel Alberto Pérez Angulo	27	1.89 m (6 ft 2 1/2 in)	Maracaibo

Notes

- Andrés Mistage (Carabobo) placed as Top 10 in Mister World 2003 in London, England.
- Claudio de la Torre (Anzoátegui) placed as Top 15 in Manhunt International 2005 in Busan, Korea
- Vito Gasparrini (Mérida) would later compete in Mister Venezuela 2006 winning the title.
- Richard De Stefano (Dependencias Federales) won the Male International Model 2003 competition as Italy representative.
- Claudio de la Torre (Anzoátegui) and César Augusto Flores (Nueva Esparta) became actors.
