= Mister Venezuela 2019 =

15th Mister Venezuela pageant

- Date: April 13, 2019
- Presenters: Fanny Otatti; Isabella Rodríguez; Jesús De Alva
- Venue: Estudio 1 de Venevisión, Caracas, Venezuela
- Broadcaster: International: Univisión; Ve Plus TV; DirecTV; Official broadcaster: Venevisión
- Entrants: 14
- Placements: 5
- Winner: Jorge Eduardo Nuñez; Zulia
- Best Body: Jorge Eduardo Nuñez (Zulia)
- Elegance: Leonardo Carrero (Mérida)

Mister Venezuela 2019 was the 15th Mister Venezuela pageant. It was held at the Estudio 1 de Venevisión in Caracas, Venezuela on April 13, 2019.

At the end of the event, Christian Nunes of Distrito Capital titled Jorge Eduardo Nuñez of Zulia as Mister Venezuela 2019. He represented Venezuela at the Mister World 2019 pageant placing in the Top 29 and then in Mister Supranational 2023 pageant.

The runner-up position went to Leonardo Carrero of Mérida.

== Pageant ==
=== Selection committee ===
The judges for Mister Venezuela include:

- María Antonieta Duque – Actress
- Silvana Santaella – 1st runner-up in Miss Venezuela 2003, Miss Italia nel Mondo 2004 and Miss Earth – Water 2007
- Camela Longo – Journalist
- Marie Claire Harp – Miss Falcón 2013 and host
- Natalia Monasterios – Venezuelan host
- Annaé Torrealba – Model and singer

== Results ==
Color key

- Declared as winner
- Ended as runner-up
- Ended as top 5/8 qualification
- Ended as one of the finalists or semifinalists
- Ended as special awards winner

Placement	Contestant	International placement
Mister Venezuela 2019	Zulia (No. 9) – Jorge Eduardo Nuñez	Top 29 – Mister World 2019
Mister Venezuela 2019	Zulia (No. 9) – Jorge Eduardo Nuñez	Unplaced (Top 25) – Mister Supranational 2023
1st runner-up	Mérida (No. 13) – Leonardo Carrero	4th runner-up – Mister Supranational 2019
2nd runner-up	Aragua (No. 3) – Armando Veitia	
Top 5	Distrito Capital (No. 8) – Carlos Guédez	Unplaced – Mister Universe 2019 (Margarita Island representative)
Top 5	Distrito Capital (No. 11) – Emmanuel Serrano	Top 15 – Mister International 2024

=== Special awards ===
Award	Contestant
Best Body	Zulia (No. 9) – Jorge Eduardo Nuñez
Best Look	Zulia (No. 9) – Jorge Eduardo Nuñez
Best Smile	Zulia (No. 9) – Jorge Eduardo Nuñez
Mister Bionatural's	Aragua (No. 3) – Armando Veitia
Mister Elegance	Mérida (No. 13) – Leonardo Carrero

== Contestants ==
14 contestants competed for the title.

No.	Contestant	Age (Note: Ages at the time of the pageant)	Height	Hometown
1	Oswaldo Petit	25	1.77 m (5 ft 9 1/2 in)	Barinas
2	Jorge Luis Hernández	23	1.75 m (5 ft 9 in)	Caracas
3	Armando Rafael Veitia Navarro	25	1.79 m (5 ft 10 1/2 in)	Maracay
4	Humberto Inciarte	21	1.78 m (5 ft 10 in)	Guanare
5	Jesmar Vega	18	1.83 m (6 ft 0 in)	Caracas
6	Carlos Colmenares	19	1.83 m (6 ft 0 in)	Caracas
7	Alejandro Mijares	20	1.83 m (6 ft 0 in)	Caracas
8	Carlos Alberto Guédez Díaz	25	1.83 m (6 ft 0 in)	Caracas
9	Jorge Eduardo Nuñez Matínez	24	1.85 m (6 ft 1 in)	Cabimas
10	Alexander Duque	22	1.84 m (6 ft 1/2 in)	Caracas
11	Emmanuel Serrano	26	1.85 m (6 ft 1 in)	Caracas
12	José Perdomo	20	1.87 m (6 ft 1 1/2 in)	Mérida
13	Leonardo Carrero Contreras	26	1.91 m (6 ft 3 in)	El Vigía
14	Yosmar González	21	1.91 m (6 ft 3 in)	Maracaibo

Notes

- Jorge Eduardo Nuñez (No. 9) placed as Top 29 in Mister World 2019 in Quezon City, Philippines; then he won Supranational Venezuela 2022 pageant, competing after in Mister Supranational 2023 in Malopolska, Poland.
- Leonardo Carrero (No. 13) placed as 4th runner-up in Mister Supranational 2019 in Krynica-Zdrój, Poland.
- Carlos Guédez (No. 8) unplaced as Margarita Island representative in Mister Universe 2019 in Puerto Plata, Dominican Republic.
- Emmanuel Serrano (No. 11) placed as Top 15 in Mister International 2024 in Thailand.
- Leonardo Carrero (No. 13) became a TV host.
