= Hotel Venetur Alba Caracas =

Coordinates: 10°30′1.77″N 66°53′57.82″W

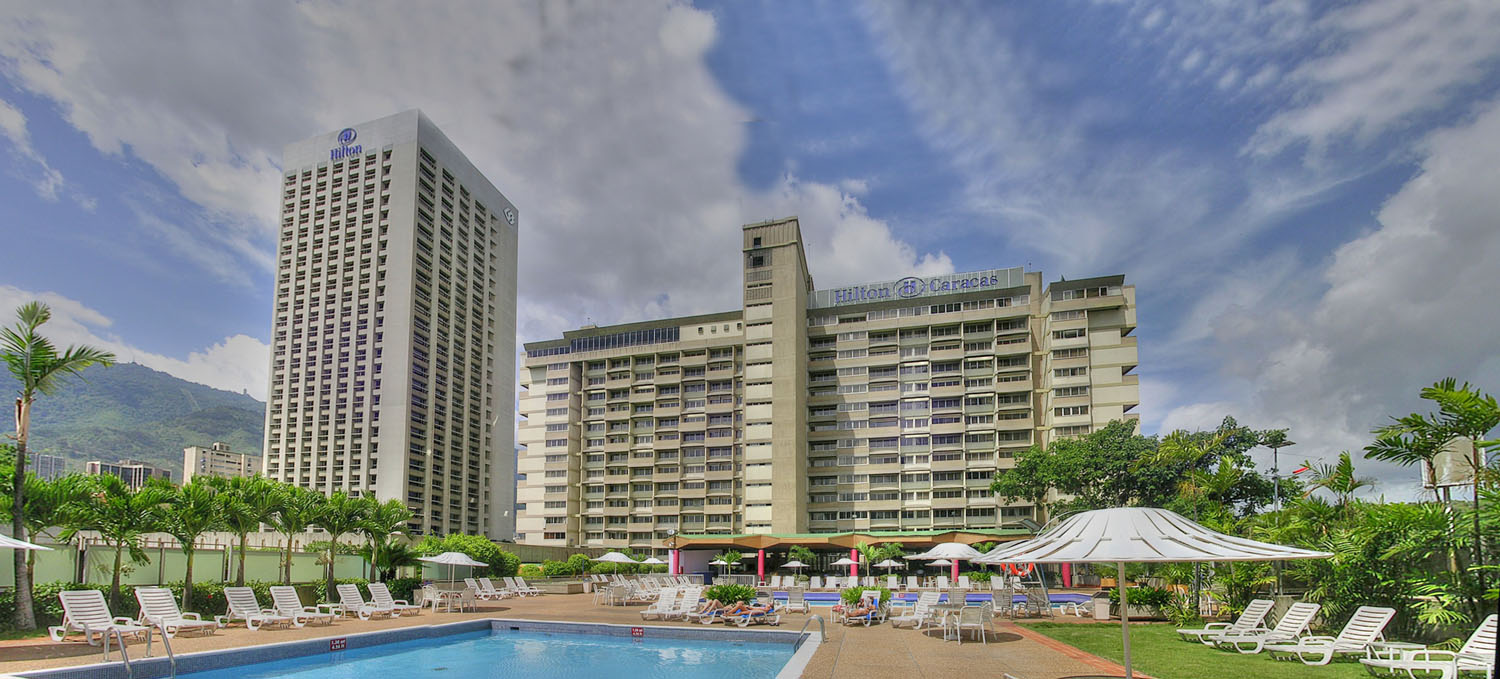
- Interactive map of the Hotel Venetur Alba Caracas area

General information
- Status: Completed
- Type: Hotel; Suites; Conferences Center
- Location: Caracas, Venezuela
- Completed: 1969
- Owner: Venezuelan State

Height
- Roof: 120 m (390 ft)

Technical details
- Floor count: 36

Design and construction
- Developer: Venezolana de Turismo (VENETUR)
- Structural engineer: Juan Sánchez Carranza
- Main contractor: Centro Simón Bolívar

The Hotel Venetur Alba Caracas is a hotel in the cultural and financial center of Caracas, Venezuela. It is located between Av. Mexico with Av. Sur 25. It overlooks El Ávila National Park and Los Caobos Park and has direct access to the Caracas Metro.

== History ==
In the 1930s, coffee plantations covered the hotel site. In 1944, the area became the first corporate headquarters of the Creole Petroleum Corporation. In 1955, the headquarters became a National Security government building government of Marcos Pérez Jiménez. In 1965, engineer Juan Sánchez Carranza was chosen to construct an apartment building on the site, which was completed the following year. However, before residents moved in, the building was repurposed as a luxury hotel and rebuilt.

The hotel was officially opened by President Rafael Caldera on October 31, 1969 as the Caracas Hilton. In 1984, a tower wing was added designed by Edmundo Díquez.

In 2007, the government-owned hotel let its management contract with Hilton lapse after 38 years. The hotel was renamed Hotel Alba Caracas, after the ALBA, Hugo Chávez's "Bolivarian Alliance for the Peoples of Our America" and was revamped as a "socialist" hotel. On April 15, 2010, it was placed under the management of the state-run Venetur group.
