= Universidad Nueva Esparta =

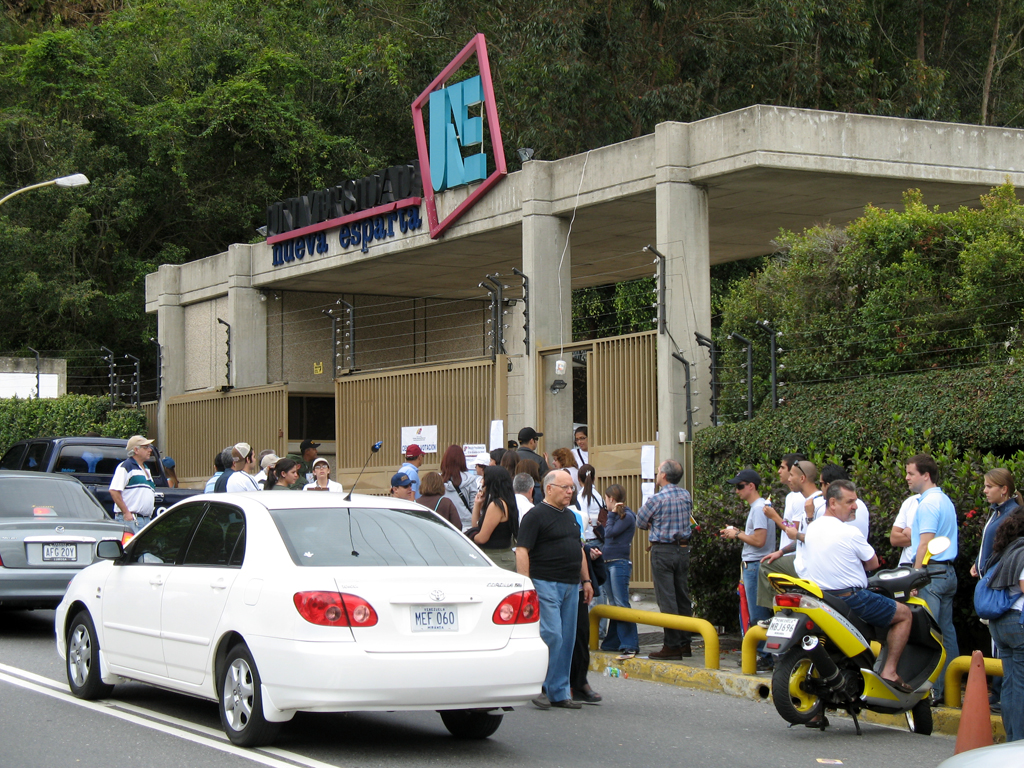
- Motto: Pasión por el futuro
- Motto in English: Passion for the future
- Type: Private
- Established: 20 September 1954 (as Colegio Nueva Esparta)
- Rector: Prof. Gladys J. Carmona de Marcano
- Students: Uneistas
- Location: Caracas, Venezuela
- Campus: Los Naranjos, Caracas
- Website: une.edu.ve

Universidad Nueva Esparta is a private university in Caracas, Venezuela. It was founded in 1954 by Dr. Juan Bautista Marcano Marcano and Prof. Gladys J. Carmona de Marcano.

The University is located in Los Naranjos, Caracas, and operated as an Institute until it met requisites to become a full University. Career options such as Computer Science, Civil Engineering, Graphic Design, and Electronic Engineering are offered on campus.
