= Yaire =

Puerto Rican musician (born 1977)

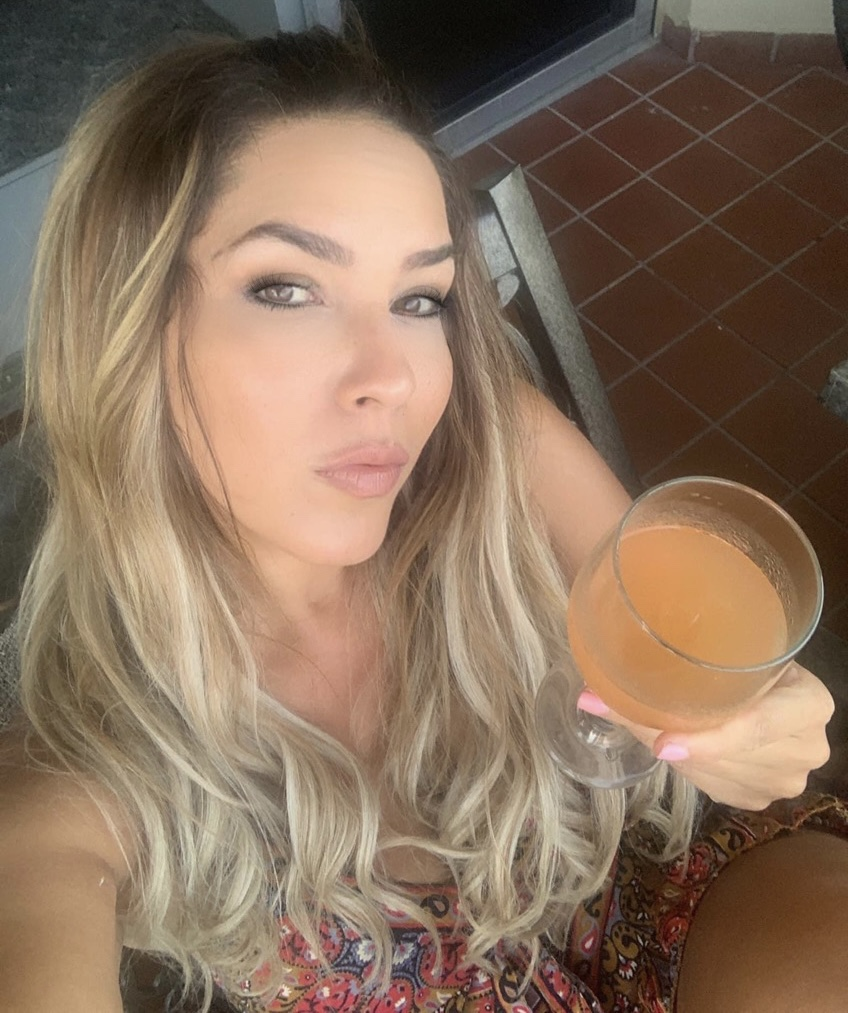

Background information
- Also known as: Yaire
- Born: Yaidelice Monrouzeau Marrero; July 29, 1977 (age 48)
- Origin: San Juan, Puerto Rico
- Genres: Latin / Pop
- Occupation(s): Singer-songwriter, record producer, musician, author
- Instrument(s): Vocals, guitar, keyboard songwriter
- Years active: 1994–present
- Labels: Universal (1998); Lideres (2001–2002); EMI (2005); Crazy Moods Music (2006–present)
- Website: yairemusic.com

Yaire (born Yaidelice Monrouzeau; 29 July 1977) is a singer-songwriter from Puerto Rico, who’s emblematic hits "Tu mayor tentación", "Contéstame", “Dime” and "Te amo tanto" have helped her garner critical praise as well as mainstream musical success in Puerto Rico and other latin markets in South and Central America, the United States and Spain. As a composer, she has written many famous hits for artists like Olga Tañón, Melina León and Gisselle, among others. Her musical style has a wide range and goes from power ballads to pop rock and up-tempo numbers. She is most recognized for her impressive 3.5-octave voice, her dramatic live song interpretations and award-winning writing abilities.

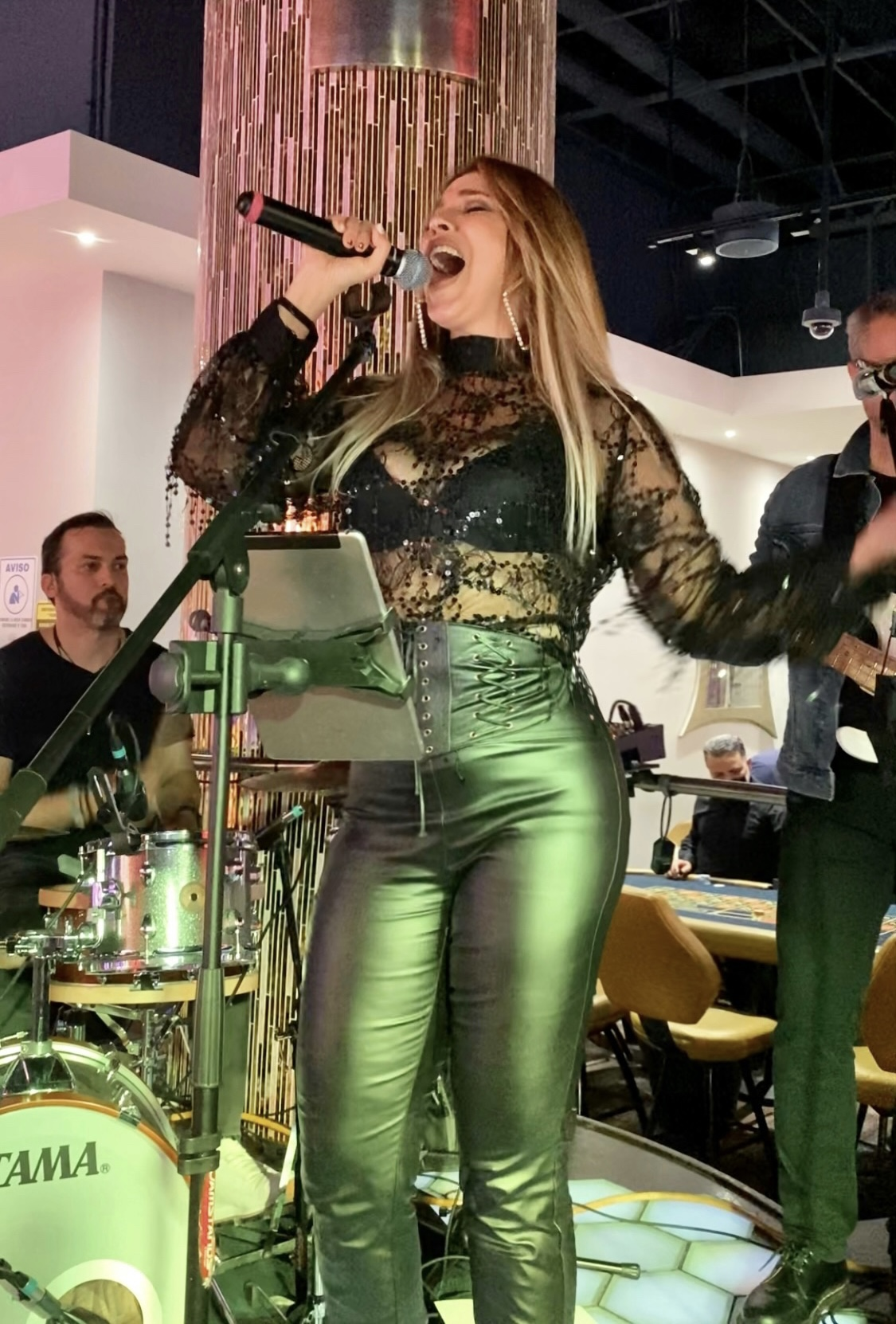
Yaire singing live in concert

== Biography ==
Daughter of Iris Marrero and the Puerto Rican pianist and one man band, Eloy Monrouzeau, Yaire entered the music industry at an early age, where she spent several years writing and composing for numerous mainstays in the Latin industry, eventually winning a writing award from ASCAP for the 1993 Olga Tañón hit, Mujer de Fuego. Yaire soon became a performer herself, making her singing debut in Juventud Vibra, her TV debut in Voces en Función and then, releasing a debut album, Formas de Vida, in 1998. Soon after she moved to Madrid, Spain, from where she worked on her three follow up albums: 2001's Yaire, a commercial success that spawned several radio and video hits; 2002's ...Donde Me Lleve El Viento; and 2005's Volver A Nacer.

Yaire is currently living in Puerto Rico and continues writing and producing music for herself and other artists, and has consistently and successfully kept performing live sold out shows in different venues throughout the island. She is currently working on her forthcoming musical projects, soon to be unveiled.

== Personal life ==
Yaire was married to Spanish producer Miguel Blasco. After marrying him she moved to Spain and on February 13, 2008 she gave birth to her first child, a baby boy named Adam Blasco Monrouzeau. Her marriage eventually ended up in divorce and Yaire now lives happily in Puerto Rico with her son and loving family.

Yaire is very private with her personal life but continues to share on social media a glimpse into her daily life, which now focuses only on her main passions: raising her son, writing and creating music, teaching and producing new talent, while continuing and evolving her music career.

== Discography ==
- Formas De Vida (1998)
- Yaire (2001)
- ...Donde Me Lleve El Viento (2002)
- Volver a Nacer (2005)
- Falso Paraiso (2011)

== See also ==
- Music of Puerto Rico
- List of Puerto Ricans
- List of Puerto Rican songwriters
- List of singer-songwriters
