= Man of the World 2023 =

5th Man of the World competition (2023), international male beauty pageant edition

- Date: 16 June 2023
- Presenters: Samantha Bernardo; Matthias Rhoads
- Venue: Samsung Performing Arts Theater, Makati, Philippines
- Entrants: 24
- Placements: 17
- Debuts: Angola; Cuba; Turkey; United Kingdom; Venezuela; Zimbabwe
- Withdrawals: Austria; Chile; Ecuador; Haiti; Jordan; Kenya; Morocco; Namibia; Netherlands; Sri Lanka; Tanzania; Trinidad and Tobago; Tunisia
- Returns: Cape Verde; Hong Kong; Myanmar; Singapore
- Winner: Jin Wook Kim; South Korea
- Congeniality: Jin Wook Kim (South Korea)
- Best National Costume: Leonardus Toni Setiyawan (Indonesia)
- Photogenic: Henry Wong (Hong Kong)

Man of the World 2023 was the fifth edition of the Man of the World competition, held at the Samsung Performing Arts Theater in Makati, Metro Manila, Philippines, on 16 June 2023.

Aditya Khurana of India crowned Jin Wook Kim of South Korea as his successor at the end of the event.

== Results ==
=== Placements ===
Placement	Contestant
Man of the World 2023	South Korea – Jin Wook Kim
1st Runner-Up	Hong Kong – Henry Wong
2nd Runner-Up	Philippines – James Reggie Vidal
3rd Runner-Up	Puerto Rico – Robert Alexander Espaillat §
4th Runner-Up	Vietnam – Kim Khánh Lâm
Top 10	Angola – Jeremias Toco; Czech Republic – Honza Balšán; Malaysia – Jonathan Liaw; Myanmar – Henry San; Nepal – Bishal Katwal §
Top 17	Cape Verde – Elvis Duarte; Cuba – Alex Soto; Nigeria – Alexander Joseph-Ojiavor; Singapore – Tavis Lee; Spain – Cristian Arteaga; United States – Tyler Vincent Gaumer; Venezuela – Omar Riera

§ Automatic placement in the Top 17

=== Fast Track Events ===
Fast track winners automatically advanced to the Top 17.

Placement	Contestant
Multimedia Award	Nepal - Bishal Katwal
People's Choice	Puerto Rico - Robert Alexander Espaillat

=== Special awards ===
Categories	Medalists
Best in National Costume	(gold) Indonesia – Leonardus Toni Setiyawan; (silver) Philippines – James Reggie Vidal; (bronze) Dominican Republic - Rikaury Mieses
Best in Swimwear	(gold) Czech Republic – Honza Balšán; (silver) Spain – Cristian Arteaga; (bronze) South Korea - Jin Wook Kim; (bronze) Vietnam - Kim Khánh Lâm
Best in Beachwear	(gold) South Korea – Jin Wook Kim; (silver) Spain – Cristian Arteaga; (bronze) Myanmar - Henry San
Best in Formal Wear	(gold) South Korea – Jin Wook Kim; (silver) Czech Republic – Honza Balšán; (bronze) Nigeria - Alexander Joseph-Ojiavor
Fashion of the World	(gold) Philippines – James Reggie Vidal; (silver) South Korea – Jin Wook Kim; (bronze) Spain - Cristian Arteaga
Mister Photogenic	(gold) Hong Kong – Henry Wong; (silver) Dominican Republic – Rikaury Mieses; (bronze) South Korea - Jin Wook Kim
Mister Personality	(gold) Nepal – Bishal Katwal; (silver) Cuba – Alex Soto; (silver) Singapore – Tavis Lee; (bronze) India - Baskar Dhanasekar; (bronze) Nigeria - Alexander Joseph-Ojiavor
Mister Congeniality	(gold) South Korea - Jin Wook Kim; (silver) Angola – Jeremias Toco; (silver) Myanmar – Henry San; (bronze) Philippines - James Reggie Vidal; (bronze) Venezuela - Omar Riera
Best Physique	(gold) Cape Verde – Elvis Duarte; (silver) Puerto Rico – Robert Alexander Espaillat; (silver) Vietnam – Kim Khánh Lâm; (bronze) United States - Tyler Vincent Gaumer; (bronze) Venezuela - Omar Riera
Best in Arrival Outfit	(gold) Dominican Republic – Rikaury Mieses; (silver) Hong Kong – Henry Wong; (bronze) Malaysia - Jonathan Liaw
Press Favorite	(gold) Vietnam – Kim Khánh Lâm; (silver) Philippines – James Reggie Vidal; (bronze) Venezuela - Omar Riera
Man of Travel - Holiday Inn Express Manila	Philippines – James Reggie Vidal

Order of Announcements

Top 17

1. Nepal
2. Puerto Rico
3. Angola
4. Cape Verde
5. Cuba
6. Czech Republic
7. Hong Kong
8. South Korea
9. Malaysia
10. Myanmar
11. Nigeria
12. Philippines
13. Singapore
14. Spain
15. United States
16. Venezuela
17. Vietnam

Top 10

1. South Korea
2. Vietnam
3. Czech Republic
4. Puerto Rico
5. Myanmar
6. Philippines
7. Hong Kong
8. Angola
9. Nepal
10. Malaysia

Top 5

1. Puerto Rico
2. Vietnam
3. South Korea
4. Hong Kong
5. Philippines

== Contestants ==
Country	Contestant	Reference
Angola	Jeremias Toco	
Cape Verde	Elvis Duarte	
Cuba	Alex Soto	
Czech Republic	Honza Balšán	
Dominican Republic	Rikaury Mieses	
Hong Kong	Henry Wong	
India	Baskar Dhanasekar	
Indonesia	Leonardus Toni Setiyawan	
Iran	Aldo Razmjoo	
Malaysia	Jonathan Liaw	
Myanmar	Henry San	
Nepal	Bishal Katwal	
Nigeria	Alexander Joseph-Ojiavor	
Philippines	James Reggie Vidal	
Puerto Rico	Robert Alexander Espaillat	
Singapore	Tavis Lee	
South Korea	Jin Wook Kim	
Spain	Cristian Arteaga	
Turkey	Mohamed Emir	
United Kingdom	Luke Selby	
United States	Tyler Vincent Gaumer	
Venezuela	Omar Riera	
Vietnam	Kim Khánh Lâm	
Zimbabwe	Chris Ncube	

== Notes ==
=== Crossovers ===
Mister Tourism World

- 2022: Cuba - Alex Soto (Top 17)

Mister Africa International

- 2021: Cape Verde - Elvis Duarte

Mister World Noble King

- 2023: Iran - Aldo Razmjoo

Mister Beauté Internationale

- 2022: Turkey - Mohamed Emir

Top Model of the Universe

- 2022: Tunisia - Mohamed Emir
