= Mister Venezuela 1996 =

1st edition of the Mister Venezuela competition

- Date: July 17, 1996
- Presenters: Maite Delgado
- Entertainment: Las Chicas del Can; Johnny Nessy, Jorge Aravena, José Ángel Ávila; Gabriela Rodríguez, Irma Palmieri; Mercedes Salaya, Beba Rojas; Kiara
- Venue: Estudio 1 de Venevisión, Caracas, Venezuela
- Broadcaster: International: Venevisión Continental; DirecTV; Official broadcaster: Venevisión
- Entrants: 20
- Placements: 5
- Winner: José Gregorio Faría; Zulia

Mister Venezuela 1996 was the 1st edition of the Mister Venezuela competition, held on July 17, 1996, at the Estudio 1 de Venevisión in Caracas, Venezuela.

At the end of the event, Carla Steinkopf, Miss Venezuela International 1995 and Pilín León, Miss World 1981, titled José Gregorio Faría of Zulia as Mister Venezuela 1996.

The 1st runner-up position went to Johnny Essig of Distrito Federal.

== Results ==
Color key

- Declared as winner
- Ended as runner-up
- Ended as top 5/8 qualification
- Ended as one of the finalists or semifinalists
- Ended as special awards winner

Placement	Contestant	International placement
Mister Venezuela 1996	(#20) – José Gregorio Faría (Zulia)	Unplaced – Mister World 1996
1st Runner-Up	(#4) – Jhonny Essig (Caracas)	
Top 5	(#2) – Eduardo Quintana (Caracas) (2nd Runner-Up); (#11) – Christian Zia (Aragua) (3rd Runner-Up); (#1) – Alberto Bahamonde (Caracas) (4th Runner-Up)	

=== International Male Model Venezuela 1999 ===
Placement	Contestant	International placement
International Male Model Venezuela 1999	(No. 17) – Roberto Rondón	International Male Model 1999

== Pageant ==
=== Selection committee ===
==== Final telecast ====
- Sonia Roffé – Miss Venezuela Organization dermatologist
- Carla Steinkopf – Miss International Venezuela 1995 and Top 15 in Miss International 1996
- Carmen Montoya – Eurobuilding Hotel public relations and advertising manager
- Pilín León – 1st Runner-Up in Miss Venezuela 1981 and Miss World 1981
- Mónica Lei – Lawyer, Miss World Venezuela 1993 and 4th Runner-Up in Miss World 1993
- Irene Ferreria – Miss World Venezuela 1994 and 2nd Runner-Up in Miss World 1994
- Minorka Mercado – Miss Venezuela 1993 and 2nd Runner-Up in Miss Universe 1994
- Luisa Guardia-Machado – Caracas high society lady
- Elizabeth Otaola de Rotundo – Caracas high society lady
- Luna Sultán Aserrath – Caracas high society lady

== Contestants ==
20 contestants competed for the title.

#	Contestant	Age (Note: Ages at the time of the pageant)	Height	Hometown
1	Alberto Bahamonde	24		Caracas
2	Eduardo Quintana García	25		Caracas
3	Alexander Camerlingo	23		
4	Johnny Essig Tortolero	25		Caracas
5	Ángel Pérez	21		
6	Winston Teofilactes Vallenilla Hazell	22		Caracas
7	Pierre Merson	21		
8	Alejandro Perronis	18		
9	Enrique Castañeda	21		
10	Manuel Andara	25		Caracas
11	Christian Zia	22		Maracay
12	Héctor Ragussa	20		
13	Simone Angelini	21		
14	Giovanni Donnis			
15	Marcelo Crudele	24		
16	Javier Gómez	23		
17	Roberto Rondón	18		
18	Rodolfo José Renwick Vargas	23	1.91 m (6 ft 3 in)	Caracas
19	Pablo Ernesto Martin Escobar	24		Caracas
20	José Gregorio Faría Ojeda	25	1.88 m (6 ft 2 in)	Maracaibo

Notes

- Johnny Essig (#4), Eduardo Quintana (#2), Rodolfo Rendwick (#18) and Pablo Martin (#19) became actors. Winston Vallenilla (#6), also an actor entered later into politics.
