= Claudio de la Torre (actor) =

Venezuelan male model and actor (born 1980)

- Born: Claudio Alfredo De La Torre Laya; November 22, 1980 (age 44); Venezuela
- Occupation(s): Actor, Model

Claudio de la Torre (born 22 November 1980) is a Venezuelan male model and actor.

== Biography ==
De la Torre participated in the Mister Venezuela competition in 2003, representing Anzoátegui State. During the competition, he emerged as the third finalist. After the competition, he went into acting and joined the acting school Luz Columba. He was a model until he obtained his first television role in 2009 in the Venevisión telenovela Tomasa Tequiero.

In 2011, he played the supporting role of Enmanuel Madero in the telenovela La viuda joven.

In 2014, he was cast in the telenovela Amor Secreto.

== Telenovelas ==
Year	Title	Role
2009	Tomasa Tequiero	Francisco Hurtado
2011	La viuda joven	Emmanuel Madero
2014	Amor secreto	Felipe Rincón
2016	Corazón traicionado	
2025	Velvet: El nuevo imperio	Rodrigo

== Theater ==
- Los hombres no mienten (2013)
- Malos entendidos (2014)
- Crónicas Desquiciadas (2015)

Awards and achievements
Preceded by (Vargas, Venezuela) Daniel Navarrete	Manhunt Venezuela; 2005	Succeeded by (Lara, Venezuela) Miguel Ángel Brito
Preceded by (Delta Amacuro) César Suárez	Mister Venezuela 2nd Runner-up; 2003	Succeeded by (Carabobo) Jean Claudio Palmegiani
