= Mister Venezuela 2000 =

5th Mister Venezuela pageant

- Date: November 22, 2000
- Presenters: Viviana Gibelli
- Entertainment: A.5; Jump; Maracaibo 15
- Venue: Estudio 1 de Venevisión, Caracas, Venezuela
- Broadcaster: International: Univisión; Venevisión Continental; DirecTV; Official broadcaster: Venevisión
- Entrants: 26
- Placements: 10
- Winner: Luis Nery; Península Goajira
- Photogenic: Deive Garcés (Carabobo)
- Best Body: Cristóbal Lander (Miranda)
- Etiquette: Nicolás Invernizzi (Amazonas)

Mister Venezuela 2000 was the fifth Mister Venezuela pageant. It was held at the Estudio 1 de Venevisión in Caracas, Venezuela on November 22, 2000.

At the end of the event, Alejandro Otero of Distrito Federal titled Luis Nery of Península Goajira as Mister Venezuela 2000. He represented Venezuela at the Manhunt International 2001 pageant placing as 2nd runner-up.

The runner-up position went to Cristóbal Lander of Miranda.

== Results ==
Color key

- Declared as winner
- Ended as runner-up
- Ended as top 5/8 qualification
- Ended as one of the finalists or semifinalists
- Ended as special awards winner

Placement	Contestant	International placement
Mister Venezuela 2000	Península Goajira – Luis Nery	2nd runner-up – Manhunt International 2001
1st runner-up	Miranda – Cristóbal Lander	
2nd runner-up	Guárico – Aníbal Martignani	1st runner-up – Grasim Mr. International 2001
Top 10	Aragua – Leonardo Cáceres; Carabobo – Deive Garcés; Distrito Capital – Juan Carlos Liendo; Lara – Eduardo Medina; Sucre – Josué Villae; Táchira – Samer Senih; Zulia – Luis Tinoco	

=== International Male Model Venezuela 2001 ===
Placement	Contestant	International placement
International Male Model Venezuela 2001	Carabobo – Deive Garcés	International Male Model 2001

=== Mr. American Continent Venezuela 2000 ===
Placement	Contestant	International placement
Mr. American Continent Venezuela 2000	Cojedes – Johnny Álvarez Díaz; Portuguesa – Tony Ferreira	Semifinalist – Mr. American Continent 2000

== Contestants ==
26 contestants competed for the title.

State	Contestant	Age (Note: Ages at the time of the pageant)	Height	Hometown
Amazonas	Nicolás Invernizzi	23	1.89 m (6 ft 2 1/2 in)	
Anzoátegui	Paco Hanna	20	1.82 m (5 ft 11 1/2 in)	
Apure	Johan Hernández	23	1.85 m (6 ft 1 in)	
Aragua	Leonardo Ernesto Cáceres	21	1.92 m (6 ft 3 1/2 in)	
Barinas	Fabián Fernández	23	1.84 m (6 ft 1/2 in)	
Bolívar	Juan Carlos Uzcátegui	23	1.94 m (6 ft 4 1/2 in)	
Carabobo	Deive Arnaldo Garcés Joaquín	21	1.87 m (6 ft 1 1/2 in)	
Cojedes	Johnny Álvarez	22	1.85 m (6 ft 1 in)	
Costa Oriental	Hugo Alberto Vásquez Barvo	24	1.88 m (6 ft 2 in)	Maracaibo
Delta Amacuro	Douglas Socorro	20	1.90 m (6 ft 3 in)	
Distrito Capital	Juan Carlos Liendo Salas	22	1.88 m (6 ft 2 in)	
Falcón	Michael Latal	19	1.81 m (5 ft 11 1/2 in)	
Guárico	Aníbal Martignani Pérez	21	1.86 m (6 ft 1 in)	
Lara	Eduardo Manuel Medina Gómez	21	1.86 m (6 ft 1 in)	
Mérida	Nelson Díaz	19	1.84 m (6 ft 1/2 in)	
Miranda	Cristóbal Rafael Lander Coraspe	23	1.86 m (6 ft 1 in)	Caracas
Monagas	Luis Gregorio León	23	1.80 m (5 ft 11 in)	
Nueva Esparta	Winston Hidalgo	22	1.93 m (6 ft 4 in)	
Península Goajira	Luis Antonio Nery Gómez	22	1.92 m (6 ft 3 1/2 in)	Cabimas
Portuguesa	Tony Ferreira	25	1.86 m (6 ft 1 in)	
Sucre	Josué David Villaé	25	1.80 m (5 ft 11 in)	Cumaná
Táchira	Samer Senih Radwan	24	1.86 m (6 ft 1 in)	
Trujillo	Augusto González	21	1.86 m (6 ft 1 in)	
Vargas	Félix Carratú	25	1.90 m (6 ft 3 in)	
Yaracuy	Guillermo Banchs Ramos	25	1.88 m (6 ft 2 in)	
Zulia	Luis Humberto Tinoco Alaña	26	1.86 m (6 ft 1 in)	

Notes

- Luis Nery (Península Goajira) placed as 2nd runner-up in Manhunt International 2001 in Beijing, China.
- Aníbal Martignani (Guárico) placed as 1st runner-up in Grasim Mr. International 2001 in Udaipur, India.
- Deive Garcés (Carabobo) won the International Male Model 2001 competition in Guatemala City, Guatemala.
- Johnny Álvarez Díaz (Cojedes) and Tony Ferreira (Portuguesa) placed as semifinalists in Mr. American Continent 2000 in Oranjestad, Aruba.
- Deive Garcés (Carabobo), Hugo Vásquez (Costa Oriental), Cristóbal Lander (Miranda) and Josué Villae (Sucre) became actors. Deive Garcés (Carabobo) also became a model.
