= Leonardo Carrero =

Venezuelan model and male beauty pageant titleholder

- Born: Leonardo Carrero Contreras; 1 November 1992 (age 33); El Vigía, Mérida, Venezuela
- Occupations: Model; Bachelor in Advertising and Marketing; Social Communications student
- Height: 1.91 m (6 ft 3 in)
- Beauty pageant titleholder
- Title: Mister Handsome Venezuela 2017; Mister Supranational Venezuela 2019
- Hair color: Black
- Eye color: Brown
- Major competitions: Mister Handsome Venezuela 2017 (Winner); Mister Venezuela 2019 (1st Runner-Up); Mister Supranational 2019 (4th Runner-Up)

Leonardo Carrero Contreras (born 1 November 1992) is a Venezuelan model and male beauty pageant titleholder. He was Mister Supranational Venezuela 2019 and represented Venezuela in the Mister Supranational 2019 where he finished as 4th Runner-Up.

== Life and career ==
=== Early life ===
Carrero was born in El Vigía, Mérida, Venezuela. He obtained a degree in advertising and marketing and is a student of social communication. He is also a physical trainer.

=== Pageantry ===
==== Mister Handsome Venezuela 2017 ====
Carrero's first foray into beauty pageants was when he participated in the Mister Handsome Venezuela, where he represented the state of Trujillo. On July 15, 2017 he won the Mister Handsome Los Andes 2017 competition, representing the Alberto Adriani municipality.

The final night of Mister Handsome Venezuela 2017 was held on December 22, 2017 at the Caracas Club Theater. Previous titleholder Eugenio Díaz presented the scarf and trophy to Carrero as the new Mister Handsome Venezuela.

==== Mister Venezuela 2019 ====
Subsequently, Leonardo would participate in the Mister Venezuela 2019 edition, held on April 13, 2019 at the Venevisión studios in Caracas. In that edition the candidates were assigned numbers instead of state bands, Carrero was assigned # 13, competing in said edition and finishing as the first runner-up, the winner being Jorge Eduardo Núñez.

==== Mister Supranational Venezuela 2019 ====
On August 22, 2019, the president of the newly created men's contest, Mister Supranational Venezuela, Prince Julio César, designates Leonardo as Mister Supranational Venezuela, this decision was made in conjunction with the realization of the first edition of Miss Supranational Venezuela.

Being designated as Mister Supranational Venezuela, Carrero became the Venezuelan representative to Mister Supranational 2019.

==== Mister Supranational 2019 ====
Carrero represented Venezuela at the Mister Supranational 2019 pageant held on December 9, 2019 in the Katowice International Congress Center, in Katowice, Poland. Carrero ended as the 4th Runner-Up, the highest place since the winning of Gabriel Correa in 2017.

Awards and achievements
| Preceded by (Netherlands) Ennio Fafieanie | Mister Supranational; 4th Runner-Up; 2019 | Succeeded by (Spain) Lucas Muñóz-Alonso |
| Preceded by (Venezuela) Jeudiel Condado | Mister Supranational Venezuela; 2019 | Succeeded by (Venezuela) William Badell |
| Preceded by Luis Marrero (Aragua) | Mister Venezuela; 1st Runner-Up; 2019 | Succeeded by Incumbent |
| Preceded by Eugenio Díaz | Mister Handsome Venezuela; 2017 | Succeeded by Alejandro Viloria |
