= Mister Venezuela 2001 =

6th Mister Venezuela pageant

- Date: November 6, 2001
- Presenters: Viviana Gibelli
- Entertainment: Gaby Espino; Mimí Lazo, Milena Santander, Nohely Arteaga; Lorca; Yaire
- Venue: Estudio 1 de Venevisión, Caracas, Venezuela
- Broadcaster: International: Univisión; Venevisión Continental; DirecTV; Official broadcaster: Venevisión
- Entrants: 25
- Placements: 10
- Winner: Daniel Navarrete; Vargas
- Photogenic: Enrique Cuevas (Carabobo)
- Best Body: Luis Nessy (Yaracuy)
- Etiquette: David Yañes (Portuguesa)

Mister Venezuela 2001 was the sixth Mister Venezuela pageant. It was held at the Estudio 1 de Venevisión in Caracas, Venezuela on November 6, 2001.

At the end of the event, Luis Nery of Península Goajira titled Daniel Navarrete of Vargas as Mister Venezuela 2001. He represented Venezuela at the Manhunt International 2002 pageant placing as 4th runner-up.

The runner-up position went to Enrique Cuevas of Carabobo.

== Pageant ==
=== Selection committee ===
The judges for Mister Venezuela include:

- Alejandra Zaidman – Lony Swimwear executive
- Sofi Hardy – President of Evita Peroni accessories
- Socorro de Viturro – Manuel Viturro de la Torre's wife, Spanish ambassador in Venezuela
- Martha de Riva – Surgeon
- Patricia Paine de Cohen – Director of Venezuelan Designers Association
- Sonia Roffé – Miss Venezuela Organization dermatologist
- Maruja Beracasa – President of the Venezuelan Antique Dealers Association
- Luisa Lucchi – President of Lucchi footwear
- María Antonieta Cámpoli – Miss Venezuela 1972, 2nd runner-up in Miss Universe 1972
- Gabriela Vergara – Actress, model, 3rd runner-up in Miss Venezuela 1996, Reina Hispanoamericana 1996
- Kiara – Singer
- Chiquinquirá Delgado – Actress, TV host, Miss Flower Queen Venezuela 1990, 1st runner-up in Miss Flower Queen International 1990
- Ana Karina Manco – Actress
- Cynthia Lander – Miss Venezuela 2001, 4th runner-up in Miss Universe 2002
- Gira de Nogueira – Ruy Nogueira's wife, Brazilian ambassador in Venezuela

== Results ==
Color key

- Declared as winner
- Ended as runner-up
- Ended as top 5/8 qualification
- Ended as one of the finalists or semifinalists
- Ended as special awards winner

Placement	Contestant	International placement
Mister Venezuela 2001	Vargas – Daniel Navarrete	4th runner-up – Manhunt International 2002
1st runner-up	Carabobo – Enrique Cuevas	Mister Intercontinental 2002
2nd runner-up	Delta Amacuro – César Suárez	2nd runner-up – Mister Intercontinental 2001

=== Mr. Grasim International Venezuela 2002 ===
Placement	Contestant	International placement
Mr. Grasim International Venezuela 2002	Cojedes – Julio Cabrera	1st runner-up – Grasim Mr. International 2002

=== Modelo Revelación Internacional Venezuela 2002 ===
Placement	Contestant	International placement
Modelo Revelación Internacional Venezuela 2002	Amazonas – Franconero Silva	1st runner-up – Modelo Revelación Internacional 2002

=== Special awards ===
Award	Contestant
Best Body	Yaracuy – Luis Nessy
Mister Etiquette	Portuguesa – David Yañes
Mister Photogenic	Carabobo – Enrique Cuevas
Mister Popularity	Guárico – Jesús García

== Contestants ==
25 contestants competed for the title.

State	Contestant	Age (Note: Ages at the time of the pageant)	Height	Hometown
Amazonas	Jean Franconero Silva	22	1.80 m (5 ft 11 in)	
Anzoátegui	Víctor Baldonedo	21	1.89 m (6 ft 2 1/2 in)	
Apure	Juan Carlos Hernández	23	1.93 m (6 ft 4 in)	
Aragua	Ángel Nazco	22	1.91 m (6 ft 3 in)	
Bolívar	Bernardo Álvarez	25	1.91 m (6 ft 3 in)	
Carabobo	Enrique Antonio Cuevas Agüero	24	1.93 m (6 ft 4 in)	
Cojedes	Julio César Cabrera Mendieta	20	1.86 m (6 ft 1 in)	
Costa Oriental	Luis Ángel Bracho	20	1.92 m (6 ft 3 1/2 in)	
Delta Amacuro	César Augusto Suárez Marcano	23	1.94 m (6 ft 4 1/2 in)	Caracas
Distrito Capital	Emanuel Romero	22	1.85 m (6 ft 1 in)	
Falcón	Alexander Matos	22	1.82 m (5 ft 11 1/2 in)	
Guárico	Jesús Alberto García	25	1.80 m (5 ft 11 in)	
Lara	Jesús Rafael Lozada	23	1.88 m (6 ft 2 in)	
Mérida	Eduardo Sández	24	1.89 m (6 ft 2 1/2 in)	
Miranda	Ricardo Escoté	22	1.86 m (6 ft 1 in)	
Monagas	Christopher Rodríguez	21	1.84 m (6 ft 1/2 in)	
Nueva Esparta	Fernando Alió	21	1.94 m (6 ft 4 1/2 in)	
Península Goajira	Andrés Maslowski	20	1.85 m (6 ft 1 in)	
Portuguesa	David Yañes	21	1.93 m (6 ft 4 in)	
Sucre	Blas Limongi	25	1.82 m (5 ft 11 1/2 in)	
Táchira	Jean Carlos Delgado	23	1.88 m (6 ft 2 in)	
Trujillo	José Márquez	24	1.89 m (6 ft 2 1/2 in)	
Vargas	Daniel Navarrete	24	1.89 m (6 ft 2 1/2 in)	Caracas
Yaracuy	Luis Manuel Nessy	23	1.90 m (6 ft 3 in)	
Zulia	Luis Guillermo Portillo	20	1.86 m (6 ft 1 in)	

Notes

- Daniel Navarrete (Vargas) placed as 4th runner-up in Manhunt International 2002 in Shanghai, China.
- Enrique Cuevas (Carabobo) won the Mister Intercontinental 2002 title in Radebeul, Germany.
- César Suárez (Delta Amacuro) placed as 2nd runner-up in Mister Intercontinental 2001 in Celle, Germany and later became a model and actor.
- Julio Cabrera (Cojedes) placed as 1st runner-up in Grasim Mr. International 2002 in New Delhi, India.
- Franconero Silva (Amazonas) placed as 1st runner-up in the Modelo Revelación Internacional 2002 competition.
- Juan Marcos Osorio (Barinas), 25, 1.86 m (6 ft 1 in) withdrew from the competition.
- Luis Felipe Lozano (Carabobo) and Manuel Rodríguez (Mérida) were replaced by Enrique Cuevas and Eduardo Sández, respectively.
