= Mister International =

Mister International could refer to:

- Mister International (Thailand), international pageant based in Thailand
- Mister International (Philippines), international male beauty pageant based in the Philippines

== Edition ==
- Mister International 2014, ninth edition of Mister International pageant
- Mister International 2022, last undisputed edition
- Mister International 2023 (Thailand), Thailand based 2023 edition
- Mister International 2023 (Philippines), Philippines based 2023 edition
- Mister International 2024 (Thailand), Thailand based 2024 edition
- Mister International 2024 (Philippines), Philippines based 2024 edition
- Mister International 2025, Thailand based edition

== Others ==
- Mister International Korea, national pageant in Korea
- Mister International Philippines 2022, innagural edition of Mister International Philippines
- Mister International Philippines 2023, second edition of Mister International Philippines competition
- Mister International Philippines 2024, third edition of Mister International Philippines
