= Mister International Philippines 2023 =

Male Beauty Pageant Edition

- Date: 28 June 2023
- Entertainment: JM Bales
- Theme: Warriors
- Venue: Newport Performing Arts Theater, Resorts World Manila, Pasay, Metro Manila, Philippines
- Entrants: 55
- Placements: 30
- Withdrawals: Lipa City; Misamis Occidental
- Winner: Austin Cabataña; Quezon City
- Congeniality: Wencel Mark Acosta; Rizal
- Best National Costume: Rizmel Cabigao; Laguna
- Photogenic: John Eric Hernandez; Candaba, Pampanga

Mister International Philippines 2023 was the second edition of Mister International Philippines held on June 28, 2023, at the Newport Performing Arts Theater, Resorts World Manila in Pasay, Metro Manila, Philippines.

At the end of the event, Mister International Philippines 2022, Myron Jude Ordillano crowned his successor Austin Cabataña of Quezon City as Mister International Philippines 2023. Other titles was announced during the coronation night.

== Background ==
From this edition, Mister International Philippines pageant will be accepting married men and father applicants who meet the eligibility requirements of the pageant.

=== Selection of Participants ===
43 out of 55 contestants were introduced to the media members during their press presentation held at the One Esplanade on April 21, 2023. These young men come from different parts of the country – Northern and Central Luzon, Southern Tagalog, Bicol Region, Visayas, Mindanao and the National Capital Region – including representatives from Filipino-Communities overseas. This edition, the contestants will undergo a series of activities and workshops that will strengthen their skills and abilities such as grooming, professional imaging, personality development, Q&A, financial literacy and leadership excellency. The pageant will have a provincial tour were segments of the competition will be hosted including Preliminary Competition.

== Results ==
Color keys

- The contestant won in an International pageant.
- The contestant was a Finalist/Runner-up in an International pageant.
- The contestant was a Semi-Finalist in an International pageant.
- The contestant did not place.

Placement	Contestant	International Placements	Ref
Mister International Philippines 2023	Quezon City; Austin Cabataña	1st Runner-Up; Mister International 2023 (PH-Based)	
Mister Earth International Philippines 2023	Cebu City; Nathaniel Tiu	Winner; Mister Earth International 2024	
Mister National Universe Philippines 2023	Batangas City; Ruslan Kulikov	Top 10; Mister National Universe 2024	
Mister National Universe Philippines 2023	Cavite City; Kenneth Aniban	Unplaced; Mister National Universe 2024	
Mister Charm Philippines 2023	Cagayan Province; Ryan Cruz	TBD; Mister Charm 2024	
Mister Globe Philippines 2023	Pasig City; Gabriel Ira Bautista	TBD; Mister Globe 2024	
Mister Beauté Internationale Philippines 2023	Oriental Mindoro; Shawn Khrysler Sulit	TBD; Mister Beauté Internationale 2024	
Mister Tourism International Philippines 2023	Taguig City; Lhenard Cardozo	TBD; Mister Tourism International 2024	
Mister Teen International Philippines 2023	Lubao, Pampanga; Phil Andrei Tungul	Winner; Mister Teen Global International 2024	
Runners-Up	Talisay, Batangas; Ryan Kristopher Sacopon	Winner; Mister Culture International 2024	
Runners-Up	Nueva Ecija; Daeniel John Felismino		
Runners-Up	Cubao, Quezon City; Austin Carl Alibuyog		
Runners-Up	Shaw Boulevard, Mandaluyong; Ivann Renz Enriquez		
Top 18	Isabela - Hassan Marjan; Laguna - Rizmel Cabigao; Macabebe, Pampanga - Charles Jordan Bondoc; Marikina City - Mathew Sygal So; Tarlac Province - RJ Devera		
Top 26	Balete, Batangas - Ivan Mendoza Las; Cagayan de Oro City - Alan Roy Sambaan II; Cainta - Aaron Maniego; Fil-Com of Ras Al-Khaimah - Jhamil Tyrone Principe; Ilocos Sur - Shadi Khalil; Misamis Oriental - Arjun Albutra; Subic, Zambales - Aljay Dado; Urdaneta City - Ace Briones		
Top 30	Albay - Micko Boñon; Fil-Com of Dubai - Guillermo Cabanlit Jr.; Las Piñas City - Anthony Meneses; Manila - Jestoni Matic		

=== Regional titleholders ===
The award was presented to representatives who placed among the finalists in the Top 25 but have not won the Mister International Philippines title.

Region	Contestant
Luzon	Batangas City – Ruslan Kulikov
Metro Manila	Marikina City – Mathew Sygal So
Visayas	Cebu City – Nathaniel Tiu
Mindanao	Cagayan De Oro City – Alan Roy Sambaan II

== Contestants ==
55 contestants competed for the crowns at stake.

City/Province	Contestants	Age (Note: Ages at the time of pageant)
Albay	Micko Boñon	22
Asingan, Pangasinan	Rillan Aguilana	25
Baguio City	Nikki Mori Escoto	20
Balete, Batangas	Ivan Mendoza Las	21
Bantayan Island	Ashley Judd Reyes	20
Bataan	Gerald Mallari	24
Batangas City	Ruslan Kulikov	23
Bulacan	Marlon Anthony Germedia	21
Cagayan de Oro City	Alan Roy Sambaan II	20
Cagayan Province	Ryan Cruz	27
Cainta	Aaron Maniego	20
Calaca City	Red Baciles	19
Candaba, Pampanga	John Eric Hernandez	21
Cavite City	Kenneth Aniban	22
Cebu City	Nathaniel Tiu	28
Cubao, Quezon City	Austin Carl Alibuyog	25
Fil-Com of Dubai	Guillermo Cabanlit Jr.	30
Fil-Com of Ras Al-Khaimah	Jhamil Tyrone Principe	26
Fil-Com of Sharjah	Mark Bustrillo	26
Ilocos Sur	Shadi Khalil	18
Isabela	Hassan Marjan	24
Laguna	Rizmel Cabigao	21
Lapu-Lapu City	John Nelson Duallo	20
Las Piñas City	Anthony Meneses	25
Lubao, Pampanga	Phil Andrei Tungul	19
Macabebe, Pampanga	Charles Jordan Bondoc	23
Mandaluyong	Ivann Renz Enriquez	28
Mandaue City	Michael Jhaye Jordan	21
Manila	Jestoni Matic	25
Marikina City	Mathew So	19
Masbate	Samuel James Atrasado	22
Misamis Oriental	Arjun Albutra	23
Nueva Ecija	Daeniel John Felismino	22
Olongapo City	Micahelle Joy Dumalaon	25
Oriental Mindoro	Shawn Khrysler Sulit	21
Palawan	Jay Mark Omolon	23
Pangasinan Province	John Michael Polondaya	21
Parañaque City	Benjamin Cruz	29
Pasig City	Gabriel Ira Bautista	22
Pozzorubio, Pangasinan	Michael John Aquino	20
Quezon City	Austin Cabanata	23
Quezon Province	Reynard Bernisca	18
Rizal Province	Wencel Mark Acosta	20
Santa Mesa, Manila	Ralph Lawrence Regala	22
Santa Rosa City	Reysther Tortoles	18
South Cotabato	Shone-Lee Avila	24
Subic, Zambales	Aljay Dado	19
Taguig City	Lhenard Cardozo	24
Talisay, Batangas	Ryan Kristopher Sacopon	22
Tanauan City	Emmanuel Balba	23
Tarlac Province	RJ Devera	23
Urdaneta City	Ace Briones	21
Zambales	Michael Allan Fortes	31
Zamboanga del Sur	Aries Ronie Patis	23
Zamboanga Peninsula	Lover Boy Dag-Uman	29
