= Mister International Philippines 2022 =

- Date: June 27, 2022
- Presenters: Michael Bristol; Kylie Verzosa
- Entertainment: LITZ; JM Bales; Nocturnal Dance Company
- Venue: Okada Manila, Parañaque, Metro Manila
- Entrants: 33
- Placements: 20
- Winner: Myron Jude Ordillano; Parañaque City
- Congeniality: Jherald Castañeda; Mandaluyong City
- Photogenic: Godfrey Nikolai Murillo; Macabebe, Pampanga

Mister International Philippines 2022 was the inaugural edition of Mister International Philippines held on June 27, 2022, at the Grand Ballroom of Okada Manila in Parañaque, Metro Manila, Philippines.

At the end of the event, Myron Jude Ordillano of Parañaque City was crowned as Mister International Philippines 2022. He will represent the country in Mister International 2022 which be held in Manila in October.

On September 8, the MIPH Organization announced and officially conferred national titles to the pageant's runners-up and a finalist during its sashing ceremony at the Novotel Manila Araneta City in Quezon City.

== Results ==
Color keys

- The contestant won in an International pageant.
- The contestant was a Finalist/Runner-up in an International pageant.
- The contestant was a Semi-Finalist in an International pageant.
- The contestant did not place.

Placement	Contestant	International Placements	Ref
Mister International Philippines 2022	Parañaque City; Myron Jude Ordillano	4th Runner-Up; Mister International 2022	
Mister Global Philippines 2022 (1st Runner Up)	Biñan, Laguna; Mark Mardon Avendaño	Unplaced; Mister Global 2022	
Mister National Universe Philippines 2023 (2nd Runner Up)	Leyte Province; Michael Ver Comaling	Mister National Earth 2023; Mister National Universe 2023	
Mister Tourism International Philippines 2022 (3rd Runner Up)	San Juan City; Kitt Cortez	TBA; Mister Tourism International 2022	
Caballero Universal Filipinas 2022 (4th Runner Up)	Cagayan de Oro City; Andre John Cue	Top 10; Caballero Universal 2022	
Top 10	Cebu City; John Ernest Tanting; Appointed	Winner; Mister Beauté Internationale 2022	
Top 10	Davao City - Mico Angelo Teng; Imus, Cavite - Kristzan Karlo Delos Santos; Macabebe, Pampanga - Godfrey Nikolai Murillo; Quezon Province - Hisam Jehad Hit		
Top 20	Albay - Jay Cordovales; Cagayan Valley - John Angelo Escuadro; Camarines Sur - Aldrian Basilia; Cebu Province - Venjie James Trozo; Iloilo Province - Christian Villarin; Nueva Ecija - Ivan Myles Sibay; Pampanga - Jomarl Pabalan; San Simon, Pampanga - Nelson Nazal; Santa Maria, Bulacan - Harold John Tiongson; Tayabas, Quezon Province - Emanuel Miguel Nadera		

== Contestants ==
33 official contestants to competed for the title.

City/Province	Contestants	Age (Note: Ages at the time of pageant)
Albay	Jay Cordovales	23
Batangas	Michael Jhun Andrew Lucas	20
Biñan, Laguna	Mark Mardon Avendaño	22
Cabuyao City	Carlo Macuto	21
Cagayan de Oro City	Andre John Cue	18
Cagayan Valley	John Angelo Escuadro	23
Cainta, Rizal	Marvin Salcedo	26
Camarines Sur	Aldrian Basilia	20
Cebu City	John Ernest Tan Ting	21
Cebu Province	Venjie James Trozo	22
Davao City	Mico Angelo Teng	23
Ilocos Sur	Jethro Mendoza	22
Iloilo Province	Christian Villarin	24
Imus, Cavite	Kristzan Karlo Delos Santos	28
Leyte Province	Michael Ver Anton Comaling	20
Macabebe, Pampanga	Godfrey Nikolai Murillo	19
Mandaluyong City	Jherald Castañeda	21
Marilao, Bulacan	Bruce Frederick Espeso	21
Misamis Occidental	Richard Bravo Jr	23
Naga City	Gerald John Fullante	28
Nueva Ecija	Ivan Myles Sibay	20
Pampanga	Jomarl Pabalan	22
Parañaque City	Myron Jude Ordillano	23
Quezon Province	Hisam Jehad Hit	25
San Juan City	Kitt Cortez	21
San Pedro, Laguna	Rafael Anciano	19
San Simon, Pampanga	Nelson Nazal	27
Santa Maria, Bulacan	Harold John Tiongson	20
Santa Rosa City	Kent Magno	23
Siniloan, Laguna	Christian Angelo Aduana	19
Tabaco City	Peter Philip Ombay	22
Tayabas, Quezon Province	Emanuel Miguel Nadera	24
Zambales	Carl Joseph Abueg	23
