= Mister International (Philippines) =

International male beauty contest based in the Philippines

- Type: International male beauty pageant
- Parent organization: Mister International Organization
- Headquarters: Manila, Philippines
- First edition: 2006
- Most recent edition: 2024
- Current titleholder: Francisco Zafra; Spain
- Founder: Alan Sim
- President: Manuel Deldio
- Honorary Vice President: Lukanand Kshetrimayum
- Language: English

Mister International is an annual international male beauty pageant and organization founded in 2006 by Singaporean Alan Sim, and run by the Mister International Organization (MIO).

Following Sim's death on October 12, 2022, two new Mister International organizations emerged in 2023, one based in the Philippines, the other in Thailand. The Mister International Organization (MIO) headquartered in the Philippines retains legal rights and uses the original logos, trademarks, and copyrights of the Mister International brand. The other one, based in Thailand, has created and used new logos, trademarks, and copyrights. Since 2023, both organizations have conducted their own competitions and chosen their own Mister International winner.

The current Mister International 2024, Francisco Zafra of Spain, was crowned on November 10, 2024, in Toledo, Cebu, Philippines. He succeeded Mister International 2023, José Calle, also from Spain, marking a back-to-back victory for his country.

== History ==
=== Background ===
The male beauty pageant was established in 2006 by Alan Sim, who died on October 12, 2022. After his death, two organizations split and began using the same title. One organization is based in the Philippines led by Manuel Deldio., the other in Thailand. The first runner-up of Mister International 2022, Lukanand Kshetrimayum from India, has been appointed as the new managing director of the Philippines-based Mister International Organization.

The Mister International Organization (MIO) headquartered in the Philippines retains legal rights and uses the original logos, trademarks, and copyrights of the Mister International brand. The other one, based in Thailand, has since created and used new logos, trademarks, and copyrights.

=== Split ===
Over time, it split into two separate organizations and events: Mister International, based in the Philippines, and another one based in Thailand, both of which are still active today. Despite being distinct competitions, the Philippines-based pageant recognizes and maintains the past winners of the original pageant. On October 20, 2023, Spain's Jose Calle won Mister International 2023 at the Cordillera Convention Center in Baguio Country Club, Baguio City, Philippines.

In the following year, Spain claimed its back-to-back victory at the 16th edition as Francisco Zafra from Spain was crowned Mister International 2024 on November 10, 2024, in Toledo City, Cebu, Philippines. He succeeded Jose Calle, Mister International 2023, also from Spain.

== Titleholders ==
Edition	Year	Date	Mister International	Runners-ups				Location	No.	Ref.
Edition	Year	Date	Mister International	First	Second	Third	Fourth	Location	No.	Ref.
1st–14th	2006–2022	Unified pageant; See Mister International (Thailand)								
15th	2023	October 20, 2023	Jose Calle; Spain	Austin Cabatana; Philippines	Tamichael Watson; Jamaica	Angel Olaya; Argentina	Abdul Rahman Lee; Malaysia	Baguio, Philippines	26	
16th	2024	November 10, 2024	Francisco Zafra; Spain	Estefano Balarin; Peru	Marvin Diamante; Philippines	Elias Silitonga; Indonesia	Zeng Xianyang; China	Toledo, Cebu	25	
17th	2025	No pageant held.								

=== Country by number of wins ===
Country	Titles	Year
Lebanon	3	2006, 2012 ~~(Note: Lebanon's Ali Hammoud (Resigned) the position.)~~, 2016
Vietnam	2	2008, 2018
Brazil	2	2007, 2011
Spain	2	2023, 2024
Dominican Republic	1	2022
South Korea	1	2017
Switzerland	1	2015
Philippines	1	2014
Venezuela	1	2013
Singapore	1	2012 (Note: Singapore's Ron Teh (Assumed) the title.)
Great Britain	1	2010
Bolivia	1	2009

== Winners gallery ==
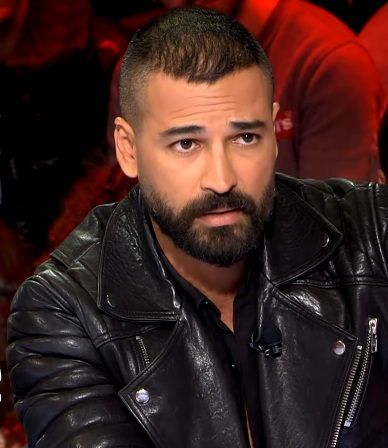
Mister International 2006
Wissam Hanna
Lebanon

Mister International 2014
Neil Perez
Philippines

== Countries/Territories ranking ==
- Only includes placement since the 2022 edition hosted by the Philippine-based MIO.

Rank	Country/Territory	Mister International	Runner-ups					Total
Rank	Country/Territory	Mister International	First	Second	Third	Fourth	Fifth	Total
1	Spain	2 (2023, 2024)	—	—	—	—	1 (2022)	3
2	Dominican Republic	1 (2022)	—	—	—	—	—	1
3	Philippines	—	1 (2023)	1 (2024)	—	1 (2022)	—	3
4	India	—	1 (2022)	—	—	—	—	1
4	Peru	—	1 (2024)	—	—	—	—	1
5	Venezuela	—	—	1 (2022)	—	—	—	1
5	Jamaica	—	—	1 (2023)	—	—	—	1
6	Hong Kong	—	—	—	1 (2022)	—	—	1
6	Argentina	—	—	—	1 (2023)	—	—	1
6	Indonesia	—	—	—	1 (2024)	—	—	1
7	Malaysia	—	—	—	—	1 (2023)	—	1
7	China	—	—	—	—	1 (2024)	—	1
Rank	Total	3	3	3	3	3	1	16

The country/territory who assumed a position is indicated in bold
The country/territory who was dethroned, resigned or originally held the position is indicated in striketrough
The country/territory who was dethroned, resigned or originally held the position but was not replaced is indicated underlined

== First Mr. International ==
The first Mr. International, organized by India-based clothing company Graviera, was a male pageant first held in 1998 and was held annually in India until 2003, when it was staged in London. It has not been held since then and has been de facto replaced by Mister International. Entries have been cross-referenced with their participation in the Manhunt International, Mister Intercontinental, and Mister World pageants.

=== Titleholders ===
Edition	Year	Date	Mr. International	Runners-up		Location	Entrants	Ref.
Edition	Year	Date	Mr. International	First	Second	Location	Entrants	Ref.
1st	1998	October 31, 1998	Mario Carballo; Costa Rica	Hasan Yalnizoglu; Turkey	Tamme Boh Tjarks; Germany	Jaipur, India	23	
2nd	1999	October 30, 1999	Nadir Nery Djiukich; Venezuela	James Ghoril; Lebanon	Abhijit Sanyal; India	New Delhi, India	24	
3rd	2000	October 13, 2000	Aryan Vaid; India	Jorge Pascual; Mexico	Xu Chong; China	Jodhpur, India	25	
4th	2001	December 15, 2001	Alexander Aquino; Philippines	Anibal Martignani Pérez; Venezuela	Leroy Vissers; Holland	Udaipur, India	36	
5th	2002	October 26, 2002	Raghu Mukherjee; India	Julio César Cabrera Mendieta; Venezuela	Odysseus Karouis; Greece	New Delhi, India	26	
6th	2003	August 24, 2003	William Kelly; Sharjah, UAE	Rajneesh Duggal; India	Shaun Paul Cuthbert; Singapore	London, England	32	

- Note: In 2003 edition, three contestants came from United Arab Emirates, included Abu Dhabi, Dubai and Sharjah. William Kelly represented Sharjah and later won the title.

=== League tables ===
Countries/Territories by number of wins
Country/Territory	Titles	Year
India	2	2000, 2002
United Arab Emirates	1	2003
Philippines	1	2001
Venezuela	1	1999
Costa Rica	1	1998

Continents by number of wins
Continent	Titles	Years
Asia	4	2000, 2001, 2002, 2003
Americas	2	1998, 1999

Map of countries/territories by number of wins

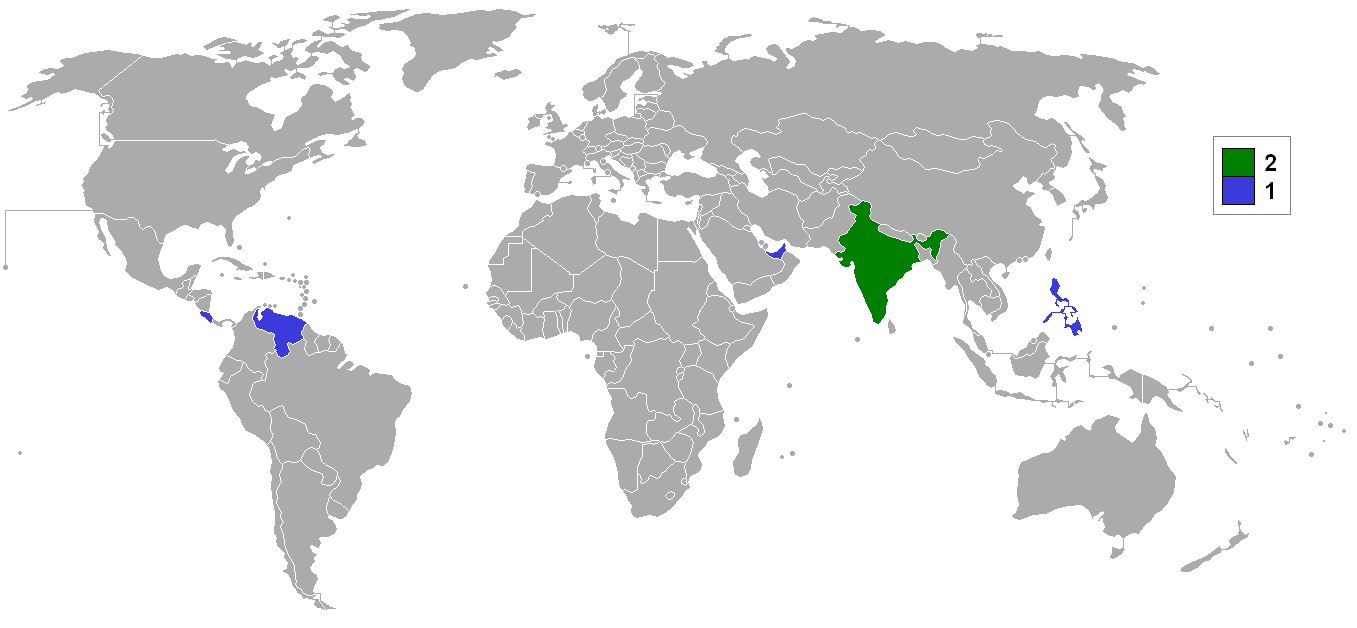
Map of countries and territories that have won Mr. International.
- Note: The winner of the 2003 edition, William Kelly, represented Sharjah, one of the emirates of the UAE. The crown is counted for the United Arab Emirates only, and not for Sharjah, since Sharjah is part of the UAE. This is reflected in the table.

=== Winners gallery ===
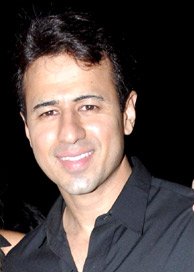
Mister International 2000
Aryan Vaid
India

== Debuts countries/territories ==
By the 2024 edition, 90 countries and territories have taken part in Mister International, but none have participated in every edition. The 2018 edition stands out as the only one without any new countries making their debut.

Edition (Year) / Country/Territory; 1st (2006) / Australia; 1st (2006) / Germany; 1st (2006) / Greece; 1st (2006) / Guatemala; 1st (2006) / India; 1st (2006) / Indonesia; 1st (2006) / Italy; 1st (2006) / Latvia; 1st (2006) / Lebanon; 1st (2006) / Malaysia; 1st (2006) / Namibia; 1st (2006) / New Zealand; 1st (2006) / Philippines; 1st (2006) / Singapore; 1st (2006) / South Africa; 1st (2006) / Sri Lanka; 1st (2006) / USA; 1st (2006) / Venezuela; 2nd (2007): 2nd (2007) / Brazil; 2nd (2007) / Canada; 2nd (2007) / Costa Rica; 2nd (2007) / Egypt; 2nd (2007) / South Korea; 2nd (2007) / Taiwan	Edition (Year) / Country/Territory; 3rd (2008): 3rd (2008) / Angola; 3rd (2008) / Belgium; 3rd (2008) / Bolivia; 3rd (2008) / China; 3rd (2008) / Croatia; 3rd (2008) / France; 3rd (2008) / Honduras; 3rd (2008) / Hong Kong; 3rd (2008) / Kyrgyzstan; 3rd (2008) / Luxembourg; 3rd (2008) / Macau; 3rd (2008) / Malta; 3rd (2008) / Netherlands; 3rd (2008) / Nigeria; 3rd (2008) / Pakistan; 3rd (2008) / Slovenia; 3rd (2008) / Vietnam; 4th (2009): 4th (2009) / Colombia; 4th (2009) / Great Britain; 4th (2009) / Ireland; 4th (2009) / Poland; 4th (2009) / Puerto Rico; 4th (2009) / Spain; 4th (2009) / Thailand	Edition (Year) / Country/Territory; 5th (2010): 5th (2010) / Austria; 5th (2010) / Azerbaijan; 5th (2010) / Bosnia & Herzegovina; 5th (2010) / Chile; 5th (2010) / Czech Republic; 5th (2010) / Denmark; 5th (2010) / Ecuador; 5th (2010) / El Salvador; 5th (2010) / Kazakhstan; 5th (2010) / Madagascar; 5th (2010) / Panama; 5th (2010) / Slovakia; 5th (2010) / Turkey; 5th (2010) / Ukraine; 6th (2011): 6th (2011) / Mexico; 6th (2011) / Norway; 6th (2011) / Portugal; 6th (2011) / Sweden; 7th (2012): 7th (2012) / Dominican Republic; 7th (2012) / Haiti; 7th (2012) / Macedonia; 7th (2012) / Serbia; 7th (2012) / The Bahamas; 8th (2013): 8th (2013) / Peru; 8th (2013) / Russia	Edition (Year) / Country/Territory; 9th (2014): 9th (2014) / Guam; 9th (2014) / Japan; 9th (2014) / Myanmar; 10th (2015): 10th (2015) / Cambodia; 10th (2015) / Georgia; 10th (2015) / Switzerland; 11th (2016): 11th (2016) / Nepal; 11th (2016) / Paraguay; 12th (2017): 12th (2017) / Finland; 12th (2017) / Nicaragua; 13th (2018) / None; 14th (2022): 14th (2022) / Albania; 14th (2022) / Cuba; 14th (2022) / Laos; 14th (2022) / Sierra Leone; 15th (2023): 15th (2023) / United Kingdom; 15th (2023) / Argentina; 15th (2023) / Ghana; 15th (2023) / Jamaica; 15th (2023) / Uzbekistan; 16th (2024): 16th (2024) / Galápagos Islands

== See also ==
- Mister World
- Mister Supranational
- Manhunt International
- Man of the World
- Mister Global
