= Nicholas of Tolentino =

Italian saint and mystic (1245–1305)

Saint Nicholas of Tolentino OSA
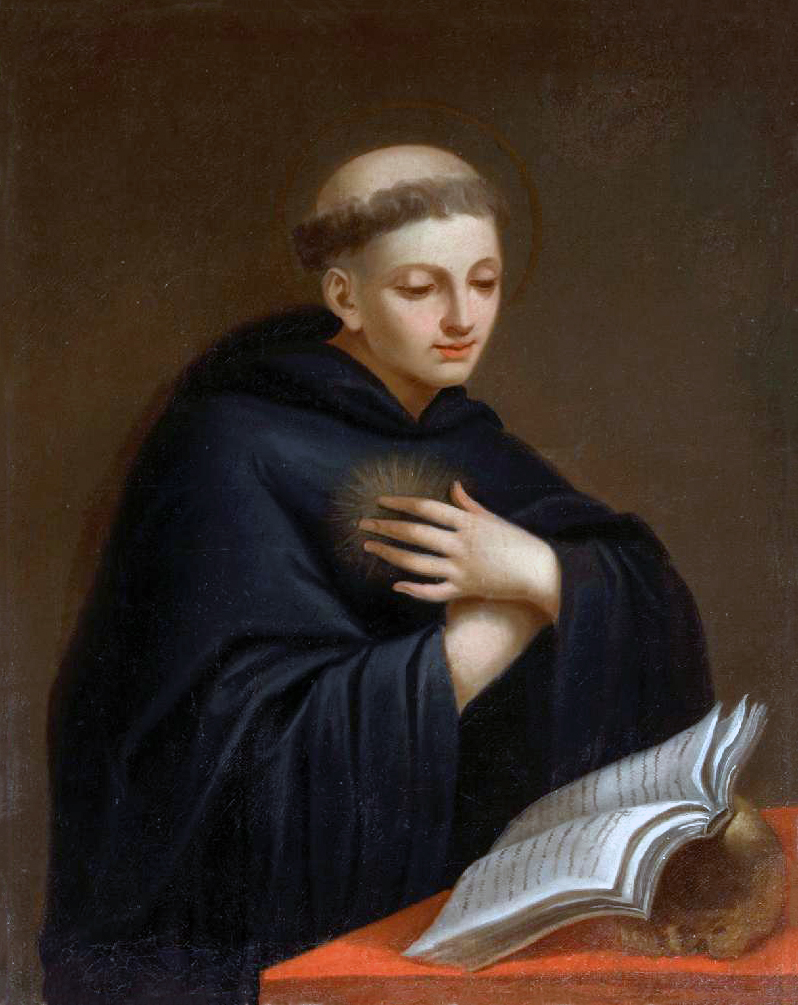
- Born: 1245; Sant'Angelo in Pontano, Italy
- Died: September 10, 1305 (aged 59–60); Tolentino, Italy
- Venerated in: Catholic Church
- Canonized: June 5, 1446, Vatican by Pope Eugene IV
- Major shrine: Basilica of Saint Nicholas of Tolentino, Tolentino, Italy
- Feast: September 10
- Attributes: bird on a plate in the right hand and a crucifix on the other hand; basket of bread; lily or a crucifix garlanded with lilies; star above him or on his breast
- Patronage: animals; babies; boatmen; dying people; mariners; holy souls; sailors; sick animals; souls in purgatory; watermen; La Aldea de San Nicolás, Spain; Barranquilla, Colombia; In the Philippines: Banton, Ajuy, Cabatuan, Guimbal, Lambunao, Capas, La Huerta, Cupang, Macabebe, Mariveles, Surigao City, Sinait, San Nicolas, Tibiao, Tobias Fornier, and the Dioceses of Cabanatuan, Mati, Surigao and Tandag.

Nicholas of Tolentino, OSA (Latin: S. Nicolaus de Tolentino, c. 1246 – September 10, 1305) known as the "Patron of Holy Souls", was an Italian Catholic mystic who is invoked as an advocate for the souls in Purgatory, especially during Lent and the month of November. He was a member of the Augustinians, whose churches today, together with those of the Discalced Augustinians, hold weekly devotions to St. Nicholas on behalf of the suffering souls. November 2, All Souls' Day, holds special significance for the devotees of St. Nicholas. He was canonized in 1446.

== Life ==
Born in 1245 in Sant'Angelo in Pontano, St. Nicholas of Tolentino took his name from St. Nicholas of Myra, at whose shrine his parents prayed to have a child. Nicholas became a friar of the Order of Hermits of Saint Augustine at 18, and seven years later, he was ordained a priest. He gained a reputation as a preacher and a confessor. C. 1274, he was sent to Tolentino, near his birthplace. The town suffered from civil strife between the Guelphs and Ghibellines, in their struggle for control of Italy. Nicholas was primarily a pastor to his flock. He ministered to the poor and criminals. He is said to have cured the sick with bread dipped in water as instructed in a dream by Mary, the Mother of God. He gained a reputation as a wonderworker. Nicholas died in 1305 after a long illness. People began immediately to petition for his canonization. Eugene IV canonized him in 1446, and his body with severed arms was discovered in 1926 at Tolentino.

A studious, kind and gentle youth, at the age of 16 Nicholas became an Augustinian novice and was a student of the Blessed Angelus de Scarpetti. A friar at the Priory of St Augustine in Recanati, the priory at Macerata and others, he was ordained in 1270 at the age of 25, and soon became known for his preaching and teachings. Nicholas, who had had visions of angels reciting "to Tolentino", in 1274 took this as a sign to move to that city, where he lived the rest of his life. Nicholas worked to counteract the decline of morality and religion which came with the development of city life in the late thirteenth century.

On account of his kind and gentle manner his superiors entrusted him with the daily feeding of the poor at the monastery gates, but at times he was so free with the friary's provisions that the procurator begged the superior to check his generosity. Once, when weak after a long fast, he received a vision of Jesus, the Blessed Virgin Mary, and Saint Augustine. He was told to eat some bread marked with a cross and dipped in water. Upon doing so he was immediately stronger. He started distributing these rolls to the ailing, while praying to Mary, often curing the sufferers; this is the origin of the Augustinian custom of blessing and distributing Saint Nicholas Bread.

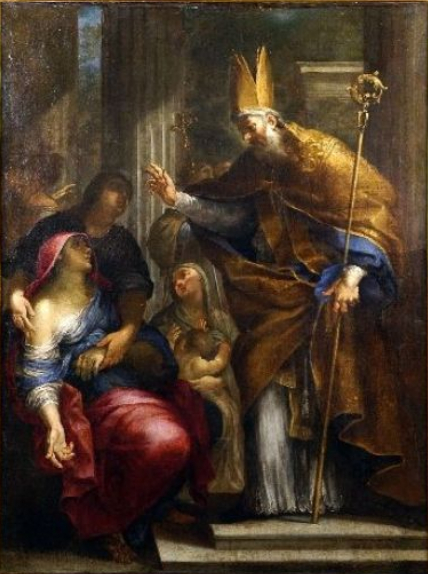
Nicholas of Tolentino by Jan van Cleve (III)

In Tolentino, Nicholas worked as a peacemaker in a city torn by strife between the Guelphs and Ghibellines who, in the conflict for control of Italy, supported the Pope and the Holy Roman Emperor respectively. He ministered to his flock, helped the poor and visited prisoners. When working wonders or healing people, he always asked those he helped to "Say nothing of this", explaining that he was just God's instrument.

During his life, Nicholas is said to have received visions, including images of Purgatory, which friends ascribed to his lengthy fasts. Prayer for the souls in Purgatory was the outstanding characteristic of his spirituality. Because of this Nicholas was proclaimed patron of the souls in Purgatory, in 1884 by Leo XIII.

Towards the end of his life he became ill, suffering greatly, but still continued the mortifications that had been part of his holy life. Nicholas died on September 10, 1305.

== Legends ==
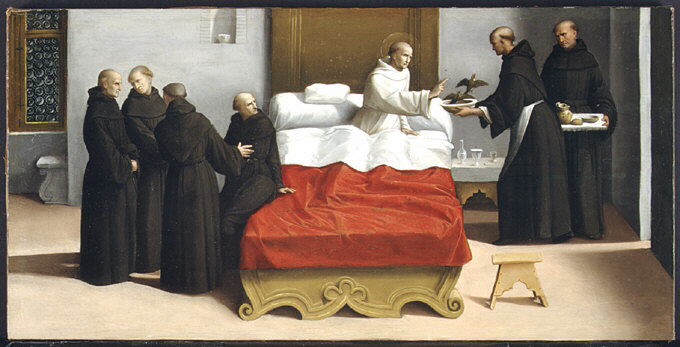
Saint Nicholas of Tolentino Reviving the Birds (1530)

There are many tales and legends which relate to Nicholas. One says the devil once beat him with a stick, which was then displayed for years in his church. In another, Nicholas, a vegetarian, was served a roasted fowl, for which he made the sign of the cross, and it flew out a window. Nine passengers on a ship going down at sea once asked Nicholas' aid, and he appeared in the sky, wearing the black Augustinian habit, radiating golden light, holding a lily in his left hand, and with his right hand, he quelled the storm. An apparition of the saint, it is said, once saved the burning palace of the Doge of Venice by throwing a piece of blessed bread on the flames. He was also reported to have resurrected over one hundred dead children, including several who had drowned together.

According to the Peruvian chronicler Antonio de la Calancha, it was St. Nicholas of Tolentino who made possible a permanent Spanish settlement in the rigorous, high-altitude climate of Potosí, Bolivia. He reported that all children born to Spanish colonists there died in childbirth or soon thereafter, until a father dedicated his unborn child to St. Nicholas of Tolentino (whose own parents, after all, had required saintly intervention to have a child). The colonist's son, born on Christmas Eve, 1598, survived to healthy adulthood, and many later parents followed the example of naming their sons Nicolás.

== Veneration ==
Nicholas was canonized by Pope Eugene IV (also an Augustinian) on June 5, 1446. He was the first Augustinian friar to be canonized. At his canonization, Nicholas was credited with three hundred miracles, including three resurrections.

The remains of St. Nicholas are preserved at the Shrine of Saint Nicholas in the Basilica di San Nicola da Tolentino in the city of Tolentino, province of Macerata in Marche, Italy.

He is particularly invoked as an advocate for the souls in Purgatory, especially during Lent and the month of November. In many Augustinian churches, there are weekly devotions to St. Nicholas on behalf of the suffering souls. November 2, All Souls' Day, holds special significance for the devotees of St. Nicholas of Tolentino.

St Pius V did not include him in the Tridentine calendar, but he was later inserted and given September 10 as his feast day. Judged to be of limited importance worldwide, his liturgical celebration was not kept in the 1969 revision of the General Roman Calendar, but he is still recognized as one of the saints of the Roman Catholic Church.

A number of churches and oratories are dedicated to him, including San Nicolò da Tolentino in Venice, San Nicola da Tolentino agli Orti Sallustiani in Rome, St. Nicholas of Tolentine in The Bronx, New York City, San Nicolás Church in Barranquilla (which served as the city's pro-cathedral church from 1932 to 1986), and St. Nicholas of Tolentino in Bristol, UK.

In Ireland, Augustinian churches and friaries historically marked his feast day with a ceremony distributing bread, sometimes with his likeness on the loaves. This practice was most strongly related to churches in County Waterford.

=== Philippines ===
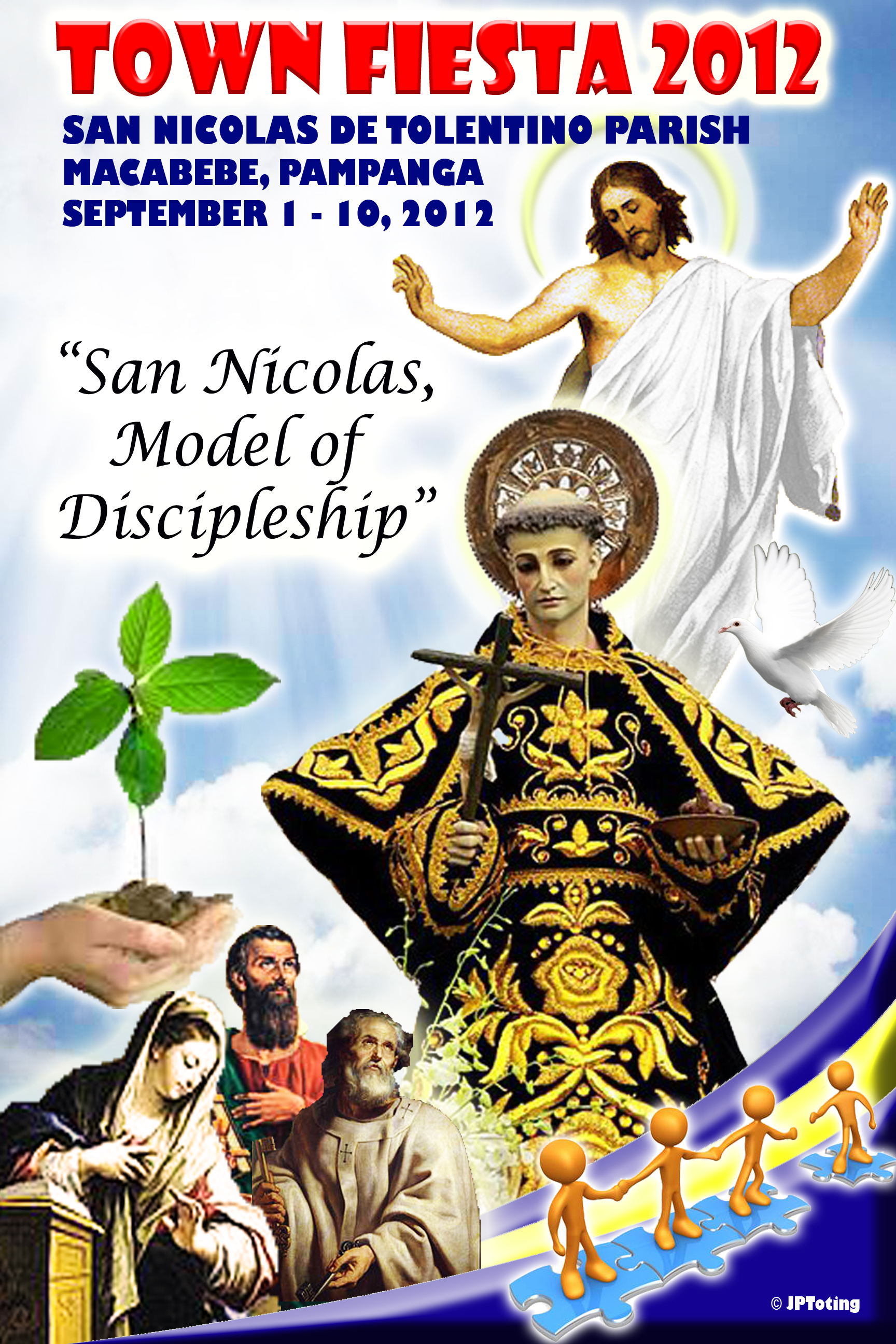
San Nicholas de Tolentino in Macabebe

In the Philippines, the 16th century Church of San Nicolas de Tolentino in Banton, Romblon, was built in honor of him and his feast day is celebrated as the annual Biniray festival, commemorating the devotion of the island's Catholic inhabitants to St. Nicholas during the Muslim raids in the 16th century.

In the province of Pampanga, a 440-year-old Augustinian church, which was founded in 1575, built in his honor is located in the heart of Macabebe, Pampanga. The façade of the church has scantly ornamentation and its architectural symmetry is lost amid and the various forms assumed the windows and the main entrance. Simple neo-classic lines of the façade. Presently, a second class relic of the saint is venerated every Tuesdays after the mass.

In the province of Nueva Ecija, St. Nicholas is being venerated as the titular of the historic Cabanatuan Cathedral where General Antonio Luna was assassinated in 1899. His first class relic is being exposed to the faithful from September 1 until September 10 every year.

In Dimiao, Bohol, the feast of San Nicolas de Tolentino, patron saint of the parish church built between 1797 and 1815, is also celebrated every September 10.

There is also the San Nicolas de Tolentino Parish Church along C. Padilla Street in Cebu City, the capital city of the province and island of Cebu. Built in 1584, the church is one of the oldest in the country. The church was also built years ahead of the establishment of the Cebu Diocese in 1595. Located some 1.5 kilometer south of the ciudad, it was called Cebu Viejo, separated from the ciudad by the Pagina creek and El Pardo. The area is also considered the original site of the landing of Miguel López de Legazpi's armada on April 17, 1565, and became the embryo of a settlement which Legaspi established. San Nicolas was a vibrant town during the Spanish Period, the spawning ground for the Revolution against Spain in 1898, and the birthplace of Cebuano musical legends of the 20th century. The town eventually merged with Cebu City on April 17, 1901.

The 16th century church in Sinait, Ilocos Sur is dedicated to Saint Nicholas of Tolentino. In May 2021, Pope Francis elevated the parish church to the status of minor basilica.

In the Iloilo province, 4 municipalities consider San Nicolas de Tolentino as their patron saint. The Augustinians erected the San Nicolas de Tolentino Church in Ajuy, Iloilo when they arrived in 1590. The San Nicolas de Tolentino Church in Cabatuan, Iloilo (built in 1834; finished in 1866) were made of red brick exterior and is considered to be a Neoclassical church. In Guimbal, Iloilo, the construction of the San Nicolas de Tolentino Church and convent began between 1769 and 1774 and it was made of coral stone and yellow sandstone. In Lambunao, Iloilo, the consecration of the San Nicolas de Tolentino Church took place on September 9, 1890.

In the Bataan province, San Nicolas de Tolentino is the patron saint of Mariveles. The Augustinian Recollects missionaries erected Mariveles Church in 1729 in honor of the saint. It was consecrated on August 10, 2022 and declared as a diocesan shrine on February 25, 2023 by the then fourth Bishop of Balanga and church's acting rector and parish priest Ruperto Santos.

=== Cultural references ===
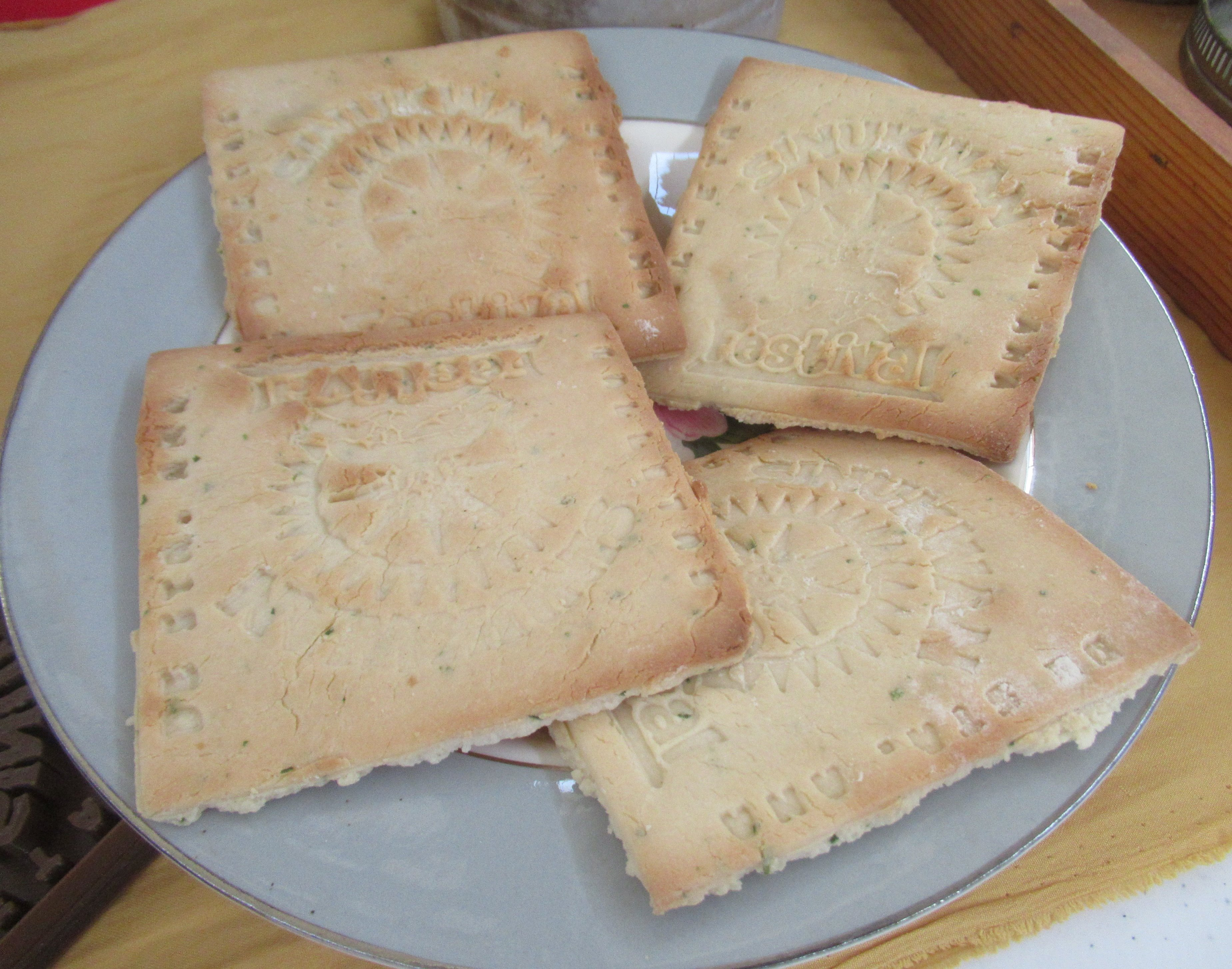
Pan de San Nicolas

San Nicholas cookie or Pan de San Nicolas is a Kapampangan cuisine delicacy originating since 1600s. It is baked in honor of Saint Nicholas (Apo Kulas), the patron saint of bakers and the Municipality of Macabebe. According to legends, the Blessed Virgin Mary healed Saint Nicholas' illness with a piece of bread. The shortbread is made of butter, egg yolk, flour and coconut milk poured in wooden molds, then baked.

== Iconography ==
He is depicted in the black habit of the Order of the Hermits of St. Augustine — a star above him or on his breast, a lily, or a crucifix garlanded with lilies, in his hand. Sometimes, instead of the lily, he holds a vial filled with money or bread.

== See also ==
- Saint Nicholas of Tolentino, patron saint archive

== Gallery ==
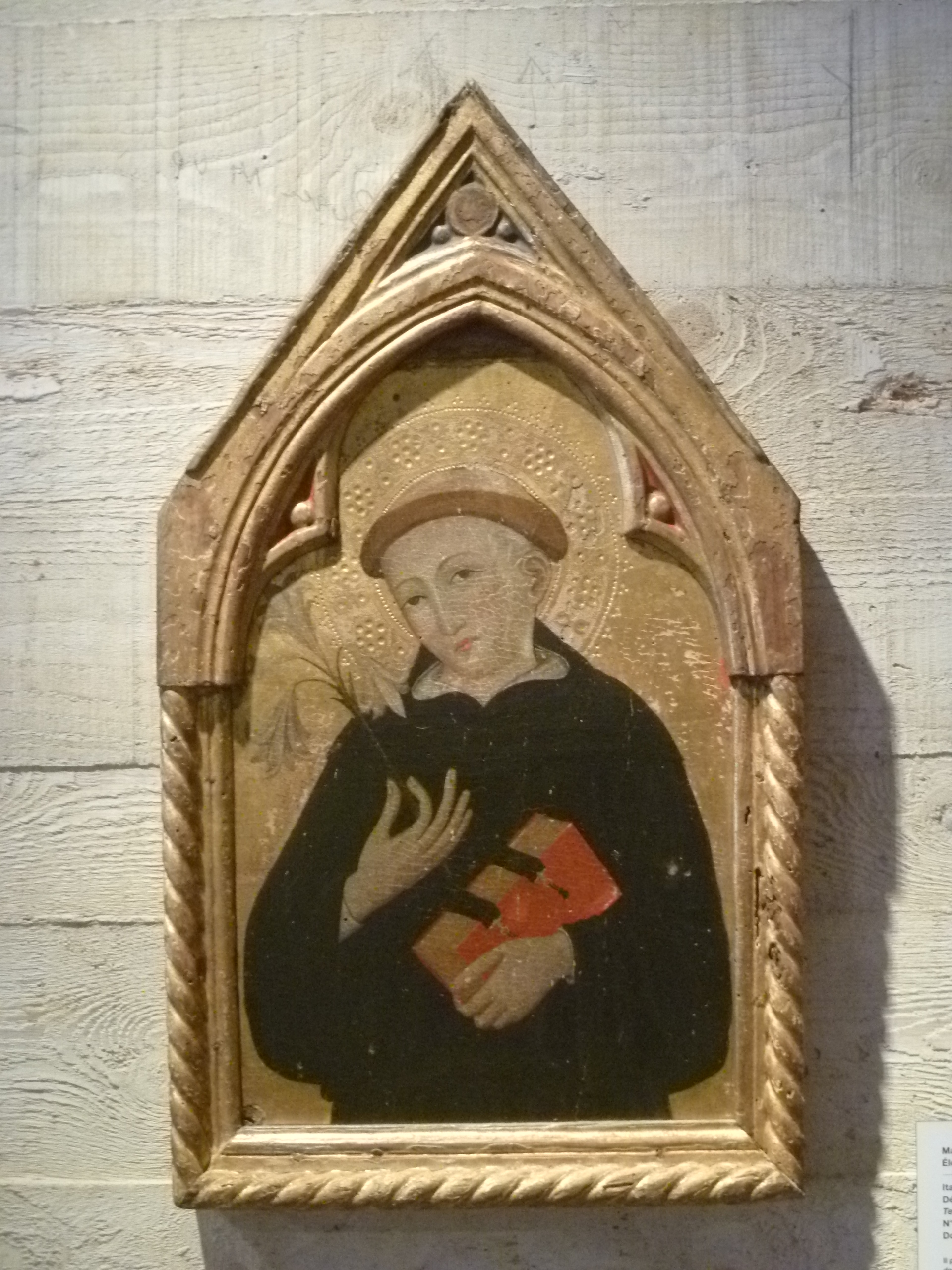
Nicholas of Tolentino by Master of Narni; early 15th century

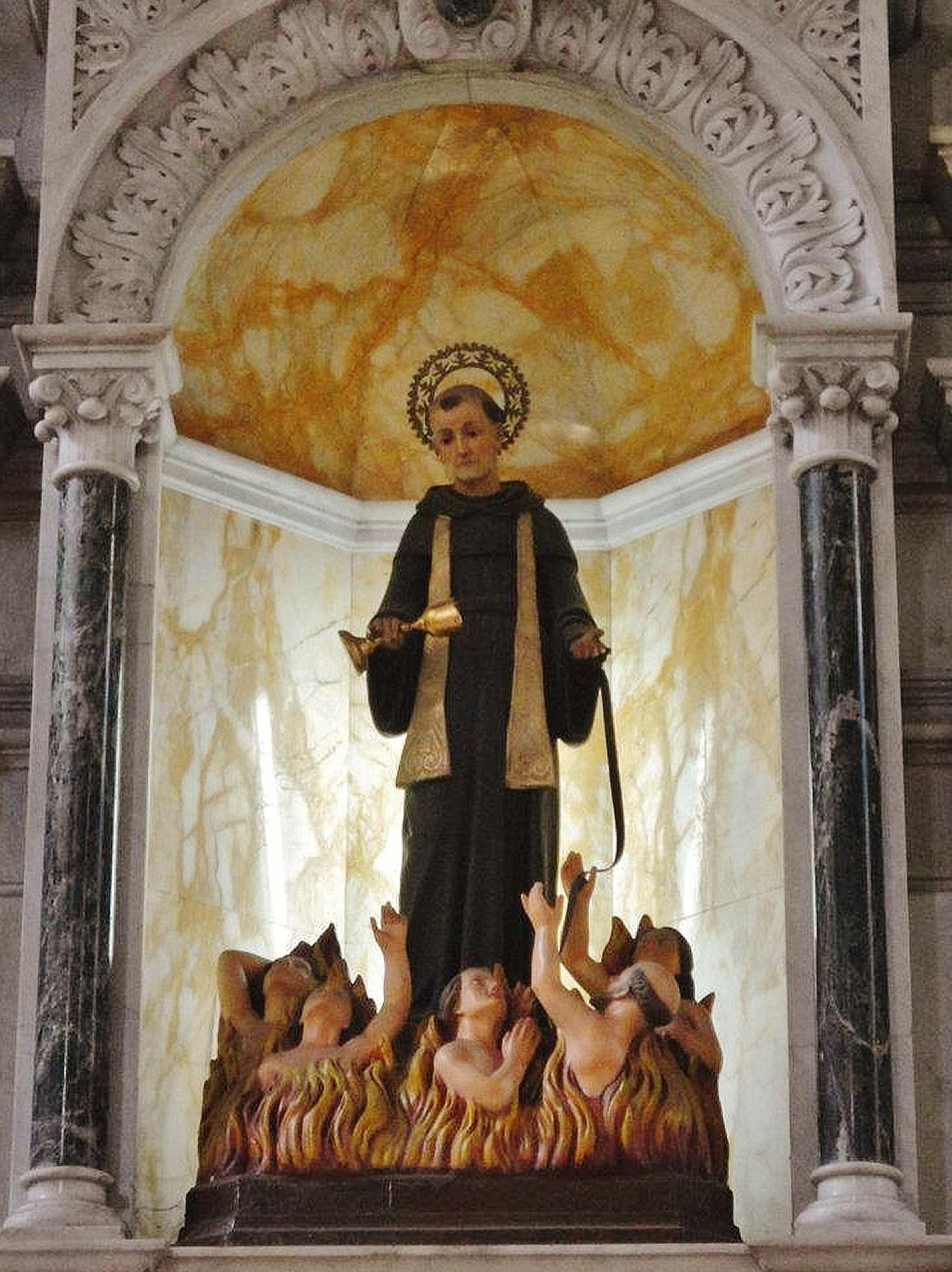
Image of St. Nicholas of Tolentino in Medellín

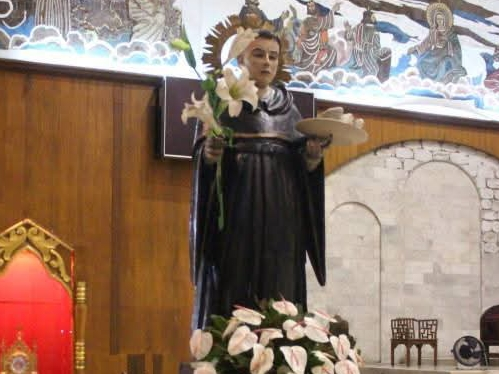
Image of St. Nicholas of Tolentino at the Archdiocesan Shrine of San Nicolas de Tolentino Parish Church, Cebu City, Philippines
