= Mister International Philippines 2024 =

- Date: 30 June 2024
- Hosts: Nathaniel Tiu; Yllana Aduana; Austin Cabatana
- Venue: FPJ Arena
- Entrants: 42
- Placements: 27
- Withdrawals: Nueva Ecija; Pampanga
- Winner: Laguna; Marvin Diamante
- Congeniality: Cebu City; Ralph Jude Dinolan
- Photogenic: Rizal Province; Erik Gudelano IV

Mister International Philippines 2024 was the third edition of the Mister International Philippines pageant held at FPJ Arena in San Jose, Batangas, on June 30, 2024.

At the end of the event, Austin Cabataña of Quezon City, Ruslan Kulikov of Batangas City, Kenneth Aniban of Cavite City, Nathaniel Tiu of Cebu City, Ryan Cruz of Cagayan Province, Gabriel Bautista of Pasig City, Lhenard Cardozo of Taguig City and Phil Andrei Tungul of Lubao, Pampanga will crown their successors. Two new titles were also given in this edition of the pageant. The winners will represent the Philippines in various male international pageants.

== Background ==
On April 28, Mister International Philippines Organization officially introduced the 50 official candidates for this edition during their press presentation held at the Midas Hotel and Casino in Pasay, Metro Manila. The candidates come from different parts of the country and the Filipino community abroad who will compete on June 28 to win one of the titles at stake and represent the country on the international stage.

=== Darling of the Press ===
Among the contestants, the media members selected their Press Favorites.

Award	Contestants			
Award	1st	2nd	3rd	4th
Darling of the Press	Erik Gudelano IV; Rizal Province	Marc Louise Sarmac; San Fernando, La Union	Ian Howell Dingal; Misamis Occidental	Ralph Lawrence Regala; Pampanga

== Results ==
Color keys

- The contestant won in an International pageant.
- The contestant was a Finalist/Runner-up in an International pageant.
- The contestant was a Semi-Finalist in an International pageant.
- The contestant did not place.

=== Placements ===
The MIPH 2024 Finals was held in San Jose, Batangas via Mister International Philippines Organization official Facebook page on June 30, 2024.

Placement	Contestant	International Placements	Ref
Mister International Philippines 2024	Laguna; Marvin Diamante§	2nd Runner-up; Mister International 2024 (PH-Based)	
Mister Earth International Philippines 2024	Rizal Province; Erik Gudelano IV	Mister Earth International 2025	
Mister National Universe Philippines 2024	Santo Tomas, Batangas; Marcus Stephen Parcon	Mister National Universe 2025	
Mister National Universe Cebu Island 2024	Cebu City; Ralph Jude Dinolan	Mister National Earth 2025; Mister National Universe 2025	
Mister Charm Philippines 2024	Bulacan; Matt Aldrick Gregorio	Mister Charm 2025	
Mister International Philippines - World 2024	Leyte; Jake Keanu Batiancela §	Pageant of the World 2024	
Mister Culture International Philippines 2024	San Fernando, La Union; Marc Louise Sarmac	Mister Culture International 2025	
Mister Runway Model Universe Philippines 2024	Zambales; Charlie Cook §	Runway Model Universe 2024	
Mister International Philippines - Tourism 2024	Tanauan City, Batangas; Brent Jonathan Mendoza	Mister Tourism International 2025	
Mister Teen International Philippines 2024	Cagayan Province; Aimree Kervick Pablo	Mister Teen Global International 2025	
1st Runner-up	Rosario, Cavite; Dannvie Remulla		
Top 16	Arayat, Pampanga Jolo Eries Babor; Initao, Misamis Oriental Rojie Fajardo; Misamis Occidental Ian Howell Dingal; Parañaque City Jade Dalogdog; Tarlac John Paul Gundayao		
Top 27	Agusan del Sur Jeffry Saro §; Batangas City Rae Lexiss Mendoza; Bauan, Batangas Andrew Lucas §; Cagayan de Oro City Ronald Costanilla; City of San Jose Del Monte Marlo Martin; Eastern Pangasinan Januel Sevilla; Fil-Com of KSA Kenzo Rheynald Quiambao §; Fil-Com of Riyadh Arjel Morallos §; La Union Jayr Naanos §; Los Baños, Laguna Jason Sardua §; Pinamungajan, Cebu George Kenny Fedrequilan		

§ – placed into the Top 27 by fast-track challenge

=== Special awards ===
Awards		Delegate
FAST-TRACK WINNERS	Mister Popularity	La Union Jayr Naanos; Fil-Com of KSA Kenzo Rheynald Quiambao; Agusan del Sur Jeffry Saro
FAST-TRACK WINNERS	People’s Choice Award	Leyte Jake Keanu Batiancela; Los Baños, Laguna Jason Sardua; Fil-Com of Riyadh Arjel Morallos
FAST-TRACK WINNERS	Best in Modern Filipino Barong	Zambales Charlie Cook
FAST-TRACK WINNERS	Top Model	Laguna Marvin Diamante
FAST-TRACK WINNERS	Multimedia	Bauan, Batangas Andrew Lucas
SPECIAL AWARDS	Best in Formal Wear	Bulacan Matt Aldrick Gregorio
SPECIAL AWARDS	Best in Swimwear	Santo Tomas, Batangas Marcus Stephen Parcon
SPECIAL AWARDS	Mister Photogenic	Rizal Province Erik Gudelano IV
SPECIAL AWARDS	Mister Congeniality	Cebu City Ralph Jude Dinolan
SPECIAL AWARDS	Mister Personality	Bohol Lloyd Vincent Calunia; Bacolod City Paolo Ocampo
SPONSORS AWARDS	Mister Dermaworld	Laguna Marvin Diamante
SPONSORS AWARDS	Face of Dermaworld	Cagayan Province Aimree Kervick Pablo
SPONSORS AWARDS	Skin of Dermaworld	Zambales Charlie Cook
SPONSORS AWARDS	Body of Dermaworld	Misamis Occidental Ian Howell Dingal
SPONSORS AWARDS	Options Philippines Ambassadors	Misamis Occidental Ian Howell Dingal; Bulacan Matt Aldrick Gregorio; Laguna Marvin Diamante; Leyte Jake Keanu Batiancela

== Contestants ==
Forty-four contestants that will represent their cities and provinces are confirmed to compete for the titles.

No.	Locality	Contestant	Age (Note: Ages at the time of the pageant)	Height
1	Arayat, Pampanga	Jolo Eries Babor	21	5' 9"
2	City of San Jose Del Monte	Marlo Martin	20	5' 9"
3	Rodriguez, Rizal	Calvin Rejie Cabatac	20	5' 10"
4	Bohol	Lloyd Vincent Calunia	24	5' 9"
5	Parañaque City	Jade Dalogdog	29	5' 9"
6	Bauan, Batangas	Andrew Lucas	22	5' 9"
7	Rosario, Cavite	Dannvie Remulla	19	5' 9"
8	La Union	Jayr Naanos	23	5' 10"
9	Santo Tomas, Batangas	Marcus Stephen Parcon	23	5' 10"
10	Eastern Pangasinan	Januel Sevilla	23	5' 10"
11	Leyte	Jake Keanu Batiancela	28	5' 11"
12	Bulacan	Matt Aldrick Gregorio	18	5' 11"
13	Rizal Province	Erik Gudelano IV	28	5' 11"
14	Camiling, Tarlac	Aziz Barakat	26	5' 11"
15	Cagayan de Oro City	Ronald Costanilla	20	5' 11"
16	Pinamungajan, Cebu	George Kenny Fedrequilan	23	5' 11"
17	Zambales	Charlie Cook	22	6' 1"
18	Noveleta, Cavite	Philip Prudente	20	6' 0"
19	Alicia, Isabela	Peter Jacob	21	6' 1"
20	Santa Rosa, Laguna	Carl Limuel Atienza	19	6' 2"
21	San Fernando, La Union	Marc Louise Sarmac	22	6' 2"
22	San Juan City	Kelvin Dave Ramos	22	6' 1"
23	Toledo City	Rod Miguel Lopez	22	6' 2"
24	Misamis Occidental	Ian Howell Dingal	21	6' 1"
25	Tarlac	John Paul Gundayao	20	6' 1"
26	Pangasinan	Christian Jay Madarang	25	5' 11"
27	Laguna	Marvin Diamante	26	5' 10"
28	Cebu City	Ralph Jude Dinolan	27	6' 0"
29	Tanauan City, Batangas	Brent Jonathan Mendoza	22	5' 10"
30	Cavite	Ghiane Angel Daniel Lova	21	5' 10"
31	Nueva Ecija	John Mark Sibayan	20	5' 11"
32	Bataan	John Kuthumi Ragel	22	5' 11"
33	Sudipen, La Union	Loreto Erno Jr.	21	5' 10"
34	Pampanga	Ralph Lawrence Regala	23	5' 10"
35	Los Baños, Laguna	Jason Sardua	24	5' 9"
36	Batangas Province	Ian Christopher Catimbang	19	5' 9"
37	Agusan del Sur	Jeffry Saro	27	5' 9"
38	Batangas City	Rae Lexiss Mendoza	22	5' 8"
39	Initao, Misamis Oriental	Rojie Fajardo	22	5' 8"
40	Bacolod City	Paolo Ocampo	28	5' 8"
41	Davao Region	David Christopher Chan	21	5' 10"
42	Fil-Com of KSA	Kenzo Rheynald Quiambao	30	5' 10"
43	Fil-Com of Riyadh	Arjel Morallos	31	5' 9"
44	Cagayan Province	Aimree Kervick Pablo	17	6' 0"
