= Michael Ver Comaling =

Filipino pentathlete (born 2000)

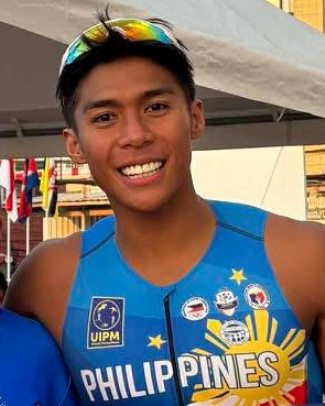
- Comaling in 2025
- Born: Michael Ver Anton Comaling; August 30, 2000 (age 26)
- Known for: Modern pentathlete, Pinoy Big Brother contestant
- Beauty pageant titleholder
- Title: Mister National Universe Philippines; Mister National Earth 2023
- Major competitions: Mister International Philippines 2022; Mister National Universe 2023
- Sports career
- Home town: Ormoc, Leyte
- Sport: Modern pentathlon
- Events: Triathle, Laser run
Medal record
Modern pentathlon
Representing Philippines
SEA Games
Gold medal – first place	2019 Philippines	Men's beach triathle
Gold medal – first place	2025 Thailand	Men's beach triathle
Bronze medal – third place	2019 Philippines	Mixed beach triathle relay

Michael Ver Anton Comaling (born August 30, 2000) is a Filipino modern pentathlete and former Pinoy Big Brother participant.

== Sports career ==
Michael Comaling is a modern pentathlete and is associated with the Philippine Modern Pentathlon Association (PMPA). He was scouted by Richard Gomez at 17-years old in Ormoc. He represented the Philippines at the 2019 SEA Games in his home country, winning a gold medal in the men's beach triathle event. He also took part at the men's laser-run individual event placing seventh.

In 2020, Comaling was excluded from the national team due to a knee injury. He was able to return after around two to three years.

He won seven gold medals at the UIPM 2023 Southeast Asia Championships in Thailand.

Comaling competed in the 2025 SEA Games in Thailand winning a gold in the men's beach triathle event.

== Entertainment career ==
After participating in the 2019 SEA Games, Comaling started his career in showbusiness by joining Pinoy Big Brother: Kumunity Season 10 as a housemate. He also appeared in The Voice Philippines.

== Beauty pageantry ==
Representing Leyte, Comaling won the second runner-up position at the Mister International Philippines 2022 He was also given the title "Mister National Universe Philippines" which qualified him for the Mister National Universe 2023 pageant in Thailand.

Comaling represented the Philippines in the pageant placing third runner-up in the Thailand pageant. He was given the title, Mister National Earth 2023.

== Personal life ==
Comaling hails from Ormoc, Leyte.
