= San Nicolas de Tolentino Church (Macabebe) =

Roman Catholic church in Pampanga, Philippines

Macabebe Church
- San Nicolas de Tolentino Parish Church
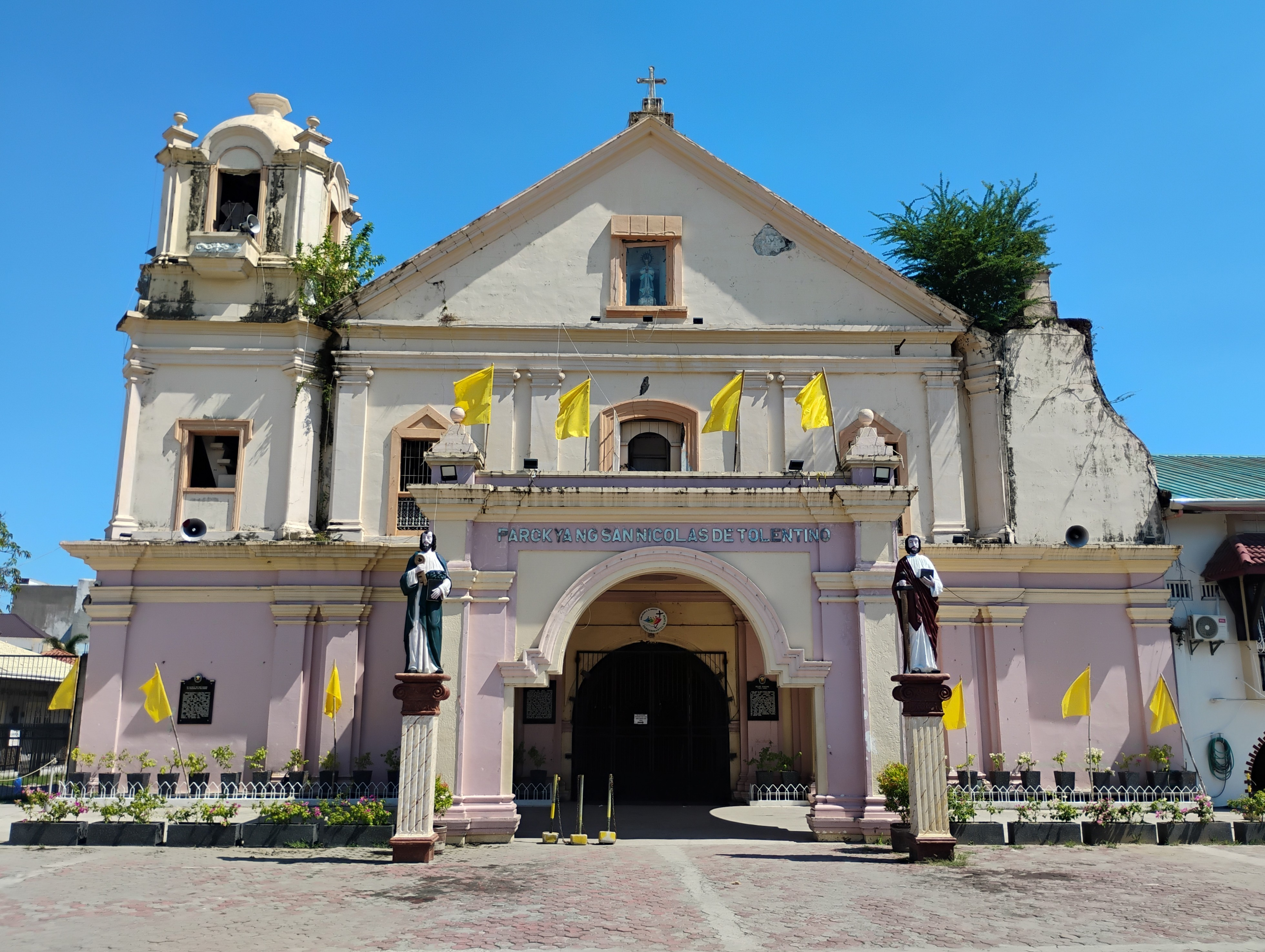
- Church facade in 2025

- Location in Luzon Location in the Philippines
- 14°54′56″N 120°43′13″E
- Location: Santa Cruz, Macabebe, Pampanga
- Country: Philippines
- Denomination: Roman Catholic

History
- Founded: 1575

Architecture
- Functional status: Active
- Architect: Fr. Felipe Tallada
- Architectural type: Church building
- Style: Baroque, Neo-classic, Barn-style Baroque
- Completed: 1864

Specifications
- Length: 82.45 metres (270.5 ft)
- Width: 21.12 metres (69.3 ft)
- Height: 10.50 metres (34.4 ft)
- Materials: Sand, gravel, cement, mortar, steel and bricks

Administration
- Archdiocese: San Fernando

Clergy
- Priest: Rev. Fr. Angeles Ariel D. Limjoco (Parish Priest) Rev. Fr. Allan Paul L. Mariano (Parochial Vicar)

San Nicolas de Tolentino Parish Church, commonly known as Macabebe Church, is a 17th-century, Baroque Roman Catholic church located at Barangay Santa Cruz, Macabebe, Pampanga, Philippines. The parish church, under the patronage of Saint Nicholas of Tolentine, is under the Archdiocese of San Fernando.

== History ==
Augustinian friars established the early Catholic community of Macabebe on September 3, 1575, as a visita or sub-parish of the nearby Parish of San Juan Bautista Calumpit. Later the same year, Father Sebastian de Molina was named chaplain of Macabebe. On September 6, 1576, the administration of the church and convent of Macabebe was transferred to San Agustin Parish of Lubao with Father Ildefonso Heredero as administrator. The first church structure, believed to have been erected between 1576 and 1583, is attributed to Father Heredero. The exact date of the construction of the present masonry church is not specified although it has been documented that Father Felipe Tallada (priest of Macabebe in 1613) reinforced the church with stronger materials. Father Tomas Gresa expanded the church in 1864. Finally, the church was completed in 1880 under the administration of Father Eleuterio Ibeas. Two major events of the late 19th-century damaged the stone-and-brick church: the earthquakes of 1880 and the Philippine Revolution of 1898 wherein the church purportedly was set on fire by the revolutionaries under the order of General Isidoro Torres in fury of the Filipino Revolutionaries for the locals' loyalty to Spain and subsequently to the Americans, destroying all records. Post war renovation works were undertaken afterwards.

== Architecture ==
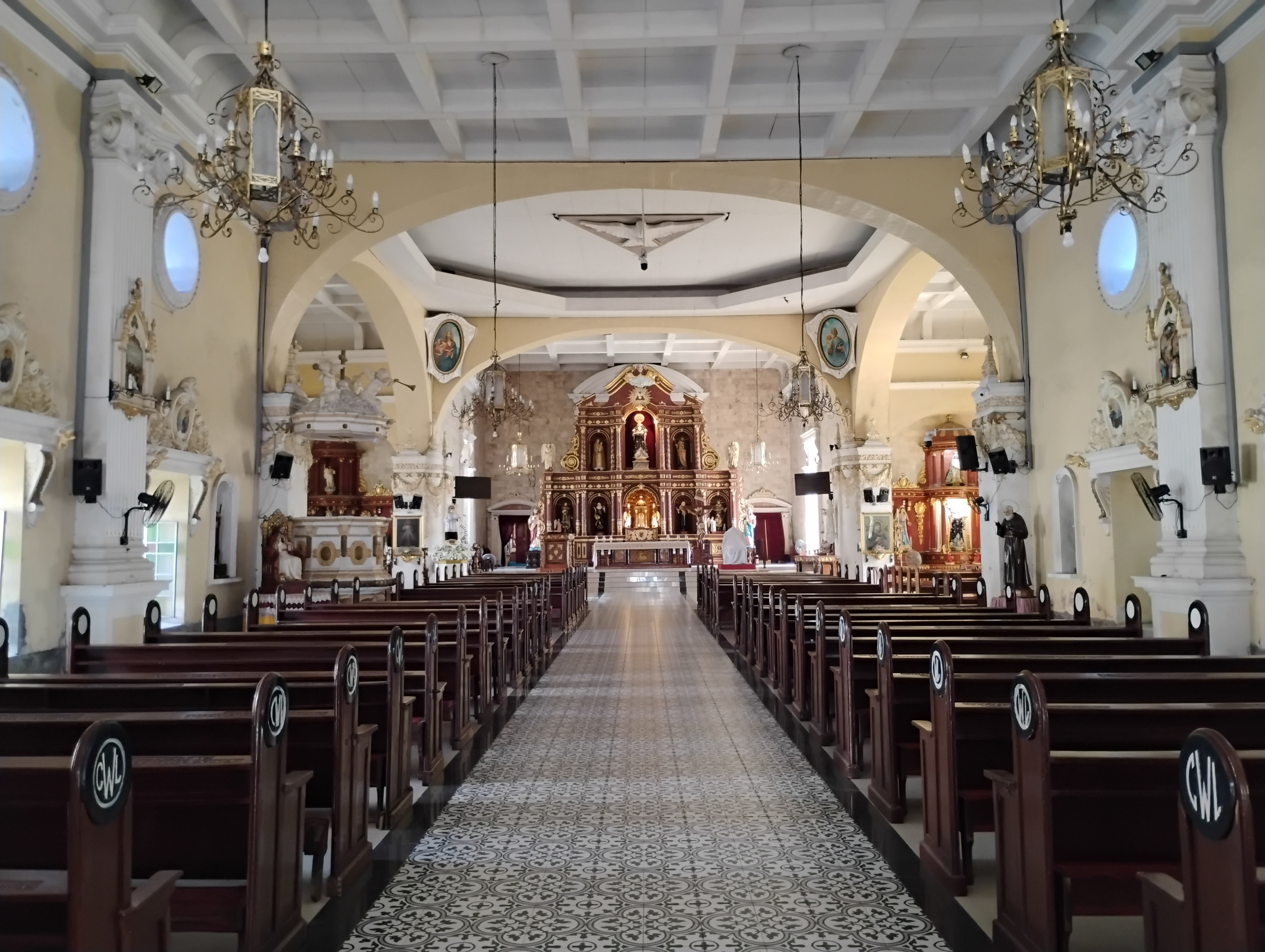
Church interior in 2025

The façade of the church is of Barn-style Baroque architecture, with predominantly Neo-classical features. It is bare of ornamentation save for coupled Ionic pilasters located on the two levels of the façade. The entire front is capped by a triangular pediment adorned by a rectangular saint's niche. The monotony of Neo-classical features is broken by the complex carvings on the topmost level of the three-tiered belfry attached to the right of the structure. Also adding to the contrast are the two large wooden images and floral designs etched on the main door. The church measures 70 metres (230 ft) long, 17 metres (56 ft) wide and 11 metres (36 ft) high. A later addition into the structure is the concrete porte-cochère.

=== New altarpiece ===
On December 12, 2009, a new, wooden altarpiece (retablo or reredos) was installed through the initiative of a Parish Construction Committee led by then-parish priest, Father Ted Valencia. A new altar and lectern was also commissioned to match the new altarpiece.
