= Modern pentathlon at the 2025 SEA Games =

- Venue: Jomtien Beach; Samae Beach, Ko Lan
- Location: Chonburi, Thailand
- Dates: 17–19 December 2025

Modern pentathlon competitions at the 2025 SEA Games took place at Jomtien Beach and Samae Beach in Bang Lamung, Chonburi, from 17 to 19 December 2025.

== Medal table ==
* Host nation (Thailand)

| Rank | Nation | Gold | Silver | Bronze | Total |
|---|---|---|---|---|---|
| 1 | Philippines | 3 | 2 | 1 | 6 |
| 2 | Thailand* | 2 | 0 | 4 | 6 |
| 3 | Indonesia | 1 | 4 | 1 | 6 |
| Totals (3 entries) | | 6 | 6 | 6 | 18 |

== Medalists ==
| Event | Gold | Silver | Bronze |
|---|---|---|---|
| Men's laser run | Melvin Sacay; Philippines | Mufti Fadhil Aulia; Indonesia | Taparak Narongdech; Thailand |
| Men's obstacle laser run | Samuel German; Philippines | Ifsan M Indonesia | Lookjun Witchapon; Thailand |
| Men's triathle | Michael Ver Comaling; Philippines | Sugianto Farras Aris; Indonesia | Yohuang Phurit; Thailand |
| Women's laser run | Pridasittinan Doiporn; Thailand | Princess Honey Arbilon; Philippines | Febrianti Vera; Indonesia |
| Women's obstacle laser run | Pridasittinan Doiporn; Thailand | Bangun Caroline Andita; Indonesia | Juliana Shane Sevilla; Philippines |
| Women's triathle | Putri Dea Salsabila; Indonesia | Shyra Mae Aranzado; Philippines | Kaewyongkod Aisika; Thailand |
