= Lukanand Kshetrimayum =

Indian actor, filmmaker and model

Lukanand
- Born: Lukanand Kshetrimayum; India
- Height: 6 ft (183 cm)
- Beauty pageant titleholder
- Title: Mister North East 2019; Mister International India 2019
- Hair color: Dark Brown
- Eye color: Brown
- Major competitions: Mister North East 2019 (Winner); Mister International 2022 (1st Runner-up)
- Website: lukanand.com

Lukanand Kshetrimayum is an Indian actor, model, filmmaker and YouTuber. He is native to Manipur, India.

He is a winner of the 10th Garnier Men Mega Mister North East 2019. He is a winner of the national title of Mister International India 2019. He won the first runner-up title at the Grand Finale of the 14th Mister International 2022 event, held in the Philippines. He is an awardee of the Mister Derma World International.

== Early life ==
Lukanand Kshetrimayum is born to Ksh Bimal and Elangbam Sujata. He is a resident of Moirangkhom Bokulmakhong, Imphal West district. He is the youngest of three brothers.

He did his schooling from Maria Montessori Senior School in Imphal.

== Career in modeling ==
Lukanand achieved the top place in the 10th Garnier Men Mega Mister North East 2019. He was given the national title of Mister International India 2019. He won the first runner-up title at the Grand Finale of the 14th Mr International 2022 event held in the Philippines. He was awarded the Mister Derma World International.

In 2023, Lukanand took part in the grand finale of the 15th Edition of Mister International pageant held at Baguio, Cordillera Hall, Baguio Country Club, Baguio, Philippines. In the event, he focused on 'Burning Manipur' and took public attention to raise awareness regarding happenings in Manipur.

== Filmography ==
Lukanand Kshetrimayum directed many films, including Asengba Saktam (Meitei: ꯑꯁꯦꯡꯕ ꯁꯛꯇꯝ, 2014), Meitan Araba (Meitei: ꯃꯩꯇꯥꯟ ꯑꯔꯥꯕꯥ, 2019), among many. He also produced three songs in 2021, namely Laibak Pheida (Meitei: ꯂꯥꯏꯕꯛ ꯐꯩꯗꯥ), Meitan Araba (Meitei: ꯃꯩꯇꯥꯟ ꯑꯔꯥꯕ) and Hanglanu (Meitei: ꯍꯪꯂꯅꯨ).
