= Mister International 2024 (Philippines) =

16th edition of Mister International (Philippines)

- Date: November 10, 2024
- Presenters: Kitt Cortez
- Venue: Toledo, Cebu, Philippines
- Broadcaster: YouTube / Facebook
- Entrants: 25
- Placements: 16
- Debuts: Galápagos Islands
- Withdrawals: Argentina; Poland; Canada; Costa Rica; Cuba; Ghana; USA; Jamaica; South Africa; Uzbekistan; Australia
- Returns: Colombia; Ecuador; Hong Kong; Peru; Puerto Rico; Sri Lanka; China; Venezuela; Italy
- Winner: Francisco Zafra; Spain

Mister International 2024 was the 16th Mister International competition, held at Toledo City Megadome Sports Center in Cebu, Philippines on November 10, 2024. Representatives from 25 nations and autonomous regions vied for the title.

This pageant was organized by the Philippine-based Mister International Organization, in parallel of the Mister International 2024 pageant in Bangkok of the Thailand-based organization, which claims to be the legitimate organizer of the pageant.

The former titleholder, Mister International 2023 José Calle from Spain, crowned his successor, Francisco Zafra—a model and policeman—as Mister International 2024. This is the first time Spain has achieved a back-to-back win and the first time it has happened in Mister International by the Philippine-based Mister International Organization history.

== Background ==
Cebu hosted this year's Mister International competition from November 3 to 10. On March 20, a meeting took place between representatives of Mister International, including its president, Manuel Deldio, and the Cebu City Tourism Commission, headed by Chief Operating Officer Dr. Neil Odchigue. Fashion designer and pageant chairman/director Lemuel Rosos also participated in the meeting.

The edition was hosted by Kitt Cortez and directed by Lemuel Rosos. The panel of judges included designer Cary Santiago and a lineup of individuals: Jennylyn de los Santos, Jinky Nagel Delos Santos, Girlie Fangki, Atty. Manuel Deldio, Jessica Suson, Rondel Omayan Paradero, Rea Wiradinata, Atty. Regal Oliva, Haydee Ledesma, Dr. Charlie Mendez, Wilma Laude Zamora, Austin Cabatana, and Teejay Marquez.

== Results ==
This is the results list where Francisco Zafra from Spain won the title on November 10 in Toledo, Cebu, Philippines.

Winner

Placement	Contestant	Ref.
Mister International 2024	Spain – Francisco Zafra	
1st Runner-Up	Peru – Estefano Balarin	
2nd Runner-Up	Philippines – Marvin Diamante	
3rd Runner-Up	Indonesia – Elias Silitonga	
4th Runner-Up	China – Zeng Xianyang	
Top 10	Colombia – Nelson Ruiz; Ecuador – Mario Fernando Perez Rivera; Japan – Akira Hatekayama; Vietnam – Mai Hieu Trung; Italy – Gabriele Calà	
Top 16	India – Adong Jamatia; Brazil – Nathanael Santos; Galápagos Islands – Flavio Romero; Nepal – Dilip Nepali; Singapore – Zane Ong; Venezuela – Acasio Peña	

=== Special awards ===
Award	Contestant	Ref.
Best in Swimwear	Spain – Francisco Zafra	
Best in Formal Wear	Philippines — Marvin Diamante	

== Contestants ==
More than 25 participants appeared in the 2024 edition of Mister International.

Country/Territory	Candidates
United Kingdom	Joseph Atkins
India	Adong Jamatia
Brazil	Nathanael Santos
Cambodia	Ry Sovannak
Colombia	Nelson Ruiz
Ecuador	Mario Fernando Perez Rivera
Galápagos Islands	Flavio Romero
Hong Kong	Liu Guijun
Indonesia	Elias Silitonga
Malaysia	Datu Musthafa
Mexico	Gustavo Olmos
Myanmar	Minn Minn Shin Thant
Nepal	Dilip Nepali
Japan	Akira Hatekayama
Nigeria	Great Ocheni
Peru	Estefano Balarin
Philippines	Marvin Diamante
Puerto Rico	Angel Salcedo Velez
Singapore	Zane Ong
Sri Lanka	Sudeera Perera
Spain	Francisco Zafra
China	Zeng Xianyang
Venezuela	Acasio Peña
Vietnam	Mai Hieu Trung
Italy	Gabriele Calà

== See also ==
- List of beauty pageants
