= Macabebe =

Municipality in Pampanga, Philippines

- Municipality
- Municipality of Macabebe
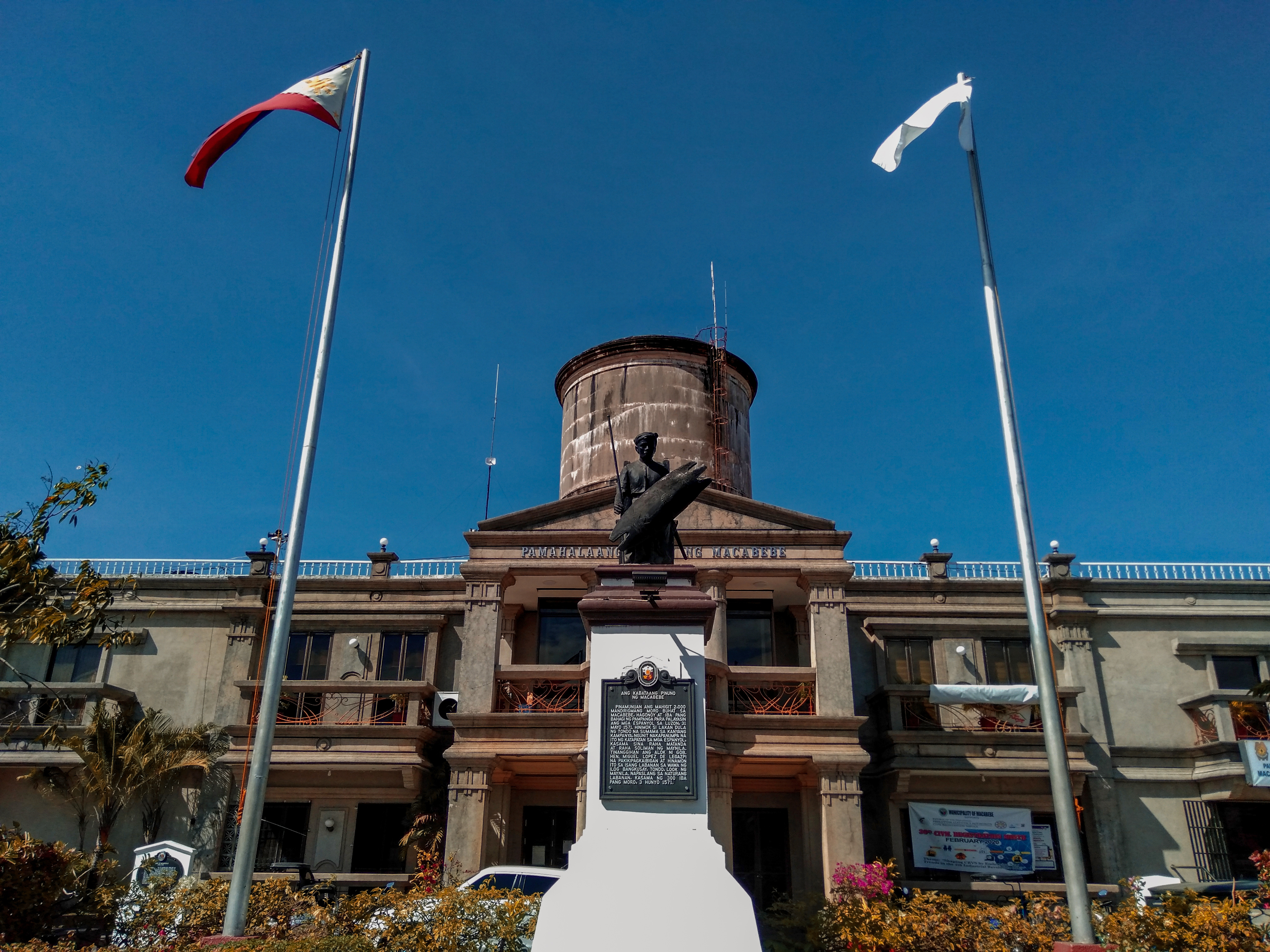
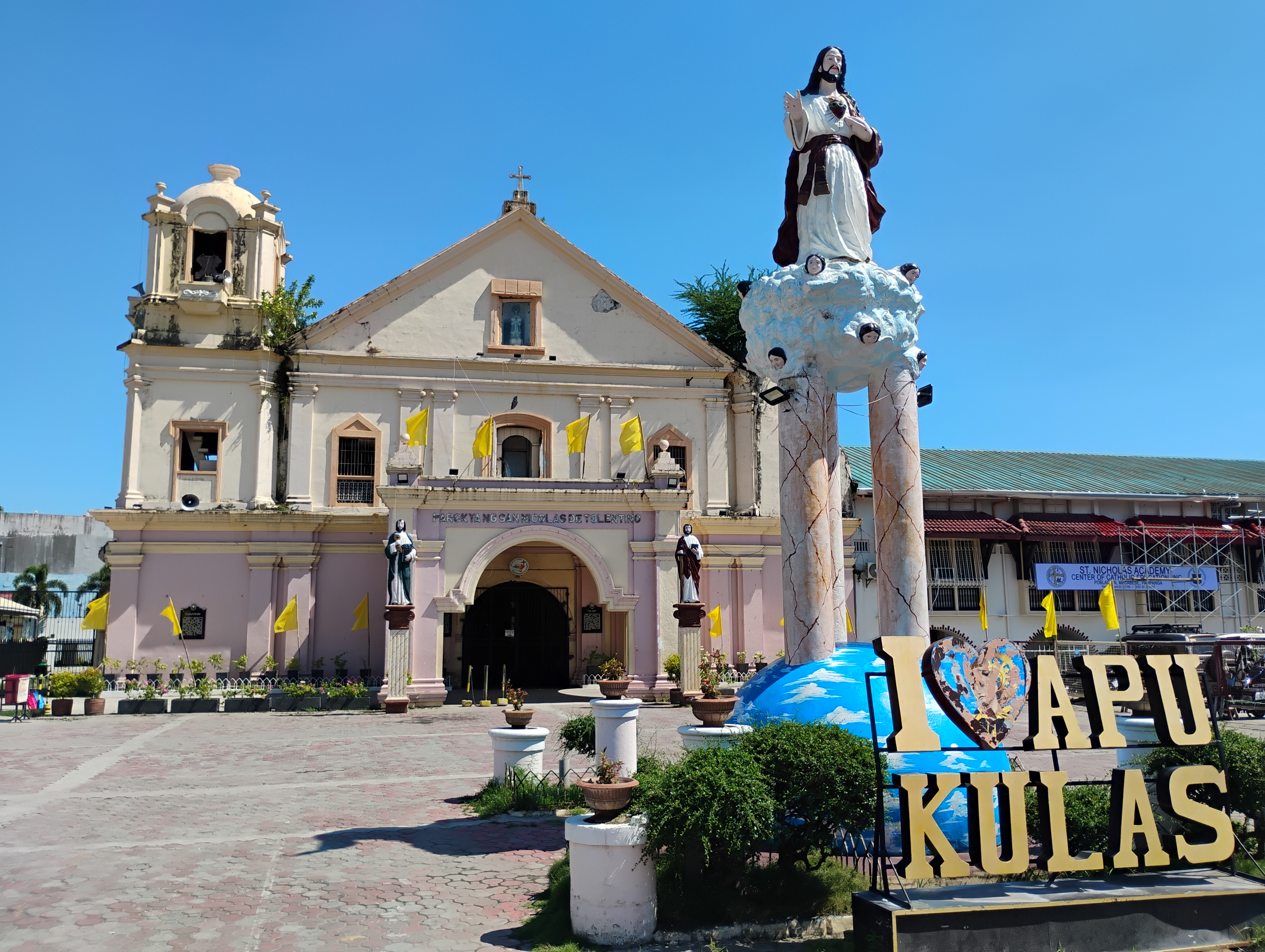
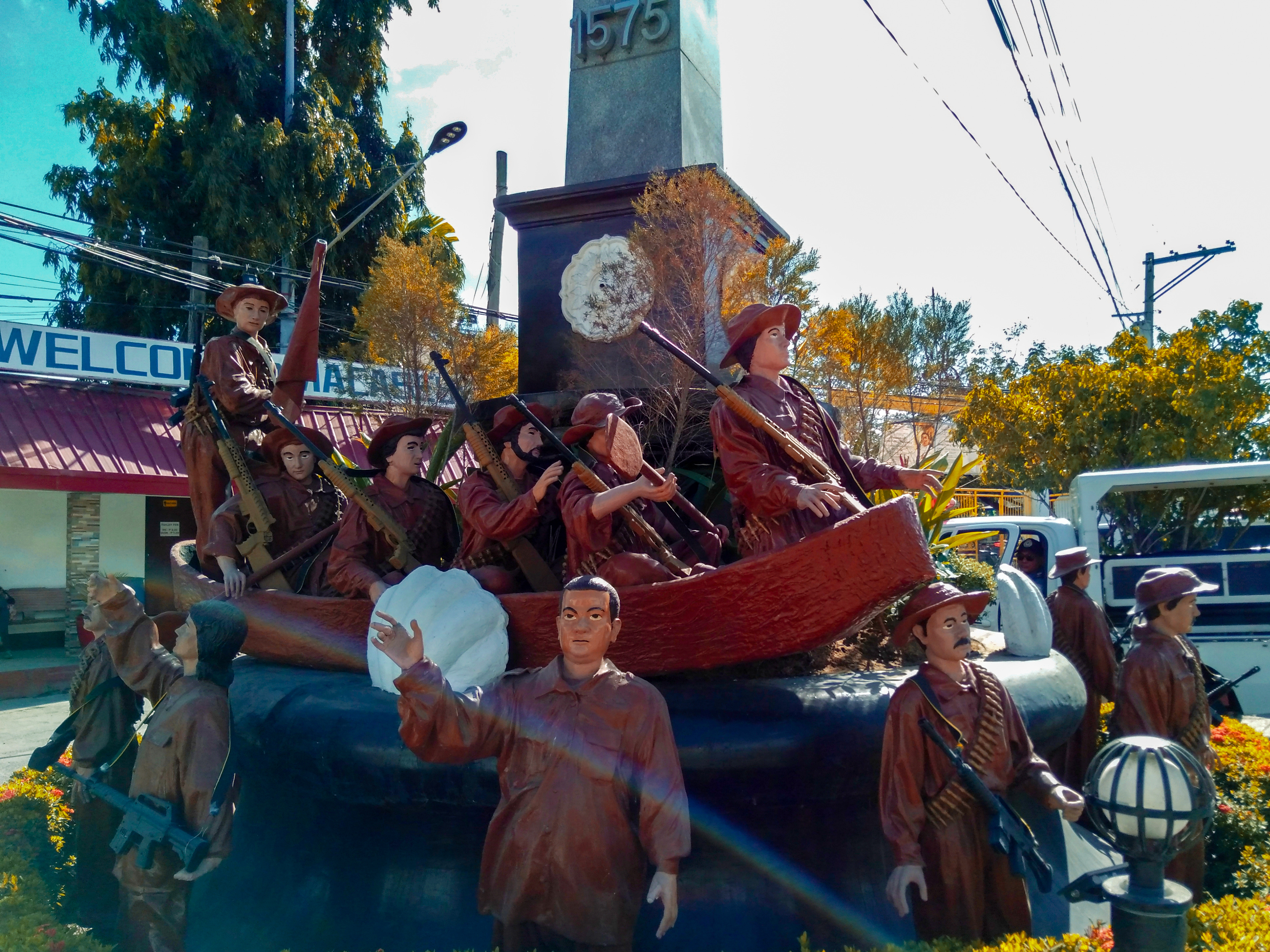
- Macabebe Municipal Hall San Nicolas de Tolentino Parish Church Macabebe Scouts Monument

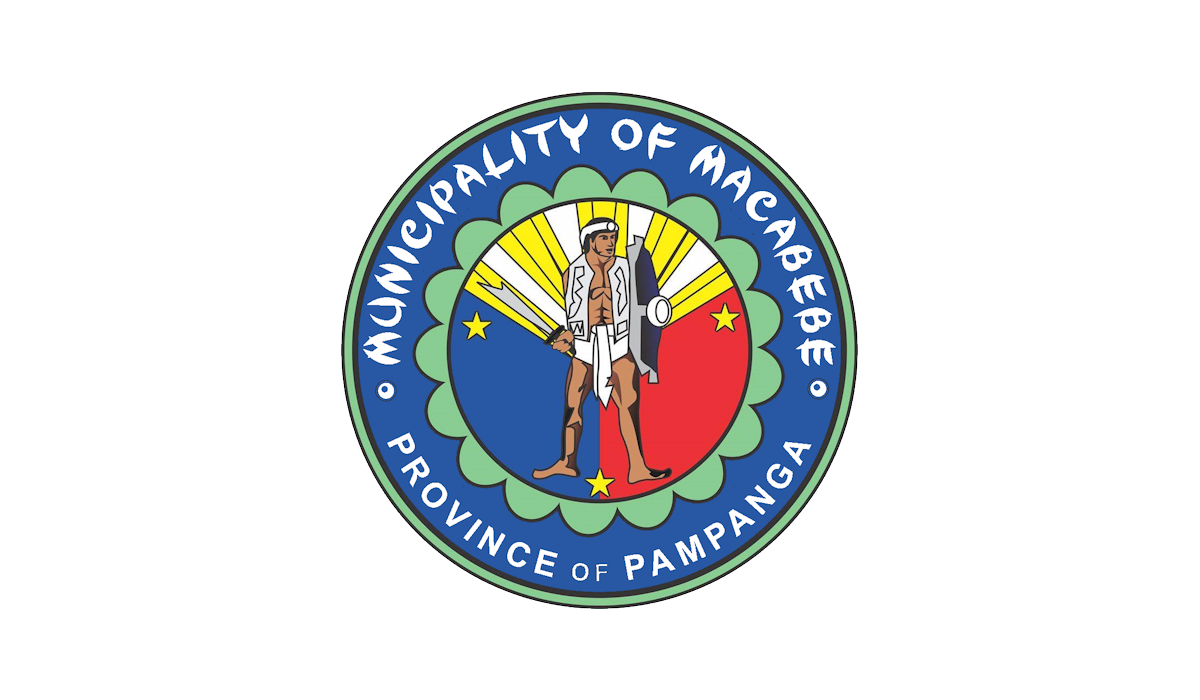
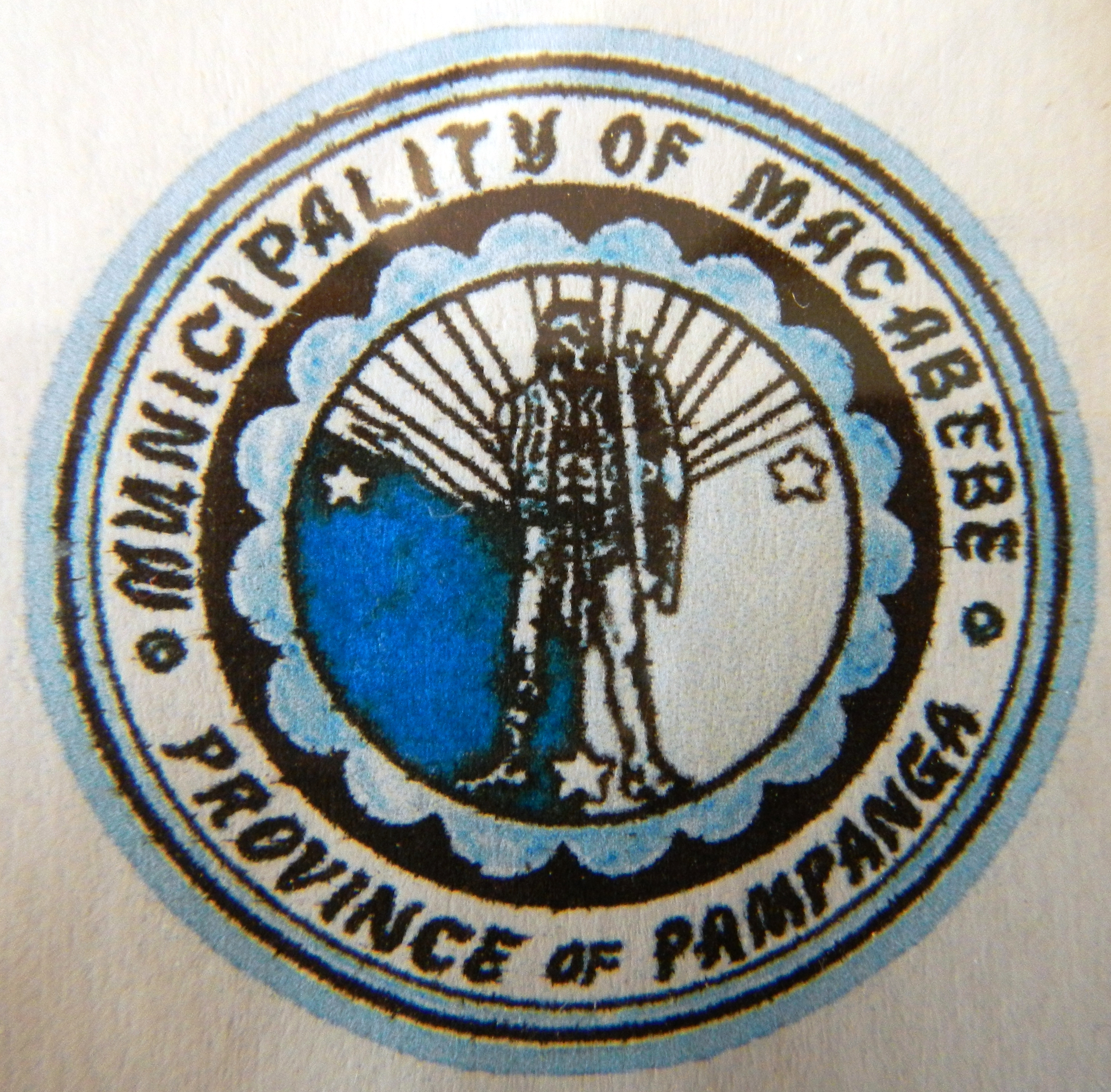
- Flag Seal
- Motto(s): "Memalen Macabebe, tapat makiabe!"
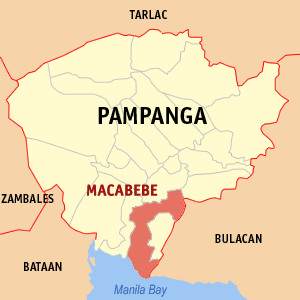
- Map of Pampanga with Macabebe highlighted
- Interactive map of Macabebe
- Location within the Philippines
- Coordinates: 14°54′29″N 120°42′56″E
- Country: Philippines
- Region: Central Luzon
- Province: Pampanga
- District: 4th district
- Founded: January 17, 1575
- Barangays: 25 (see Barangays)

Government
  - Type: Sangguniang Bayan
  - Mayor: Leonardo B. Flores
  - Vice Mayor: Vince Edward F. Flores
  - Representative: Anna York P. Bondoc
  - Municipal Council: Members: Rolando D. Balingit; Albert B. Flores; Francisco L. Macalino III; Ma. Victoria Q. Pama; Dennis D. Yumang; Germelino Y. Yabut Jr.; Joel S. Simpauco; Geminiano Y. Yanga
  - Electorate: 45,766 voters (2025)

Area
  - Total: 105.16 km^{2} (40.60 sq mi)
- Elevation: 5.0 m (16.4 ft)
- Highest elevation: 57 m (187 ft)
- Lowest elevation: −4 m (−13 ft)

Population (2024 census)
  - Total: 82,933
  - Density: 788.64/km^{2} (2,042.6/sq mi)
  - Households: 17,956

Economy
  - Income class: 1st municipal income class
  - Poverty incidence: 10.65% (2023)
  - Revenue: ₱ 286.3 million (2024)
  - Assets: ₱ 534.7 million (2024)
  - Expenditure: ₱ 284 million (2024)
  - Liabilities: ₱ 292.2 million (2024)

Service provider
  - Electricity: Pampanga 3 Electric Cooperative (PELCO 3)
- Time zone: UTC+8 (PST)
- ZIP code: 2018
- PSGC: 0305410000
- IDD : area code: +63 (0)45
- Native languages: Kapampangan; Tagalog

Macabebe, officially the Municipality of Macabebe (Kapampangan: Balen ning Macabebe; Tagalog: Bayan ng Macabebe), is a municipality in the province of Pampanga, Philippines. According to the 2024 census, it has a population of 82,933 people.

== Etymology ==
The town was named Macabebe because it is located along the shores (Pampangan: bebe; Tagalog: baybay) or banks of Río Grande de Pampanga. The town is sometimes referred to as Makabibe because of the abundance of corals and shells along the Río Grande in earlier times. The English translation of Macabebe, meaning: 'surrounded by rivers' describes the historical heritage of the ancient town.

== History ==
The residents of Macabebe had played conflicting roles in the history of the Philippines. They fought against the Spanish in 1571, during which Tarik Soliman (Bambalito) became the first recorded Kapampangan to fight against Spanish rule. They also defended the last Spanish garrison against revolutionaries in 1898. The services of the Macabebes led to the naming of a street in the Spanish capital, Madrid, in their honor, "Calle de Voluntarios Macabebes."

The residents of Macabebe were also allies of imperial Spain when the Dutch invaders tried to colonize the Philippines. They fought together with the Spaniards to protect the islands from its invaders, and in return only the Kapampangan were allowed to study in prominent exclusive schools and universities run by the Spaniards.

In 1898, the town was destroyed by Revolutionary General Antonio Luna during the Philippine Revolution. As retaliation for supporting Spain and harboring Spanish stragglers, Luna ordered the town razed, though General José Alejandrino prevented its total destruction. This followed the Macabebes' historic support for Spanish colonial rule. Aftermath: Due to this destruction and conflicts with the Republic, many residents later joined the "Macabebe Scouts" to support American forces.

In 1901, American General Frederick Funston and his troops captured Philippine President Emilio Aguinaldo in Palanan, Isabela, with the help of some Kapampangans (later called the Macabebe Scouts after their home locale) who had joined the Americans' side. The Americans pretended to be captives of the Macabebes, who were dressed in Philippine Army uniforms. Once Funston and his "captors" entered Aguinaldo's camp, they immediately apprehended Aguinaldo and his men.

During World War II, Japanese fighter and bomber planes attacked Macabebe in December 1941. Macabebe was subsequently occupied by the Japanese Imperial Army in 1942.

== Geography ==
Macabebe is located in the southern part of Pampanga. It is bordered to the north by the municipalities of Minalin, Guagua and Apalit; to the east by the municipalities of Calumpit and Hagonoy in Bulacan; to the west by the municipality of Sasmuan; and to the south by the municipality of Masantol and Manila Bay. It is one of the three coastal towns in Pampanga along with Sasmuan and Lubao.

Macabebe is 17 kilometres (11 mi) from San Fernando and 61 kilometres (38 mi) from Manila.

=== Barangays ===
Macabebe is politically subdivided into 25 barangays, as shown below. Each barangay consists of puroks and some have sitios.

- Batasan
- Caduang Tete
- Candelaria
- Castuli
- Consuelo
- Dalayap
- Mataguiti
- San Esteban
- San Francisco
- San Gabriel (Poblacion)
- San Isidro (Poblacion)
- San Jose
- San Juan
- San Rafael
- San Roque (Poblacion)
- San Vicente
- Santa Cruz (Poblacion)
- Santa Lutgarda
- Santa Maria
- Santa Rita (Poblacion)
- Santo Niño
- Santo Rosario (Poblacion)
- Saplad David
- Tacasan
- Telacsan

=== Climate ===
Climate data for Macabebe, Pampanga
Month	Jan	Feb	Mar	Apr	May	Jun	Jul	Aug	Sep	Oct	Nov	Dec	Year
Mean daily maximum °C (°F)	28 (82)	29 (84)	31 (88)	33 (91)	32 (90)	31 (88)	30 (86)	29 (84)	29 (84)	30 (86)	30 (86)	28 (82)	30 (86)
Mean daily minimum °C (°F)	20 (68)	20 (68)	21 (70)	23 (73)	24 (75)	24 (75)	24 (75)	24 (75)	24 (75)	23 (73)	22 (72)	21 (70)	23 (72)
Average precipitation mm (inches)	6 (0.2)	4 (0.2)	6 (0.2)	17 (0.7)	82 (3.2)	122 (4.8)	151 (5.9)	123 (4.8)	124 (4.9)	99 (3.9)	37 (1.5)	21 (0.8)	792 (31.1)
Average rainy days	3.3	2.5	3.6	6.6	17.7	22.2	25.2	23.7	23.2	17.9	9.2	5.2	160.3
Source: Meteoblue

== Demographics ==
Population census of Macabebe

Year	Pop.	±% p.a.
1903	14,405	—
1918	16,100	+0.74%
1939	20,149	+1.07%
1948	17,647	−1.46%
1960	27,888	+3.89%
1970	39,017	+3.41%
1975	42,397	+1.68%
1980	45,830	+1.57%

Year	Pop.	±% p.a.
1990	55,505	+1.93%
1995	59,469	+1.30%
2000	65,346	+2.04%
2007	70,332	+1.02%
2010	70,777	+0.23%
2015	75,850	+1.33%
2020	78,151	+0.63%
2024	82,933	+1.44%

Source: Philippine Statistics Authority

In the 2024 census, the population of Macabebe was 82,933 people, with a density of 790 inhabitants per square kilometre or 2,000 inhabitants per square mile.

=== Religion ===
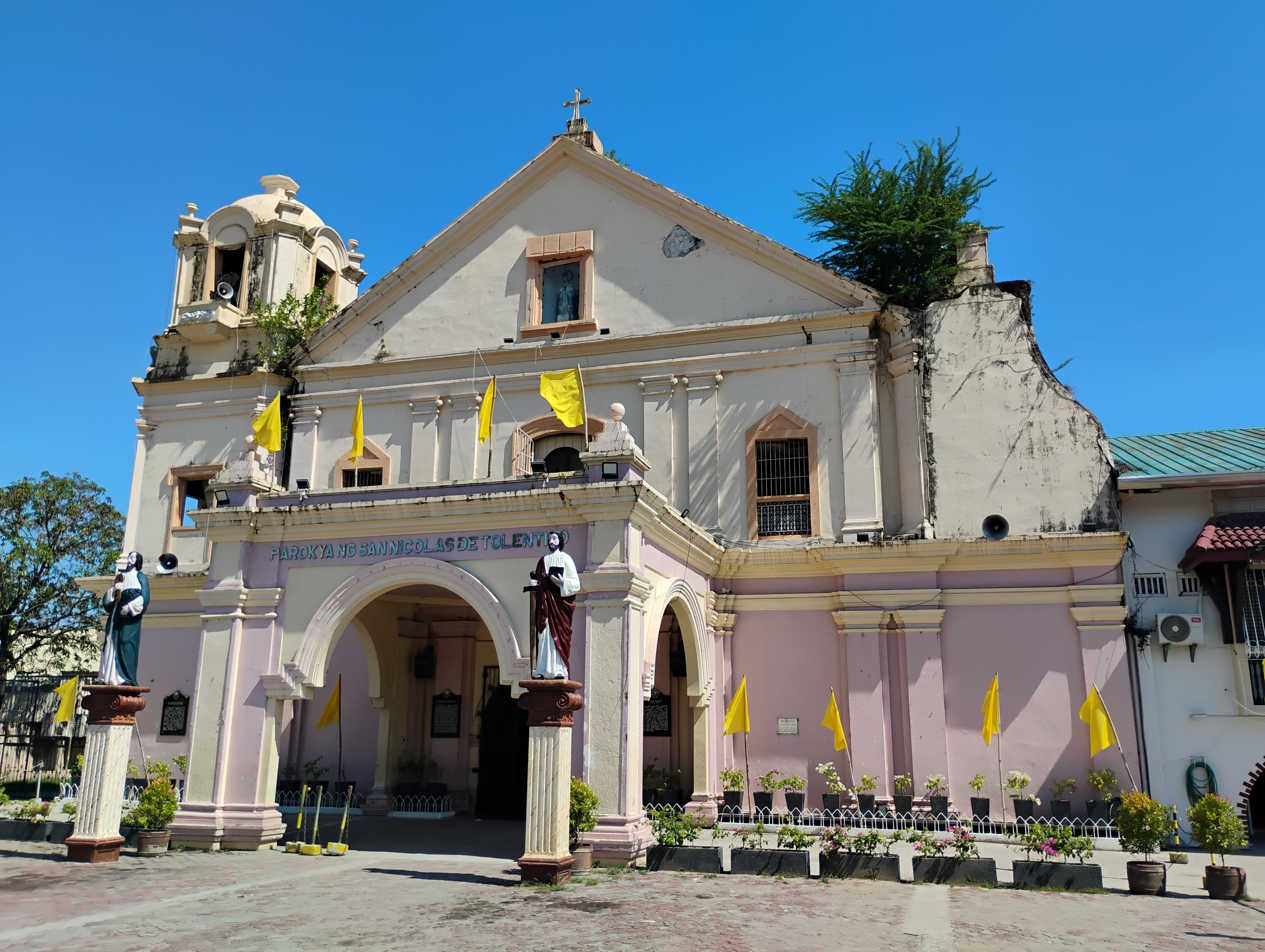
San Nicolas de Tolentino Parish Church

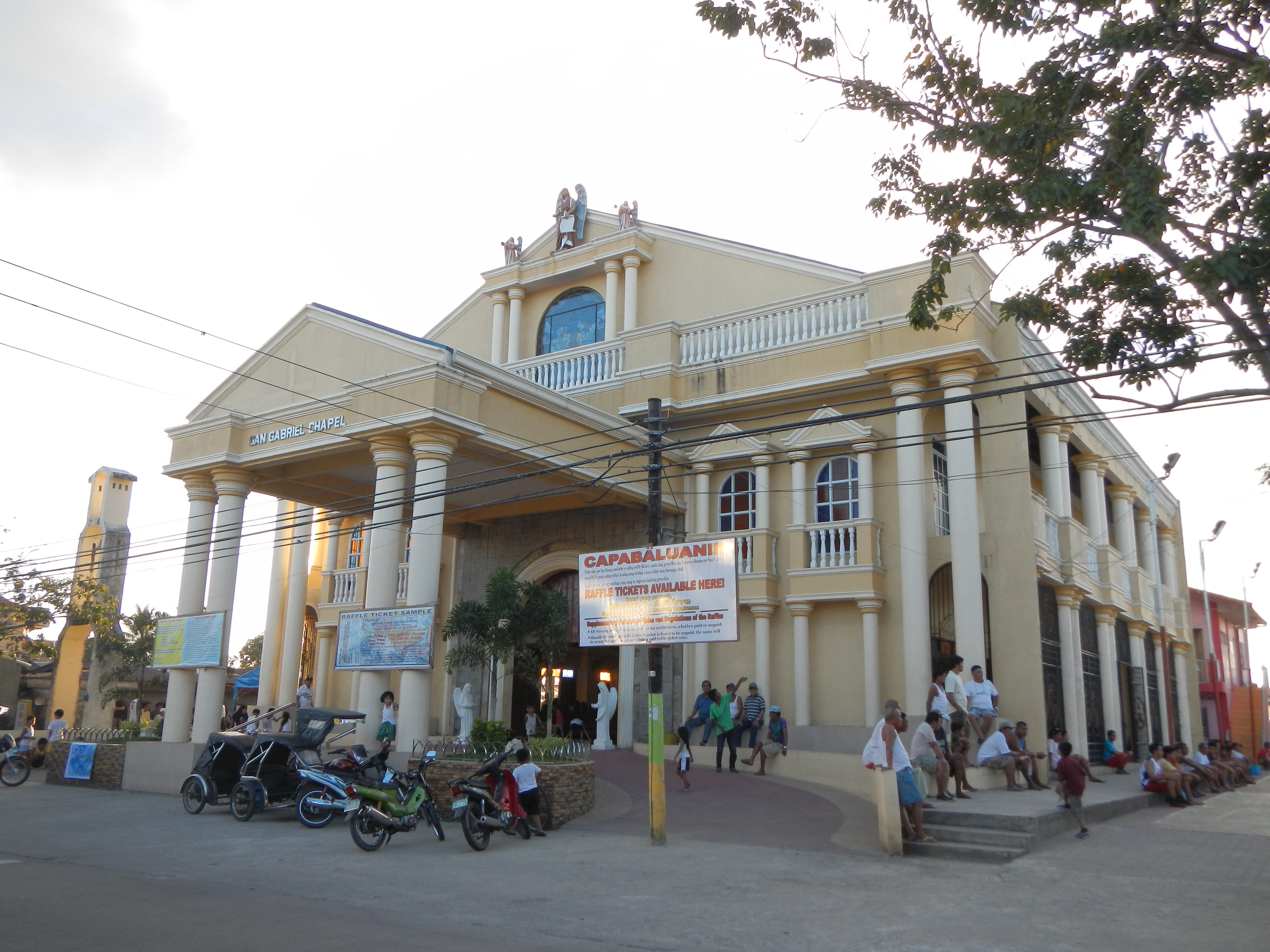
San Gabriel Chapel

Roman Catholicism is the town inhabitants' main religion. The town's population is composed of the following: Catholics 82%, Members Church of God International 5%, Iglesia ni Cristo 8%, Evangelicals 2%, others 3%.

==== Churches ====
The Roman Catholic Archdiocese of San Fernando has jurisdiction over the San Nicolas de Tolentino Parish Church. It was founded in 1575 under the advocation of San Nicolas de Tolentino. The heritage church measures 70 metres (230 ft) long, 17 metres (56 ft) wide and 11 metres (36 ft) high. The facade of the church has scant ornamentation and its architectural symmetry is lost amid the various forms assumed windows, and the main entrance. Simple neo-classic lines of the facade.

In the 1600s, San Nicolas cookie or 'Pan de San Nicolas', an iconic Kapampangan cuisine delicacy with healing powers evolved from the town. It is baked in honor of "Apung Kulas", the patron saint of bakers and the town. The Blessed Virgin Mary healed his illness with a piece of bread. The shortbread is made of butter, egg yolk, flour and coconut milk poured in Nicolas wooden molds then baked.

Macabebe is also home to San Gabriel Chapel. This newly erected chapel is a replacement of the old chapel that has been devastated by the flooding after the Mt. Pinatubo eruption. It was then formally constructed in 2002 and came into completion and inaugurated in May 2010.

Another important church in the town is the Presentation of the Lord Parish in barangay Batasan. The chapel has been built over a century ago and was elevated to a parish church in 1995. Its first "cura parroco" was Father Gabriel Torres.

One of the most visited churches in Macabebe is the Sta Maria Chapel, the home of the barangay's Queen and Patroness (NUESTRA SENIORA DELA PAZ). The chapel is under the jurisdiction of San Rafael Archangel Parish Church. The newly erected chapel is a replacement of the old chapel because the old one has always been flooded during the rainy season. After the completion of its renovation, it was inaugurated in April 2005, and blessed by Archbishop Paciano Aniceto, DD. The place where the church is erected was called "baliti". The name was attributed to the fact that prior to the arrival of the Spaniards in Macabebe, at that exact place, it was believed that a big balete tree was planted.

== Economy ==
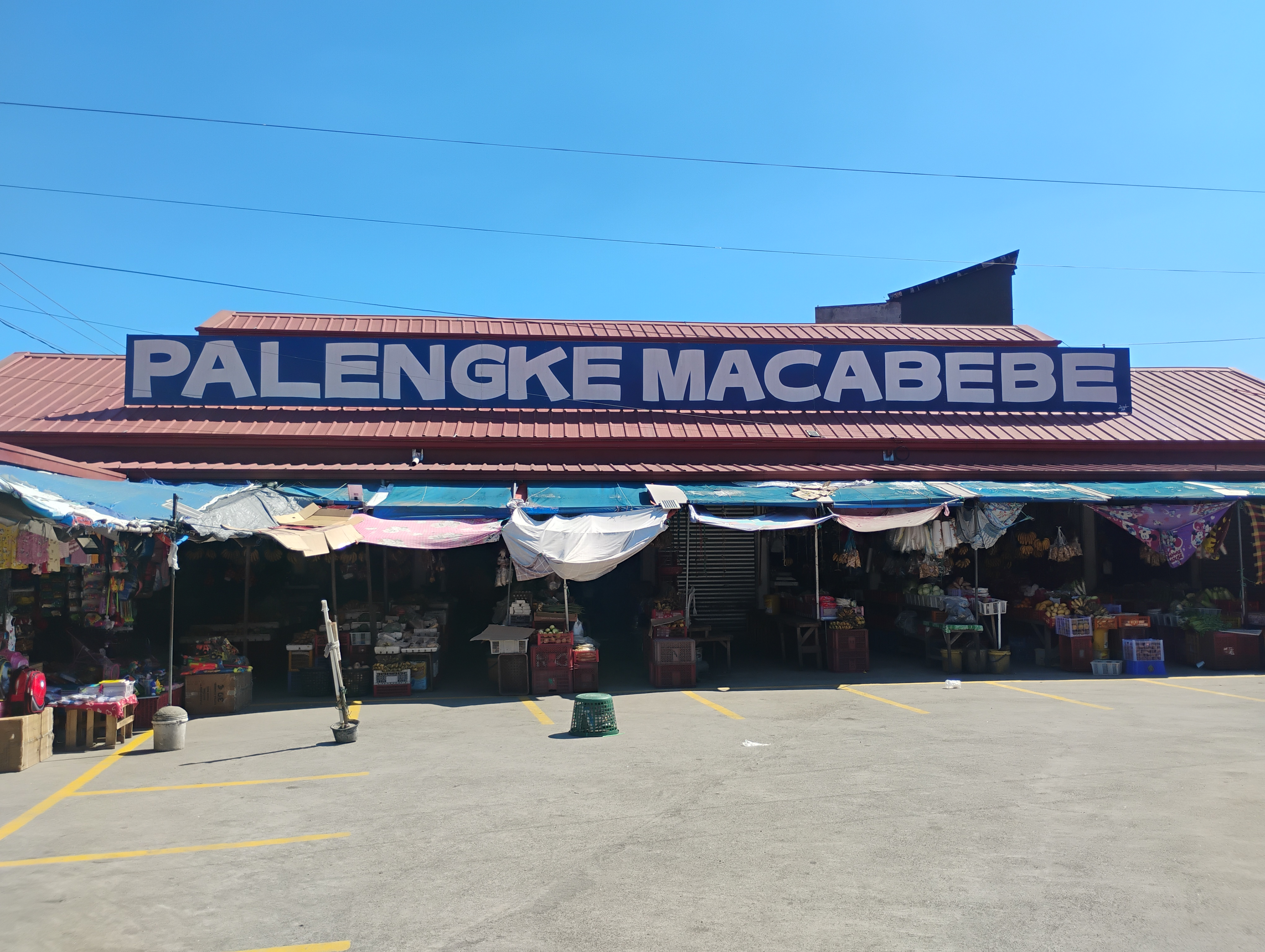
Macabebe Public Market

Poverty incidence of Macabebe (%)

Source: Philippine Statistics Authority

== Government ==
=== Local government ===
Like other towns in the Philippines, Macabebe is governed by a mayor and vice mayor who are elected for three-year terms. The mayor is the executive head and leads the town's departments in executing the ordinances and improving public services. The vice mayor heads a legislative council (Sangguniang Bayan) consisting of councilors from the barangays of barrios. The District Office of the Congressional representative stands near the town centre.

== Culture ==
The town is rich in history and treasures. Its town hall and churches reveal the wealth of the town's heritage.

=== Town Fiesta ===
The town's fiesta is held annually on the 10th of September in honor of San Nicolas de Tolentino, the town's patron saint.

=== Barangay Fiestas ===
- Barangay Santa Maria. (Nuestra Señora dela Paz) or locally known as "Apung Maria" has the largest area among all other barangays in Macabebe. The image of the Virgin is the most venerated Marian image in the town and in the province of Pampanga. Every fiesta eve, they bring the original image to "Taldawa" or bukid (which is now under the place of Masantol & Minalin) for a house to house blessing within the whole day by means of "limbun", a Kapampangan term for Libot or Umiikot. Only Apung Maria can do that wonderful event all over the province because she's connecting and making the way again in the place that Macabebe owns before. The feast day is every last Saturday and Sunday of the month of April, and holds one of the most grandiose festivity in the whole town of Macabebe. Devotees from abroad and Manila and locals of Pampanga come together to give honor and celebrate her festivity. During her festivity, they gather around to the original image for a grand procession (afternoon and evening) in tuned of Batalya, as she is known as LA REINA DE BATALYA, in honor of St. Mary, Mother of Jesus.
- Barangay San Jose celebrates fiesta on the 3rd Sunday of March in honor of Saint Joseph.
- Barangay Saplad David celebrates fiesta on 9 January in honor of the Black Nazarene.
- Barangay Santo Rosario celebrates fiesta on 1 May in honor of the Our Lady of the Most Holy Rosary.
- Barangay San Rafael celebrates fiesta on 24 October in honor of St. Raphael the Archangel
- Barangay San Juan celebrates fiesta on 24 June in honor of Saint John the Baptist, people splash water to each other.
- Barangay San Gabriel and Barangay Caduang Tete celebrate fiesta on the 2nd Sunday of May and 29 September in honor of St. Gabriel the Archangel.
- Barangay San Isidro celebrates fiesta on 15 May in honor of Saint Isidore the Farmer.
- Barangay Santo Niño celebrates fiesta twice a year one is on the 3rd Sunday of January and the other on the 3rd Sunday of April in honor of the Santo Niño.
- Barangay Batasan celebrates its fiesta on 2 February in honor of Nuestra Señora de Candelaria and the "Presentation of the Lord Parish".
- Barangay Santa Rita and Dalayap celebrates fiesta on 22 May in honor of Saint Rita of Cascia.
- Barangay San Roque celebrates fiesta on the 1st Sunday of May in honor of Saint Roch but the Western celebrates his death on 16 August.
- Barangay Santa Lutgarda celebrates fiesta on the 1st Sunday of May and on 16 June in honor of the birth of their patron Apung Santa Lutgarda.
- Barangay San Vicente celebrates fiesta on the 1st and 4th Saturday and Sunday of the month of April in honor of St. Vincent Ferrer.
- Barangay San Francisco celebrates fiesta on the last Sunday of April and on 4 October in honor of Saint Francis of Assisi.
- Barangay Castuli celebrates their fiesta on the last Saturday of February in honor of Our Lady of Lourdes.
- Barangay Mataguiti celebrates their fiesta on the 1st Sunday of May and known for having a "libad" or boat procession in honoring the Lord Jesus Christ cross as their patron.
- Barangay Candelaria celebrates fiesta on 2 February and known for having a "libad" or boat procession in honoring the Nuestra Señora de Candelaria.
- Barangay Consuelo celebrates their fiesta on 3rd Saturday and last Saturday of the month of April in honor of Sto. Niño.
- Barangay San Esteban celebrates their fiesta on the 4th Sunday of April in honor of Saint Stephen.
- Barangay Santa Cruz celebrates their fiesta on 3 May.
- Barangay Tacasan celebrates fiesta on 19 March in honor of Apung San José.
- Barangay Telacsan celebrates their fiesta on 15 May and 31 December (the last day of the year) to give thanks to St. Isidore, their patron saint, for all the blessings that they have received for the whole year.

== Healthcare ==
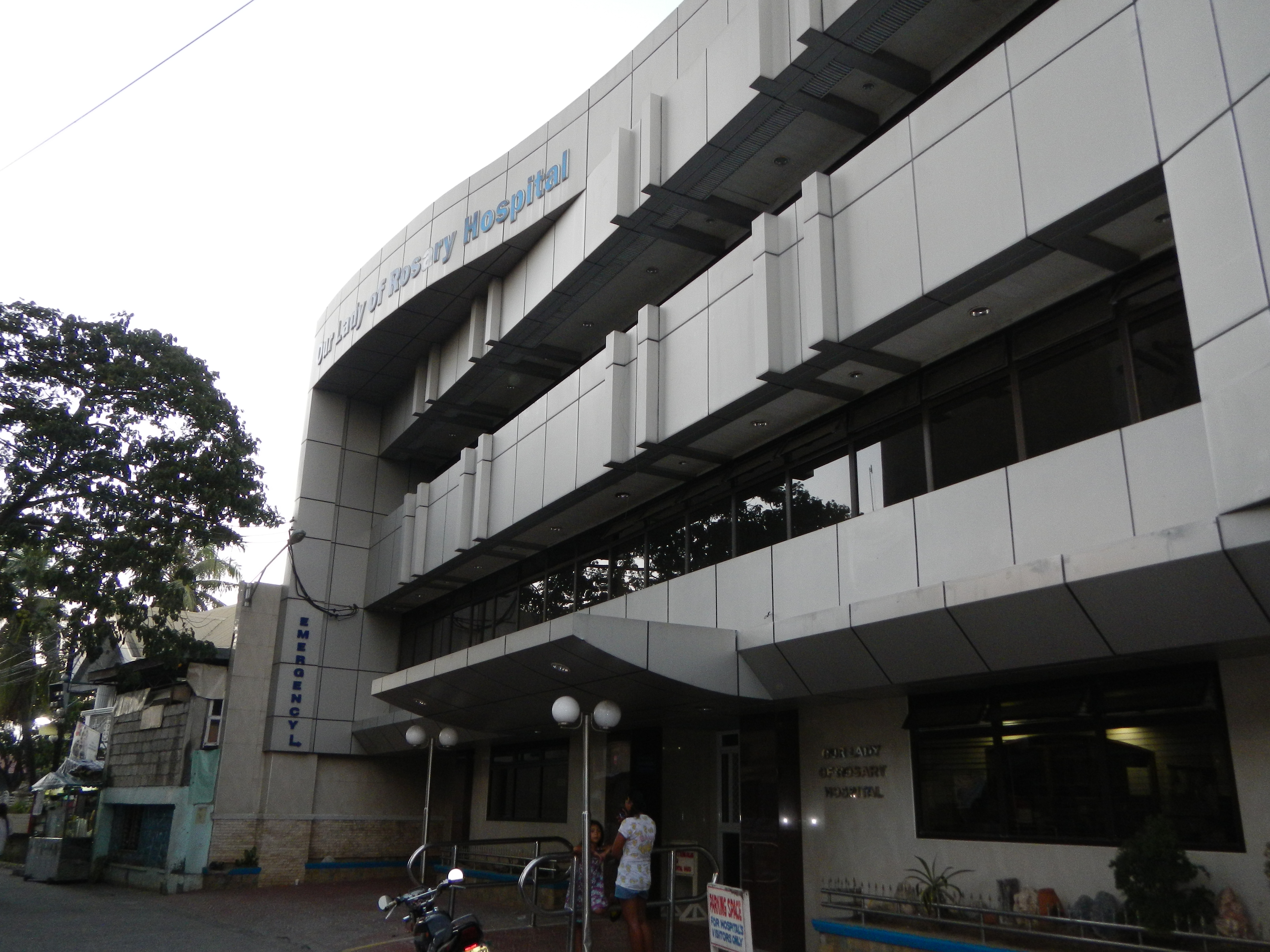
Our Lady of Rosary Hospital

The town provides medical missions and free medical operations, including fully functional health facilities serves in every barangay. There are few hospitals in the town.

The town's health care needs is provided by the Mayor Domingo B. Flores Memorial District Hospital located in Barangay Batasan.

== Education ==
There are two schools district offices which govern all educational institutions within the municipality. They oversee the management and operations of all private and public, from primary to secondary schools. These are the Macabebe East Schools District Office, and Macabebe West Schools District Office.

=== Primary and elementary schools ===
- Batasan Elementary School
- Caduang Tete Elementary School
- Candelaria Integrated School
- Castuli Elementary School
- Consuelo Elementary School
- Dalan Baliti Elementary School
- Dalayap Elementary School
- Lolu Elementary School
- Macabebe Elementary School
- San Esteban Elementary School
- San Gabriel Elementary School
- San Jose Elementary School
- San Juan Elementary School
- San Isidro Elementary School
- San Rafael Elementary School
- San Roque Elementary School
- San Vicente Ferrer Elementary School
- San Vicente-San Francisco Elementary School
- Sapang Malalam Elementary School
- Saplad David Elementary School
- Sitio Mindanao Integrated School
- Sta. Lutgarda Integrated School
- Sta. Maria Central School
- Sta. Rita Elementary School
- Sto. Nino Elementary School
- Sto. Rosario Elementary School
- Tacasan Elementary School
- Telacsan Elementary School

=== Secondary schools ===
- Caduang Tete High School
- Candelaria Integrated School
- Consuelo High School
- Dalayap High School
- Macabebe High School
- San Esteban National High School
- San Vicente-San Francisco National High School
- Sta. Lutgarda Integrated School
- Sitio Mindanao Integrated School
- Sta. Maria National High School
- Telacsan National High School

=== Private Schools ===
- Colegio De San Lorenzo
- St. Nicholas Academy
- Pampanga Colleges

=== Higher educational institution ===
- Pampanga Colleges

== Notable personalities ==
- "The Youth Leader of Macabebe" – Also known as "Tarik Sulayman" and "Bambalito"; rebel who fought the Spaniards in the Battle of Bangkusay.
- Felipe Sonsong, a soldier turned saintly missionary who is now a candidate for sainthood.
- Jay Sonza, journalist
- Vicente Manansala, National Artist for Painting (1981)
- Mark Macapagal, basketball player
- Remy Martin, Filipino-American basketball player
- Camille Prats, actress, TV host and comedienne
- John Prats, actor, comedian, TV host, model and dancer
- Tony Ferrer, actor, film director and producer
- Maricel Laxa, actress
- Juan Severino Mallari, Roman Catholic priest who was also the first known Filipino serial killer.
