= Mister International 2023 (Philippines) =

15th edition of Mister International (Philippines)

- Date: October 20, 2023
- Presenters: Sean Kyle Ortega; Emma Tiglao
- Venue: Cordillera Convention Center of Baguio Country Club, Baguio, Philippines
- Broadcaster: YouTube / Facebook
- Entrants: 26
- Placements: 16
- Debuts: Ghana; Jamaica; Argentina; Uzbekistan; United Kingdom
- Withdrawals: Albania; Belgium; Dominican Republic; Taiwan; Haiti; Netherlands; South Korea; Hong Kong; Kazakhstan; Laos; Nicaragua; Panama; Peru; France; Puerto Rico; Czech Republic; Sierra Leone; Sri Lanka; Thailand; Switzerland; Venezuela
- Returns: Poland; Canada; Costa Rica; South Africa; Nigeria; Australia; Vietnam
- Winner: José Calle; Spain
- Congeniality: Abishek Chudal; Nepal
- Personality: Kofi Adea-Adu; South Africa
- Best National Costume: Austin Cabatana; Philippines
- Performer: Ballet Baguio; Alyssa Erasquin

Mister International 2023 was the 15th Mister International competition, held at Cordillera Convention Center of Baguio Country Club, Baguio, Philippines, on October 20, 2023. Candidates from 26 countries and autonomous territories competed for the title.

This pageant was organized by the Philippine-based Mister International Organization, in parallel of the Mister International 2023 pageant in Bangkok of the Thailand-based organization, which claims to be the legitimate organizer of the pageant.

José Calle, from Spain, won the title of Mister International 2023 on October 20, 2023, at the Cordillera Convention Center of Baguio Country Club in Baguio, Philippines, becoming the first Spaniard to achieve the title. Jose Calle is another man from Málaga to make history in male beauty contests, following Juan García Postigo, who won the largest Mister World title in 2007 for Spain.

== Background ==
Originally, the 2023 Mister International edition was scheduled to be held on September 28 at Newport World Resorts in Pasay City, but it was later changed to October 20, 2023, with the final coronation taking place at the Cordillera Convention Center of Baguio Country Club in Baguio, Philippines.

This edition was hosted by Sean Kyle Ortega and Emma Tiglao. The panel of judges included the lineup of individuals: Ali Al Gawani, Anjali Camacho Pradeep Kumar, Atty. Ernelson Trojillo, Casmir Uwaegbute and Shikh Asheq Fakhran.

== Results ==
This is the results list where José Calle from Spain won the title on October 20 in Baguio, Philippines. He follows fellow Malagueño Juan García Postigo, who made history for Spain by winning Mister World in 2007.

Winner

Placement	Contestant	Ref.
Mister International 2023	Spain – José Antonio Campos Calle	
1st Runner-Up	Philippines – Austin Cabatana	
2nd Runner-Up	Jamaica – Tamichael Watson	
3rd Runner-Up	Argentina – Angel Olaya	
4th Runner-Up	Malaysia – Abdul Rahman Lee	
Top 8	Canada – Dhruv Kumar; Myanmar – Aung Khant Kyaw; USA – Anthony Borengasser	
Top 16	Cuba – Branden Alaen; Brazil – Eduardo Onofre; Costa Rica – Roberto Mena; Mexico – Christian Cardero; Nepal – Abishek Chudal; Nigeria – Samuel Michael Adebowale; United Kingdom – Ryan Larson; Uzbekistan – Laziz Rastomov	

=== Special awards ===
Award	Contestant	
Best in National Costume	Winner	Philippines — Austin Cabatana
Best in National Costume	First	Brazil — Eduardo Onofre
Best in National Costume	Second	Cambodia — Thea Sok Tola
Mister Photogenic	Spain – José Calle	
Mister Congeniality	Nepal – Abishek Chudal	
Mister Personality	South Africa – Kofi Adea-Adu	
Mister Swim Wear	Spain – José Calle	
Mister Formal Wear	Philippines – Austin Cabatana	
Mister Derma World	Spain – José Calle	
Top Model Awardee	Poland – Maciej Skowronek	
Multimedia Awardee	Singapore – Aidid Haidil	

== Organizational dispute ==
The Mister International 2022 pageant was the last undisputed edition of the competition. After the passing of its Singaporean founder, Alan Sim, in October 2022, the pageant entered a leadership crisis. Two individuals, Pradit Pradinunt from Thailand and Manuel Deldio from the Philippines, each claimed authority over the title, resulting in the emergence of two separate 15th editions of the pageant. On September 17, 2023, Kim Goodburn won the 15th Mister International competition held at the Crystal Design Center Ballroom in Khwaeng Khlong Chan, Bangkok, Thailand. A month later, on October 20, 2023, José Calle from Spain was awarded the same title at the Cordillera Convention Center, Baguio Country Club, in Baguio, Philippines.

== Contestants ==
The 2023 edition of Mister International featured the following countries and territories.

Country/Territory	Candidates	Ref.
Argentina	Angel Olaya	
Australia	Casey Van Ryan	
Brazil	Eduardo Onofre	
Cambodia	Thea Sok Tola	
Canada	Dhruv Kumar	
Costa Rica	Roberto Mena	
Cuba	Branden Alaen	
Ghana	Richard Yaw-Emefa	
India	Jairus Singh	
Indonesia	Isaac Kbarek	
Jamaica	Tamichael Watson	
Japan	Takumi Ozawa	
Malaysia	Abdul Rahman Lee	
Mexico	Christian Cardero	
Myanmar	Aung Khant Kyaw	
Nepal	Abishek Chudal	
Nigeria	Michael Adebowale	
Philippines	Austin Cabana	
Poland	Maciej Skowronek	
Singapore	Aidid Haidil	
South Africa	Kofi Adea-Adu	
Spain	José Calle	
United Kingdom	Ryan Larson	
United States	Anthony Borengasser	
Uzbekistan	Laziz Rastomov	
Vietnam	Nguyễn Văn Phi	

== See also ==
- List of beauty pageants
