= Mister International 2022 =

14th edition of the Mister International competition

- Date: October 30, 2022
- Presenters: Michael Bristol
- Venue: New Frontier Theater, Quezon City, Metro Manila, Philippines
- Broadcaster: Youtube
- Entrants: 35
- Placements: 16
- Debuts: Albania; Cuba; Laos; Sierra Leone
- Withdrawals: Australia; Bolivia; Chile; China; Colombia; Ecuador; Guam; Lebanon; Nigeria; Norway; Poland; Russia; Slovenia; South Africa; Sweden; Vietnam
- Returns: France; Kazakhstan; Myanmar
- Winner: Emmanuel "Manu" Franco (thailand version) | Lukanand Kshetrimayum (Philippines Version); Dominican Republic | India
- Congeniality: Ryo Yatogo; Japan
- Best National Costume: Jason Julius; Indonesia
- Photogenic: Surasak Muangkaew; Thailand

Mister International 2022 was the 14th Mister International competition, held at the New Frontier Theater in Quezon City, Metro Manila, Philippines, on October 30, 2022. Candidates from 35 countries and territories competed for the title.

Emmanuel "Manu" Franco of the Dominican Republic at the end of the event was granted as the winner on the coronation night. Following an organizational restructuring in 2023, the Mister International splits into two, The Organization (Philippines) formally appointed Lukanand Kshetrimayum as the official Mister International 2022 Titleholder and subsequently becoming the Managing Director.

This is the last undisputed edition of Mister International. Following the death of its Singaporean founder Alan Sim in October 2022, the pageant plunged into a leadership crisis with two successors; Pradit Pradinunt of Thailand and Manuel Deldio of the Philippines. Two pageants were held the next year both of which claiming to be the legitimate 15th edition.

== Background ==
=== Selection of participants ===
Contestants from 35 countries and territories have been selected to compete. The 2022 edition was known as the 14th edition of Mister International after a three-year hiatus from the COVID-19 pandemic.

The 2022 edition seen the debut of Albania, Cuba, Laos, and Sierra Leone, returning countries from France, Kazakhstan, Myanmar, and withdrawals from Australia, China, Norway, Slovenia, and Sweden.

Delegates were winners from their national pageants or appointed to their positions after being a runner-up in their national pageant between 2019 and 2022 and/or being selected through a casting process.

== Results ==
Placements announced by the pageant were as follows:

Placement	Contestant
Mister International 2022	Dominican Republic – Emmanuel "Manu" Franco
1st Runner-Up	India – Lukanand Kshetrimayum
2nd Runner-Up	Venezuela – Orangel Dirinot
3rd Runner-Up	Hong Kong – Jason Li Kwai Chiu
4th Runner-Up	Philippines – Myron Jude Ordillano
5th Runner-Up	Spain – Juan Pablo Colías
Top 10	Cuba – Rubert Arias; Mexico – Andres Villegas; Thailand – Surasak Muangkaew; United States – Daryn Friedman
Top 16	Brazil – Luan Antonelli; Czech Republic – Matěj Švec; Malaysia – Hugo Amandus; Netherlands – Iliya Shahedi; Peru – Eleazar Moreno; Switzerland – Marcel Riera

=== Special awards ===
Award	Contestant	Ref.
Best in Formal Wear	Dominican Republic – Emmanuel “Manu” Franco	
Best in Swimwear	Spain – Juan Pablo Colías	
Best National Costume	Indonesia – Jason Julius	
Mister Congeniality	Japan – Ryo Yatogo	
Mister Personality	Albania – Boris Gurtner	
Mister Photogenic	Thailand – Surasak Muangkeaw	

== Contestants ==
35 contestants competed for the title:

Country/Territory	Delegate	Age (Note: Ages at the time of the pageant.)	Height	Hometown	Ref.
Albania	Boris Gurtner	22	1.78 m (5 ft 10 in)	Fribourg	
Belgium	Niels van Dijk	24	1.78 m (5 ft 10 in)	Bornem	
Brazil	Luan Antonelli	29	1.85 m (6 ft 1 in)	Jacinto Machado	
Cambodia	Bunchhat Eat	25	1.81 m (5 ft 11 1/2 in)	Phnom Penh	
Cuba	Rubert Manuel Arias	28	1.84 m (6 ft 1/2 in)	La Habana	
Czech Republic	Matěj Švec	23	1.95 m (6 ft 5 in)	Velešín	
Dominican Republic	Emmanuel "Manu" Franco	21	1.81 m (5 ft 11 1/2 in)	Distrito Nacional	
France	Pierre Carriou	21	1.78 m (5 ft 10 in)	Paimpol	
Haiti	Réginal Theodore Bien-Aime	29	1.80 m (5 ft 11 in)	Port-au-Prince	
Hong Kong	Jason Li Kwai Chiu	24	1.83 m (6 ft 0 in)	Hong Kong	
India	Lukanand Kshetrimayum	20	1.83 m (6 ft 0 in)	Manipur	
Indonesia	Jason Julius	25	1.74 m (5 ft 8 1/2 in)	Bandung	
Japan	Ryo Yatogo	25	1.77 m (5 ft 9 1/2 in)	Niigata	
Kazakhstan	Anatoly Anissimov	24	1.89 m (6 ft 2 1/2 in)	Astana	
South Korea	Cho Jae-young	29	1.75 m (5 ft 9 in)	Seoul	
Laos	Sengtavanh Chaleunphonh	23	1.85 m (6 ft 1 in)	Luang Prabang	
Malaysia	Roger Hugo Amandus	21	1.80 m (5 ft 11 in)	Sabah	
Mexico	Jorge Andrés Villegas	25	1.88 m (6 ft 2 in)	Mexico City	
Myanmar	San Thar	27	1.79 m (5 ft 10 1/2 in)	Pauktaw	
Nepal	Manash Kumar Rai	22	1.80 m (5 ft 11 in)	Kathmandu	
Netherlands	Iliya Shahedi	23	1.74 m (5 ft 8 1/2 in)	Amsterdam	
Nicaragua	Jonathan López	29	1.83 m (6 ft 0 in)	León	
Panama	Daniel Andrian Morán	22	1.84 m (6 ft 1/2 in)	Panama City	
Peru	Eleazar Moreno	29	1.74 m (5 ft 8 1/2 in)	Lima	
Philippines	Myron Jude Ordillano	25	1.85 m (6 ft 1 in)	Parañaque City	
Puerto Rico	Driel Souza	29	1.82 m (5 ft 11 1/2 in)	San Juan	
Sierra Leone	Almon Sall	27	1.84 m (6 ft 1/2 in)	Freetown	
Singapore	Sean Nicholas Sutiono	26	1.83 m (6 ft 0 in)	Singapore	
Spain	Juan Pablo Colías	25	1.91 m (6 ft 3 in)	Valladolid	
Sri Lanka	Pasan Weerasekara	23	1.76 m (5 ft 9 1/2 in)	Ganemulla	
Switzerland	Marcel Ignacio Riera	28	1.83 m (6 ft 0 in)	Neuchâtelois	
Taiwan	Jacob Hsiao	29	1.85 m (6 ft 1 in)	Taipei	
Thailand	Surasak Muangkaew	27	1.86 m (6 ft 1 in)	Lamphun	
United States	Daryn Alexander Friedman	23	1.83 m (6 ft 0 in)	Hollywood	
Venezuela	Orangel Dirinot	26	1.89 m (6 ft 2 1/2 in)	Coro	
