= Mister Venezuela 2014 =

11th Mister Venezuela pageant

- Date: May 24, 2014
- Presenters: Kerly Ruiz; Jessus Zambrano
- Entertainment: Omar Acedo
- Venue: Estudio 1 de Venevisión, Caracas, Venezuela
- Broadcaster: International: Univisión; Venevisión Plus; DirecTV; Official broadcaster: Venevisión
- Entrants: 12
- Placements: 5
- Winner: Jesús Casanova; Barinas
- Congeniality: Jonathan Negrón (Distrito Capital)
- Best Body: Carlos Aguiar (Distrito Capital)

Mister Venezuela 2014 was the 11th Mister Venezuela pageant. It was held at the Estudio 1 de Venevisión in Caracas, Venezuela on May 24, 2014.

At the end of the event, Jessus Zambrano of Táchira titled Jesús Casanova of Barinas as Mister Venezuela 2014. He represented Venezuela at the Mister World 2014 pageant.

The runner-up position went to Francisco Guerrero of Táchira.

== Background ==
After the 2006 edition, the Mister Venezuela pageant went on an eight-year hiatus, during which time two new winners were named.

The first was José Manuel Flores, Mister Venezuela 2009, who participated in Mister World 2010 pageant in Incheon, South Korea, placing in the Top 15. The second one was Jessus Zambrano, Mister Venezuela 2012, who participated in Mister World 2012 in Kent, England, UK.

== Pageant ==
=== Selection committee ===
The judges for Mister Venezuela include:

- Irma Contreras – Fashion designer
- Titina Penzini – Fashion designer, DJ and TV host
- Mara Montauti – Fashion designer
- María Milagros Véliz – Miss World Venezuela 2008
- María Antonieta Duque – Actress
- Gabriella Ferrari – Miss World Venezuela 2011
- Karen Soto – Miss World Venezuela 2013
- Osmariel Villalobos – Miss Earth Venezuela 2011, Miss Earth – Water 2012 and TV host

== Results ==
Color key

- Declared as winner
- Ended as runner-up
- Ended as top 5/8 qualification
- Ended as one of the finalists or semifinalists
- Ended as special awards winner

Placement	Contestant	International placement
Mister Venezuela 2014	Barinas (No. 12) – Jesús Casanova	Unplaced – Mister World 2014
1st runner-up	Táchira (No. 7) – Francisco Guerrero	
2nd runner-up	Zulia (No. 9) – Jesús Alvarado	3rd runner-up – Mister Grand International 2018
Top 5	Distrito Capital (No. 5) – Jonathan Negrón; Distrito Capital (No. 11) – Salvador Lugo	

=== Special awards ===
Award	Contestant
Best Body	Distrito Capital (No. 1) – Carlos Aguiar
Mister Congeniality	Distrito Capital (No. 5) – Jonathan Negrón

== Contestants ==
12 contestants competed for the title.

No.	Contestant	Age (Note: Ages at the time of the pageant)	Height	Hometown
1	Carlos Aguiar	25	1.93 m (6 ft 4 in)	Caracas
2	Luis José Castillo	23	1.89 m (6 ft 2 1/2 in)	Caracas
3	Gerald García	20	1.85 m (6 ft 1 in)	Caracas
4	Abraham Castellano	23	1.84 m (6 ft 1/2 in)	Maracaibo
5	Jonathan Negrón	26	1.86 m (6 ft 1 in)	Caracas
6	Ángelo Márquez	22	1.88 m (6 ft 2 in)	Caracas
7	Jesús Francisco Guerrero Apolinar	21	1.89 m (6 ft 2 1/2 in)	San Cristóbal
8	José Manuel Gómez	24	1.82 m (5 ft 11 1/2 in)	Porlamar
9	Jesús Alvarado (Jesús De Alva)	20	1.78 m (5 ft 10 in)	Maracaibo
10	Fabrizio Sassano	24	1.84 m (6 ft 1/2 in)	Valencia
11	Salvador Lugo	22	1.86 m (6 ft 1 in)	Caracas
12	Jesús Antonio Casanova Sarmiento	25	1.90 m (6 ft 3 in)	Barinas

Notes

- Jesús Casanova (No. 12) unplaced in Mister World 2014 in Torbay, England and then entered into politics.
- Jesús De Alva (No. 9) placed as 3rd runner-up in Mister Grand International 2018 in Yangon, Myanmar.
- Jesús De Alva (No. 9) became a TV host and Jesús Casanova (No. 12) entered into politics.
