= Mister Venezuela 2016 =

13th Mister Venezuela pageant

- Date: May 28, 2016
- Presenters: Kerly Ruiz; Fanny Otatti; Dave Capella
- Entertainment: Gabo Parisi; Pedro Alonso
- Venue: Estudio 1 de Venevisión, Caracas, Venezuela
- Broadcaster: International: Univisión; Venevisión Plus; DirecTV; Official broadcaster: Venevisión
- Entrants: 14
- Placements: 5
- Winner: Renato Barabino; Aragua
- Best Body: Raúl Ramírez (Táchira)
- Smile: Renato Barabino (Aragua)

Mister Venezuela 2016 was the 13th Mister Venezuela pageant. It was held at the Estudio 1 de Venevisión in Caracas, Venezuela on May 28, 2016.

At the end of the event, Gabriel Correa of Aragua titled Renato Barabino of Aragua as Mister Venezuela 2016. However, he was unable to represent Venezuela at the Mister World 2016 pageant due to ongoing crisis in Venezuela.

The runner-up position went to Walfred Crespo of Zulia.

== Pageant ==
=== Selection committee ===
The judges for Mister Venezuela include:

- Marycarmen Sobrino – Journalist and host
- Maydeliana Díaz – Top 10 in Miss Venezuela 2015 and Reina Internacional del Café 2016
- Mirla Castellanos – Singer
- Luisa Lucchi – Entrepreneur and designer
- María Alejanda Yáñez – Stylist
- Michelle Bertolini – Miss International Venezuela 2013
- Shirley Varnagy – Journalist
- Rosmeri Marval – Actress and model
- Andrea Rosales – Miss Earth Venezuela 2015 and Top 8 in Miss Earth 2015

== Results ==
Color key

- Declared as winner
- Ended as runner-up
- Ended as top 5/8 qualification
- Ended as one of the finalists or semifinalists
- Ended as special awards winner

Placement	Contestant	International placement
Mister Venezuela 2016	Aragua (No. 6) – Renato Barabino	Did not compete – Mister World 2016
1st runner-up	Zulia (No. 4) – Walfred Crespo	Top 16 – Mister International 2016
2nd runner-up	Distrito Capital (No. 2) – Gustavo Acevedo	Top 10 – Mister Supranational 2016
Top 5	Distrito Capital (No. 1) – Luis Segovia	
Top 5	Bolívar (No. 13) – Ignacio Milles	Top 10 – Mister International 2017

=== Manhunt International Venezuela 2022 ===
Placement	Contestant	International placement
Manhunt International Venezuela 2022	Distrito Capital (No. 14) – José Luis Trujillo	Top 16 – Manhunt International 2022

=== Special awards ===
Award	Contestant
Best Actor	Lara (No. 9) – Jordan Piña
Best Body	Táchira (No. 10) – Raúl Ramírez
Best Host	Lara (No. 9) – Jordan Piña
Best Look	Trujillo (No. 7) – Libio La Rovere
Best Singer	Guárico (No. 8) – Renzo La Posta
Best Smile	Aragua (No. 6) – Renato Barabino

== Contestants ==
14 contestants competed for the title.

#	Contestant	Age (Note: Ages at the time of the pageant)	Height	Hometown
1	Luis Alejando Segovia González	26	1.86 m (6 ft 1 in)	Caracas
2	Gustavo Alejandro Acevedo Nicolazzo	19	1.86 m (6 ft 1 in)	Caracas
3	Jesús Paúl Briceño Urdaneta	21	1.88 m (6 ft 2 in)	Maracaibo
4	Walfred José Crespo Urribarri	22	1.88 m (6 ft 2 in)	Cabimas
5	Andrés Antonio Báez Torres	21	1.84 m (6 ft 1/2 in)	Ciudad Ojeda
6	Renato Barabino Gandica	18	1.85 m (6 ft 1 in)	Maracay
7	Libio José La Rovere Omaña	23	1.80 m (5 ft 11 in)	Valera
8	Renzo Kevin La Posta Rengifo	23	1.78 m (5 ft 10 in)	San Rafael de Laya
9	Jordan Jesús Piña Mendoza	22	1.79 m (5 ft 10 1/2 in)	Carora
10	Raúl Ricardo Ramírez Ramírez	22	1.81 m (5 ft 11 1/2 in)	Táriba
11	Jean Pierre Arcila Harp	22	1.81 m (5 ft 11 1/2 in)	Coro
12	Miguel Lorenzo Ferrieri Pararia	22	1.82 m (5 ft 11 1/2 in)	Tucupido
13	Ignacio Eduardo Milles Dommar	25	1.88 m (6 ft 2 in)	Caracas
14	José Luis Trujillo Valecillos	20	1.92 m (6 ft 3 1/2 in)	Caracas

Notes

- Renato Barabino (No. 6) did not compete in Mister World 2016 in Southport, England.
- Walfred Crespo (No. 4) placed as Top 16 in Mister International 2016 in Bangkok, Thailand.
- Gustavo Acevedo (No. 2) placed as Top 10 in Mister Supranational 2016 in Krynica-Zdrój, Poland.
- Ignacio Milles (No. 13) placed as Top 10 in Mister International 2017 in Yangon, Myanmar.
- José Luis Trujillo (No. 14) placed as Top 16 in Manhunt International 2022 in Manila, Philippines.
