= Mister Venezuela 2024 =

16th Mister Venezuela pageant

- Date: July 13, 2024
- Presenters: Alejandra Conde; Jordan Mendoza
- Entertainment: Katherine Coll; Seco Cheers
- Venue: Estudio 1 de Venevisión, Caracas, Venezuela
- Broadcaster: International: Univisión; Ve Plus TV; DirecTV; Official broadcaster: Venevisión
- Entrants: 14
- Placements: 5
- Winner: Juan Alberto García; Carabobo
- Congeniality: Alexander Valbuena (Barinas)
- Photogenic: Franco Daniel Cova (Miranda)
- Best Body: Juan Alberto García (Carabobo)
- Etiquette: Mike Durán (Distrito Capital)

Mister Venezuela 2024 was the 16th Mister Venezuela pageant. It was held at the Estudio 1 de Venevisión in Caracas, Venezuela on July 13, 2024.

At the end of the event, Jorge Eduardo Nuñez of Zulia titled Juan Alberto García of Carabobo as Mister Venezuela 2024. He represented Venezuela at the Mister World 2024 pageant placing in the Top 10.

The runner-up position went to Franco Daniel Cova of Miranda.

== Pageant ==
=== Selection committee ===
The judges for Mister Venezuela include:

- Elaiza Gil – Actress
- Diana Silva – Miss Earth Venezuela 2018, Top 8 in Miss Earth 2018, Miss Venezuela 2022 and Top 10 in Miss Universe 2023
- Vanessa Peretti – Social activist, Miss International Venezuela 2006 and Top 15 in Miss International 2007
- Angélica Rivera – Fashion designer
- Robert Veiga – Businessman and digital marketing specialist
- Sandro Finoglio – Mister Venezuela 1997, 1st runner-up in Manhunt International 1997 and Mister World 1998
- Vito Gasparrini – Mister Venezuela 2006

== Results ==
Color key

- Declared as winner
- Ended as runner-up
- Ended as top 5/8 qualification
- Ended as one of the finalists or semifinalists
- Ended as special awards winner

Placement	Contestant	International placement
Mister Venezuela 2024	Carabobo (No. 9) – Juan Alberto García	Top 10 – Mister World 2024 (Mister World Americas)
1st runner-up	Miranda (No. 3) – Franco Daniel Cova	Winner – Caballero Universal 2025
2nd runner-up	Táchira (No. 14) – Leiker Márquez	
Top 5	Aragua (No. 11) – Nelson Rodríguez	
Top 5	Distrito Capital (No. 5) – Mike Durán	

=== Special awards ===
Award	Contestant
Best Body	Carabobo (No. 9) – Juan Alberto García
Best Look	Distrito Capital (No. 10) – Enrique Rivas
Best Smile	Nueva Esparta (No. 7) – Kenneth Bellorín
Best Face	Aragua (No. 12) – Dalberth Peña
Mister Congeniality	Barinas (No. 1) – Alexander Valbuena
Mister Photogenic	Miranda (No. 3) – Franco Daniel Cova
Mister Etiquette	Distrito Capital (No. 5) – Mike Durán
Mister Popularity	Distrito Capital (No. 6) – Winder Montaño

== Contestants ==
14 contestants competed for the title.

No.	Contestant	Age (Note: Ages at the time of the pageant)	Height	Hometown
1	Luis Alexander Valbuena Colmenares	25	1.80 m (5 ft 11 in)	Ciudad Bolivia
2	Gabriel Alejandro Torrealba Mendoza	20	1.87 m (6 ft 1 1/2 in)	Caracas
3	Franco Daniel Cova Reina	23	1.88 m (6 ft 2 in)	Cúa
4	Ramón Leonardo Betancourt León	25	1.89 m (6 ft 2 1/2 in)	Río Chico
5	Maiker (Mike) Oswaldo Durán Serrano	26	1.86 m (6 ft 1 in)	Caracas
6	Winder Jesús Montaño Manzanilla	27	1.88 m (6 ft 2 in)	Caracas
7	Kenneth Haniel Bellorín San Juan	24	1.92 m (6 ft 3 1/2 in)	Porlamar
8	Henry Alexander Mercadez Tiberio	26	1.93 m (6 ft 4 in)	Valencia
9	Juan Alberto García Caled	25	1.91 m (6 ft 3 in)	Valencia
10	Enrique Alejandro Rivas Moreno	24	1.90 m (6 ft 3 in)	Caracas
11	Nelson Jesús Rodríguez Herrera	23	1.92 m (6 ft 3 1/2 in)	Maracay
12	Dalberth Enrique Peña Correa	20	1.88 m (6 ft 2 in)	Cagua
13	Carlos Miguel Ledezma Blanco	25	1.83 m (6 ft 0 in)	Calabozo
14	Leiker Michell Márquez Mendoza	25	1.84 m (6 ft 1/2 in)	San Cristóbal

Notes

- Juan Alberto García (No. 9) placed in the Top 10 in Mister World 2024 in Phan Thiết, Bình Thuận, Vietnam.
