= Mister Venezuela =

National male beauty pageant competition in Venezuela

- Formation: July 17, 1996; 30 years ago
- Type: Beauty pageant
- Headquarters: Caracas
- Location: Venezuela
- Members: Mister World Manhunt International Mister International Mister Global Mister Supranational Man of the World
- Official language: Spanish
- Executive Committee: Jonathan Blum; Gabriela Isler; Jacqueline Aguilera; Nina Sicilia
- Key people: Gustavo Cisneros (Owner); Adriana Cisneros (CEO); Osmel Sousa; María Kallay
- Parent organization: Cisneros Group
- Website: missvenezuela.com

Mister Venezuela is an annual male pageant held in Venezuela. The winner and finalists from the contest go on to represent Venezuela in many international pageants. The Mister Venezuela pageant was started under the guardianship of Osmel Sousa and María Kallay with the intent of creating a male contest with the same discipline, quality and success as its female counterpart, Miss Venezuela.

The current Mister Venezuela is Juan Alberto García of Carabobo who was selected on July 13, 2024 at Venevisión Studios in Caracas, Venezuela.

== History ==
The first contest was held on July 17, 1996 and the winner was contestant number 20, José Gregorio Faría.

In the fifth edition, aired November 22, 2000, 26 men represented every state and region in Venezuela; they wore scarfs rather than the sashes used in female pageants. Due to political issues in 2002, the seventh pageant was postponed and held in 2003.

In 2012, during a private ceremony hosted by Osmel Sousa, the President of Mister and Miss Venezuela Organization; Jesús Zambrano was elected as the new Mister Venezuela 2012.

== Recent titleholders ==
The following men have been recently titled Mister Venezuela. The winner of Mister Venezuela traditionally competes at the Mister World pageant.

Year	State	Titleholder	Venue	Date	Entrants	Placement
2024	Carabobo (No. 9)	Juan Alberto García	Venevisión, Caracas	13 July 2024	14	Top 10 in Mister World 2024
2019	Zulia (No. 9)	Jorge Eduardo Núñez	Venevisión, Caracas	13 April 2019	14	Unplaced (Top 25) in Mister Supranational 2023
2019	Zulia (No. 9)	Jorge Eduardo Núñez	Venevisión, Caracas	13 April 2019	14	Top 29 in Mister World 2019
2017	Distrito Capital (No. 13)	Christian Nunes	Venevisión, Caracas	10 June 2017	14	Top 10 in Mister Global 2018
2017	Distrito Capital (No. 13)	Christian Nunes	Venevisión, Caracas	10 June 2017	14	Unplaced in Mister Universe 2015
2016	Aragua (No. 6)	Renato Barabino	Venevisión, Caracas	28 May 2016	14	Did not compete in Mister World 2016
2015	Aragua (No. 13)	Gabriel Correa	Venevisión, Caracas	23 May 2015	14	Mister Supranational 2017

== Venezuelan pageants ==
Year	Mister Venezuela (since 1996)	Miss & Mister Turismo Venezuela (since 2000) (Note: The Mister Turismo Venezuela title was awarded for the first time in 2002.)	Mister Handsome Venezuela (since 2004)	Señorita & Mister Deporte Venezuela (2006–2017) (Note: The Mister Deporte Venezuela title was awarded for the first time in 2010.)	Mister Universo Venezuela (since 2014)	Supranational Venezuela (since 2009) (Note: The Mister Supranational Venezuela title was awarded for the first time in 2016.) (Note: Since 2023, Supranational Venezuela is part of the Reinas y Reyes de Venezuela contest)	Caballero Venezuela (since 2019)
2025		24th June 25, 2025; José Chino Khan Theatre, Caracas					
2024	16th July 13, 2024; Venevisión Studios, Caracas	23rd July 7, 2024; National Theatre, Caracas	Cancelled	Cancelled	11th December 10, 2024; Teatro Luisela Díaz, Caracas	Cancelled	4th September 4, 2024; Designated via online, Caracas
2023	Cancelled	22nd August 23, 2023; Teatro Luisela Díaz, Caracas	Cancelled	Cancelled	10th November 15, 2023; Hermandad Gallega, Caracas	4th November 17, 2023; Poliedro de Caracas, Caracas	Cancelled
2022	Cancelled	21st July 26, 2022; National Theatre, Caracas	15h November 11, 2022; Teatro Luisela Díaz, Caracas	Cancelled	9th November 30, 2022; Hermandad Gallega, Caracas	3rd June 9, 2022; Teatro Junín, Caracas	3rd October 18, 2022; Casa del Artista, Caracas
2021	Cancelled	20th June 21, 2021; National Theatre, Caracas	14h October 30, 2021; Casa del Artista, Caracas	Cancelled	8th June 8, 2022; Hermandad Gallega, Caracas	2nd May 27, 2021; Globovisión Studios, Caracas	2nd September 29, 2021; Teatro Principal, Caracas
2020	Cancelled	Cancelled	Cancelled	Cancelled	7th August 19, 2021; Teatro Municipal de Chacao, Caracas	Cancelled	Cancelled
2019	15th April 13, 2019; Venevisión Studios, Caracas	19th August 28, 2019; Macaracuay Plaza, Caracas	13h December 16, 2019; Hotel Alba Caracas, Caracas	Cancelled	6th November 13, 2019; Hermandad Gallega, Caracas	1st August 22, 2019; Centro Cultural Chacao, Caracas	1st February 5, 2020; Caracas Military Circle, Caracas
2018	Cancelled	18th June 22, 2018; Hotel Eurobuilding, Caracas	12th November 30, 2018; Teatro Luisela Díaz, Caracas	Cancelled	5th November 14, 2018; Hermandad Gallega, Caracas	Designated	Founded 2019
2017	14th June 10, 2017; Venevisión Studios, Caracas	17th August 14, 2017; Hotel Eurobuilding, Caracas	11th December 22, 2017; Teatro Luisela Díaz, Caracas	12th November 27, 2017; Centro Comercial Tamanaco, Caracas	4th November 15, 2017; Hermandad Gallega, Caracas	Designated	Founded 2019
2016	13th May 28, 2016; Venevisión Studios, Caracas	16th August 2, 2016; Hotel Maruma, Maracaibo, Zulia	10th December 3, 2016; Place unknown, Caracas	11th December 15, 2016; Teatro Santa Fe, Caracas	3rd November 9, 2016; Hermandad Gallega, Caracas	Designated	Founded 2019
2015	12th May 23, 2015; Venevisión Studios, Caracas	15th August 11, 2015; Hotel Pestana, Caracas	Cancelled	10th November 12, 2015; Macaracuay Plaza, Caracas	2nd November 3, 2015; Hermandad Gallega, Caracas	Designated	Founded 2019
2014	11th May 24, 2014; Venevisión Studios, Caracas	14th September 2, 2014; Hotel Tamanaco, Caracas	Cancelled	9th November 7, 2014; Hotel Alba Caracas, Caracas	1st November 4, 2014; Hermandad Gallega, Caracas	Designated	Founded 2019
2013	Cancelled	13th July 30, 2013; Hotel Alba Caracas, Caracas	9th October 2, 2013; Hermandad Gallega, Caracas	8th November 15, 2013; Universidad Nueva Esparta, Caracas	Founded 2014	Designated	Founded 2019
2012	Designated	Cancelled	8th August 16, 2012; Hermandad Gallega, Caracas	7th September 13, 2012; Universidad Nueva Esparta, Caracas	Founded 2014	Designated	Founded 2019
2011	Cancelled	12th July 19, 2011; Universidad Santa María, Caracas	7th October 5, 2011; Hermandad Gallega, Caracas	6th November 16, 2011; Universidad Nueva Esparta, Caracas	Founded 2014	Designated	Founded 2019
2010	Cancelled	11th October 15, 2010; Universidad Santa María, Caracas	6th September 1, 2010; Caracas Military Circle, Caracas	5th October 13, 2010; Caracas Military Circle, Caracas	Founded 2014	Designated	Founded 2019
2009	Designated	10th July 7, 2009; Teatro Escena 8, Caracas	5th August 25, 2009; Caracas Military Circle, Caracas	4th November 9, 2009; Universidad Santa María, Caracas	Founded 2014	Designated	Founded 2019
2008	Cancelled	9th May 22, 2008; The Hotel, El Rosal, Caracas	4th August 12, 2008; Casa del Artista, Caracas	3rd July 31, 2008; Universidad Nueva Esparta, Caracas	Founded 2014	Founded 2009	Founded 2019
2007	Cancelled	8th 2007; Place unknown, Caracas	3rd September 21, 2007; Teatro Municipal, Caracas	2nd August 15, 2007; Place unknown, Caracas	Founded 2014	Founded 2009	Founded 2019
2006	10th September 23, 2006; Venevisión Studios, Caracas	7th December 7, 2006; Trasnocho Cultural, Caracas	2nd August 2, 2006; Quinta Esmeralda, Caracas	1st August 8, 2006; Place unknown, Caracas	Founded 2014	Founded 2009	Founded 2019
2005	9th June 18, 2005; Venevisión Studios, Caracas	6th October 11, 2005; Social Madeirense, San Diego	1st August 31, 2005; Hotel Eurobuilding, Caracas	Founded 2006	Founded 2014	Founded 2009	Founded 2019
2004	8th June 19, 2004; Venevisión Studios, Caracas	5th October 3, 2004; Asociación de Ejecutivos, Valencia	Designated	Founded 2006	Founded 2014	Founded 2009	Founded 2019
2003	7th July 26, 2003; Venevisión Studios, Caracas	4th June 8, 2003; Teatro Alfredo Célis Pérez, Naguanagua	Founded 2004	Founded 2006	Founded 2014	Founded 2009	Founded 2019
2002	Cancelled	3rd June 30, 2002; Place unknown, Valencia, Carabobo	Founded 2004	Founded 2006	Founded 2014	Founded 2009	Founded 2019
2001	6th November 6, 2001; Venevisión Studios, Caracas	2nd 2001; Place unknown, Valencia, Carabobo	Founded 2004	Founded 2006	Founded 2014	Founded 2009	Founded 2019
2000	5th November 21, 2000; Venevisión Studios, Caracas	1st October 2000; Place unknown, Valencia, Carabobo	Founded 2004	Founded 2006	Founded 2014	Founded 2009	Founded 2019
1999	4th November 4, 1999; Venevisión Studios, Caracas	Founded 2000	Founded 2004	Founded 2006	Founded 2014	Founded 2009	Founded 2019
1998	3rd October 29, 1998; Venevisión Studios, Caracas	Founded 2000	Founded 2004	Founded 2006	Founded 2014	Founded 2009	Founded 2019
1997	2nd April 8, 1997; Venevisión Studios, Caracas	Founded 2000	Founded 2004	Founded 2006	Founded 2014	Founded 2009	Founded 2019
1996	1st July 17, 1996; Venevisión Studios, Caracas	Founded 2000	Founded 2004	Founded 2006	Founded 2014	Founded 2009	Founded 2019

== Venezuelan titleholders ==
Year	Mister Venezuela (since 1996)	Mister Turismo Venezuela (since 2002)	Mister Handsome Venezuela (since 2004)	Mister Deporte Venezuela (since 2010)	Mister Universo Venezuela (since 2014)	Mister Supranational Venezuela (since 2016)	Caballero Venezuela (since 2019)
2025		Oliver Acosta; Sucre				Víctor Battista; Distrito Capital	Franco Daniel Cova; Miranda
2024	Juan Alberto García; Carabobo	José Ángel Flores; Portuguesa	Not awarded	Not awarded	Dorian Mendoza; Apure	Marcos De Freitas; Distrito Capital	César Ricardo Aguilar^{[α]} Portuguesa
2023	Not awarded	Joseph Daniel Pérez; Miranda	Not awarded	Not awarded	Eduardo Ramírez; Cojedes	Jorge Eduardo Núñez; Zulia	Not awarded
2022	Not awarded	Brayan Yllas; Distrito Capital	Carlos Rosales (Note: Resigned, replaced by first runner-up); Apure	Not awarded	Ricardo Navas; Lara	Anthony Gallardo; Distrito Capital	Gabriel Bastidas; Miranda
2022	Not awarded	Brayan Yllas; Distrito Capital	Fabián Morales (Note: Originally first runner-up, replaced original winner who resigned); Lara	Not awarded	Ricardo Navas; Lara	Anthony Gallardo; Distrito Capital	Gabriel Bastidas; Miranda
2021	Not awarded	Drexler Ustariz; La Guaira	Rafael Sánchez (Note: Dethroned, replaced by first runner-up); Lara	Not awarded	Jefferson Azzollini; Distrito Capital	William Badell; Zulia	Orangel Dirinot; Falcón
2021	Not awarded	Drexler Ustariz; La Guaira	Miguel Rodríguez (Note: Originally first-runner-up, replaced dethroned winner); Táchira	Not awarded	Jefferson Azzollini; Distrito Capital	William Badell; Zulia	Orangel Dirinot; Falcón
2020	Not awarded	Not awarded	Not awarded	Not awarded	Samir Gallardo; Amazonas	Not awarded	Not awarded
2019	Jorge Eduardo Núñez; Zulia	Herald Conner; Aragua	Jesús González; Carabobo	Not awarded	Jheison Mena; Carabobo	Leonardo Carrero^{[α]} Mérida	Luis Bermúdez; Guárico
2018	Not awarded	Juan Carlos Da Silva; Miranda	Alejandro Viloria; Distrito Capital	Not awarded	Luis Enrique Rodríguez; Bolívar	Jeudiel Condado^{[α]} Miranda	First awarded 2019
2017	Christian Nunes; Distrito Capital	Francesco Piscitelli; Aragua	Leonardo Carrero; Trujillo	Lionel Rodríguez^{[α]} Distrito Capital	Jaime Betancourt; Miranda	Gabriel Correa^{[α]} Aragua	First awarded 2019
2016	Renato Barabino; Aragua	Anderson Tovar; Vargas	Eugenio Díaz (Note: Resigned, no replacement); Municipio Libertador	Johinar Villamizar; Táchira	Jesús Zambrano; Táchira	Gustavo Acevedo^{[α]} Distrito Capital	First awarded 2019
2015	Gabriel Correa; Aragua	Carlos Arturo Pichardo; Lara	Not awarded	Abraham Álvarez; Táchira	Luis Domingo Báez; Delta Amacuro	First awarded 2016	First awarded 2019
2014	Jesús Casanova; Barinas	Francisco Gil; Táchira	Not awarded	Ángel David Rodríguez; Vargas	Christian Nunes; Sucre	First awarded 2016	First awarded 2019
2013	Not awarded	Hernán González; Táchira	José Luis Fernández; Distrito Capital	Walfred Crespo; Zulia	First awarded 2014	First awarded 2016	First awarded 2019
2012	Jessus Zambrano^{[α]} Táchira	Not awarded	Christian Rodríguez; Guárico	Luis Castillo; Zulia	First awarded 2014	First awarded 2016	First awarded 2019
2011	Not awarded	José Antonio Ampueda; Bolívar	Julio César Torres; Monagas	Jeyco Estaba; Nueva Esparta	First awarded 2014	First awarded 2016	First awarded 2019
2010	Not awarded	Henry Bolívar; Aragua	Juan Pablo Gómez; Nueva Esparta	Anderson Escalona^{[α]} Distrito Capital	First awarded 2014	First awarded 2016	First awarded 2019
2009	José Manuel Flores^{[α]} Distrito Capital	Luis Javier Cuencas; Lara	Édgar Moreno; Guárico	First awarded 2010	First awarded 2014	First awarded 2016	First awarded 2019
2008	Not awarded	Orlando Delgado; Distrito Capital	Héctor Manzano; Monagas	First awarded 2010	First awarded 2014	First awarded 2016	First awarded 2019
2007	Not awarded	Henry Licett; Anzoátegui	Will Viloria; Distrito Capital	First awarded 2010	First awarded 2014	First awarded 2016	First awarded 2019
2006	Vito Gasparrini; Distrito Capital	Germán González; Distrito Capital	Javier Delgado; Miranda	First awarded 2010	First awarded 2014	First awarded 2016	First awarded 2019
2005	José Ignacio Rodríguez; Zulia	Miguel Ángel Brito; Lara	Domenico Dell' Olio; Distrito Capital	First awarded 2010	First awarded 2014	First awarded 2016	First awarded 2019
2004	Francisco León; Amazonas	Jenisson Bonilla; Miranda	Juan Hilario Pérez^{[α]} Lara	First awarded 2010	First awarded 2014	First awarded 2016	First awarded 2019
2003	Andrés Mistage; Carabobo	Víctor Sánchez; Mérida	First awarded 2004	First awarded 2010	First awarded 2014	First awarded 2016	First awarded 2019
2002	Not awarded	Gustavo Granados; Sucre	First awarded 2004	First awarded 2010	First awarded 2014	First awarded 2016	First awarded 2019
2001	Daniel Navarrete; Vargas	First awarded 2002	First awarded 2004	First awarded 2010	First awarded 2014	First awarded 2016	First awarded 2019
2000	Luis Nery; Península Goajira	First awarded 2002	First awarded 2004	First awarded 2010	First awarded 2014	First awarded 2016	First awarded 2019
1999	Alejandro Otero; Distrito Federal	First awarded 2002	First awarded 2004	First awarded 2010	First awarded 2014	First awarded 2016	First awarded 2019
1998	Ernesto Calzadilla; Distrito Federal	First awarded 2002	First awarded 2004	First awarded 2010	First awarded 2014	First awarded 2016	First awarded 2019
1997	Sandro Finoglio; Distrito Federal	First awarded 2002	First awarded 2004	First awarded 2010	First awarded 2014	First awarded 2016	First awarded 2019
1996	José Gregorio Faría; Zulia	First awarded 2002	First awarded 2004	First awarded 2010	First awarded 2014	First awarded 2016	First awarded 2019

Notes

- ^α Designated.

== Venezuelan representatives ==
Color key

- Declared as winner
- Ended as runner-up
- Ended as top 5/8 qualification
- Ended as one of the finalists or semifinalists
- Ended as special awards winner

=== Major competitions ===
The following men have represented Venezuela in the Big Seven men's international beauty pageants.

==== Mister World ====
The winner of Mister Venezuela represents his country at Mister World. On occasion, when the contest is not taken place a designated contestant is selected or if the winner does not qualify (due to age) for either contest, a runner-up is sent.

Year	State	Mister Venezuela	National title	Placement at Mister World	Special Awards
2024	Carabobo	Juan Alberto García	Mister Venezuela 2024	Top 10	Mr World Americas; Mr. Top Model (Top 12); Best National Costume (Top 20)
2019	Zulia	Jorge Eduardo Núñez	Mister Venezuela 2019	Top 29	Mr. Top Model (Top 5)
2016	Aragua	Renato Barabino	Mister Venezuela 2016	Did not compete
2014	Barinas	Jesús Casanova	Mister Venezuela 2014	Unplaced	Mr. Extreme Sports (Top 10)
2012	Táchira (designated)	Jessus Zambrano	Mister Venezuela 2012	Unplaced	Mr. Talent (Top 10)
2010	Distrito Capital (designated)	José Manuel Flores	Mister Venezuela 2009	Top 15	Mr. Talent (Top 6); Mr. Top Model (Top 20)
2007	Distrito Capital	Vito Gasparrini	Mister Venezuela 2006	Unplaced
2003	Carabobo	Andrés Mistage	Mister Venezuela 2003	Top 10
2000	Distrito Federal	Alejandro Otero	Mister Venezuela 1999	Top 10
1998	Distrito Federal	Sandro Finoglio	Mister Venezuela 1997	Mister World 1998	Mr. Photogenic
1996	Zulia	José Gregorio Faría	Mister Venezuela 1996	Unplaced

==== Manhunt International ====
Since 2023, Manhunt Venezuela is chosen by Julio César Cruz, the National Director of Miss Earth Venezuela pageant. Prior to 2005, the winners or runners up from the Mister Venezuela pageant or would represent Venezuela at Manhunt International. The last representative sent by the Miss Venezuela Organization was in 2018.

Year	State	Manhunt Venezuela	National title	Placement at Manhunt International	Special Awards
2025	Distrito Capital	Sergio Gómez	Manhunt Venezuela 2025	Top 20
2024	Distrito Capital	Víctor Michele Battista Infante	Manhunt Venezuela 2024	3rd Runner-Up	Best Casting
Caballero Venezuela Organization
2022	Distrito Capital	José Luis Trujillo	Unplaced (contestant #14) in Mister Venezuela 2016	Top 16
Miss & Mister Turismo Venezuela Organization
2020	Did not compete
2018	Did not compete
2017	Vargas	Anderson Tovar (Note: Anderson José Tovar Suárez was selected to attend Manhunt International 2017, but did not finalize his participation.)	Mister Turismo Venezuela 2016	Did not compete
2016	Táchira	Francisco Gil	Mister Turismo Venezuela 2014	Top 16	Mr. Personality
Señorita & Mister Deporte Venezuela Organization
2012	Nueva Esparta	Jeyco Estaba	Mister Deporte Venezuela 2011	Top 15	Best National Costume (2nd Runner-Up)
Miss & Mister Turismo Venezuela Organization
2011	Bolívar	José Antonio Ampueda	Mister Turismo Venezuela 2011	Unplaced	Best National Costume (2nd Runner-Up)
2010	Aragua	Henry Bolívar	Mister Turismo Venezuela 2010	Top 16
2008	Distrito Capital	Orlando Delgado	Mister Turismo Venezuela 2008	Top 15
2007	Distrito Capital	Germán González	Mister Turismo Venezuela 2006	Unplaced	Manhunt América
2006	Lara	Miguel Ángel Brito	Mister Turismo Venezuela 2005	Top 15
Miss Venezuela Organization
2005	Anzoátegui	Claudio de la Torre	2nd Runner-Up in Mister Venezuela 2003	Top 15	Mr. Physique; Best National Costume
2002	Vargas	Daniel Navarrete	Mister Venezuela 2001	4th Runner-Up	Mr. Internet
2001	Península Goajira	Luis Nery	Mister Venezuela 2000	2nd Runner-Up
2000	Distrito Capital	José Gabriel Madonía	2nd Runner-Up in Mister Venezuela 1999	3rd Runner-Up	Best National Costume; Mr. Hunk
1999	Distrito Federal	Ernesto Calzadilla	Mister Venezuela 1998	Manhunt International 1999
1998		Jossman Peñalver		Unplaced
1997	Distrito Federal	Sandro Finoglio	Mister Venezuela 1997	1st Runner-Up	Best National Costume; Jockey Fitness Award
1995	Did not compete
1994	Did not compete
1993	Did not compete

==== Mister International (Thailand) ====
Since 2019, Miss Supranational Venezuela is chosen by Julio César Cruz, the National Director of Miss Earth Venezuela pageant. Prior to 2019, the runners up from the Miss Venezuela pageant or independent candidates would represent Venezuela at Miss Supranational. The last representative sent by the Miss Venezuela Organization was in 2018.

Year	State	Mister Internacional Venezuela	National title	Placement at Mister International	Special Awards
2025	Distrito Capital	Anthony Gallardo		Unplaced
2024	Distrito Capital	Enmanuel Jeremías Serrano Liscano	Mister International Venezuela 2024	Top 15
2023	Zulia	William Badell	Mister Supranational Venezuela 2021	1st runner-up
2022	Falcón	Orangel Dirinot	Caballero Venezuela 2021	2nd runner-up
2018	Aragua	Francesco Piscitelli	Mister Turismo Venezuela 2017; 3rd runner-up in Mister Supranational Venezuela 2021	1st runner-up	Best National Costume (9th runner-up)
2017	Distrito Capital	Ignacio Milles (Note: Elvis De Oliveira would be the initial representative in Mister Internacional 2017, who would be replaced by Luis Marrero. Although in the end, Ignacio Milles was the one who represented the country in said contest.)	Top 5 in Mister Venezuela 2016	Top 10
2016	Zulia	Walfred Crespo	Mister Deporte Venezuela 2013; 1st runner-up in Mister Venezuela 2016	Top 16
2015	Lara	Rafael Angelucci	1st runner-up in Mister Venezuela 2015	Top 10	Mr. Cosmetics; Best National Costume (2nd runner-up)
2014	Mérida	Yarnaldo Morales (Note: Yarnaldo Rey José Morales Tovar would attend Mister International 2014, however, due to lack of funds to cover his travel expenses to South Korea, he would withdraw from the competition. Morales would previously compete at Mister Universo World 2013 in Lima, Peru, taking second place as 'Virrey'.)	1st runner-up in Mister Turismo Venezuela 2013	Did not compete
2013	Apure	José Anmer Paredes	Mister International Venezuela 2013	Mister International 2013	Best Body
2012	Distrito Capital	Gary Pinha		Top 16
2011	Mérida	Jeefry Rojas	Mister Deporte Internacional Venezuela 2011	Top 10
2010		Francisco Sánchez		Top 15
2009	Península de Paraguaná	Luis Nuzzo	Top 10 in Mister Turismo Venezuela 2008 as Mister Monagas; Top 12 in Mister Handsome Venezuela 2009	Top 10	Mr. Congeniality
2008	Canaima	Marco Antonio Chinea	Top 12 in Mister Handsome Venezuela 2006	Top 10
2007	Distrito Capital	Alberto Augusto García	1st runner-up in Mister Handsome Venezuela 2006	3rd runner-up	Mr. Photogenic
2006	Miranda	Javier Delgado	Mister Handsome Venezuela 2006	1st runner-up

==== Mister Universe (Men Universe Model) ====
Since 2019, Miss Supranational Venezuela is chosen by Julio César Cruz, the National Director of Miss Earth Venezuela pageant. Prior to 2019, the runners up from the Miss Venezuela pageant or independent candidates would represent Venezuela at Miss Supranational. The last representative sent by the Miss Venezuela Organization was in 2018.

Venezuela
Year	State	Mister Universo Venezuela	National title	Placement at Mister Universe	Special Awards
2024	Zulia	Manuel Alejandro Polanco		Unplaced
Mister Universo Venezuela Organization
2019	Bolívar	Luis Enrique Rodríguez	Mister Universo Venezuela 2018	Top 15
2018	Miranda	Jaime Betancourt	Mister Universo Venezuela 2017	2nd Runner-Up
2017	Táchira	Jesús Zambrano	Mister Universo Venezuela 2016	Unplaced
2016	Delta Amacuro	Luis Domingo Báez	Mister Universo Venezuela 2015	1st Runner-Up	Best Body
2015	Sucre	Christian Nunes	Mister Universo Venezuela 2014; Mister Venezuela 2017	Top 13
Mister Handsome Venezuela Organization
2014	(Caracas) Distrito Capital	José Luis Fernández	Mister Handsome Venezuela 2013	1st Runner-Up
2013	Guárico	Christian Rodríguez	Mister Handsome Venezuela 2012	Top 12
2012	Monagas	Julio César Torres	Mister Handsome Venezuela 2011	4th Runner-Up	Mr. Photogenic
2011	Nueva Esparta	Juan Pablo Gómez	Mister Handsome Venezuela 2010	Mister Universe 2011	Mr. Internet
2010	Guárico	Édgar Moreno	Mister Handsome Venezuela 2009	3rd Runner-Up	Best Body
2009	Did not compete
2008	Cojedes	Julio Sánchez-Vega	Unplaced in Mister Handsome Venezuela 2006	Top 10	Best Body

Isla de Margarita
Year	State	Mister Universo Margarita	National title	Placement at Mister Universe	Special Awards
2019	Isla de Margarita	Carlos Guédez		Unplaced
2018	Isla de Margarita	Jesús Urdaneta		Top 12	Mr. Elegance
2017	Isla de Margarita	Douglas Castro		5th Runner-Up
2016	Isla de Margarita	Florentino Rodríguez		Unplaced
2015	Isla de Margarita	Mariano Palacios		Unplaced
2014	Isla de Margarita	Edward Rojas		Unplaced	Mr. Congeniality
2013	Isla de Margarita	Octavio Centeno		Unplaced
2012	Did not compete
2011	Isla de Margarita	Carlos Martínez		Unplaced
2010	Did not compete
2009	Did not compete
2008	Isla de Margarita	Francisco Diaz		Unplaced

==== Mister Global ====
Since 2019, Miss Supranational Venezuela is chosen by Julio César Cruz, the National Director of Miss Earth Venezuela pageant. Prior to 2019, the runners up from the Miss Venezuela pageant or independent candidates would represent Venezuela at Miss Supranational. The last representative sent by the Miss Venezuela Organization was in 2018.

Year	State	Mister Global Venezuela	National title	Placement at Mister Global	Special Awards
Caballero Venezuela Organization
2025	Zulia	William Badell		1st Runner-Up
2024	Distrito Capital	Sergio Andrés Gómez Suárez	Mister Global Venezuela 2024	Top 20
2023	Zulia	Daniel Olaves	1st Runner-Up in Mister Occidente 2022	Did not compete
2022	Did not compete
2021	Miranda	Juan Carlos Da Silva	Mister Turismo Venezuela 2018; Caballero Global Venezuela 2021	3rd Runner-Up	Best Charming Smile
2019		Orlando Delgado (Note: Orlando Ruíz Delgado represented Venezuela at Mister Grand Internacional 2018 but could not participate in Mister Global 2019.)		Did not compete
2018	(Caracas) Distrito Capital	Christian Nunes	Mister Universo Venezuela 2014; Mister Venezuela 2017	Top 10
2017	Did not compete
2016	Did not compete
2015	Nueva Esparta	Yuber Jiménez	Mister Deporte Plata Venezuela 2014	1st Runner-Up
2014	Did not compete

==== Mister Supranational ====
Since 2019, Mister Supranational Venezuela is chosen by Julio César Cruz, the National Director of Supranational Venezuela pageant. Prior to 2019, the runners up from the Mister Venezuela pageant or independent candidates would represent Venezuela at the Mister Supranational competition. The last representative sent by the Miss Venezuela Organization was in 2018.

Year	State	Mister Supranational Venezuela	National title	Placement at Mister Supranational	Special Awards
Miss Supranational Venezuela Organization
2026	(Caracas) Distrito Capital	Juan Carlos da Silva	Mister Supranational Venezuela 2026	Top 20
2025	(Caracas) Distrito Capital	Víctor Michele Battista Infante	Mister Supranational Venezuela 2025	Top 10	Mister Supranational Americas
2024	(Caracas) Distrito Capital	Marcos Jesús De Freitas Andrade	Mister Supranational Venezuela 2024	3rd Runner-Up	Supra Chat (Top 7); Supra Model of the Year (Top 11)
2023	Zulia	Jorge Eduardo Núñez	Mister Supranational Venezuela 2022	Unplaced	21st place (Top 25)
2022	(Caracas) Distrito Capital (designated)	Anthony Gallardo	1st Runner-up in Mister Supranational Venezuela 2022	Top 20
2021	Zulia	William Badell	Mister Supranational Venezuela 2021	2nd Runner-Up	Mr. Photogenic; Mr. Supra-Chat Cahllenge (Top 5); Top Model (Top 11)
2019	Mérida	Leonardo Carrero	Mister Handsome Venezuela 2017 as Mister Trujillo; 1st Runner-up in Mister Venezuela 2019; Mister Supranational Venezuela 2019	4th Runner-Up
Miss Venezuela Organization
2018	Miranda	Jeudiel Condado	Mister Universo World Venezuela 2014; Unplaced (contestant #3) in Mister Venezuela 2015	Unplaced
2017	Aragua	Gabriel Correa	Mister Venezuela 2015	Mister Supranational 2017
2016	(Caracas) Distrito Capital	Gustavo Acevedo	2nd Runner-Up in Mister Venezuela 2016	Top 10

==== Man of the World ====
Since 2019, Miss Supranational Venezuela is chosen by Julio César Cruz, the National Director of Miss Earth Venezuela pageant. Prior to 2019, the runners up from the Miss Venezuela pageant or independent candidates would represent Venezuela at Miss Supranational. The last representative sent by the Miss Venezuela Organization was in 2018.

Year	State	Man of Venezuela	National title	Placement at Man of the World	Special Awards
2026	Zulia	Manuel Alejandro Polanco		Withdrew
2025	Distrito Capital	Marcos Palacios		Unplaced	(bronze) Best Physique
2024	Distrito Capital	Sergio Azuaga		Man of the World 2024	(gold) Best in Swimwear; (gold) Press Favorite
2023	Distrito Capital	Omar Riera	Unplaced (contestant #4) in Mister Venezuela 2017; 4th Runner-up in Mister Supranational Venezuela 2022	Top 17	(bronze) Mister Congeniality; (bronze) Best Physique; (bronze) Press Favorite
2022	Distrito Capital	César Leonardo Urbaneja		Did not compete
2019	Did not compete
2018	Did not compete
2017	Did not compete

=== Minor competitions ===
==== Best Model of the World ====
Since 2019, Miss Supranational Venezuela is chosen by Julio César Cruz, the National Director of Miss Earth Venezuela pageant. Prior to 2019, the runners up from the Miss Venezuela pageant or independent candidates would represent Venezuela at Miss Supranational. The last representative sent by the Miss Venezuela Organization was in 2018.

Year	State	Best Model of Venezuela	National title	Placement at Best Model of the World	Special Awards
2022	Did not compete
2021	Did not compete
2019	Did not compete
2018	Did not compete
2017		Miguel Ángel Cascarano		Unplaced	Best Face; Best Friendship
2016	Did not compete
2015	Did not compete
2014	Did not compete
2013		Carlos Briceño; Bronson Rodríguez (Margarita Island)		Did not compete
2012		Robincal Fajardo		Unplaced	Best Catwalk; Best National Costume
2011		Jorge Rivera		Unplaced
2010		Diego José del Carmen Luis Rosas		Top 5 (3rd Runner-Up)	Best Photomodel
2010		Anderson Escalona		Unplaced	Best Catwalk; Best Model of Latin America
2010		Alberto Anderson (Bolivarian Republic of Venezuela); Leandro Ascanio (Los Roques); Angelo Dente (Margarita Island)		Unplaced
2009		Samuel Williams Pacheco Torres; Edgar Oswaldo Anzola Díaz (Los Roques); Alejandro Vera (Margarita Island)		Unplaced
2008		Johnatan Raúl Power Bolívar		Unplaced
2007		Irving Rodríguez		Unplaced
2006		Daniel Martínez Campos Ramos		Unplaced
2005	Unknown
2004	Unknown
2003	Did not compete
2002		Johan Hernández Casado		Unplaced
2001		David Yáñez Estévez		Unplaced
2000	Did not compete
1999		Edwin García		Unplaced
1998	Did not compete
1997	Did not compete
1996	Did not compete
1995	Did not compete

==== Mister Handsome International ====
Since 2019, Miss Supranational Venezuela is chosen by Julio César Cruz, the National Director of Miss Earth Venezuela pageant. Prior to 2019, the runners up from the Miss Venezuela pageant or independent candidates would represent Venezuela at Miss Supranational. The last representative sent by the Miss Venezuela Organization was in 2018.

Year	State	Mister Handsome Venezuela	National title	Placement at Mister Handsome International	Special Awards
Mister Universo Venezuela Organization
2022	Táchira (succeeded)	Miguel Rodríguez	Mister Handsome Venezuela 2021	2nd Runner-Up	Mister Apolo Internacional 2022; Best National Costume; Mr. Photogenic; Mr. Talent
2019	Miranda	Gregory Perdomo	Mister Universo Internacional Venezuela 2018	1st Runner-Up	Mister Adonis Internacional 2019
2018	Yaracuy	Gustavo Vallenilla	Unplaced in Mister Universo Venezuela 2017	2nd Runner-Up	Mister Apolo Internacional 2018
2018	Amazonas	Eric Ojeda	Mister Universo World Venezuela 2016	Mister Handsome International 2018
2017	Mérida	Alejandro Larez	3rd Runner-Up in Mister Universo Venezuela 2016	2nd Runner-Up	Mister Adonis Internacional 2017
2016	Did not compete
2015	Guárico (succeeded)	Francesco Alecci	Mister Universo Internacional Venezuela 2014	1st Runner-Up	Mister Good Looking Man of the World 2015
Mister Handsome Venezuela Organization
2014	Zulia	Guillermo Piñeiro	Mister Handsome Internacional Venezuela 2013	1st Runner-Up	Mister Adonis Internacional 2014
2013		Juan José Guzmán		1st Runner-Up
2012		Alexander González		Unplaced
2011		Zeus Rodríguez		Unplaced
2010	(Caracas) Municipio Libertador	Carlos Del Gallego	3rd Runner-Up in Mister Handsome Venezuela 2010	Mister Handsome International 2010
2009	Monagas	Héctor Manzano	Mister Handsome Venezuela 2008	2nd Runner-Up
2008	Dependencias Federales	Ángel Díaz	2nd Runner-Up in Mister Handsome Venezuela 2007	1st Runner-Up
2007	Distrito Capital	Will Viloria	Mister Handsome Venezuela 2007	Mister Handsome International 2007
2006	Did not compete
2005	Distrito Capital	Domenico Dell' Olio	Mister Handsome Venezuela 2005	4th Runner-Up
2004	Lara (designated)	Juan Hilario Pérez	Unplaced in Mister Venezuela 2004 as Mister Zulia; Mister Handsome Venezuela 2004	Mister Handsome International 2004
Independent franchises
2003	Did not compete
2002	Isla de Margarita	Alberto Bachour	Unplaced in Mister Venezuela 2003 as Mister Vargas	Mister Handsome International 2002 (Note: Alberto Bachour renounced the title of Mister Handsome International 2002. However, his classification is counted.)
2000	Trujillo	Luis Alexander Castellanos	2nd Runner-Up (Top 5) in Mister Venezuela 1997	Mister Tourism International
2000		Fernando Lovoi			Face of the Year
1999	Isla de Coche	Emilio Navas	Unplaced (contestant #9) in Mister Venezuela 1998	Mister Handsome International 1999
1998	Did not compete

==== Mr. Gay World ====
Since 2019, Miss Supranational Venezuela is chosen by Julio César Cruz, the National Director of Miss Earth Venezuela pageant. Prior to 2019, the runners up from the Miss Venezuela pageant or independent candidates would represent Venezuela at Miss Supranational. The last representative sent by the Miss Venezuela Organization was in 2018.

Year	State	Mister Gay Venezuela	National title	Placement at Mister Gay World	Special Awards
2022	Did not compete
2021	Did not compete
2020	Did not compete
2019		Walter Moreno		Unplaced
2018	Did not compete
2017		Alberto José Rodríguez Rengifo		Unplaced
2016		José Daniel García Durán		Top 12	Sports Challenge
2015	Did not compete
2014		Luis J. Vento		Top 5 (3rd Runner-Up)
2013	Did not compete
2012		Jhon Williams González		Withdrawal
2011	Did not compete
2010	Did not compete
2009		Juan José Bracho	1st Runner-Up in Mr. Gay Venezuela 2008	Unplaced

==== Mister Model International ====
Since 2019, Miss Supranational Venezuela is chosen by Julio César Cruz, the National Director of Miss Earth Venezuela pageant. Prior to 2019, the runners up from the Miss Venezuela pageant or independent candidates would represent Venezuela at Miss Supranational. The last representative sent by the Miss Venezuela Organization was in 2018.

Venezuela
Year	State	Mister Model Venezuela	National title	Placement at Mister Model International	Special Awards
Señorita & Mister Deporte Venezuela Organization
2025		Alejandro Guerra		1st Runner-Up	Best Role Model
2024	Zulia	Yosmar González	Unplaced in Mister Venezuela 2019	Unplaced
2021	Did not compete
2019		Nicolz Márquez (Note: Designated.)		Did not compete
2018	Distrito Capital	Lionel Rodríguez	Mister Deporte Venezuela 2017	Unplaced
2016	Aragua	Gabriel Espitia	2nd Runner-Up in Mister Deporte Venezuela 2015	Unplaced	Mister Photogenic
2015	Vargas	Ángel David Rodríguez	Mister Deporte Venezuela 2014	Top 13
2014	Zulia	Luis Castillo	Mister Deporte Venezuela 2012	Withdrawal
2013	Nueva Esparta	Nicolás Flores	Mister Deporte Internacional Venezuela 2012	Unplaced

Isla de Margarita
Year	State	Mister Model Margarita Island	National title	Placement at Mister Model International	Special Awards
Señorita & Mister Deporte Venezuela Organization
2025	Isla de Margarita	Omar Betancourt		Unplaced

==== Mister Universe International ====
Year	State	Mister Universe International Venezuela	National title	Placement at Mister Universe International	Special Awards
2024		Frank Primera	Mister Universe Venezuela 2024	4th Runner-Up
2023		Rubén López Madrid	Mister Hispanoamérica 2022	Unplaced
2022	Amazonas	Samir Gallardo	Mister Universo Venezuela 2020	1st Runner-Up	Mr. Social Media
2021		Carlos Guzmán		Did not compete
2019	Did not compete
2016	Did not compete
Mister Universe Centroamérica
2015	Did not compete

==== Mister Grand International (Brazil version) ====
Since 2019, Miss Supranational Venezuela is chosen by Julio César Cruz, the National Director of Miss Earth Venezuela pageant. Prior to 2019, the runners up from the Miss Venezuela pageant or independent candidates would represent Venezuela at Miss Supranational. The last representative sent by the Miss Venezuela Organization was in 2018.

Year	State	Mister Grand Venezuela	National title	Placement at Grand International	Special Awards
2022	Did not compete
2019		Heber Blanco González		Unplaced
2018		Alejandro Contreras		2nd Runner-Up
2018		Juan Feliciano Salazar (Teen)		Mister Teen Grand International 2018	Best Body Teen
2017		Richard Alexander Castillo; Bryan Eduardo (Teen)		Did not compete
2016		Francisco Ippoliti		Did not compete

==== Mister Tourism World ====
Since 2019, Miss Supranational Venezuela is chosen by Julio César Cruz, the National Director of Miss Earth Venezuela pageant. Prior to 2019, the runners up from the Miss Venezuela pageant or independent candidates would represent Venezuela at Miss Supranational. The last representative sent by the Miss Venezuela Organization was in 2018.

Year	State	Mister Turismo Venezuela	National title	Placement at Mister Tourism World	Special Awards
2025	Portuguesa	José Ángel Flores	Mister Turismo Venezuela 2024	3rd Runner-Up	Mr. Tourism Americas; Best in Formal Wear
2023	Miranda	Joseph Daniel Pérez	Mister Turismo Venezuela 2023	4th Runner-Up
2022	Trujillo	Acazio Peña	Mister Handsome International Venezuela 2022	Top 17
2021	La Guaira	Drexler Ustariz	Mister Turismo Venezuela 2021	Top 10
2019	Aragua	Herald Conner	Mister Turismo Venezuela 2019	Top 8	Multimedia Award (Winner)
2018	Did not compete
2017	Did not compete
2016	Did not compete

==== Mister Grand International (Filipino version) ====
Since 2019, Miss Supranational Venezuela is chosen by Julio César Cruz, the National Director of Miss Earth Venezuela pageant. Prior to 2019, the runners up from the Miss Venezuela pageant or independent candidates would represent Venezuela at Miss Supranational. The last representative sent by the Miss Venezuela Organization was in 2018.

Year	State	Mister Grand Venezuela	National title	Placement at Mister Grand International	Special Awards
2023		Jesús Alejandro Rincón Flores		Top 12	Top Model (4th Runner-Up); Best National Costume; Tourism Culture & Arts (Top 5)
2022	Mérida	Luis Eduardo Jaimes; José Infante	1st Runner-Up in Mister Young Venezuela 2022	Did not compete
2021	Aragua	Steven Aponte	Unplaced in Mister Handsome Venezuela 2019; Top 8 in Mister Supranational Venezuela 2022	Top 10
2019	Did not compete
2018 (Note: Edition celebrated in CBC Ballroom, Yangon, Myanmar on December 7, 2018.)	Zulia	Jesús De Alva	2nd Runner-Up in Mister Venezuela 2014	3rd Runner-Up	Mr. Congeniality
2018 (Note: Edition celebrated in Legazpi, Albay, Philippines on September 28, 2018.)		Orlando Ruiz		Top 10	Mr. Grand Americas
2017		César Leonardo Urbaneja		Did not compete

==== Mister National Universe ====
Venezuela debuted in 2024.

Year	State	Mister National Venezuela	National title	Placement at Mister National Universe	Special Awards
2024		Gui Souza		Unplaced	Mister Congeniality
Venezuela did not compete between 2017–2019; 2022–2023

==== Mister Universe Tourism ====
Venezuela has never competed.

Year	State	Mister Universe Tourism Venezuela	National title	Placement at Mister Universe Tourism	Special Awards
Venezuela did not compete between 2017–2019; 2023–2024

==== Caballero Universal ====
Since 2019, Miss Supranational Venezuela is chosen by Julio César Cruz, the National Director of Miss Earth Venezuela pageant. Prior to 2019, the runners up from the Miss Venezuela pageant or independent candidates would represent Venezuela at Miss Supranational. The last representative sent by the Miss Venezuela Organization was in 2018.

Year	State	Caballero Venezuela	National title	Placement at Caballero Universal	Special Awards
2025	Miranda	Franco Daniel Cova	Caballero Venezuela 2025	Caballero Universal
2024	Portuguesa	César Ricardo Aguilar	Caballero Venezuela 2024	Virrey (2nd-place finisher)
2023	Miranda	Gabriel Bastidas	Caballero Venezuela 2022	2nd Prince (4th-place finisher)	Mr. Interactive
2022	Lara	Joseph Daniel Pérez	Men Super Model Venezuela 2021	Withdrawal
2021	Guárico	Luis Bermúdez	Caballero Venezuela 2019	Virrey (2nd-place finisher)

==== Mr. Earth International ====
Since 2019, Miss Supranational Venezuela is chosen by Julio César Cruz, the National Director of Miss Earth Venezuela pageant. Prior to 2019, the runners up from the Miss Venezuela pageant or independent candidates would represent Venezuela at Miss Supranational. The last representative sent by the Miss Venezuela Organization was in 2018.

Year	State	Mr. Earth Venezuela	National title	Placement at Mr. Earth International	Special Awards
2023	Aragua	Steven Aponte		2nd Runner-Up (Mr. Air)	Best Catwalk

==== Mister International (Philippines) ====
Venezuela debuted in 2024.

Year	State	The Mister International Venezuela	National title	Placement at The Mister International	Special Awards
2024		Acasio Peña (Note: Acasio Peña replaced Simón Antonio Oria and Manuel Díaz)		Top 16
Venezuela did not compete in 2023

=== Discontinued competitions ===
==== International Male Model ====
Pageant active since 1998 until 2005.

Year	State	International Male Model Venezuela	National title	Placement at International Male Model	Special Awards
2005	Unknown
2003	Dependencias Federales	Richard De Stefano (Note: Competed as an Italian representative.)	Top 10 in Mister Venezuela 2003	International Male Model 2003
2002	Did not compete
2001	Carabobo	Deive Garcés	Top 10 in Mister Venezuela 2000	International Male Model 2001
2000	Distrito Capital	Diego Ochoa	4th Runner-Up (Top 5) in Mister Venezuela 1998	2nd Runner-Up	Mr. Talent
2000	Zulia	Juan Carlos Tarazona	Unplaced (contestant #21) in Mister Venezuela 1999
1999		Roberto Rondón	Unplaced (contestant #17) in Mister Venezuela 1996	International Male Model 1999
1998	Did not compete

==== Mister Intercontinental ====
Pageant active since 1998 until 2002.

Year	State	Mister Intercontinental Venezuela	National title	Placement at Mister Intercontinental	Special Awards
2002	Carabobo	Enrique Cuevas	1st Runner-Up in Mister Venezuela 2001	Mister Intercontinental 2002
2002	Isla de Margarita	Marco Navas		Top 12
2001	Delta Amacuro	César Suárez	2nd Runner-Up in Mister Venezuela 2001	2nd Runner-Up	Mr. Talent
2000		Édgar Rodríguez		Mister Intercontinental 2000
1999	Did not compete
1998	Did not compete

==== Grasim Mr. International ====
Pageant active since 1998 until 2003.

Year	State	Grasim Mr. International Venezuela	National title	Placement at Grasim Mr. International	Special Awards
2003	Carabobo	Jenisson Johanly Bonilla Valera	Mister Turismo Venezuela 2004	Unplaced	Best National Costume (2nd place)
2003	Isla de Margarita	Efraín Vera		Top 7
2002	Cojedes	Julio Cabrera	Unplaced in Mister Venezuela 2001	1st Runner-Up	Best Physique
2001	Guárico	Aníbal Martignani	2nd Runner-Up in Mister Venezuela 2000	1st Runner-Up	Best Smile
2000	Miranda	Ezzio Cavallaro	1st Runner-Up in Mister Venezuela 1999	Top 6 (3rd Runner-Up)	Best Physique (2nd place)
1999	Zulia	Nadir Nery	2nd Runner-Up in Mister Venezuela 1998	Grasim Mr. International 1999	Best National Costume; Mr. Physique (2nd place)
1998	Trujillo	Luis Alexander Castellanos	2nd Runner-Up (Top 5) in Mister Venezuela 1997	Top 6 (3rd Runner-Up)	Mr. Talent

==== Mister Tourism International ====
Pageant active since 2001 until 2015.

Year	State	Mister Tourism Venezuela	National title	Placement at Mister Tourism International	Special Awards
2015	Isla de Margarita	Juan Manuel García		Unplaced
2015		Francisco Antonio Gil		Top 5	Best National Costume; Best International Model
2014	Isla de Margarita	Omar Alejandro Cáceres Bastidas		Unplaced
2014		Hernán Jesús González Luzardo		2nd Runner-Up	Best National Costume (3rd place); Best Catwalk
2013		José Perdomo Villalobos		Top 7	Best Public Speaking (2nd place)
2012	Isla de Margarita	Carlos Alberto Olivares		Top 7	Best Speech
2012		Rever Steven Núñez Weffer		Unplaced	Mr. Photogenic
2010	Caracas	Martín Alejandro López Cabrera		Top 9
2010	Isla de Margarita	José Antonio Maldonado		Unplaced
2010	Valencia	Augusto Andrés Ducroxx		Unplaced
2002	Sucre	Gustavo Enrique Granados Sarmiento	Mister Turismo Venezuela 2002	2nd Runner-Up
2002	Isla de Margarita	Juan Luis Uraga Romano		Top 10
2001	Carabobo	Hugo Zafra	Unplaced (contestant #14) in Mister Venezuela 1999	Unplaced	Mr. Fitness

==== Mister Real Universe ====
Pageant active only in 2015.

Year	State	Mister Real Universe Venezuela	National title	Placement at Mister Real Universe	Special Awards
2015		Jesús Alejandro Rodríguez Torres		Top 13
2015		Robert León (Teen)		Unplaced

==== Mister Universal Ambassador ====
Pageant active since 2015 until 2019.

Year	State	Mister Universal Ambassador Venezuela	National title	Placement at Mister Universal Ambassador	Special Awards
2017		José Asprilla		Did not compete
2016		Christian López		Did not compete

=== Occasional competitions ===
The following are occasional competitions in which Venezuela has participated:

Occasional competitions
List
- Alexander Delgado – 1st runner-up in Mister Glam International 2023 (Mister Elegance; Best in Formal Wear)
- Joseph Zamora – 3rd runner-up in Mister Latinoamérica International 2023
- Jean Pierre Martínez – Mister Sea Universe 2023
- Franko Pérez – Mister Universo Model Mediterráneo Global 2023
- Armando José Jiménez – Top 20 in Mister Globe 2021
- Leonel Ortega – Mister International Model Mediterráneo Global 2021
- Gregory Perdomo – Mister Adonis Internacional 2019
- Jesús Bermúdez – Mister Copper Sea World 2019
- Jesús Bermúdez – Mister Costa Internacional 2019
- Martín Ferreira – Mister Summer Sea World 2019
- Andrés Esteban Pérez – 3rd runner-up in Man of the Year 2018 (Young Star Model; Bronze medalist in Best Prince Award; Best Charm, Most Handsome Man)
- Gustavo Vallenilla – Mister Apolo Internacional 2018
- Orlando Ruiz – Mister Grand Americas 2018
- Anthony Useche – Mister Petite Sea World 2018
- Juan Feliciano Salazar – Mister Teen Grand Internacional 2018
- Juan Carlos da Silva – Mister Young International 2018
- Franco Zirith – Best Male Model World 2017
- Alejandro Lárez – Mister Adonis Internacional 2017
- Orlado Ruiz – Mister de las Américas 2017
- Robert León Amundaray – Mister Fitness Model Look 2017
- Wladimir Alvarado – 1t runner-up in Mister Golden Universe 2017
- Alfonso Colmenares – Mister Hispanoamérica Internacional 2017
- Gelison Lara – Mister Iberoamérica Internacional 2017
- Richard Chirino – Unplaaced in Mister Model Universe 2017
- Robert Amundaray – Mister Models Tourism Universe 2017
- Ronald Freddy Mayorga Peixoto – Unplaced in Mister Ocean 2017
- Christian López – Unplaced in Mister Pacific World 2017
- Josseph Birriel – Mister Turismo Belleza Mundial 2017
- Eric Ojeda – Mister Tourism Intercontinental 2017
- Robert León Amundaray – Mister Turismo Model 2017
- Desimir Collic – Mister Continents International 2016
- Elvis De Oliveira – Mister Modelo Latinoamericano 2016
- Leonel Zambrano – Mister Teen World 2016
- Francisco Gil – Best International Model 2015
- Víctor Serra – Male Top Model of the Year Intercontinental 2015
- Francesco Alecci – Mister Good Looking Man of the World 2015
- Francesco Alecci – Mister Man of the World 2015
- Jheisson Grillo – Mister Teen Hispano Internacional 2015
- Marcel Márquez – Mister Teen of the Universe 2015
- Víctor Serra – Mr. Turismo Intercontinental 2015
- Freddy Rafael Behrens – Male Top Model of the Year Intercontinental 2014
- Guillermo Piñeiro – Mister Adonis Internacional 2014
- Abdul Atrache – Mister Mesoamérica Universo 2014
- Jack Leal – Mister Pacific World 2014
- Richard Yuncosa – Mister Teen Sea Universe 2014
- Freddy Rafael Behrens – Mr. Turismo Intercontinental 2014
- Gustavo Olivero – Top Model of Riviera Maya 2014
- Guillermo Caldera – Mr. Latin Model 2013
- Daniel Orta – Mister Playa International 2013
- Emilio Hernández – Mister Continentes del Mundo 2012
- Guillermo Caldera – Mr. Latin Model Internacional 2012
- Ricardo Vivas – Mister Continente del Mundo 2011
- Henrry Bolívar – Mister Sea World 2011
- Gerald García – Mister Teen Universe 2011
- Aníbal Dao – Mister Turismo Latino Internacional 2011
- Nelson Vidal – Mister Young Earth Worldwide 2011
- Jorge Rivera Delsi – Mister Young International 2011
- José Anmer Paredes – CN Models International Search 2010
- Stalin Ochoa – Mister Intercontinente 2010
- Ricardo Danilo García Villegas – Mister Young International 2010
- Ricardo Vicas – Mr. Teen Continentes del Mundo 2010
- Jhonny Jabbour – Mister Turismo de las Américas 2009
- Humberto Nunes – Mister Fashion Beauty Universal 2008
- Jonathan Negrón (Distrito Capital - #5) (Top 5 in Mister Venezuela 2014) – Mister Gentleman 2008
- Henry Licett – Mister Turismo de las Américas 2008
- Miguel Matute – Mister Turismo Internacional 2008
- Jean Pierre Di Crestanziano – Mister Young International 2008
- Jonathan Negrón (Distrito Capital - #5) (Top 5 in Mister Venezuela 2014) – Mister Young International 2008
- Víctor Santa María – Mister Continentes del Universo 2007
- Henry Licett – Mister Tourism Expoworld 2007
- Alberto García Barza – Mister World Model 2007
- Andrés Rosales – Mister Young International 2007
- José León – Mister Belleza Latina 2006
- Enyerberth Gresmaldi – Mister Teen World 2006
- Gerardo Muñoz – Mister Tourism Intercontinental 2006
- Marcos López; Moisés Campos – Mister Turismo de las Américas 2006
- Alberto García – Mister World Model 2006
- Jimmy Maldonado – Mr. Latino International 2006
- Marco Osorio – Mister Hawaiian Tropic International 2004
- Juan Nazco Olmos – Mister Model Universe 2004
- Alfonso Guerrero Brito – Mister Tourism Universe 2004
- Kinam Masoud (assumed) – Mister Young International 2004
- Omar Matute – Mr. Latino International 2004
- Eleazar González – Mister Young International 2003
- Paul Odreman (Isla de Margarita) – Unplaced in Mr. Handsome International 2003 (Mr. Elegance)
- Víctor Aguilar (Guayana) – Unplaced in Mr. Handsome International 2003 (Mr. Popularity)
- Franconero Silva (Amazonas) (Unplaced in Mister Venezuela 2001) – 1st Runner-Up in Modelo Revelación Internacional 2002
- Hernesto Boscán – 2nd Runner-Up in Mr. Handsome World 2002
- Miguel Ángel Fernández – 1st Runner-Up in Mr. Continents 2002
- José Gabriel Madonía (Distrito Federal - #11) (2nd Runner-Up in Mister Venezuela 1999) – Mr. American Continent 2000
- Johnny Álvarez Díaz (Cojedes) (Unplaced in Mister Venezuela 2000) – Semifinalist in Mr. American Continent 2000
- Tony Ferreira (Portuguesa) (Unplaced in Mister Venezuela 2000) – Semifinalist in Mr. American Continent 2000
- Unknown – Mister Joven Internacional 1998

== Big Seven men's pageants representatives ==
This is a list of Venezuela's representatives and their placements at the Big Seven men's international beauty pageants. Venezuela, widely considered a beauty pageant powerhouse with an extensive and successful history in beauty pageants, is also referred as the most powerful country in beauty pageants, winning multiple male competitions, with a total of 56 placements and 6 victories, counting:

- One — Manhunt International title (1999)
- One — Mister World title (1998)
- One — Mister International title (2013)
- One — Mister Universe title (2011)
- One — Mister Supranational title (2017)
- One — Man of the World title (2024)

Hundreds of men's beauty pageants are conducted yearly, but the Big Seven are considered the most prestigious, widely covered and broadcast by media. Various news agencies collectively refer to the seven major pageants as "Big Seven" namely: Manhunt International, Mister World, Mister International (Thailand), Mister Universe, Mister Global, Mister Supranational and Man of the World.

The criteria for the Big Seven inclusion are based on specific standards such as the pageant's international prominence and prestige accepted by mainstream media; the quality and quantity of crowned delegates recognized by international franchisees; the winner's post pageant activities; the pageant's longevity, consistency, and history; the execution of the pageant's specific cause, platform, and advocacy; the overall pre-pageant activities, production quality and global telecast; the enormity of internet traffic; and the extent of popularity across the globe.

=== National pageants ===
The following are national pageants which serve as qualifiers for the Big Seven men's pageants.

National pageants
List
- Mister Venezuela (since 1996)
- Miss & Mister Turismo Venezuela (since 2002)
- Mister Handsome Venezuela (since 2004)
- Señorita & Mister Deporte Venezuela (Mister Global Venezuela) (since 2010)
- Mister Universo Venezuela (since 2014)
- Mister Supranational Venezuela (since 2016)
- Caballero Venezuela (since 2019)

=== International pageants ===
The following are international pageants in which Venezuela has participated.

International pageants
Majors
- Manhunt International (1993–present)
- Mister World (1996–present)
- Mister International (2006–present)
- Mister Universe (2008–present)
- Mister Global (2014–present)
- Mister Supranational (2016–present)
- Man of the World (2017–present)
Minors
- Mister Young International (2000–present)
- Mister Model International (2013–present)
- Mister Globe (2015–present)
- Mister United Continents (2015–present)
- Mister Universal Ambassador (2015–present)
- Mister Universe International (2015–present)
- Man of the Year (2016–present)
- Mister Planet (2016–present)
- Mister Tourism World (2016–present)
- Mister Grand International (Brasil) (2017–present)
- Mister Grand International (Philippines) (2017–present)
- Mister Grand International (Myanmar) (2017–present)
- Mister National Universe (2017–present)
- Mister Tourism and Culture Universe (2017–present)
- Caballero Universal (2021–present)
- Mister Cosmopolitan (2023–present)
- Mr. Earth International (2023–present)
- The Mister International (2023–present)
- Mister Universe Tourism
Teen
- Mister Teen World (2003–present)
- Mister Teen Earth (2014–present)
- Mister Global Teen (2015–present)
Modeling
- Best Model of the World (1995–present)
- Elite Model Look Men (2014–present)
- Altitude World Supermodel (2018–present)
LGBTQ+ & Deaf
- Mister Gay World (2009–present)
- Mr. Gay International (2005–2012)
- Miss & Mister Deaf International (2010–present)
- Miss & Mister Deaf World (2010–present)
Discontinued
- Mr. Joven Internacional (1993–1999)
- Hombre Internacional (1998–2002)
- Male International Model (1998–2005)
- Mister Handsome International (1998–2019)
- Mister Intercontinental (1998–2002)
- Mister Grasim International (1998–2003)
- Mister Continents (1999–2003)
- Mister Tourism International (2001–2002; 2010–2015)
- Mister Latino International (2002–2004)
- Mister Model Millenium (2003)
- Mister Teen Continents (2002–2003)
- Mister Tourism Universe (2002–2005)
- International Best Male Model of the World (2003)
- Mister Earth (2003)
- Mr. Tourism World (2003)
- Axe Men World Male Model (2004)
- Mr. Globe (2004)
- Mister Teen Model World (2004)
- Zeus of the World (2004)
- Mister Continentes del Mundo (2005–2016)
- Mister Expo World (2005–2020)
- Mister Mundial (2005–2014)
- Mister Pacific of the World (2006–2018)
- World Most Beautiful Bum (2007–2008)
- Mister Sea World (2008–2019)
- Fresh Faces (2010–2013)
- Mister Teen Jade Universe (2010–2018)
- Mister Jade Universe (2010–2018)
- Mister Universo Mundial (2012–2019)
- Mister Pacífico y el Caribe (2012–2015)
- Mister América Internacional (2013–2019)
- Mister Mesoamérica International (2013–2019)
- Mister Teen Mesoamérica Universe (2013–2017)
- Mr. Joven Mesoamérica International (2014–2019)
- Mister Real Universe (2014–2019)
- Mister Teen América International (2014–2019)
- Mister Model Universe (2015–2019)
- Mister Trifinio Mundo Internacional (2017–2019)

=== Venezuelan Summary ===
As of the Man of the World 2024 edition that took place on July 26, 2024, there have been 82 Big Seven men's international titleholders.

As of the election of Sergio Azuaga as Man of the World 2024 on July 26, 2024, there have been 6 winners of the Big Seven men's international beauty pageants from Venezuela.

The following table details the placing of the Venezuela's representatives in the Big Seven men's pageants.

Color key

- Declared as winner
- Ended as runner-up
- Ended as top 5/8 qualification
- Ended as one of the finalists or semifinalists

Last edition	11th	24th	17th	12th	11th	9th	8th
Year	Mister World	Manhunt International	Mister International	Mister Universe	Mister Global	Mister Supranational	Man of the World
2026	TBA	TBA	TBA	TBA	TBA	Juan Carlos da Silva; Top 20	Manuel Alejandro Polanco
2025	Cancelled	Sergio Gómez; Top 20	Anthony Gallardo	Cancelled (Note: Competition was cancelled due to the COVID-19 pandemic)	William Badell; 1st Runner-Up	Víctor Battista; Top 10	Marcos Palacios
2024	Juan Alberto García; Top 10	Víctor Battista; 3rd Runner-Up	Enmanuel Serrano; Top 15	Cancelled	Sergio Gómez; Top 20	Marcos De Freitas; 3rd Runner-Up	Sergio Azuaga; WINNER
2023	Cancelled	Cancelled	William Badell; 1st Runner-Up	Cancelled	Daniel Olaves ×	Jorge Eduardo Núñez	Omar Riera; Top 17
2022	Cancelled	José Luis Trujillo; Top 16	Orangel Dirinot; 2nd Runner-Up	Cancelled	×	Anthony Gallardo; Top 20	César Leonardo Urbaneja ×
2021	Cancelled	Cancelled	Cancelled	Cancelled	Juan Carlos Da Silva; 3rd Runner-Up	William Badell; 2nd Runner-Up	Cancelled
2020	Cancelled	×	Cancelled	Cancelled	Cancelled	Cancelled	Cancelled
2019	Jorge Eduardo Núñez; Top 29	Cancelled	Cancelled	Luis Rodríguez López; Top 15	×	Leonardo Carrero; 4th Runner-Up	↑ No Delegate Sent (established in 2017 in Manila, Philippines. Venezuela sent their first delegate in 2023.)
2018	Cancelled	×	Francisco Piscitelli; 1st Runner-Up	Jaime Betancourt; 2nd Runner-Up	Christian Nunes; Top 10	Jeudiel Condado	↑ No Delegate Sent (established in 2017 in Manila, Philippines. Venezuela sent their first delegate in 2023.)
2017	Cancelled	Anderson Tovar ×	Ignacio Milles; Top 10	Jesús Zambrano	×	Gabriel Correa; WINNER	↑ No Delegate Sent (established in 2017 in Manila, Philippines. Venezuela sent their first delegate in 2023.)
2016	Renato Barabino ×	Francisco Gil; Top 16	Walfred Crespo; Top 16	Luis Domingo Báez; 1st Runner-Up	×	Gustavo Acevedo; Top 10	↑ No Delegate Sent (established in 2017 in Manila, Philippines. Venezuela sent their first delegate in 2023.)
2015	Cancelled	Cancelled	Rafael Angelucci; Top 10	Christian Nunes; Top 13	Yuber Jiménez; 1st Runner-Up	↑ No Pageant Held (established in 2016 in Warsaw, Poland.)	↑ No Delegate Sent (established in 2017 in Manila, Philippines. Venezuela sent their first delegate in 2023.)
2014	Jesús Casanova	Cancelled	Yarnaldo Morales ×	José Luis Fernández; 1st Runner-Up	↑ No Delegate Sent (established in 2014 in Bangkok, Thailand. Venezuela sent their first delegate in 2015.)	↑ No Pageant Held (established in 2016 in Warsaw, Poland.)	↑ No Delegate Sent (established in 2017 in Manila, Philippines. Venezuela sent their first delegate in 2023.)
2013	Cancelled	Cancelled	José Anmer Paredes; WINNER	Christian Rodríguez; Top 12	↑ No Delegate Sent (established in 2014 in Bangkok, Thailand. Venezuela sent their first delegate in 2015.)	↑ No Pageant Held (established in 2016 in Warsaw, Poland.)	↑ No Delegate Sent (established in 2017 in Manila, Philippines. Venezuela sent their first delegate in 2023.)
2012	Jessus Zambrano	Jeyco Estaba; Top 15	Gary Pinha; Top 16	Julio César Torres; 4th Runner-Up	↑ No Delegate Sent (established in 2014 in Bangkok, Thailand. Venezuela sent their first delegate in 2015.)	↑ No Pageant Held (established in 2016 in Warsaw, Poland.)	↑ No Delegate Sent (established in 2017 in Manila, Philippines. Venezuela sent their first delegate in 2023.)
2011	Cancelled	José Antonio Ampueda	Jeefry Rojas; Top 10	Juan Pablo Gómez; WINNER	↑ No Delegate Sent (established in 2014 in Bangkok, Thailand. Venezuela sent their first delegate in 2015.)	↑ No Pageant Held (established in 2016 in Warsaw, Poland.)	↑ No Delegate Sent (established in 2017 in Manila, Philippines. Venezuela sent their first delegate in 2023.)
2010	José Manuel Flores; Top 15	Henry Bolívar; Top 16	Francisco Emilio Sánchez; Top 15	Edgar Moreno; 3rd Runner-Up	↑ No Delegate Sent (established in 2014 in Bangkok, Thailand. Venezuela sent their first delegate in 2015.)	↑ No Pageant Held (established in 2016 in Warsaw, Poland.)	↑ No Delegate Sent (established in 2017 in Manila, Philippines. Venezuela sent their first delegate in 2023.)
2009	Cancelled	Cancelled	Luis Nuzzo; Top 10	×	↑ No Delegate Sent (established in 2014 in Bangkok, Thailand. Venezuela sent their first delegate in 2015.)	↑ No Pageant Held (established in 2016 in Warsaw, Poland.)	↑ No Delegate Sent (established in 2017 in Manila, Philippines. Venezuela sent their first delegate in 2023.)
2008	Cancelled	Orlando Delgado; Top 15	Marco Antonio Chinea; Top 10	Julio Sánchez-Vega; Top 10	↑ No Delegate Sent (established in 2014 in Bangkok, Thailand. Venezuela sent their first delegate in 2015.)	↑ No Pageant Held (established in 2016 in Warsaw, Poland.)	↑ No Delegate Sent (established in 2017 in Manila, Philippines. Venezuela sent their first delegate in 2023.)
2007	Vito Gasparrini	Germán González	Alberto Augusto García; 3rd Runner-Up	↑ No Pageant Held (established in 2008 in Santo Domingo, Dominican Republic.)	↑ No Delegate Sent (established in 2014 in Bangkok, Thailand. Venezuela sent their first delegate in 2015.)	↑ No Pageant Held (established in 2016 in Warsaw, Poland.)	↑ No Delegate Sent (established in 2017 in Manila, Philippines. Venezuela sent their first delegate in 2023.)
2006	Cancelled	Miguel Ángel Brito; Top 15	Javier Delgado; 1st Runner-Up	↑ No Pageant Held (established in 2008 in Santo Domingo, Dominican Republic.)	↑ No Delegate Sent (established in 2014 in Bangkok, Thailand. Venezuela sent their first delegate in 2015.)	↑ No Pageant Held (established in 2016 in Warsaw, Poland.)	↑ No Delegate Sent (established in 2017 in Manila, Philippines. Venezuela sent their first delegate in 2023.)
2005	Cancelled	Claudio de la Torre; Top 15	↑ No Pageant Held (established in 2006 in Jakarta, Indonesia and then it was transferred in 2022 in Bangkok, Thailand.)	↑ No Pageant Held (established in 2008 in Santo Domingo, Dominican Republic.)	↑ No Delegate Sent (established in 2014 in Bangkok, Thailand. Venezuela sent their first delegate in 2015.)	↑ No Pageant Held (established in 2016 in Warsaw, Poland.)	↑ No Delegate Sent (established in 2017 in Manila, Philippines. Venezuela sent their first delegate in 2023.)
2004	Cancelled	Cancelled	↑ No Pageant Held (established in 2006 in Jakarta, Indonesia and then it was transferred in 2022 in Bangkok, Thailand.)	↑ No Pageant Held (established in 2008 in Santo Domingo, Dominican Republic.)	↑ No Delegate Sent (established in 2014 in Bangkok, Thailand. Venezuela sent their first delegate in 2015.)	↑ No Pageant Held (established in 2016 in Warsaw, Poland.)	↑ No Delegate Sent (established in 2017 in Manila, Philippines. Venezuela sent their first delegate in 2023.)
2003	Andrés Mistage; Top 10	Cancelled	↑ No Pageant Held (established in 2006 in Jakarta, Indonesia and then it was transferred in 2022 in Bangkok, Thailand.)	↑ No Pageant Held (established in 2008 in Santo Domingo, Dominican Republic.)	↑ No Delegate Sent (established in 2014 in Bangkok, Thailand. Venezuela sent their first delegate in 2015.)	↑ No Pageant Held (established in 2016 in Warsaw, Poland.)	↑ No Delegate Sent (established in 2017 in Manila, Philippines. Venezuela sent their first delegate in 2023.)
2002	Cancelled	Daniel Navarrete; 4th Runner-Up	↑ No Pageant Held (established in 2006 in Jakarta, Indonesia and then it was transferred in 2022 in Bangkok, Thailand.)	↑ No Pageant Held (established in 2008 in Santo Domingo, Dominican Republic.)	↑ No Delegate Sent (established in 2014 in Bangkok, Thailand. Venezuela sent their first delegate in 2015.)	↑ No Pageant Held (established in 2016 in Warsaw, Poland.)	↑ No Delegate Sent (established in 2017 in Manila, Philippines. Venezuela sent their first delegate in 2023.)
2001	Cancelled	Luis Nery; 2nd Runner-Up	↑ No Pageant Held (established in 2006 in Jakarta, Indonesia and then it was transferred in 2022 in Bangkok, Thailand.)	↑ No Pageant Held (established in 2008 in Santo Domingo, Dominican Republic.)	↑ No Delegate Sent (established in 2014 in Bangkok, Thailand. Venezuela sent their first delegate in 2015.)	↑ No Pageant Held (established in 2016 in Warsaw, Poland.)	↑ No Delegate Sent (established in 2017 in Manila, Philippines. Venezuela sent their first delegate in 2023.)
2000	Alejandro Otero; Top 10	José Gabriel Madonia; 3rd Runner-Up	↑ No Pageant Held (established in 2006 in Jakarta, Indonesia and then it was transferred in 2022 in Bangkok, Thailand.)	↑ No Pageant Held (established in 2008 in Santo Domingo, Dominican Republic.)	↑ No Delegate Sent (established in 2014 in Bangkok, Thailand. Venezuela sent their first delegate in 2015.)	↑ No Pageant Held (established in 2016 in Warsaw, Poland.)	↑ No Delegate Sent (established in 2017 in Manila, Philippines. Venezuela sent their first delegate in 2023.)
1999	Cancelled	Ernesto Calzadilla; WINNER	↑ No Pageant Held (established in 2006 in Jakarta, Indonesia and then it was transferred in 2022 in Bangkok, Thailand.)	↑ No Pageant Held (established in 2008 in Santo Domingo, Dominican Republic.)	↑ No Delegate Sent (established in 2014 in Bangkok, Thailand. Venezuela sent their first delegate in 2015.)	↑ No Pageant Held (established in 2016 in Warsaw, Poland.)	↑ No Delegate Sent (established in 2017 in Manila, Philippines. Venezuela sent their first delegate in 2023.)
1998	Sandro Finoglio; WINNER	Jossman Peñalver	↑ No Pageant Held (established in 2006 in Jakarta, Indonesia and then it was transferred in 2022 in Bangkok, Thailand.)	↑ No Pageant Held (established in 2008 in Santo Domingo, Dominican Republic.)	↑ No Delegate Sent (established in 2014 in Bangkok, Thailand. Venezuela sent their first delegate in 2015.)	↑ No Pageant Held (established in 2016 in Warsaw, Poland.)	↑ No Delegate Sent (established in 2017 in Manila, Philippines. Venezuela sent their first delegate in 2023.)
1997	Cancelled	Sandro Finoglio; 1st Runner-Up	↑ No Pageant Held (established in 2006 in Jakarta, Indonesia and then it was transferred in 2022 in Bangkok, Thailand.)	↑ No Pageant Held (established in 2008 in Santo Domingo, Dominican Republic.)	↑ No Delegate Sent (established in 2014 in Bangkok, Thailand. Venezuela sent their first delegate in 2015.)	↑ No Pageant Held (established in 2016 in Warsaw, Poland.)	↑ No Delegate Sent (established in 2017 in Manila, Philippines. Venezuela sent their first delegate in 2023.)
1996	José Gregorio Faría	Cancelled	↑ No Pageant Held (established in 2006 in Jakarta, Indonesia and then it was transferred in 2022 in Bangkok, Thailand.)	↑ No Pageant Held (established in 2008 in Santo Domingo, Dominican Republic.)	↑ No Delegate Sent (established in 2014 in Bangkok, Thailand. Venezuela sent their first delegate in 2015.)	↑ No Pageant Held (established in 2016 in Warsaw, Poland.)	↑ No Delegate Sent (established in 2017 in Manila, Philippines. Venezuela sent their first delegate in 2023.)
1995	↑ No Pageant Held (established in 1996 in England, United Kingdom.)	↑ No Delegate Sent (established in 1993 in Gold Coast, Queensland, Australia. Venezuela sent their first delegate in 1997.)	↑ No Pageant Held (established in 2006 in Jakarta, Indonesia and then it was transferred in 2022 in Bangkok, Thailand.)	↑ No Pageant Held (established in 2008 in Santo Domingo, Dominican Republic.)	↑ No Delegate Sent (established in 2014 in Bangkok, Thailand. Venezuela sent their first delegate in 2015.)	↑ No Pageant Held (established in 2016 in Warsaw, Poland.)	↑ No Delegate Sent (established in 2017 in Manila, Philippines. Venezuela sent their first delegate in 2023.)
1994	↑ No Pageant Held (established in 1996 in England, United Kingdom.)	↑ No Delegate Sent (established in 1993 in Gold Coast, Queensland, Australia. Venezuela sent their first delegate in 1997.)	↑ No Pageant Held (established in 2006 in Jakarta, Indonesia and then it was transferred in 2022 in Bangkok, Thailand.)	↑ No Pageant Held (established in 2008 in Santo Domingo, Dominican Republic.)	↑ No Delegate Sent (established in 2014 in Bangkok, Thailand. Venezuela sent their first delegate in 2015.)	↑ No Pageant Held (established in 2016 in Warsaw, Poland.)	↑ No Delegate Sent (established in 2017 in Manila, Philippines. Venezuela sent their first delegate in 2023.)
1993	↑ No Pageant Held (established in 1996 in England, United Kingdom.)	↑ No Delegate Sent (established in 1993 in Gold Coast, Queensland, Australia. Venezuela sent their first delegate in 1997.)	↑ No Pageant Held (established in 2006 in Jakarta, Indonesia and then it was transferred in 2022 in Bangkok, Thailand.)	↑ No Pageant Held (established in 2008 in Santo Domingo, Dominican Republic.)	↑ No Delegate Sent (established in 2014 in Bangkok, Thailand. Venezuela sent their first delegate in 2015.)	↑ No Pageant Held (established in 2016 in Warsaw, Poland.)	↑ No Delegate Sent (established in 2017 in Manila, Philippines. Venezuela sent their first delegate in 2023.)

× Did not compete
↑ No pageant held

==== Placements ====
Pageant	Entrants	Unplacements	Placements	Best result
Mister World	10	4 (1996 • 2007 • 2012 • 2014)	6 (1998 • 2000 • 2003 • 2010 • 2019 • 2024)	1 Winner (1998)
Manhunt International	17	3 (1998 • 2007 • 2011)	14 (1997 • 1999 • 2000 • 2001 • 2002 • 2005 • 2006 • 2008 • 2010 • 2012 • 2016 • 2022 • 2024 • 2025)	1 Winner (1999)
Mister International	16	1 (2025)	15 (2006 • 2007 • 2008 • 2009 • 2010 • 2011 • 2012 • 2013 • 2015 • 2016 • 2017 • 2018 • 2022 • 2023 • 2024)	1 Winner (2013)
Mister Universe	11	1 (2017)	10 (2008 • 2010 • 2011 • 2012 • 2013 • 2014 • 2015 • 2016 • 2018 • 2019)	1 Winner (2011)
Mister Global	5	×	5 (2015 • 2018 • 2021 • 2024 • 2025)	1st Runner-Up (2015 • 2025)
Mister Supranational	9	2 (2018 • 2023)	7 (2016 • 2017 • 2019 • 2021 • 2022 • 2024 • 2025)	1 Winner (2017)
Man of the World	3	1 (2025)	2 (2023 • 2024)	1 Winner (2024)
Total	71	12	59	6 titles

==== Historic placement positions ====
Pageant	Total	Winner (1st Place)	1st Runner-Up (2nd Place)	2nd Runner-Up (3rd Place)	3rd Runner-Up (4th Place)	4th Runner-Up (5th Place)	Finalists (Top 5/8)	Semifs./ Quarterfs. (Top 9/29)
Mister World	6	1 (1998)	×	×	×	×	×	5 (2000 • 2003 • 2010 • 2019 • 2024)
Manhunt International	14	1 (1999)	1 (1997)	1 (2001)	2 (2000 • 2024)	1 (2002)	×	8 (2005 • 2006 • 2008 • 2010 • 2012 • 2016 • 2022 • 2025)
Mister International	15	1 (2013)	3 (2006 • 2018• 2023)	1 (2022)	1 (2007)	×	×	9 (2008 • 2009 • 2010 • 2011 • 2012 • 2015 • 2016 • 2017 • 2024)
Mister Universe	10	1 (2011)	2 (2014 • 2016)	1 (2018)	1 (2010)	1 (2012)	×	4 (2008 • 2013 • 2015 • 2019)
Mister Global	5	×	2 (2015 • 2025)	×	1 (2021)	×	×	2 (2018 • 2024)
Mister Supranational	7	1 (2017)	×	1 (2021)	1 (2024)	1 (2019)	×	3 (2016 • 2022 • 2025)
Man of the World	2	1 (2024)	×	×	×	×	×	1 (2023)
Total	59	6	8	4	6	3	0	32

Absences

Pageant	Absences
Mister World	1 (2016)
Manhunt International	6 (1993 • 1994 • 1995 • 2017 • 2018 • 2020)
Mister International	1 (2014)
Mister Universe	1 (2009)
Mister Global	6 (2014 • 2016 • 2017 • 2019 • 2022 • 2023)
Mister Supranational	×
Man of the World	4 (2017 • 2018 • 2019 • 2022)
Total	19

=== Margarita Island Summary ===
Mister Universo Isla de Margarita
Represented
List
- 2008: Francisco Diaz – Unplaced
- 2011: Carlos Martínez – Unplaced
- 2013: Octavio Centeno – Unplaced
- 2014: Edward Rojas – Unplaced (Mr. Congeniality)
- 2015: Mariano Palacios – Unplaced
- 2016: Florentino Rodríguez – Unplaced
- 2017: Douglas Castro – 5th Runner-Up
- 2018: Jesús Urdaneta – Top 12 (Mr. Elegance)
- 2019: Carlos Guédez – Unplaced

=== Hosting ===
Venezuela had never host a major international pageant.

=== List of crossovers ===
Crossover winners of a major national pageant or crossover representatives in the line of international beauty pageants.

- Sandro Finoglio – Finoglio was the first crossover candidate to accomplish this feat. Sandro won Mister Venezuela 1997. He placed 1st runner-up in Manhunt International 1997 and then won the Mister World 1998 title.
- Christian Nunes – Nunes won Mister Universo Venezuela 2014, he went to compete in Mister Universe 2015 placing in the Top 13. After this he won Mister Venezuela 2017 and then was designated to participate in Mister Global 2018 where he finished as Top 10.
- Jorge Eduardo Núñez – Núñez initially won Mister Venezuela 2019 and then placed Top 29 in Mister World 2019. After this he won Mister Supranational Venezuela 2023 and went to compete in Mister Supranational 2023 but unplaced.
- William Badell – Badell won Mister Supranational Venezuela 2021 and placed 2nd runner-up in Mister Supranational 2021. Then he was designated to compete in Mister International 2023, where he placed 1st runner-up. Finally, he competed in Mister Global 2025, where he placed 1st runner-up again.
- Sergio Gómez – Gómez placed Top 20 in both, Mister Global 2024 and Manhunt International 2025.
- Víctor Battista – Battista placed 3rd runner-up at Manhunt International 2024 and Top 10 at Mister Supranational 2025.
- Anthony Gallardo – Gallardo placed Top 20 in Mister Supranational 2022. Then was designated to compete in Mister International 2025, but unplaced.

== See also ==
- Miss Venezuela
- Venezuela at the Big Seven men's international beauty pageants
- Manhunt International
- Mister World
- Mister Global
- Mister Supranational
- Man of the World
- List of beauty pageants
