= Mister Venezuela 2015 =

12th Mister Venezuela pageant

- Date: May 23, 2015
- Presenters: Kerly Ruiz; Maira Alexandra Rodríguez
- Entertainment: Liz
- Venue: Estudio 1 de Venevisión, Caracas, Venezuela
- Broadcaster: International: Univisión; Venevisión Plus; DirecTV; Official broadcaster: Venevisión
- Entrants: 14
- Placements: 5
- Winner: Gabriel Correa; Aragua
- Best Body: Gabriel Correa (Aragua)
- Smile: Rafael Oropeza (Lara)

Mister Venezuela 2015 was the 12th Mister Venezuela pageant. It was held at the Estudio 1 de Venevisión in Caracas, Venezuela on May 23, 2015.

At the end of the event, Jesús Casanova of Barinas titled Gabriel Correa of Aragua as Mister Venezuela 2015. He represented Venezuela at the Mister Supranational 2017 pageant winning the first title for the country.

The runner-up position went to Rafael Angelucci of Lara.

== Pageant ==
=== Selection committee ===
The judges for Mister Venezuela include:

- Alexandra Braun – Actress, model, host and Miss Earth 2005
- Ana Alicia Alba – Journaslit and Sexo al Desnudo host
- Mariela Celis – Portada's host
- Fanny Ottati – Model and Más Plus host
- Alejandra Sandoval – Colombian actress
- Diana Patricia, La Macarena – Flamenco dancer
- Amanda Herrera – Diana Patricia's mother
- María Alejandra Yánez – Stylist and Jesús Morales representative

== Results ==
Color key

- Declared as winner
- Ended as runner-up
- Ended as top 5/8 qualification
- Ended as one of the finalists or semifinalists
- Ended as special awards winner

Placement	Contestant	International placement
Mister Venezuela 2015	Aragua (No. 13) – Gabriel Correa	Winner – Mister Supranational 2017
1st runner-up	Lara (No. 10) – Rafael Angelucci	Top 10 – Mister International 2015
2nd runner-up	Lara (No. 6) – Georges Biloune	
Top 5	Bolívar (No. 2) – Gibson Domínguez; Lara (No. 4) – Rafael Oropeza	

=== Mister Supranational Venezuela 2018 ===
Placement	Contestant	International placement
Mister Supranational Venezuela 2018	Miranda (No. 3) – Jeudiel Condado	Unplaced – Mister Supranational 2018

=== Special awards ===
Award	Contestant
Actors in Venevisión	Aragua (No. 13) – Gabriel Correa; Lara (No. 10) – Rafael Angelucci; Bolívar (No. 2) – Gibson Domínguez; Distrito Capital (No. 11) – Leonardo Pantoja
Best Body	Aragua (No. 13) – Gabriel Correa
Miss Venezuela Mundo Host	Lara (No. 6) – Georges Biloune
Best Smile	Lara (No. 4) – Rafael Oropeza

== Contestants ==
14 contestants competed for the title.

No.	Contestant	Age (Note: Ages at the time of the pageant)	Height	Hometown
1	José Luis Fernández	24	1.86 m (6 ft 1 in)	Caracas
2	Gibson Domínguez Suárez	24	1.87 m (6 ft 1 1/2 in)	Puerto Ordaz
3	Jeudiel Enrique Condado Grimán	25	1.84 m (6 ft 1/2 in)	San Antonio de Los Altos
4	Rafael Eduardo Oropeza García	21	1.90 m (6 ft 3 in)	Barquisimeto
5	José Andrés Márquez Blondel	24	1.88 m (6 ft 2 in)	Maturín
6	Georges Abelardo Biloune Wahbi	29	1.81 m (5 ft 11 1/2 in)	Barquisimeto
7	Anthony Alexander Domont Sulvarán	26	1.80 m (5 ft 11 in)	Los Teques
8	Fabel Antonio Pauque Cordero	20	1.82 m (5 ft 11 1/2 in)	Cabimas
9	Jesús Alberto D'Auria Guzmán	23	1.85 m (6 ft 1 in)	Caracas
10	Rafael Angelucci Pereira	22	1.87 m (6 ft 1 1/2 in)	Barquisimeto
11	Leonardo Pantoja	26	1.83 m (6 ft 0 in)	Caracas
12	Marco Di Salvatore	26	1.88 m (6 ft 2 in)	Valencia
13	Gabriel José Correa Guzmán	26	1.88 m (6 ft 2 in)	Maracay
14	José Andrés Rivero	27	1.90 m (6 ft 3 in)	Maturín

Notes

- Gabriel Correa (No. 13) won the Mister Supranational 2017 title in Krynica-Zdrój, Poland.
- Rafael Angelucci (No. 10) placed as Top 10 in Mister International 2015 in Manila, Philippines.
- Jeudiel Condado (No. 3) unplaced in Mister Supranational 2018 in Krynica-Zdrój, Poland.
- Rafael Oropeza (No. 4) and Georges Biloune (No. 6) became TV hosts.
