= Jesus Zambrano =

Jesús Zambrano may refer to

- Jesús Zambrano Grijalva (born 1953), Mexican politician
- Jessus Zambrano (Jesus Alberto Zambrano Contreras, born 1989), Venezuelan model and actor
