= Gasparrini =

Gasparrini is a surname. Notable people with the surname include:

- Guglielmo Gasparrini (1803–1866), Italian botanist and mycologist
- Rino Gasparrini (born 1992), Italian cyclist
- Vito Gasparrini (born 1975), Venezuelan model
