= Mister Venezuela 1999 =

4th Mister Venezuela pageant

- Date: November 4, 1999
- Presenters: Maite Delgado
- Entertainment: Carolina Perpetuo
- Venue: Estudio 1 de Venevisión, Caracas, Venezuela
- Broadcaster: International: Univisión; DirecTV; Official broadcaster: Venevisión
- Entrants: 26
- Placements: 10
- Winner: Alejandro Otero; Distrito Federal
- Photogenic: Roy Pérez; Raúl Salazar
- Best Body: José Gabriel Madonia (Distrito Federal)
- Etiquette: Ezzio Cavallaro (Miranda)

Mister Venezuela 1999 was the fourth Mister Venezuela pageant. It was held at the Estudio 1 de Venevisión in Caracas, Venezuela on November 4, 1999.

At the end of the event, Ernesto Calzadilla of Distrito Federal titled Alejandro Otero of Distrito Federal as Mister Venezuela 1999. He represented Venezuela at the Mister World 2000 pageant placing in the Top 10.

The runner-up position went to Ezzio Cavallaro of Miranda.

== Results ==
Color key

- Declared as winner
- Ended as runner-up
- Ended as top 5/8 qualification
- Ended as one of the finalists or semifinalists
- Ended as special awards winner

Placement	Contestant	International placement
Mister Venezuela 1999	Distrito Federal (No. 20) – Alejandro Otero	Top 10 – Mister World 2000
1st runner-up	Miranda (No. 26) – Ezzio Cavallaro	Top 6 (3rd runner-up) – Grasim Mr. International 2000
2nd runner-up	Distrito Federal (No. 11) – José Gabriel Madonia	3rd runner-up – Manhunt International 2000
2nd runner-up	Distrito Federal (No. 11) – José Gabriel Madonia	Mr. American Continent 2000
Top 10	Monagas (No. 1) – Abelardo Behna; Distrito Federal (No. 2) – Adrián Acevedo; (No. 7) – Eric Chacín; Distrito Federal (No. 10) – Jorge Furzán; Vargas (No. 12) – León Peraza; (No. 16) – William Von Moltke; (No. 24) – Roy Pérez	

=== Mr. Tourism International Venezuela 2001 ===
Placement	Contestant	International placement
Mr. Tourism International Venezuela 2001	Carabobo (No. 14) – Hugo Zafra	Mr. Fitness – Mr. Tourism International 2001

=== International Male Model Venezuela 2000 ===
Placement	Contestant	International placement
International Male Model Venezuela 2000	Zulia (No. 21) – Juan Carlos Tarazona	Unplaced – International Male Model 2000

=== Special awards ===
Award	Contestant
Best Body	Distrito Federal (No. 11) – José Gabriel Madonia
Mister Etiquette	Miranda (No. 26) – Ezzio Cavallaro
Mister Photogenic	(No. 24) – Roy Pérez; (No. 25) – Raúl Salazar

== Contestants ==
26 contestants competed for the title.

No.	Contestant	Age (Note: Ages at the time of the pageant)	Height	Hometown
1	Abelardo Jesús Behna Bassar	18	1.96 m (6 ft 5 in)	Maturín
2	Adrián Acevedo Dicillo	19		Caracas
3	Alberto "All" José Kanjian Azar	19		Caracas
4	Argenis Azuaje			
5	Carlos Alfonso Lee Moratto	18		
6	Danilo Rubiano			
7	Eric Chacín			
8	Gabriel Borges			
9	Hansell Antonio Gedler Di Gregorio			
10	Jorge Daniel Furzán Bastidas	20		Caracas
11	José Gabriel Madonía Panepinto	22	1.89 m (6 ft 2 1/2 in)	Caracas
12	León Vicente Peraza Napolitano	19	1.84 m (6 ft 1/2 in)	La Guaira
13	Enny Gamero			
14	Hugo José Zafra Aguilar	22		Valencia
15	Miguel Ángel Polanco			
16	William Helmuth Von Moltke Hemsem			
17	Alexander Chacón	22		Caracas
18	Héctor Tello			
19	Daniel García			
20	Alejandro Otero Lárez	25	1.87 m (6 ft 1 1/2 in)	Caracas
21	Juan Carlos Tarazona	21		Maracaibo
22	Marcos Torres			
23	Manuel Álvarez			
24	Roy Pérez			
25	Raúl Salazar			
26	Ezzio Vincenzo Cavallaro Abreu	21	1.87 m (6 ft 1 1/2 in)	Petare

Notes

- Alejandro Otero (No. 20) placed as Top 10 in Mister World 2000 in Perthshire, Scotland.
- Ezzio Cavallaro (No. 6) placed as Top 6 (3rd runner-up) in Grasim Mr. International 2000 in Jodhpur, India.
- José Gabriel Madonia (No. 11) placed as 3rd runner-up in Manhunt International 2000 in Singapore and then won the Mr. American Continent 20000 title in Oranjestad, Aruba.
- Hugo Zafra unplaced in Mr. Tourism International 2001 in Panama City, Panama.
- Juan Carlos Tarazona (No. 21) competed together with Diego Ochoa from previous edition in the International Male Model competition in Oranjestad, Aruba.
- Alejandro Otero (No. 20), Ezzio Cavallaro (No. 26), José Gabriel Madonia (No. 11), Juan Carlos Tarazona (No. 21) and Abelardo Behna (No. 1) became actors.
