= José Gabriel Madonia =

Venezuelan actor, model, and male beauty pageant titleholder

- Born: June 1, 1976 (age 50); Caracas, Venezuela
- Occupations: Actor, Model
- Website: https://gabrielmadonia.com/

José Gabriel Madonia (born 1 June 1976) is a Venezuelan actor and model.

== Biography ==
He began his modelling career by participating in the 1999 edition of Mister Venezuela where he became Second Runner Up. He was then sent to Singapore to compete in the Manhunt International pageant.

In 2012, he joined the cast of the telenovela Válgame Dios where he played a chef named Guto.

Madonia has also participated in several theater productions. In 2013, he joined renowned actresses Astrid Carolina Herrera and Hilda Abrahamz in the stage play titled Tres.

== Telenovelas ==
Year	Title	Role
2006	Por todo lo alto	Rómulo
2008	La trepadora	Jonás
2010	La mujer perfecta	Dr. Augusto
2011	Natalia del Mar	Osvaldo Sandoval
2012	Válgame Dios	Augusto 'Guto' Vázco

== Theater ==
- Cuidado Simoncito está soñando
- Tres
- Amigos Tres Leches
- Quien se llevo la Navidad
- Hombre de Bar en Bar
- Se abrió la jaula

Awards and achievements
Preceded by (Jamaica) Kirk Hedley	Manhunt International 3rd Runner-up; 2000	Succeeded by (Croatia) Adnan Taletovic
Preceded by (Zulia) Nadir Nery	Mister Venezuela 2nd Runner-up; 1999	Succeeded by (Guárico) Aníbal Martignani
