= William Badell =

Venezuelan model and beauty pageant titleholder (born 1996)

- Born: William Manuel Badell López; June 29, 1996 (age 30); Maracaibo, Zulia, Venezuela
- Occupations: Model; Steward
- Height: 1.88 m (6 ft 2 in)
- Beauty pageant titleholder
- Title: Mister Supranational Venezuela 2021; Mister International Venezuela 2023; Mister Global Venezuela 2025
- Hair color: Brown
- Eye color: Brown
- Major competitions: Mister Supranational Venezuela 2021; (Winner); Mister Supranational 2021; (2nd Runner-Up); Mister International 2023; (1st Runner-Up); Mister Global 2025; (1st Runner-Up)

William Manuel Badell López (born June 29, 1996) is a Venezuelan model and beauty pageant titleholder. He won Mister Supranational Venezuela in 2021 where he represented Venezuela in Mister Supranational 2021 where he ended up winning the third place behind the eventual winner, Varo Vargas of Peru.

== Career ==
Badell was born in Maracaibo, Zulia but his entire life grow up in Valencia, Carabobo. He is a Mass Media and Social Communications student and he is currently living in Dubai where he works as a model and cabin crew flight attendant member for the airline Emirates. He has six siblings. Badell comes from the Wayúu ethnic group

=== Pageantry ===
Badell began his pageant career by winning the national title of Mister Supranational Venezuela 2021. Representing his country at the international Mister Supranational that year, he secured the position of second runner-up. He pageant journey continued with a first runner-up finish at Mister International 2023 in Thailand. In 2025, he was selected to represent Venezuela at Mister Global, where he again achieved first runner-up.

Awards and achievements
Preceded by (Spain) Manuel Romo	Mister Global 1st Runner-Up; 2025	Succeeded by (Nigeria) Bethel Mbamara
Preceded by (India) Lukanand Kshetrimayum	Mister International 1st Runner-Up; 2023	Succeeded by (Vietnam) Nguyễn Mạnh Lân
Preceded by (Peru) Alonzo Martinez Vivanco	Mister Supranational 2nd Runner-Up; 2021	Succeeded by (Greece) Leonidas Amfilochios
