= Supranational Venezuela 2021 =

2nd Supranational Venezuela pageant

- Date: May 27, 2021
- Presenters: Alejandro Carreño; Ana Karina Jardim
- Venue: Globovisión Studios, Caracas, Venezuela
- Broadcaster: International: DirecTV; Official broadcaster: Globovisión
- Entrants: 10 (Miss & Mister)
- Placements: 5 (Miss & Mister)
- Winner: Valentina Sánchez; Nueva Esparta; William Badell; Zulia

Supranational Venezuela 2021 was the second Supranational Venezuela pageant. It was held at the Globovisión Studios in Caracas, Venezuela on May 27 22, 2021.

At the end of the event, Gabriela de la Cruz of Carabobo crowned her successor Valentina Sánchez of Nueva Esparta as Miss Supranational Venezuela 2021. She represented Venezuela at the Miss Supranational 2021 pageant placing as 3rd runner-up.

Also, Leonardo Carrero of Mérida titled his successor William Badell of Zulia as Mister Supranational Venezuela 2021. He represented Venezuela at the Mister Supranational 2021 pageant placing as 2nd runner-up.

== Pageant ==
=== Selection committee ===
The judges for Miss Supranational Venezuela include:

- Tomás Seif – Dentist, specialist in aesthetic restorative dentistry
- Ligia González – Dermatologist
- Jesús Soler – SolerPharma president
- Érika Guerero – Erika's Cosmetic president
- Carlos Delgado – Plastic surgeon
- Erick Boscán – Banco Plaza president
- Jholeidys Silva – Velvet The Beauty House president
- Sandro Finoglio – Mister Venezuela 1997, 1st runner-up in Manhunt International 1997 and Mister World 1998
- Carlos Pérez – Fashion designer
- Vanessa Torres – Stylist
- Otayma Zerpa – Otayma Zerpa Designs president
- Luigi Ratino – Artistic representative
- Jorge Jaimes – Fashion designer
- Eleazar Guzmán – Personal trainer

== Results ==
=== Miss Supranational Venezuela ===
Color key

- Declared as winner
- Ended as runner-up or top 5/8 qualification
- Ended as one of the finalists or semifinalists

Placement	Contestant	International Placement
Miss Supranational Venezuela 2021	Nueva Esparta (No. 9) – Valentina Sánchez	3rd runner-up — Miss Supranational 2021
1st runner-up	Distrito Capital (No. 3) – Elizabeth Gasiba	
2nd runner-up	Lara (No. 10) – Verónica Dugarte	
3rd runner-up	Distrito Capital (No. 2) – Dreissmar Soto	
4th runner-up	Aragua (No. 7) – Nathaly Flores	

=== Mister Supranational Venezuela ===
Placement	Contestant	International Placement
Mister Supranational Venezuela 2021	Zulia (No. 10) – William Badell	2nd runner-up — Mister Supranational 2021
1st runner-up	Distrito Capital (No. 7) – Juan Pablo Dos Santos	
2nd runner-up	Carabobo (No. 6) – Juan Alberto García	
3rd runner-up	Aragua (No. 3) – Franceso Piscitelli	
4th runner-up	Miranda (No. 5) – Jean Franco Petit	

=== Special awards ===
==== Miss Supranational Venezuela ====
Award	Top 3	Winner
Interactive Supranational		No. 9 – Valentina Sánchez
Best Face		No. 3 – Elizabeth Gasiba
Best Hair	No. 2 – Dreissmar Soto; No. 7 – Nathaly Flores	No. 3 – Elizabeth Gasiba
Best Figure	No. 7 – Nathaly Flores; No. 9 – Valentina Sánchez	No. 3 – Elizabeth Gasiba
Best Catwalk	No. 3 – Elizabeth Gasiba; No. 10 – Verónica Dugarte	No. 2 – Dreissmar Soto
Best Skin	No. 7 – Nathaly Flores; No. 10 – Verónica Dugarte	No. 9 – Valentina Sánchez
Best Smile	No. 2 – Dreissmar Soto; No. 9 – Valentina Sánchez	No. 3 – Elizabeth Gasiba
Impact Face	No. 3 – Elizabeth Gasiba; No. 9 – Valentina Sánchez	No. 2 – Dreissmar Soto
Supranational Fitness	No. 3 – Elizabeth Gasiba; No. 10 – Verónica Dugarte	No. 9 – Valentina Sánchez

==== Mister Supranational Venezuela ====
Award	Top 3	Winner
Interactive Supranational		No. 7 – Juan Pablo Dos Santos
Best Face		No. 5 – Jean Franco Petit
Best Body	No. 3 – Franceso Piscitelli; No. 5 – Jean Franco Petit	No. 7 – Juan Pablo Dos Santos
Best Skin	No. 7 – Juan Pablo Dos Santos; No. 10 – William Badell	No. 3 – Franceso Piscitelli
Best Smile	No. 3 – Franceso Piscitelli; No. 7 – Juan Pablo Dos Santos	No. 6 – Juan Alberto García
Mister Elegance	No. 3 – Franceso Piscitelli; No. 10 – William Badell	No. 7 – Juan Pablo Dos Santos
Mister Personality	No. 5 – Jean Franco Petit; No. 10 – William Badell	No. 7 – Juan Pablo Dos Santos
Impact Face	No. 3 – Franceso Piscitelli; No. 6 – Juan Alberto García	No. 7 – Juan Pablo Dos Santos
Supranational Fitness	No. 3 – Franceso Piscitelli; No. 6 – Juan Alberto García	No. 10 – William Badell

== Contestants ==
=== Miss Supranational Venezuela ===
10 contestants competed for the title.

No.	Contestant	Age (Note: Ages at the time of the pageant)	Height	Hometown
1	Bárbara Lara	19	1.71 m (5 ft 7 in)	Petare
2	Dreissmar Soto	22	1.70 m (5 ft 7 in)	Ciudad Guayana
3	Elizabeth Mariana Carolina Gasiba de la Hoz	24	1.77 m (5 ft 10 in)	Caracas
4	Érika Rehkoff	28	1.74 m (5 ft 9 in)	Caracas
5	Grecia Andreína Bitchachi	22	1.75 m (5 ft 9 in)	Caracas
6	Isabella Cristina Caamaño	19	1.77 m (5 ft 10 in)	Cumaná
7	Nathaly Katherine Flores Mendoza	25	1.74 m (5 ft 9 in)	La Victoria
8	Oscaraiany Pérez	18	1.83 m (6 ft 0 in)	Maracay
9	Valentina Belén Sánvhez Trivella	25	1.80 m (5 ft 11 in)	Porlamar
10	Verónica Dugarte Riera	24	1.78 m (5 ft 10 in)	Barquisimeto

=== Mister Supranational Venezuela ===
10 contestants competed for the title.

No.	Contestant	Age	Height	Hometown
1	Eugenio Fernández	29	1.83 m (6 ft 0 in)	Valencia
2	Franceso Emmanuel Lauretta	23	1.80 m (5 ft 11 in)	Maracay
3	Franceso Giuseppe Piscitelli	23	1.82 m (6 ft 0 in)	Maracay
4	Gerardo Martínez	25	1.89 m (6 ft 2 in)	Maturín
5	Jean Franco Petit	20	1.82 m (6 ft 0 in)	San Antonio de los Altos
6	Juan Alberto García	22	1.92 m (6 ft 4 in)	Valencia
7	Juan Pablo Dos Santos	22	1.90 m (6 ft 3 in)	Caracas
8	Ricardo Verenzuela	21	1.83 m (6 ft 0 in)	Palo Negro
9	Samderson Roa	26	1.80 m (5 ft 11 in)	Caracas
10	William Manuel Badell López	24	1.88 m (6 ft 2 in)	Maracaibo
