= José Manuel Flores Sánchez =

Venezuelan model and male beauty pageant titleholder

- Born: September 25, 1986 (age 40); Caracas, Distrito Capital, Venezuela
- Modeling information
- Height: 195 cm (6 ft 5 in)
- Hair color: Brown
- Eye color: Brown

José Manuel Flores Sánchez (born September 25, 1986, in Caracas) is a Venezuelan model who was selected Mister Venezuela 2009. Flores was also a rugby player and graduated from Business Management, majoring in Finance & Banking, with a minor in Globalization in the Universidad Metropolitana, in Caracas. He stands 195 cm (6 ft 5 in).

Flores was the Venezuelan delegate for the Mister World 2010 pageant placing in the Top 15.

As of 2011, Flores worked with Venezuela-based record label Cacao Music.

Awards and achievements
Preceded by Vito Gasparrini (Caracas)	Mister Venezuela; 2009	Succeeded by Jessus Zambrano (Caracas)
