= Man of the World 2024 =

- Date: 26 July 2024
- Presenters: Mary Kristel Galang; Ryan Tercero
- Venue: Winford Resort and Casino, Manila, Philippines
- Entrants: 23
- Placements: 15
- Debuts: Cambodia; Eritrea; Cote D'Ivore; France
- Withdrawals: Algeria; Cuba; Ghana; Pakistan; Panama; Sri Lanka; Syria; United States; Zimbabwe
- Returns: Australia; Brazil; Colombia; Ecuador; Italy; Morocco
- Winner: Sergio Azuaga; Venezuela
- Congeniality: Sebastian Mora (Ecuador); Rostislav Procházka (Czech Republic)
- Best National Costume: Lavesh Mohan Bharambe (India)
- Photogenic: Sergio Avila (Spain)

Man of the World 2024 was the sixth edition of the Man of the World competition, held at the Samsung Performing Arts Theater in Makati, Metro Manila, Philippines, on July 26, 2024.

On July 25, 2024, the Man of the World Organization announced that the pageant will be held in a new venue, Winford Resort and Casino Manila instead of the latter venue due to the existing weather conditions caused by the southwest monsoon (habagat) and Typhoon Carina.

Man of the World 2022 Aditya Khurana of India crowned Sergio Azuaga of Venezuela at the end of the event, stepping in for Man of the World 2023 Jin Wook Kim of Korea who was unable to fly from South Korea to the Philippines to attend the event due to the aforementioned inclement weather.

Azuaga's victory marked the first time Venezuela and a delegate from the Americas won Man of the World.

== Results ==
=== Placements ===
Placement	Contestant	Ref
Man of the World 2024	Venezuela – Sergio Azuaga	
1st Runner-Up	Philippines – Kenneth Cabungcal	
2nd Runner-Up	France – Gwen Jegouzo	
3rd Runner-Up	Puerto Rico – Fernando Padín	
4th Runner-Up	Ecuador – Sebastián Mora	
Top 10	Brazil – Cassio Leles De Souza; Eritrea – Paulos Tecle; India – Lavesh Bharambe; Spain – Sergio Ávila; Vietnam – Đoàn Công Vinh §	
Top 15	Australia – Amit Saini §; Colombia – David Linares; Dominican Republic – Junior Mendoza; Malaysia – Edison Ho; United Kingdom – Kazim Keskin	

§ Automatic placement in the Top 15

=== Fast Track Events ===
Fast track winners automatically advanced to the Top 15.

Position	Contestants	Ref
Multimedia Award	Vietnam - Đoàn Công Vinh	
People's Choice	Australia - Amit Singh Saini	

=== Special awards ===
Categories	Medalists	Finalists	Ref
Best in National Costume	(gold) India – Lavesh Mohan Bharambe; (silver) Philippines – Kenneth Vincent Cabungcal; (bronze) Ecuador – Sebastian Mora; (bronze) Singapore – Joyner Samson	Colombia - David Linares; Eritrea - Paulos Tecle; Indonesia - Arya Dimas Aditya; Malaysia - Edison Ho; Venezuela - Sergio Azuaga; Vietnam - Đoàn Công Vinh	
Best in Swimwear	(gold) Venezuela – Sergio Azuaga; (silver) France – Gwen Jegouzo; (bronze) India – Lavesh Mohan Bharambe	Brazil - Miguel Leles; Czech Republic - Rostislav Procházka; Ecuador - Sebastian Mora; South Korea - Min Seong Kim; Philippines - Kenneth Vincent Cabungcal; Puerto Rico - Fernando Ezequiel Padín; United Kingdom - Kazim Keskin	
Best in Beachwear	(gold) Puerto Rico – Fernando Ezequiel Padín; (silver) Philippines – Kenneth Vincent Cabungcal; (bronze) Ecuador – Sebastian Mora	Brazil - Miguel Leles; France - Gwen Jegouzo; India - Lavesh Mohan Bharambe; Indonesia - Arya Dimas Aditya; South Korea - Min Seong Kim; United Kingdom - Kazim Keskin; Venezuela - Sergio Azuaga	
Best in Formal Wear	(gold) Philippines – Kenneth Vincent Cabungcal; (silver) France – Gwen Jegouzo; (bronze) Eritrea - Paulos Tecle	Australia - Amit Singh Saini; Brazil - Miguel Leles; Ecuador - Sebastian Mora; India - Lavesh Mohan Bharambe; Puerto Rico - Fernando Ezequiel Padín; Singapore - Joyner Samson; Venezuela - Sergio Azuaga	
Fashion of the World	(gold) Indonesia - Arya Dimas Aditya; (silver) Philippines - Kenneth Vincent Cabungcal; (bronze) Vietnam - Đoàn Công Vinh	Australia - Amit Singh Saini; Brazil - Miguel Leles; Dominican Republic - Junior Mendoza; Ecuador - Sebastian Mora; France - Gwen Jegouzo; India - Lavesh Mohan Bharambe; Spain - Sergio Avila	
Mister Photogenic	(gold) Spain - Sergio Avila; (silver) South Korea - Min Seong Kim; (bronze) Australia - Amit Singh Saini; (bronze) Malaysia - Edison Ho	Brazil - Miguel Leles; France - Gwen Jegouzo; India - Lavesh Mohan Bharambe; Philippines - Kenneth Vincent Cabungcal; Puerto Rico - Fernando Ezequiel Padín; United Kingdom -Kazim Keskin	
Mister Personality	(gold) Côte d'Ivoire - Desire Kouassi; (silver) Cambodia - Siphun Rith; (silver) Singapore – Joyner Samson; (bronze) Colombia - David Linares	Eritrea - Paulos Tecle; Italy - Nicolas Maggi; South Korea - Min Seong Kim; Malaysia - Edison Ho; Philippines - Kenneth Vincent Cabungcal; Vietnam - Đoàn Công Vinh	
Mister Congeniality	(gold) Ecuador – Sebastian Mora; (gold) Czech Republic - Rostislav Procházka; (silver) Philippines – Kenneth Vincent Cabungcal; (bronze) Morocco – Simo Mansouri	Australia - Amit Singh Saini; Brazil - Miguel Leles; Cambodia - Siphun Rith; Eritrea - Paulos Tecle; Puerto Rico - Fernando Ezequiel Padín; Vietnam - Đoàn Công Vinh	
Best Physique	(gold) Brazil – Miguel Leles; (silver) Vietnam – Đoàn Công Vinh; (bronze) United Kingdom – Kazim Keskin	Cambodia - Siphun Rith; Colombia - David Linares; Côte d'Ivoire - Desire Kouassi; Eritrea - Paulos Tecle; France - Gwen Jegouzo; Malaysia - Edison Ho; Philippines - Kenneth Vincent Cabungcal	
Best in Arrival Outfit	(gold) France - Gwen Jegouzo; (silver) Brazil - Miguel Leles; (bronze) Czech Republic - Rostislav Procházka	Côte d'Ivoire - Desire Kouassi; Morocco - Simo Mansouri; Philippines - Kenneth Vincent Cabungcal; Puerto Rico - Fernando Ezequiel Padín; Spain - Sergio Avila; United Kingdom - Kazim Keskin; Vietnam - Đoàn Công Vinh	
Press Favorite	(gold) Venezuela – Sergio Azuaga; (gold) Philippines – Kenneth Vincent Cabungcal; (silver) Ecuador – Sebastian Mora; (bronze) France - Gwen Jegouzo	Australia - Amit Singh Saini; Cambodia - Siphun Rith; Colombia - David Linares; Dominican Republic - Junior Mendoza; Italy - Nicolas Maggi; Malaysia - Edison Ho	
Man of Travel - Holiday Inn Express Manila	Philippines – Kenneth Vincent Cabungcal		

== Contestants ==
Twenty-three contestants competed for the title.

Country/Territory	Contestant	Hometown
Australia	Amit Singh Saini	Melbourne
Brazil	Cassio Miguel Leles De Souza	Cuiabá
Cambodia	Siphun Rith	Banteay Meanchey
Colombia	David Alexander Linares Solís	Pasto
Côte d'Ivoire	M’Bra Koffiba Desire Kouassi	Abidjan
Czech Republic	Rostislav Procházka	Znojmo
Dominican Republic	Junior Radhames Mendoza Taveras	New York
Ecuador	Sebastián Mora	Puyo
Eritrea	Paulos Tecle	Asmara
France	Gwen Jegouzo	Rennes
India	Lavesh Mohan Bharambe	Pune
Indonesia	Arya Dimas Aditya	Palembang
Italy	Nicolas Maggi	Rome
South Korea	Min Seong Kim	Goyang
Malaysia	Edison Ho	Selangor
Morocco	Simo Mansouri	Khemisset
Philippines	Kenneth Vincent Cabungcal	Dumaguete
Puerto Rico	Fernando Ezequiel Padín Rodríguez	Isabela
Singapore	Joyner Canlas Samson	Thomson
Spain	Sergio Ávila López	Granada
United Kingdom	Kazim Keskin	London
Venezuela	Sergio Alejandro Azuaga Piñango	Caracas
Vietnam	Đoàn Công Vinh	Tây Ninh

== Notes ==
=== Crossover ===
Mister Heritage International

- 2024: Morocco - Simo Mansouri (2nd Runner-Up)

Mister Cosmopolitan

- 2023: Italy - Nicolas Maggi (Top 8)

Mister Grand International

- 2021: Puerto Rico - Fernando Ezequiel Padín (Winner)

Mister Real Universe

- 2017: Puerto Rico - Fernando Ezequiel Padín (2nd Runner-Up)
