= Mister Venezuela 1998 =

3rd Mister Venezuela pageant

- Date: October 29, 1998
- Presenters: Maite Delgado
- Entertainment: Christina Dieckmann; Gabriela Vergara; Daniel Sarcos; Beba Rojas; Mercurio; Lilibeth Morillo
- Venue: Estudio 1 de Venevisión, Caracas, Venezuela
- Broadcaster: International: Univisión; DirecTV; Official broadcaster: Venevisión
- Entrants: 24
- Placements: 5
- Winner: Ernesto Calzadilla; Distrito Federal
- Photogenic: Numa Delgado (Distrito Federal)

Mister Venezuela 1998 was the third Mister Venezuela pageant. It was held at the Estudio 1 de Venevisión in Caracas, Venezuela on October 29, 1998.

At the end of the event, Sandro Finoglio of Distrito Federal titled Ernesto Calzadilla of Distrito Federal as Mister Venezuela 1998. He represented Venezuela at the Manhunt International 1999 pageant, winning the first title for the country.

The runner-up position went to Numa Delgado, also from Distrito Federal.

== Pageant ==
=== Selection committee ===
The judges for Mister Venezuela include:

- Irene Ferreira – Miss World Venezuela 1994 and 2nd runner-up in Miss World 1994
- Beatriz Russo – Pomar Wineries executive
- María José Villaseco – Model and Miss Bolívar 1988
- Porti Amsel – Minelli Co. vice-president
- Bárbara Pérez – Miss International Venezuela 1998
- Nayadeth Peche – ArchiMóbil company vice-president
- Carolina Perpetuo – Actress and Miss Miranda 1986
- Carmen Montoya – Eurobuilding Hotel public relations manager
- Shirley Bulca – University of Geneva Faculty of Languages dean
- Maruja Beracasa – Miss Venezuela Ladies' Committee president and antiquarian
- Margarita Zingg – Fashion designer
- Sonia Roffé – Miss Venezuela Organization dermatologist
- Caridad Canelón – Actress
- Carolina Morales – Sportswear designer
- Viviana Gibelli – Actress, TV Host and 2nd runner-up in Miss Venezuela 1987
- Veruska Ramírez – Miss Venezuela 1997 and 1st runner-up in Miss Universe 1998

== Results ==
Color key

- Declared as winner
- Ended as runner-up
- Ended as top 5/8 qualification
- Ended as one of the finalists or semifinalists
- Ended as special awards winner

Placement	Contestant	International placement
Mister Venezuela 1998	Distrito Federal (No. 15) – Ernesto Calzadilla	Manhunt International 1999
1st runner-up	Distrito Federal (No. 14) – Numa Delgado	
2nd runner-up	Zulia (No. 4) – Nadir Nery	Grasim Mr. International 1999
Top 5	Distrito Federal (No. 12) – Daniel Andrade (3rd runner-up); Distrito Federal (No. 18) – Diego Ochoa (4th runner-up)	

=== International Male Model Venezuela 2000 ===
Placement	Contestant	International placement
International Male Model Venezuela 2000	Distro Federal (No. 18) – Diego Ochoa	2nd runner-up – International Male Model 2000

=== Mr. Handsome International Venezuela 1999 ===
Placement	Contestant	International placement
Mr. Handsome International Venezuela 1999	(No. 9) – Emilio Navas	Mr. Handsome International 1999 (Coche Island representative)

=== Special award ===
Placement	Contestant
Mister Photogenic	Distrito Federal (No. 14) – Numa Delgado

== Contestants ==
24 contestants competed for the title.

No.	Contestant	Age (Note: Ages at the time of the pageant)	Height	Hometown
1	Ismael Abuhazi García	19		
2	David Rodríguez	24		Caracas
3	William Álvarez	24		
4	Nadir Nery Djukich	24		
5	Humberto Glaffó	25		
6	Rubén Aguilar	21		
7	Luis Guillermo Castellanos García	24		
8	Francisco Rodríguez	27		
9	Emilio Navas	22		
10	Iván Pineda	22		
11	Yul Louis Pinto Ayala	23		Caracas
12	Daniel Andrade	19		
13	Pedro Pablo Peña	25		Boconó
14	Numa Aurelio Ambrosio Delgado	22		
15	Juan Ernesto Calzadilla Regalado	24		
16	José Castillo	23		Caracas
17	Carlos Rincón	22		
18	Diego Leonardo Ochoa Muñóz	22		
19	Rodolfo Alberto Amundaray Habibe	21		
20	Reynaldo Andrés Brito Hurtado	26		Caracas
21	Alexander Cuellar	22		
22	Jean Carlos Méndez	19		
23	Jesús Enrique Ghio Hernández	18		
24	Horacio Vincencio Montenegro Rizzo	20		

Notes

- Ernesto Calzadilla (No. 15) won Manhunt International 1999 in Manila, Philippines and then became an actor.
- Nadir Nery (No. 4) won Grasim Mr. International 1999 in New Delhi, India.
- Diego Ochoa (No. 18) placed as 2nd runner-up in the International Male Model 2000 competition in Oranjestad, Aruba.
- Emilio Navas (No. 9) won Mister Handsome International 1999 in Punta Cana, Dominican Republic.
- Numa Delgado (No. 14) and Diego Ochoa (No. 18) became models.
