= Jeudiel Condado =

Venezuelan model and male beauty pageant titleholder

- Born: Jeudiel Enrique Condado Grimán; May 11, 1990 (age 36); San Antonio de Los Altos, Miranda, Venezuela
- Occupations: Model; Photographer
- Height: 1.86 m (6 ft 1 in)
- Beauty pageant titleholder
- Title: Mister Supranational Venezuela 2018
- Hair color: Black
- Eye color: Brown
- Major competitions: Mister Universo Venezuela 2014 (1st Runner-Up); Mister Supranational 2018 (Unplaced)

Jeudiel Enrique Condado Grimán (born May 11, 1990) is a Venezuelan business administrator, model and male beauty pageant titleholder. He was Mister Supranational Venezuela 2018 and represented Venezuela at Mister Supranational 2018 where was unplaced.

== Life and career ==
=== Early life ===
Condado was born in San Antonio de Los Altos, Miranda, Venezuela. He obtained a degree in Business Administration and Economics from the Doctor Federico Rivero Palacio University Institute of Technology and a diploma in Quality Management from the Andrés Bello Catholic University. Jeudiel is also a model and photographer, and has stood out for his advertising work in the field of fashion.

=== Pageantry ===
==== Mister Universe Venezuela 2014 ====
Condado's first foray into beauty pageants was by participating in the Mister Universo Venezuela. On that occasion, Jeudiel represented the Miranda state.

The final night of Mister Universo Venezuela 2014 was held on November 4, 2014, at the Teatro Principal de la Hermandad Gallega in Caracas, with Jeudiel finishing in second place, obtaining the title of Mister Universo World Venezuela 2014; while the winner was Christian Nunes.

==== Mister Venezuela 2015 ====
Jeudiel participated in Mister Venezuela 2015, an event held on May 23, 2015, at the Venevisión studios in Caracas. In that edition the candidates were assigned numbers instead of state bands; Condado was assigned #3.

On June 5, 2018, the contest coach Miguel Méndez, who replaces the Miss Venezuela Organization as the holder of the Mister Supranational franchise for Venezuela, decides to appoint Jeudiel as the Venezuelan representative to the Mister Supranational 2018.

==== Mister Supranational 2018 ====
Condado represented Venezuela in the Mister Supranacional 2018 contest on December 8, 2018, at the Municipal Sports and Recreation Center MOSIR, in Krynica-Zdrój, Nowy Sącz, Poland, where Condado unplaced.

=== Other projects ===
In 2020, Jeudiel started in the city where he resides, New York, a marketing project in digital business interaction, aimed especially at companies in the fashion area.

Awards and achievements
Preceded by (Venezuela) Gabriel Correa Guzmán	Mister Supranational Venezuela; 2018	Succeeded by (Venezuela) Leonardo Carrero
Preceded by Raulmer Barreto (Amazonas)	Mister Universe World Venezuela; 1st Runner-Up; 2014	Succeeded by Jesús Alberto Malaver (Nueva Esparta)
