= Gabriel Correa (model) =

Venezuelan model and Mister Venezuela 2015

- Born: Gabriel José Correa Guzmán; February 17, 1989 (age 37); Maracay, Aragua, Venezuela
- Occupations: Model; Actor
- Height: 1.88 m (6 ft 2 in)
- Beauty pageant titleholder
- Hair color: Brown
- Eye color: Brown
- Major competitions: Mister Venezuela 2015 (Winner); Mister Supranational 2017 (Winner)

Gabriel José Correa Guzmán (born 17 February 1989 in Maracay) is a Venezuelan actor, model, former baseball player and beauty pageant titleholder who was titled Mister Venezuela 2015 and Mister Supranational 2017.

== Biography ==
Gabriel was born in the city of Maracay. From an early age, he was interested in baseball, but in his career, he suffered a tendon injury to his right arm that forced him to quit playing and also prevented him from joining the big leagues He started work as a model in 2008, but put his career on hold to focus on his Industrial Production studies.

== Mister Venezuela ==
In 2015, Gabriel participated in the 14th edition of the Mister Venezuela competition held on 23 May 2015 at Venevisión studios in Caracas. At the end of the competition, he won the title of Mister Venezuela.

== Acting ==
After joining Venevisión, Gabriel was cast in the upcoming telenovela to be produced by the network titled Entre tu amor y mi amor making his debut in acting. In 2016, Gabriel joined the Acting Studio in Miami to continue improving on his acting skills.

== Filmography ==
Telenovelas
| Year | Title | Role |
|---|---|---|
| 2016 | Entre tu amor y mi amor | Víctor Hugo Monserrat |

Awards and achievements
| Preceded by (Mexico) Diego Garcy | Mister Supranational; 2017 | Succeeded by (India) Prathamesh Maulingkar |
| Preceded by (Venezuela) Gustavo Acevedo | Mister Supranational Venezuela; 2017 | Succeeded by (Venezuela) Jeudiel Condado |
| Preceded by (Barinas, Venezuela) Jesús Casanova | Mister Venezuela; 2015 | Succeeded by (Aragua) Renato Barabino |
