= Gustavo Acevedo =

Venezuelan model and male beauty pageant titleholder

- Born: Gustavo Alejandro Acevedo Nicolazzo; 3 January 1997 (age 29); Caracas, Venezuela
- Occupations: Model; Sport television presenter
- Height: 1.88 m (6 ft 2 in)
- Beauty pageant titleholder
- Title: Mister Supranational Venezuela 2016
- Hair color: Brown
- Eye color: Green
- Major competitions: Mister Venezuela 2016 (2nd Runner-Up); Mister Supranational 2016 (Top 10)

Gustavo Alejandro Acevedo Nicolazzo (born 3 January 1997) is a Venezuelan medicine student, model and male beauty pageant titleholder. He was Mister Supranational Venezuela 2016 and represented Venezuela at the inaugural edition of Mister Supranational at Mister Supranational 2016 where he finished as one of the Top 10 finalists.

== Life and career ==
=== Early life ===
Acevedo was born in Caracas, Venezuela. He holds a degree in cardiovascular and respiratory therapy from the Central University of Venezuela. Acevedo is also a model, actor, boxer, Pan-American champion mixed martial artist and has served as a sports narrator on local television in his hometown.

=== Pageantry ===
==== Mister Venezuela 2016 ====
In 2016, Gustavo participated in the 13th edition of the Mister Venezuela event held on May 28, 2016 at Venevisión studios in Caracas. The candidates were assigned numbers instead of state bands, with Acevedo being assigned #2. He ended as the 2nd runner-up. The winner was Renato Barabino, while the first runner-up was Walfred Crespo.

Later that year, he was appointed by the Miss Venezuela Organization as the first ever Mister Supranational Venezuela.

==== Mister Supranational 2016 ====
He represented Venezuela at the Mister Supranational 2016 pageant held on December 3, 2016 in Krynica-Zdrój, Poland. Acevedo ended in sixth place.

Awards and achievements
Preceded by New title →	Mister Supranational; Top 10 Finalist (6th Place); 2016	Succeeded by (Malta) Justin Axiak
Preceded by New title →	Mister Supranational Venezuela; 2016	Succeeded by (Venezuela) Gabriel Correa Guzmán
Preceded by Georges Biloune (Lara)	Mister Venezuela; 2nd Runner-Up; 2016	Succeeded by Adrián Menghini (Zulia)
