= Mister Venezuela 1997 =

2nd edition of the Mister Venezuela competition

- Date: April 8, 1997
- Presenters: Maite Delgado
- Entertainment: Falvio César; Manuel Andara, Héctor Ragussa, Javier Gómez, Rodolfo Renwick; Viviana Gibelli; Fey
- Venue: Estudio 1 de Venevisión, Caracas, Venezuela
- Broadcaster: International: Venevisión Continental; DirecTV; Official broadcaster: Venevisión
- Entrants: 20
- Placements: 5
- Winner: Sandro Finoglio; Distrito Federal

Mister Venezuela 1997 was the 2nd edition of the Mister Venezuela competition, held on April 8, 1997, at the Estudio 1 de Venevisión in Caracas, Venezuela.

At the end of the event, José Gregorio Faría of Zulia titled his successor Sandro Finoglio of Distrito Federal as Mister Venezuela 1997.

The 1st Runner-Up position went to Guillermo Pérez also from Distrito Federal.

== Results ==
Color key

- Declared as winner
- Ended as runner-up
- Ended as top 5/8 qualification
- Ended as one of the finalists or semifinalists
- Ended as special awards winner

Placement	Contestant	International placement
Mister Venezuela 1997	Distrito Federal (#11) – Sandro Finoglio	1st Runner-Up – Manhunt International 1997
Mister Venezuela 1997	Distrito Federal (#11) – Sandro Finoglio	Mister World 1998
1st Runner-Up	Distrito Federal (#16) – Guillermo Pérez	

=== Mr. Grasim International Venezuela 1998 ===
Placement	Contestant	International placement
Mr. Grasim International Venezuela 1998	Trujillo (#13) – Alexander Castellanos (2nd Runner-Up)	Top 6 (3rd Runner-Up) – Grasim Mr. International 1998

=== Mr. Handsome International Venezuela 2000 ===
Placement	Contestant	International placement
Mr. Handsome International Venezuela 2000	Trujillo (#13) – Alexander Castellanos (2nd Runner-Up)	Mister Tourism International – Mr. Handsome International 2000

== Pageant ==
=== Selection committee ===
==== Final telecast ====
- Ana Julia Thompson – Fashion designer
- Elia Christina Sala – Caracas high society lady
- Sonia Roffé – Miss Venezuela Organization dermatologist
- Jacqueline Aguilera – Miss World Venezuela 1995 and Miss World 1995
- Magaly Mujica – Model
- Johana Calvera – Nuesta Belleza pageant coordinator
- Maria Joana Parizotto – Miss Brazil 1996 and Nuestra Belleza Internacional 1996
- Minogue d'Renacher – French fashion designers representative in Venezuela
- Carolina Perpetuo – Actress and Miss Miranda 1986
- Lily Galdo – Univision special event manager
- Gabriela Spanic – Actress and Miss Guárico 1992
- Rosalinda Serfaty – Actress
- Ana Cepinska – Miss World Venezuela 1996 and Top 5 in Miss World 1996
- Maruja Beracasa – Miss Venezuela Ladies' Committee president and antiquarian
- Nayadeth Peche – ArchiMóbil company vicepresident
- Porti Amsel – Minelli Co. vicepresident
- Carmen Montoya – Eurobuilding Hotel public relations manager
- Alejandra D'Zaima – Grupo Lony representative
- Irene Zingg – Jewelry designer

== Contestants ==
20 contestants competed for the title.

#	Contestant	Age (Note: Ages at the time of the pageant)	Height	Hometown
1	Juan Andrés Trivella			
2	Ismael Matamoros			Caracas
3	Mircea Szabo			
5	Alejandro Sambade			
6	Josué Delgado			
7	Guillermo Aristimuño			
8	Rodrigo Rodríguez			
9	Héctor Sánchez			
10	Alejandro Pérez			
11	Sandro Finocchio Speranza	24	1.88 m (6 ft 2 in)	Caracas
12	Alfredo Nania			
13	Luis Alexander Castellanos García			Boconó
14	Carlos Gómez			
15	Rafael Maita			
16	Guillermo José Pérez Rupérez	26		Caracas
17	Juan Manuel Linares			
18	Alessandro Geremías			
19	Luis Alexander Padrón			
20	Javier Alejandro Faoro Mijares			Caracas
21	Ramón Rico			

Notes

- Sandro Finoglio (#11) placed as 1st Runner-Up in Manhunt International 1997 in Singapore and later won Mister World 1998 in Grândola, Portugal.
- Guillermo Pérez (#16) and Sandro Finoglio (#11) became actors.
- Jorge Plaz (#4), Antonio Selvaggio and Henry Torell retired from the competition.
