= Jessus Zambrano =

Venezuelan actor, model, and male beauty pageant titleholder

- Born: December 22, 1989 (age 36); Abejales, Táchira, Venezuela
- Education: The Neighborhood Playhouse School of the Theater
- Occupations: Actor, Filmmaker, Model
- Modeling information
- Height: 1.88 m (6 ft 2 in)
- Hair color: Brown
- Eye color: Brown

Jesus Alberto Zambrano Contreras (Jessus Zambrano) (born in Abejales, Táchira, Venezuela on December 22, 1989) is a Venezuelan model and actor who was selected Mister Venezuela in 2012. He obtained the title of Mister Venezuela 2012 after being chosen by local Mister World franchiseholder, Osmel Sousa. The next year he was known for his starring role on the hit television series "Los Secretos de Lucia” which aired in 2013 to audiences around the world through Venevision Network. He is 188 cm (6 ft 2 in) tall.

Zambrano represented Venezuela at the Mister World 2012 pageant in Kent, England, on November 24, 2012.

== Filmography ==
Film
Year	Title	Role	Director	Reference
2022	La Trampa	Diego	Frank Perozo	
2020	Greencard	Andres Mora	Jessus Zambrano	
2020	Lady Gaga's "911"	Bystander	Tarsem Singh	
2019	Umbra	Angel	Zarha Shahhatami	
2016	La Petite Mort	Hermes	Anna Maria Alaimo	

== Television ==
TV show
Year	Title	Role	Reference
2017	Desiciones	Sebastian Leon	
2017	Mil formas de amar	Pedro	
2013	Los secretos de Lucia	Agente Moreno	

TV Host
Year	Title	Network
2015	Mister Venezuela	Venevisión
2015, 2014	Miss Zulia	Venevisión Plus
2014-2011	Miss Lara	Venevisión Plus
2014	Gran Modelo Venezuela	
2014	Miss Caribbean Venezuela	
2011	Miss Maja Colombia	Citytv Bogotá

Awards and achievements
Preceded by José Manuel Flores (Caracas)	Mister Venezuela; 2012	Succeeded by Jesús Casanova (Barinas)
