= Mister Venezuela 2006 =

10th Mister Venezuela pageant

- Date: September 23, 2006
- Presenters: Mariángel Ruiz
- Venue: Estudio 1 de Venevisión, Caracas, Venezuela
- Broadcaster: International: Univisión; Venevisión Continental; DirecTV; Official broadcaster: Venevisión
- Entrants: 6
- Placements: 1
- Winner: Vito Gasparrini; Distrito Capital

Mister Venezuela 2006 was the tenth Mister Venezuela pageant. It was held at the Estudio 1 de Venevisión in Caracas, Venezuela on September 23, 2006.

At the end of the event, José Ignacio Rodríguez of Zulia titled Vito Gasparrini of Distrito Capital as Mister Venezuela 2006. He represented Venezuela at the Mister World 2007 pageant.

The runner-up position went to José Luis Porras of Distrito Capital.

== Results ==
Color key

- Declared as winner
- Ended as runner-up
- Ended as top 5/8 qualification
- Ended as one of the finalists or semifinalists
- Ended as special awards winner

Placement	Contestant	International placement
Mister Venezuela 2006	Distrito Capital (No. 4) – Vito Gasparrini	Unplaced – Mister World 2007

== Contestants ==
Six contestants competed for the title.

No.	Contestant	Age (Note: Ages at the time of the pageant)	Height	Hometown	Notes
1	Marco Aurelio Ravelo Rodríguez	22	1.91 m (6 ft 3 in)	Caracas	Unplaced – Mister Venezuela 2004 (Trujillo); Top 15 – Mister Handsome Venezuela 2005
2	José Luis Porras Duarte	22	1.87 m (6 ft 1 1/2 in)	Caracas	1st runner-up – Mister Venezuela 2005 (Portuguesa)
3	Luis Enrique Machado Márquez	21	1.93 m (6 ft 4 in)	Maturín	Unplaced – Mister Venezuela 2005 (Monagas)
4	Vito Gasparrini	30	1.92 m (6 ft 3 1/2 in)	Caracas	Top 10 – Mister Venezuela 2003 (Mérida)
5	Alberto Bahamonde	34	1.90 m (6 ft 3 in)	Caracas	Top 5 – Mister Venezuela 1996
6	Marco Antonio Vilera González	23	1.86 m (6 ft 1 in)	Caracas	Unplaced – Mister Venezuela 2004 (Yaracuy)

Notes

- Vito Gasparrini (No. 4) unplaced in Mister World 2007 in Sanya, China.
