= Mister Grand International 2023 =

6th pageant of Mister Grand International

- Date: January 14, 2024
- Venue: Casa De La Cultura Hinojos, Huelva, Spain
- Broadcaster: YouTube / Facebook
- Entrants: 21
- Placements: 16
- Debuts: Bahamas; Belgium; Brazil; Cambodia; Colombia; Ecuador; Ethiopia; Spain; France; Haiti; Honduras; India; Italy; South Korea; Kosovo; Lebanon; Martinique; Nepal; Panama; Poland; Puerto Rico; Czech Republic; Dominican Republic; Sierra Leone; Singapore; Sri Lanka; Thailand; Trinidad and Tobago; Venezuela; Vietnam
- Winner: Seif Al Walid Harb; Lebanon
- Personality: Blerim Asani (Kosovo)
- Best National Costume: Sean Sirinutt Cholvibool (Thailand)

Mister Grand International 2023 was the sixth Mister Grand International competition, held at the Casa De La Cultura Hinojos in Huelva, Spain, on January 15, 2024.

Michael Pelletier Mister Grand International 2022 of Switzerland handed his title to Seif Al Walid Harb of Lebanon as his successor at the end of the event.

== Background ==
Originally, Vietnam was announced as the host country for the 2023 Mister Grand International edition by the organizer, Voyage Group, on Sunday evening. However, on January 15, 2024, the venue was changed to Casa De La Cultura Hinojos in Huelva, Spain.

== Results ==
Placements	Contestant	Ref.
Mister Grand International 2023	Lebanon – Seif Al Walid Harb	
1st Runner-Up	Singapore – Igor Cheban	
2nd Runner-Up	Thailand – Sirinutt Sean Cholvibool	
3rd Runner-Up	Poland – Michal Kalcowski	
4th Runner-Up	Korea – Hwang Jung Sung	
5th Runner-Up	Philippines – Jesus Guinto	
Top 12	Brazil – Marcio Camargos; France – Bastien Chaubet; Italy – Alex Pucino; Spain – Asier Garcia; Venezuela – Jesus Rinçon; Vietnam – Nguyễn Hoang Tung	
Top 16	Belgium – Luciano Camara; Colombia – Juan Se Hurtado; Czech Republic – Matteo Lucano; Dominican Republic – Fernando Nolasco	

=== Mister Grand International 2023 (Brazil-based) results ===
This is the results of Mister Grand International that was based in Brazil.

Placements

Sixth Edition
Placement	Contestant
Mister Grand International 2023	Mexico – Damián Buenrostro

Sixth Edition
Placement	Contestant
Mister Teen Grand International 2023	Brazil – Vinicius Arruda

== Contestants ==
32 candidates competed for the title of Mister Grand International 2023.

Country/territory	Candidates	Continent
Bahamas	Vjaughn Ingraham	Caribbean
Belgium	Luciano Camara	Europe
Brazil	Marcio Camargos	Americas
Cambodia	Vutchy Touch	Asia
Colombia	Juan Sebastián Hurtado	Americas
Czech Republic	Matteo Lucano	Europe
Dominican Republic	Fernando Nolasco	Caribbean
Ecuador	Gesu Cacurri	Americas
Ethiopia	Amanuel Dangarsa Damene	Africa
France	Bastien Chaubet	Europe
Germany	Alex Demian	Europe
Haiti	Samuel Saint Juste	Caribbean
Honduras	Alerxon Mendez	Americas
India	Satya Vishwanadh	Asia
Italy	Alex Pucino	Europe
Kosovo	Blerim Asani	Europe
Lebanon	Seif Al Walid Harb	Asia
Martinique	Dermille Germe	Europe
Nepal	Millenium Shah	Asia
Panama	Carlos Pellicier	Americas
Philippines	Jesús Guinto	Asia
Poland	Michal Kalcowski	Europe
Puerto Rico	Julio Prieto	Caribbean
Sierra Leone	Saheed Saidu Gbla	Africa
Singapore	Igor Cheban	Asia
South Korea	Hwang Jun Sung	Asia
Spain	Asier Garcia	Europe
Sri Lanka	Ewan Tissara	Asia
Thailand	Sean Sirinutt Cholvibool	Asia
Trinidad and Tobago	Stephen Christian Bassano	Caribbean
Venezuela	Jesus Rinçon	Americas
Vietnam	Nguyen Hoang Tung	Asia

== Crossover ==
- Lebanon Seif Al Walid Harb — is a former contestant who represented Lebanon in Mister International 2023, held in Bangkok, Thailand, where he finished Top-20 and won the Best in Swimwear and Ayutthaya Popular Vote awards. He was also included in the lists of the Most Popular Men and the Most Charismatic Men.

== Controversies ==
On January 15, 2024, during the grand final event that took place in Spain, an awkward situation unfolded. The host country's representative's family members rushed onto the stage, creating a scandalous scene and causing chaos in the final night of the competition. They were not pleased by the result, as their contestant was not included in the top 6. The Councilor of Hinojos, honorable Macarena Cabello Alvarez, who sat as one of the judges and the Chief of Police of Hinojos came and pacified the scene immediately, and managed to continue the show with the support of the locals of Spain who showed that they are educated, well-mannered and very respectful of the outcome of the finals night. The next day, the Councilor from Villarasa, Honorable Irene Sanchez Bernal, who also sat as one of the judges said “As a 'onubense' I want to say that what happened yesterday does not represent Spain, nor Huelva, much less the municipalities of both Villarasa and Hinojos who accompanied & assisted Mister Grand International Team, staffs, members of the juries, National Directors, and families/supporters of the candidates, and made sure they are all safe & secured.

== See also ==
- List of beauty pageants
