= List of shipwrecks in January 1882 =

The list of shipwrecks in January 1882 includes ships sunk, foundered, grounded, or otherwise lost during January 1882.

== 2 January ==
List of shipwrecks: 2 January 1882
Ship	State	Description
Cronstadt	United Kingdom	The barque was wrecked on the Banjaard Sand, in the North Sea off the coast of Zeeland, Netherlands. Her crew survived. She was on a voyage from Moulmein, Burma to Rotterdam, South Holland, Netherlands.

== 3 January ==
List of shipwrecks: 3 January 1882
Ship	State	Description
Two Friends	United Kingdom	The brigantine was severely damaged by fire at Guernsey, Channel Islands.

== 4 January ==
List of shipwrecks: 4 January 1882
Ship	State	Description
Irene	Denmark	The barque ran aground on the Kentish Knock. She was on a voyage from Kristiansan to Barcelona, Spain. She was refloated the next day with assistance from the pilot cutter Alpha and the tug Rainbor (both United Kingdom) and taken in to Harwich, Essex, United Kingdom in a waterlogged condition.
Wenonah	United Kingdom	The yacht was driven ashore at Vlissingen, Zeeland, Netherlands. She was refloated.

== 5 January ==
List of shipwrecks: 5 January 1882
Ship	State	Description
Anglian	United Kingdom	The steamship ran aground in the Solent. She was on a voyage from the Cape of Good Hope, Cape Colony to Southampton, Hampshire. She was refloated and completed her voyage.
Ballina	United Kingdom	The steamship departed from Liverpool, Lancashire for Larne, County Antrim. Presumed subsequently foundered with the loss of all fifteen crew; a boat from the ship subsequently washed up near Whitehaven, Cumberland. The bodies of three of her crew washed up on the coasts of Cumberland, Kirkcudbrightshire and in Ramsey Bay, Isle of Man.
Bandeira Moro	Italy	The barque ran aground on the Gunfleet Sand, in the North Sea off the coast of Essex, United Kingdom. She was on a voyage from London to Newcastle upon Tyne, Northumberland, United Kingdom. She was refloated with the assistance of a tug and smacks and taken in to Harwich, Essex in a leaky condition. She subsequently put back to London.
Edward Hvindt	Norway	The barque was wrecked on "Bril", Netherlands East Indies. She was on a voyage from Makassar, Netherlands East Indies to Bahia, Brazil.
Edwin & Sarah	United Kingdom	The ketch was abandoned in the English Channel 3 nautical miles (5.6 km) south south west of Portland, Dorset. Her crew survived. She was on a voyage from Plymouth, Devon to Portsmouth, Hampshire. She came ashore and was wrecked at Chesil Beach, Dorset.
Louisa	Germany	The brig ran aground on the Haisborough Sands, in the North Sea off the coast of Norfolk, United Kingdom. Six of the nine people on board were rescued by the Winterton Lifeboat. Three others took to a boat, they were reported missing, presumed dead. Louisa capsized after being abandoned. She was on a voyage from Hull, Yorkshire to Plymouth, Devon, United Kingdom.
Strathgarry	United Kingdom	The steamship was driven ashore on Piel Island, Lancashire and holed. She was on a voyage from Barrow-in-Furness, Lancashire to Glasgow, Renfrewshire. She was refloated.
Trosser	United Kingdom	The trow struck the Severn Railway Bridge and sank at Gatcombe, Gloucestershire with the loss of one life. She was on a voyage from Bridgwater, Somerset to Newnham, Gloucestershire.

== 6 January ==
List of shipwrecks: 6 January 1882
Ship	State	Description
Billow	United Kingdom	The schooner capsized in the North Sea 15 nautical miles (28 km) south west of Souter Point, Northumberland. She was abandoned by her crew, who were rescued by the smack Alfred and Lizzie (United Kingdom). Her captain remained aboard. Alfred and Lizzie took Billow in tow. She was assisted in to Scarborough, North Riding of Yorkshire by the steamship Flying Harrow (United Kingdom) on 14 January.
Claremont	United Kingdom	The brigantine was driven ashore at Troon, Ayrshire. She was refloated on 24 January and towed in to Troon.
Elizabeth	United Kingdom	The smack was driven ashore and wrecked on Càrna. Her crew were rescued.
Grand Tower	United States	The steamship struck a snag near Goose Island in the Mississippi River and sank with the loss of four lives.
Kate	United Kingdom	The lighter foundered off Skelmorlie, Ayrshire. Her crew were rescued.
Lion	United Kingdom	The steamship, a sealer, foundered in the Atlantic Ocean with the loss of all 53 crew. She was on a voyage from Greenock, Renfrewshire to Saint John's, Newfoundland Colony.
Marguerite	United Kingdom	The steamship foundered in the Atlantic Ocean 100 nautical miles (190 km) west of the Isles of Scilly. Her crew took to two boats; they were rescued. Marguerite was on a voyage from Algiers, Algeria to the Clyde.
North Eastern	United Kingdom	The steamship departed from Granton, Lothian for Copenhagen, Denmark. No further trace, presumed foundered with the loss of all hands, about twenty lives.
R. M. Hunton	United Kingdom	The steamship struck the Cockburn Rock, in the Bristol Channel, and sank about 1 1/2 nautical miles (2.8 km) off Avonmouth, Somerset. Her crew were rescued.
S. R. and H.	United Kingdom	The schooner ran aground on the Shoebury Sand, in the Thames Estuary. She was on a voyage from the Newfoundland Colony to London. She was refloated with the assistance of a tug and towed into the River Thames.

== 7 January ==
List of shipwrecks: 7 January 1882
Ship	State	Description
Impetuous	United Kingdom	The collier was driven ashore at Rye, Sussex with the loss of two of the four people on board.
Judithe	Norway	The galiot was taken in to Bergen in a waterlogged condition. She was on a voyage from Trondheim to Kirkcaldy, Fife, United Kingdom.
Loch Awe	United Kingdom	The steamship foundered in the Skaggerak. Her crew were rescued by the steamship August Blanche (Sweden). She was on a voyage from Burntisland, Fife to Aarhus, Denmark.
Nancy	United Kingdom	The barge collided with the steamship Preussischer Adler (Germany) and sank off the Blackrock Lighthouse, County Cork.
Nordstjernen	Norway	The brig was abandoned in the North Sea 60 nautical miles (110 km) off the Danish coast. Her crew were rescued by the smack Balaclava (United Kingdom. Nordstjernen was on a voyage from Arendal to Hull, Yorkshire, United Kingdom.

== 8 January ==
List of shipwrecks: 8 January 1882
Ship	State	Description
Arbroath	United Kingdom	The steamship was driven onto rocks at Lindisfarne, Northumberland and sank. Her crew took to the boats; they were rescued by a tug.
City of Limerick	United Kingdom	The steamship departed from New York for London. No further trace.
Dronning Sophie	Norway	The steamship was run into and severely damaged at South Shields, County Durham, United Kingdom and was severely damaged. She was on a voyage from South Shields to Bergen.
Leonora	Germany)	The brigantine was abandoned in the Atlantic Ocean. Her seven crew were rescued by the steamship Loanda (United Kingdom). Leonora was on a voyage from Sierra Leone to Falmouth, Cornwall, United Kingdom.
Unnamed	United Kingdom	The schooner sank in the North Sea 1 1/2 nautical miles (2.8 km) north north east of Emmanuel Head, Holy Island, Northumberland.

== 9 January ==
List of shipwrecks: 9 January 1882
Ship	State	Description
Elizabeth	United Kingdom	The ship struck rocks and sank at Lindisfarne, Northumberland. Her cre took to a boat; they were rescued by the tug Powerful (United Kingdom). Elizabeth was on a voyage from Arbroath, Forfarshire to the River Tyne.
Johannes	Norway	The ship put in to Grimstad in a waterlogged condition. She was on a voyage from Fredrikstad to Bristol, Gloucestershire, United Kingdom.
Lina	Germany	The barque was wrecked at San Antonio, Chile. Her crew were rescued. She was on a voyage from Montevideo, Uruguay to Valparaíso, Chile.
Princess	United Kingdom	The brig was wrecked on the Haisborough Sands, in the North Sea off the coast of Norfolk. Her crew got aboard the Haisborough Lightship ( Trinity House).
Thomas Vaughan	United Kingdom	The steamship foundered in Jack Sound.
Tre Venner	Norway	The barque was wrecked at Blokhus, Denmark. She was on a voyage from Christiania to Dieppe, Seine-Inférieure, France.
Unnamed	Flag unknown	The steamship foundered in the Atlantic Ocean with the loss of all hands. Witnessed by George Peabody (United States).

== 10 January ==
List of shipwrecks: 10 January 1882
Ship	State	Description
Ariadne	Norway	The brig was driven ashore near Islandmagee, County Antrim, United Kingdom and was wrecked.
Cartvale	United Kingdom	The ship ran aground at Stromness, Orkney Islands. She was on a voyage from Glasgow, Renfrewshire to Aberdeen.
HMS Sylvia	Royal Navy	The survey vessel ran aground on the Red Sand, in the Thames Estuary 20 nautical miles (37 km) off Sheerness, Kent. She was refloated.

== 11 January ==
List of shipwrecks: 11 January 1882
Ship	State	Description
Æolus	Germany	The schooner was wrecked on the Hinder Bank, in the North Sea off the coast of Zeeland, Netherlands. Her crew were rescued. She was on a voyage from Hartlepool, County Durham, United Kingdom to "Wapoli".
Halden	Flag unknown	The ship was driven ashore on Terschelling, Friesland, Netherlands. She subsequently broke up.
Wilhelm	Denmark	The derelict schooner was discovered in the North Sea 220 nautical miles (410 km) east north east of the Spurn Lighthouse, Yorkshire, United Kingdom by a British fishing smack. She was towed in to the River Tyne on 16 January.

== 12 January ==
List of shipwrecks: 12 January 1882
Ship	State	Description
Huntingdon	United Kingdom	The steamship ran aground in the River Thames at Gravesend, Kent.
Magician	United Kingdom	The steamship ran aground at New Romney, Kent. She was on a voyage from Middlesbrough, Yorkshire to Liverpool, Lancashire. She was refloated with the assistance of a tug and resumed her voyage.
Malmechus	United Kingdom	The paddle steamer sank between Dämman and Jungfrun, Gotland with the loss of fifteen of the 23 people on board.
Regalia	(United Kingdom of Great Britain and Ireland) Jersey	The ship was driven ashore at Ballybay, County Monaghan. She was on a voyage from Morlaix, Finistère, France to Campbeltown, Argyllshire.
Riga	United Kingdom	The steamship ran aground in the River Tay. She was on a voyage from Dundee, Forfarshire to South Shields, County Durham. She was refloated and resumed her voyage.

== 13 January ==
List of shipwrecks: 13 January 1882
Ship	State	Description
Edward Svenson	Denmark	The schooner was driven ashore on South Uist, Orkney Islands, United Kingdom in a capsized condition.
Hertha	Germany	The steamship collided with Lizzie Burrell (United Kingdom) and sank in the North Sea 20 nautical miles (37 km) off Lowestoft, Suffolk, United Kingdom. Her crew were rescued by the smack Foam (United Kingdom. Hertha was on a voyage from Leith, Lothian, United Kingdom to Caen, Calvados, France.
Julia	(United Kingdom of Great Britain and Ireland) Guernsey	The ship ran aground in Paimmpol Bay and was damaged. She was on a voyage from Dahouët, Finistère to Guernsey. She was refloated.

== 14 January ==
List of shipwrecks: 14 January 1882
Ship	State	Description
Fosna, and George Wascoe	Norway; United Kingdom	The brig Fosna collided with the steamship George Wascoe and sank. Her crew were rescued by George Wascoe. Fosna was on a voyage from Cádiz, Spain to Norway. George Wascoe was on a voyage from South Shields, County Durham to Messina, Sicily, Italy. She put in to Lisbon, Portugal, where she sank the next day. Her seventeen crew survived.
Leader	United Kingdom	The schooner was driven ashore at Carrickfergus, County Antrim.
Swift	Norway	The brig was driven ashore in Druridge Bay. Her eight crew were rescued by the Cresswell Lifeboat. She was on a voyage from Kragerø to Sunderland, County Durham, United Kingdom.

== 15 January ==
List of shipwrecks: 15 January 1882
Ship	State	Description
Lanarkshire	United Kingdom	The steamship was wrecked on the Coddling Bank, in the Irish Sea off the coast of County Dublin. Her twenty crew survived. She was on a voyage from Glasgow, Renfrewshire to Lisbon, Portugal.
Stephanotis	Greece	The ship ran aground. She was on a voyage from Feodosiya, Russia to Antwerp, Belgium. She was refloated on 17 January and resumed her voyage.

== 16 January ==
List of shipwrecks: 16 January 1882
Ship	State	Description
Africa	Germany	The steamship ran aground in the Suez Canal. She was on a voyage from New York, United States to Nagasaki, Japan.
Mary Waters	United Kingdom	The ship ran aground on the Workington Bank, in the Irish Sea. She was on a voyage from London to Silloth, Cumberland. She was refloated and completed her voyage.
Vanguard	United Kingdom	The steamship put in to Lisbon, Portugal on fire. She was on a voyage from Buenos Aires, Argentina to Havre de Grâce, Seine-Inférieure, France. The fire was extinguished.

== 17 January ==
List of shipwrecks: 17 January 1882
Ship	State	Description
Bosphorus	United Kingdom	The ship was wrecked in the Mediterranean Sea off Homs, Ottoman Tripolitania with the loss of nine of her 22 crew.
Gem	Canada	The brigantine foundered in a storm off Port Morien, Nova Scotia, Canada.
Gem	United Kingdom	The ship was driven ashore in Cowbay, Newfoundland Colony. She was refloated and found to be severely leaky.

== 18 January ==
List of shipwrecks: 18 January 1882
Ship	State	Description
Annie	United Kingdom	The steamship ran aground on the Whitton Sand, in the Humber and broke her back. She was on a voyage from Goole, Yorkshire to Antwerp, Belgium. She was refloated the next day and taken in to Blacktoft, Yorkshire.
Forward	United Kingdom	The fishing smack was run down and sunk in the North Sea by the steamship Watergeus (Flag unknown) with the loss of two of her five crew. Survivors were rescued by Watergeus.
Hawkshope	United Kingdom	The barque struck a sunken wreck off the coast of Haiti and was wrecked with the loss of two of her crew. She was on a voyage from Aruba, Curaçao and Dependencies to Hull, Yorkshire.
Lloyd's	United Kingdom	The steamship ran aground at Copenhagen, Denmark. She was on a voyage from Newcastle upon Tyne, Northumberland to Copenhagen.
Louise	Denmark	The steamship was driven ashore at "Stevens". She was on a voyage from Libava, Courland Governorate to Hull, Yorkshire, United Kingdom.
Pfeil	Germany	The steamship collided with Baumwall (Germany) and sank off the mouth of the Oste.

== 19 January ==
List of shipwrecks: 19 January 1882
Ship	State	Description
Abbotsford	United Kingdom	The steamship ran aground 2 nautical miles (3.7 km) east of Burntisland, Fife. .
Petrel	United Kingdom	The steamship was driven ashore and wrecked at the Giants Causeway, County Antrim. Her crew were rescued. She was on a voyage from the River Foyle to Glasgow, Renfrewshire.

== 20 January ==
List of shipwrecks: 20 January 1882
Ship	State	Description
Corten	United Kingdom	The steamship ran aground on the Haisborough Sands, in the North Sea off the coast of Norfolk and was severely damaged. She was refloated with the assistance of a number of tugs and taken in to Great Yarmouth, Norfolk.
Flying Scotsman	United Kingdom	The steamship ran aground on the Stagwall, in the River Tees. She was on a voyage from Middlesbrough, Yorkshire to the River Tyne. She was refloated with the assistance of a tug and found to be severely damaged.
Henricho	Sweden	The barque was sunk in a collision with the steamship E. B. Ward, Jr. (United States) off Cape San Antonio, Cuba with the loss of six lives.
Kong Halfdan	Norway	The steamship was driven ashore at Skjervøya. She was later refloated and found to be severely leaky.
Lindesnaes	Norway	The barque caught fire in a drydock at Bremen, Germany whilst under repair.
Prinses Marie	Netherlands	The ship ran aground off Sheerness, Kent, United Kingdom. She was on a voyage from Vlissingen, Zeeland, Netherlands to Queenborough, Kent. She was refloated.

== 21 January ==
List of shipwrecks: 21 January 1882
Ship	State	Description
Charles Capper, and Lizzie	United Kingdom	The steamship Lizzie collided with the steamship Charles Capper and sank in the North Sea off Souter Point, Northumberland. Charles Capper was on a voyage from South Shields, County Durham to London. Severely damaged, she put in to the River Tyne in a waterlogged condition.

== 22 January ==
For the capsize and sinking of the German barque Excelsior on this date, see the entry for 26 November 1881.

List of shipwrecks: 22 January 1882
Ship	State	Description
Kate	United Kingdom	The schooner collided with the steamship Gassendi (United Kingdom) and sank in Cardigan Bay. Her crew were rescued.
Sourabaya	France	The barque was driven ashore at Whitby, Yorkshire, United Kingdom. She was on a voyage from South Shields, County Durham to Rio de Janeiro, Brazil. She was refloated having lost her rudder. Her belligerent captain refused offers of help, but agreed to let the tug Emma (United Kingdom) take her in tow, but subsequently changed his mind, forcing her pilot off the ship at gunpoint. Sourabaya was subsequently taken in tow again the next day, but ran aground on the Black Middens, off the mouth of the River Tyne, and was wrecked.

== 23 January ==
List of shipwrecks: 23 January 1882
Ship	State	Description
Ste Marie	France	The brig was run down and sunk by the steamship Durley (United Kingdom). Her crew were rescued by Durley. Ste Marie was on a voyage from Lorient, Morbihan to Newport, Monmouthshire, United Kingdom.
Thomas Patrick	United Kingdom	The ship departed from Dublin for Wexford. No further trace, reported missing.
Valley City	United States	The schooner sprang a leak in a storm and sank 40 miles (64 km) east southeast of Pensacola, Florida, or off Cape San Blas, Florida.

== 24 January ==
List of shipwrecks: 24 January 1882
Ship	State	Description
John Banfield	United Kingdom	The barque struck the Carr Rock, Fife. She was taken in to Leith, Lothian the next day in a severely leaky condition.
Titania	United Kingdom	The steamship departed from New York, United States for the River Tyne and Dundee, Forfarshire. No further trace, reported missing.

== 25 January ==
List of shipwrecks: 25 January 1882
Ship	State	Description
Bird	United Kingdom	The shrimper was run down and sunk in Liverpool Bay by the steamship Marathon (United Kingdom) with the loss of a crew member.
Fe	Spain	The brigantine was driven ashore at Lydd, Kent, United Kingdom. She was on a voyage from Antwerp, Belgium to Havana, Cuba.
Jane Bacon, and Lara	United Kingdom	The steamships collided in the River Avon downstream of Pill, Somerset. Both vessels were severely damaged. Jane Bacon was on a voyage from Bristol, Gloucestershire to Liverpool, Lancashire. Lara was on a voyage from Waterford to Bristol. Both vessels were taken in to Bristol.
Memphis	Germany	The steamship ran aground oh the Spijkerplaat, in the North Sea off the Dutch coast. She was on a voyage from Hamburg to Antwerp.
Petunia	United Kingdom	The ship ran aground at IJmuiden, North Holland, Netherlands. She was on a voyage from Rangoon, Burma to Amsterdam, North Holland. She was refloated and found to be leaky.
Stanton	United Kingdom	The steamship was driven ashore at Sheringham, Norfolk. She was on a voyage from South Shields, County Durham to London. She was refloated and resumed her voyage.
Victoria	United States	The barque was wrecked on the Chinchorro Bank, off the coast of Mexico. Her crew were rescued.
Yorkshireman	United Kingdom	The steamship was driven ashore at Donna Nook, Lincolnshire. She was on a voyage from Bordeaux, Gironde, France to Hull, Yorkshire.
Unnamed	Flag unknown	The ship was run down and sunk at the Nore.

== 26 January ==
List of shipwrecks: 26 January 1882
Ship	State	Description
Anchoria	United Kingdom	The steamship ran aground in the Clyde near Bowling, Dunbartonshire. She was later refloated and taken in to Glasgow, Renfrewshire.
Asia	Sweden	The barque was abandoned in the Atlantic Ocean. Her crew were rescued by the steamship Azorian (United Kingdom).
European	United Kingdom	The steamship caught fire at Liverpool, Lancashire.
Evadne	United Kingdom	The steamship was driven ashore at Torekow, Sweden. She was on a voyage from Hull, Yorkshire to Reval, Russia.
Ivanhoe	United Kingdom	The steamship struck a sunken rock in Loch Hourn and was beached for temporary repairs.
Margaret	United Kingdom	The schooner was run down and sunk by the steamship G. W. Stephenson (United Kingdom). Her crew were rescued. Margaret was on a voyage from Arklow, County Wicklow to Bristol, Gloucestershire.
Spartan	United Kingdom	The brigantine was abandoned, after drifting in the Atlantic Ocean following the loss of her mainsail on 13 January. Her nine crew were rescued by Anglesea (United Kingdom) and were taken to Falmouth, Cornwall. Spartan was on a voyage from the Bull River, South Carolina, United States to Birkenhead, Cheshire.

== 27 January ==
List of shipwrecks: 27 January 1882
Ship	State	Description
Atmosphere	United Kingdom	The full-rigged ship collided with the clipper Thyatira (United Kingdom) and sank off Pernambuco, Brazil with the loss of one of her 21 crew. Atmosphere was on a voyage from Liverpool, Lancashire to Valparaíso, Chile.
Bruce	United Kingdom	The steamship foundered in Irvine Bay with the loss of four of her five crew. She was on a voyage from Irvine, Ayrshire to Port Dundas, Renfrewshire.
Lancashire Lass	United Kingdom	The ship was run into by the steamship Omniopolis (United Kingdom) and sank in the Belfast Lough.
Redesdale	United Kingdom	The steamship was driven ashore at Oude-Tonge, South Holland, Netherlands. She was on a voyage from Dedeagatch, Romania to Schiedam, South Holland.

== 30 January ==
List of shipwrecks: 30 January 1882
Ship	State	Description
America	Germany	The steamship departed from New York, United States for Hamburg. No further trace, reported missing.
Johannes Duyvensz	Norway	The ship was wrecked on the Kentish Knock. Her eight crew were rescued by the steamship Libau (France). Johannes Duyvensz was on a voyage from Grimsby, Lincolnshire, United Kingdom to Barcelona, Spain.
Richard Wardbreck	United Kingdom	The schooner was wrecked on the Seven Stones Reef, Cornwall. Her five crew took to a boat. Two survivors were rescued on 10 February by the barque Grad Karlovax (Austria-Hungary). Richard Wardbreck was on a voyage from Runcorn, Cheshire to Plymouth, Devon.

== 31 January ==
List of shipwrecks: 31 January 1882
Ship	State	Description
Water Spirit	United States	The schooner was wrecked on Pulpit Rock, near Rye Beach, New Hampshire. Her crew were rescued.

== Unknown date ==
List of shipwrecks: Unknown date in January 1882
Ship	State	Description
Alma	United Kingdom	The ship collided with Rambler (United Kingdom) and sank off Cloughy, County Down. Her crew were rescued by Rambler.
Amanda	Germany	The barque struck a rock at Puerto Rico and became leaky. She was on a voyage from Wilmington, Delaware, United States to Mayagüez, Puerto Rico. She was consequently condemned.
Anna	Germany	The schooner was driven ashore and wrecked at Cuxhaven. Her crew were rescued.
Balder	Sweden	The steamship was driven ashore at "Blackback". She was on a voyage from Libava, Courland Governorate to Stockholm.
Bloomer	Sweden	The barque was driven ashore on Skagen, Denmark. She was on a voyage from Cagliari, Sardinia, Italy to Gothenburg, Sweden. She was refloated.
Burgermeister Müller	Germany	The steamship sank in the Bristol Channel. Wreckage from the ship subsequently washed up on the coast of Glamorgan, United Kingdom.
Caprera	United Kingdom	The ship was abandoned at sea before 19 January. Her crew were rescued but her captain remained on board.
Carmelito	Portugal	The brigantine was driven ashore and wrecked at Casablanca, Morocco. She was on a voyage from Lisbon to Casablanca.
Catharina	Netherlands	The ship ran aground and was wrecked at Sandhammaren, Sweden. She was on a voyage from Riga, Russia to Delfzijl, Groningen.
Chesapeake	United Kingdom	The ship ran aground in the River Nene at Wisbech, Cambridgeshire. She was refloated on 9 January.
Cuba	(United Kingdom of Great Britain and Ireland) Guernsey	The barque was wrecked in the Keelung Islands.
Delia	Spain	The barque foundered before 23 January. Her crew were rescued. She was on a voyage from London, United Kingdom to Hong Kong.
Don Juan	United States	The ship ran aground in the Weser near Wremen, Germany. She was on a voyage from Philadelphia, Pennsylvania to Bremen, Germany.
Ebro	United Kingdom	The steamship ran aground in the Clyde downstream of Dumbarton.
Elba	Canada	The brigantine was abandoned in the Atlantic Ocean before 8 January. She subsequently came ashore on Islay, Inner Hebrides, United Kingdom. Elba was towed in to Greenock, Renfrewshire, United Kingdom in early April.
Elizabeth	United Kingdom	The schooner was wrecked with the loss of three of her crew.
Emmanuele Scicluna	Malta	The barque was destroyed by fire at Sfax, Algeria.
Enigma	United States	The ship was severely damaged by fire whilst on a voyage from Dunkerque, Nord, France to New York.
Erna	Norway	The barque was abandoned in the Atlantic Ocean.
Flower of the Fal	United Kingdom	The schooner was driven ashore at Berrow, Somerset. She was on a voyage from Belfast, County Antrim to Newport, Monmouthshire.
German Empire	United Kingdom	The steamship ran aground at Finkenwerder, Germany. She was refloated.
Germania	Germany	The steamship was driven ashore at Ahrenshöft. She was on a voyage from Lübeck to Libava.
Glenalvon	United Kingdom	The ship caught fire at Oran, Algeria and was scuttled.
Glenwry	United Kingdom	The schooner ran aground at Bangkok, Siam. She was on a voyage from Hong Kong to Bangkok. She was later refloated and taken in to Bangkok.
Hellas	Germany	The ship was driven from her moorings at Jarrow, Northumberland, United Kingdom and sank in the River Tyne.
Her Majestey	United Kingdom	The barque foundered between Saint Kitts and Tortola. Her crew survived. She was on a voyage from Trinidad to Dieppe, Seine-Inférieure, France.
Hestia	United Kingdom	The steamship was driven ashore at Newry, County Antrim. She was on a voyage from Cardiff, Glamorgan to Newry.
Highland Chief	United Kingdom	The ship was driven ashore and wrecked at Audreselles, Pas-de-Calais, France.
James McCarty	United States	The ship capsized and sank at Philadelphia.
J. H. M.	United States	The ship was driven ashore at Amityville, New York. She was on a voyage from New York to Viana do Castelo, Portugal.
Kezia	United Kingdom	The schooner was driven ashore in the Clyde opposite Greenock
Labora	Norway	The barque collided with the steamship Harald (Denmark) and was severely damaged.
Lamentin	France	The barque was driven ashore and wrecked at Santa Cruz. Her crew were rescued.
Lippe	Belgium	The steamship was wrecked at Bilbao, Spain. She was on a voyage from Bilbao to Antwerp.
Lodore	United Kingdom	The steamship was driven ashore at Ballyhalbert, County Down. She was on a voyage from Troon, Ayrshire to Bordeaux, Gironde, France. She was refloated, and taken in to Holyhead, Anglesey on 17 January.
Mary Jane	United Kingdom	The schooner sank in the River Welland 4 1/2 nautical miles (8.3 km) from Spalding, Lincolnshire.
Mary Rideout	United States	The ship was abandoned at sea. She was on a voyage from Pernambuco, Brazil to New York.
Melanope	United Kingdom	The ship was driven ashore in Port Philip Bay. She was on a voyage from Liverpool, Lancashire to Melbourne, Victoria.
Minerva	United Kingdom	The ship foundered in the Atlantic Ocean. Her crew took to a boat; they landed on Ascension Island. She was on a voyage from Chittagong, India to Guadeloupe.
Morton	United Kingdom	The barque was abandoned in the Atlantic Ocean. She was on a voyage from Dalhousie, New Brunswick, Canada to Whitehaven, Cumberland. She was subsequently discovered by the steamship Palmyra, which towed her in to Plymouth, Devon on 13 January.
Nederland	Netherlands	The steamship was driven ashore at Cape Henry, Virginia, United States. She was on a voyage from South Shields, County Durham, United Kingdom to Baltimore, Maryland, United States.
Nestorian	United Kingdom	The steamship ran aground in the Clyde downstream of Dumbarton. She was refloated.
Oscar	United Kingdom	The steamship was driven ashore on Terschelling, Friesland, Netherlands. She was on a voyage from Libava to Bruges, West Flanders, Belgium.
Ostsee	Germany	The ship was driven ashore at Kastrup, Denmark. She was on a voyage from Stettin to Copenhagen, Denmark.
Oxenholme	United Kingdom	The steamship arrived at New Orleans, Louisiana from Liverpool on fire. The fire was extinguished.
Pallas	Denmark	The barque was driven ashore. She was on a voyage from Örnskjöldsvik, Sweden to Dieppe. She was refloated and taken in to Kristiansand, Norway in a severely leaky condition.
P. A. Munch	Norway	The barque ran aground on the Longsand, in the North Sea off the coast of Essex, United Kingdom. She was refloated on 1 February and towed in to London.
Philemon	France	The ship was driven ashore on Inagua, Bahamas. She was on a voyage from Haiti to Havre de Grâce, Seine-Inférieure. She was refloated and taken in to Matthew Town, Great Inagua, Bahamas in a leaky condition.
Rallus	United Kingdom	The steamship was driven ashore in Bootle Bay. She was on a voyage from Liverpool to Antwerp.
Reisclid	(France) Tunisia	The brigantine was wrecked at "Hammelif" with the loss of four of her crew. She was on a voyage from "Motka" to Tunis.
Robert L. Lane	United Kingdom	The ship was driven ashore at the mouth of the River Avon. She was refloated and taken in to the Kingroad.
Sarepta	United Kingdom	The ship was driven ashore on Saltholm, Denmark. She was on a voyage from Riga to London.
Scotia	United Kingdom	The schooner was driven ashore at Port Erin, Isle of Man. Both crew were rescued.
Sedulous	United Kingdom	The schooner was driven ashore and wrecked at Nefyn, Caernarfonshire.
Solide	Sweden	The barque was wrecked on the Hinder Bank, in the North Sea off the coast of Zeeland. Her crew were rescued. She was on a voyage from Riga, Russia to Honfleur, Manche.
Soren Berner	Flag unknown	The ship was driven ashore at Imbituba, Brazil.
Suppicich	Germany	The brig was driven ashore at Ljugarn, Gotland, Sweden. She was on a voyage from Newport, Monmouthshire, to Memel. She was refloated and taken in to Slite, Sweden in a leaky condition. She was placed under repair.
Talisman	United Kingdom	The full-rigged ship ran aground on the Dolphin Shoal, off the coast of India. She was on a voyage from Chittagong to Dundee, Forfarshire.
Terranova	United Kingdom	The ship was wrecked at Cape St. Francis, Newfoundland Colony. She was on a voyage from Harbour Grace, Newfoundland Colony to Valentia Island, County Kerry.
Theodore	Denmark	The ship was driven ashore at Dymchurch, Kent, United Kingdom. She was on a voyage from Stockholm, Sweden to Figueira da Foz, Portugal.
Thetis	United Kingdom	The steamship was wrecked on the Black Rock, off the coast of County Galway. She was on a voyage from Liverpool to Galway.
Wendelina Jacoba	Netherlands	The schooner struck a submerged wreck in the Chausée de Sein. She was on a voyage from Bayonne, Loire-Inférieure, France to Greenock. She put in to Brest, Finistère, France in a severely leaky condition.
Wikingen	Norway	The schooner was driven ashore at Kuressaare, Russia. She was on a voyage from Sundsvall, Sweden to a Belgian port.
