= Mister Grand International =

International male beauty pageant

- Type: International male beauty pageant
- Parent organization: Mister Grand International Organization, Ltd.; Mastermind Universe Entertainment
- Headquarters: Quezon City, Philippines
- First edition: 2017
- Most recent edition: 2023
- Current titleholder: Seif Al-Walid Harb; Lebanon
- Founder: Mark Gil Balisacan
- President: Jeffrey Soliman
- Chairman: Bryan Franco
- Website: mistergrandinternational.org

Mister Grand International, or simply Mister Grand, is an international male beauty pageant established in 2017 by Filipino creative and producer Mark Gil Balisacan. The organization's inaugural edition was held at Crossroad Center in Quezon City, Philippines on 7 October 2017. It is the counterpart to the unaffiliated female beauty pageant, Miss Grand International.

The inaugural competition, which has attracted over 30 participating countries and territories since its inception in 2017, aims to develop young men into exemplary leaders through empowerment. The MGI Organization celebrates the positive qualities of men through: "Enhancing Sensible Masculinity, Outstanding Sportsmanship and Limitless Potential".

The current titleholder of Mister Grand International 2023 is Seif Al Walid Harb from Lebanon. He was crowned by the former titleholder, Mister Grand International 2022 Michael Pelletier of Switzerland, on 14 January 2024, at Casa De La Cultura Hinojos in Huelva & Seville, Spain.

== History ==
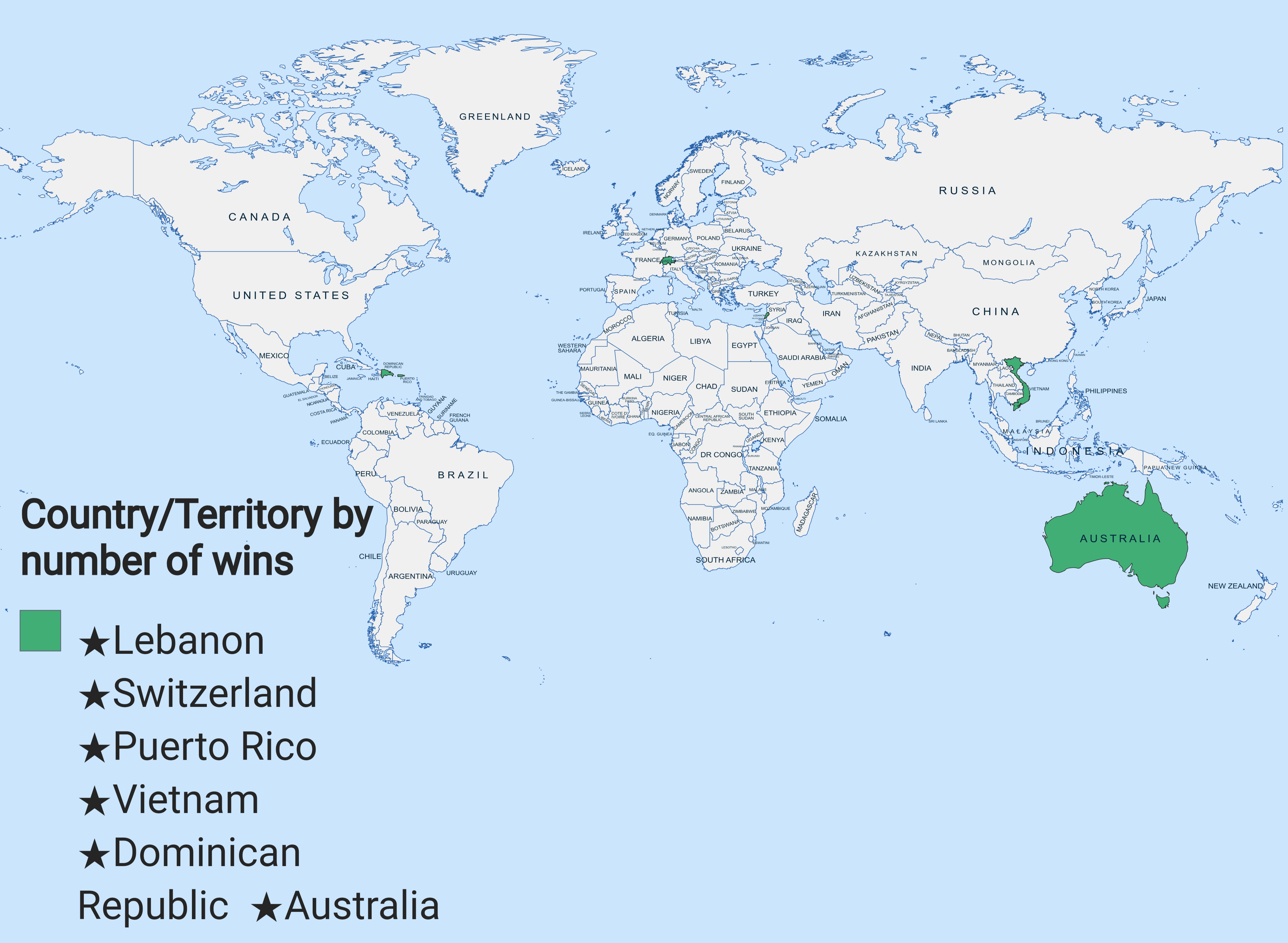
Countries and territories that have won at Mister Grand International (at least once), as of 2024.

The male beauty pageant was founded in 2017 by Mark Gil Balisacan. The organization's first edition was held at Crossroad Center in Quezon City, Philippines, on October 7, 2017.

Mister Grand International Organization seeks to promote friendship, goodwill, and cultural exchange among young men from around the world. Contestants participate in various activities and events, showcasing their talents, intelligence, and physical fitness. The competition aims to provide a platform for contestants to demonstrate their leadership skills and advocate for important social causes. The pageant includes traditional segments such as national costume, swimwear, and formal wear, as well as opportunities for the contestants to engage in community service and charitable endeavors. Winners of Mister Grand International often serve as ambassadors for their respective countries and are expected to champion humanitarian efforts and global awareness.

The organization is not affiliated to Miss Grand International, which is based in Thailand. The organizers of the competition in 2018 and 2019 had their pageant staged back to back in Myanmar. Due to the pandemic, just like all international competitions, Mister Grand International skipped the year 2020. A year after, in 2021, the organization announced their decision to bring the pageant organization to Panama. While in 2022, the host country is the Caribbean nation of Trinidad and Tobago.

In November 2024, Mary Jean Lastimosa was appointed as the organization's international director.

== Titleholders ==
Here is a full list of all Mister Grand International titleholders:

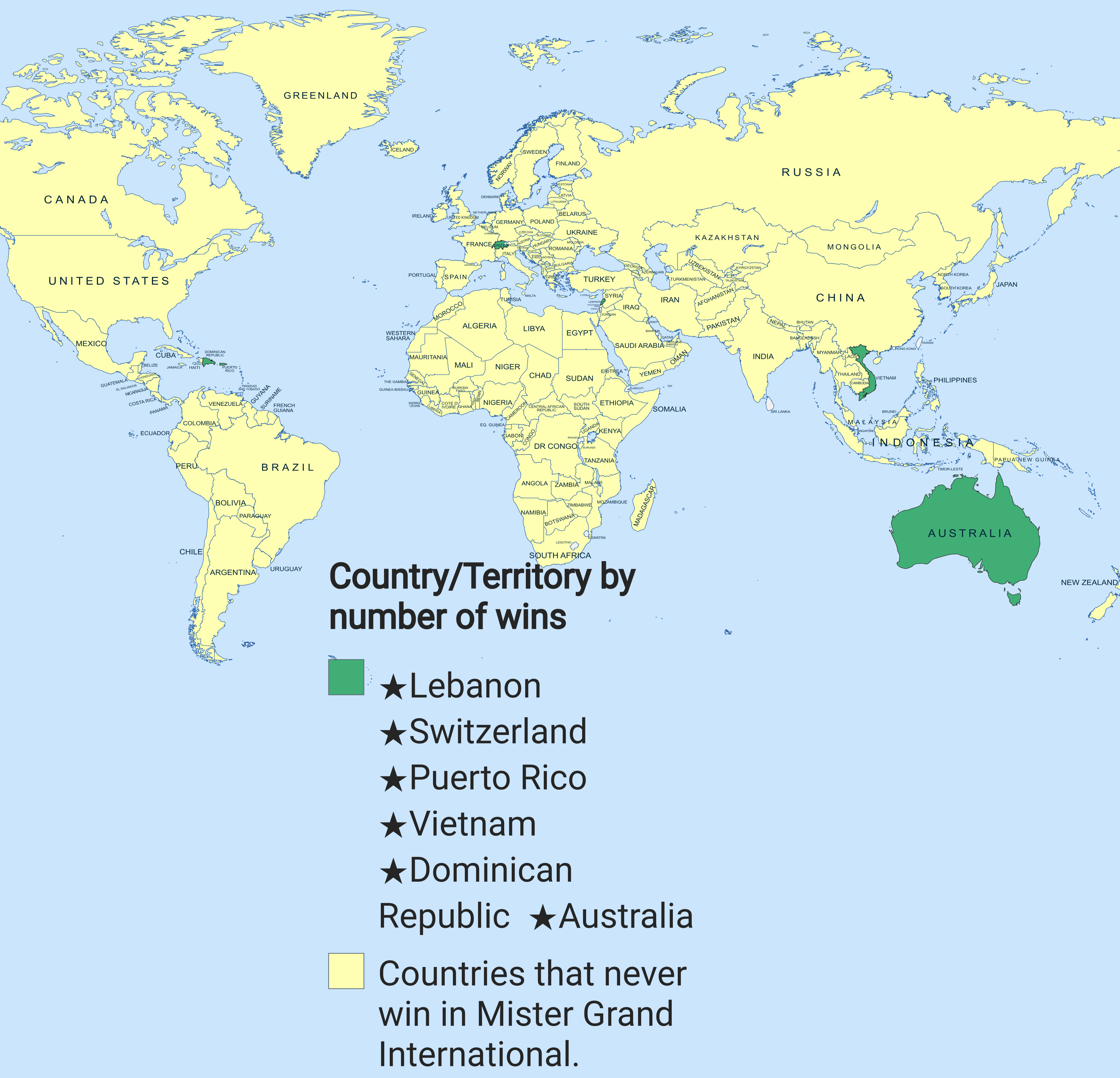
Countries and territories who never won at Mister Grand International as of 2023.

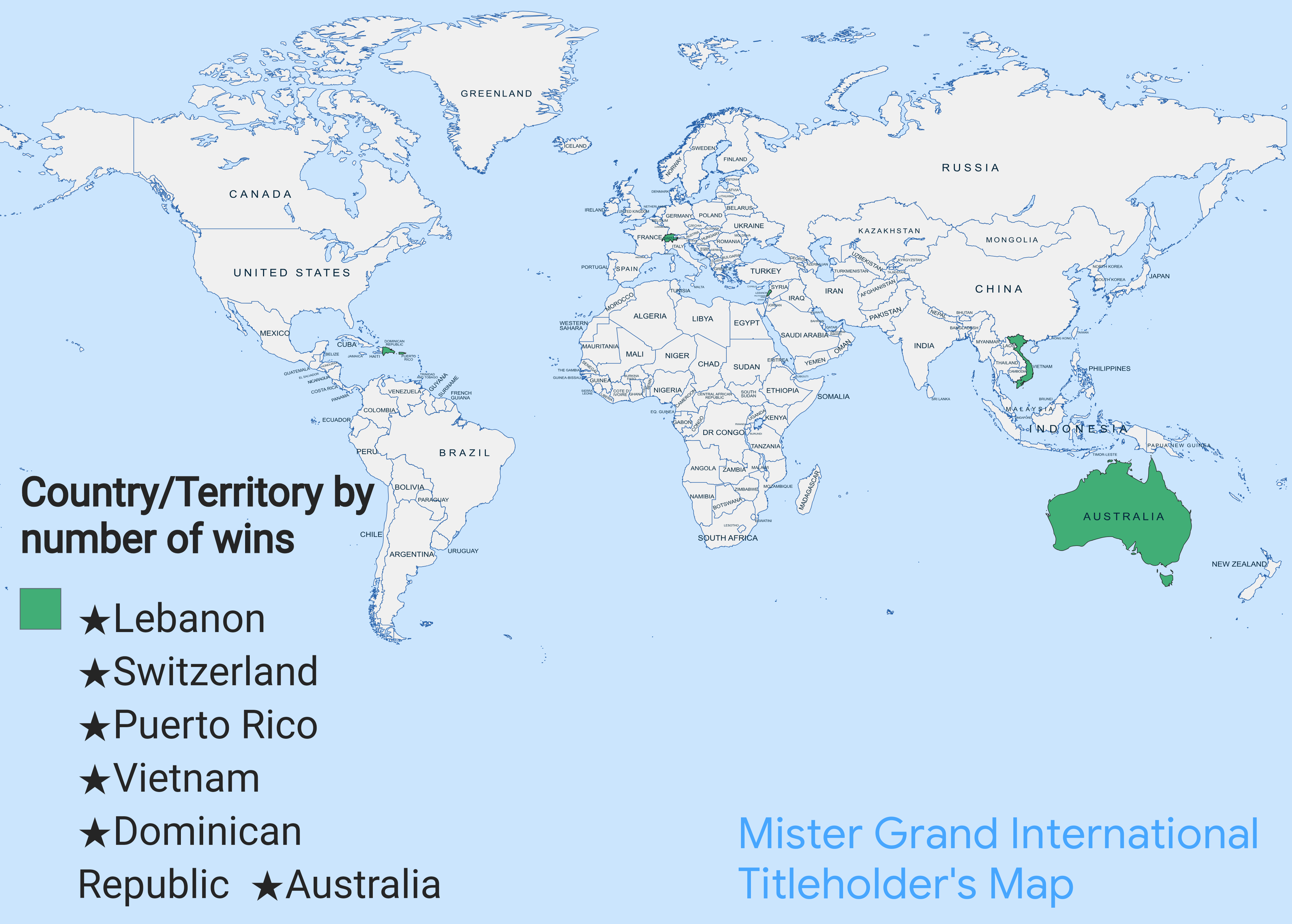
Countries and territories won at Mister Grand International as of 2023.

Edition	Year	Mister Grand International	Runner-Ups					Ref.
Edition	Year	Mister Grand International	First	Second	Third	Fourth	Fifth	Ref.
7th — 8th	2024–2025	No pageant held.						
6th	2023	Lebanon; Seif Al Walid Harb	Singapore; Igor Cheban	Thailand; Sirinutt Sean Cholvibool	Poland; Michal Kalcowski	Korea; Hwang Jung Sung	Philippines; Jesus Guinto	
5th	2022	Switzerland; Michael Pelletier	Philippines; Kristzan Delos Santos	Singapore; Aaron Tan	Trinidad and Tobago; Aquil Ramsahai	Vietnam; Nguyễn Vũ Linh	Tahiti; Teaniva Dinard	
4th	2021	Puerto Rico; Fernando Ezequiel Padin	Trinidad and Tobago; Suveer Ramsook	USA; Cayman Cardiff	France; Cedric Cabane	Canada; Jacob Ondrus	Not awarded	
2020		Cancelled due to the COVID-19 pandemic.						
3rd	2019	Vietnam; Nguyễn Văn Tuân	Brazil; Jairo Sanchez	Philippines; Paulo Gallardo	Thailand; Kitsada Nimala	Puerto Rico; Gregory Nuñez	Not awarded	
2nd	2018	Dominican Republic; Rodney Tapia	Vietnam; Lý Cao Tiến Sơn	France; Steven Le Coquet	Venezuela; Jesus Alvarado	Japan; Riku Yuasa	Not awarded	
1st	2017	Australia; Michael Angelo Skyllas	Thailand; Rachata Hampanont	Vietnam; Nguyễn Tiến Đạt	Germany; Hamid Noor	Philippines; Joshua Reginald Banatin	Not awarded	

Titleholders Countries/Territories From Myanmar, Brazil & The Acknowledged MGI Combined

Year	Titleholder	Runner-Ups					
Year	Titleholder	First	Second	Third	Fourth	Fifth	Sixth
2023 Acknowledged MGI	Lebanon; Seif Al Walid Harb	Singapore; Igor Cheban	Thailand; Sirinutt Sean Cholvibool	Poland; Michal Kalcowski	Korea; Hwang Jung Sung	Philippines; Jesus Guinto	Not awarded
2023 Brazil based	Mexico Damian Buenrostro	No Data	No Data	No Data	No Data	Not awarded	Not awarded
2022 Acknowledged MGI	Switzerland; Michael Pelletier	Philippines; Kristzan Delos Santos	Singapore; Aaron Tan	Trinidad and Tobago; Aquil Ramsahai	Vietnam; Nguyễn Vũ Linh	Tahiti; Teaniva Dinard	Not awarded
2022 Brazil based	Brazil Gill Haupp	No Data	Paraguay Felix Gamarra	No Data	No Data	Not awarded	Not awarded
2021 Acknowledged MGI	Puerto Rico; Fernando Ezequiel Padin	Trinidad and Tobago; Suveer Ramsook	USA; Cayman Cardiff	France; Cedric Cabane	Canada; Jacob Ondrus	Not awarded	Not awarded
2020	Cancelled due to the COVID-19 pandemic.						
2019 Acknowledged MGI	Vietnam; Nguyễn Văn Tuân	Brazil; Jairo Sanchez	Philippines; Paulo Gallardo	Thailand; Kitsada Nimala	Puerto Rico; Gregory Nuñez	Not awarded	Not awarded
2019 Brazil based	India; Ashwani Neeraj	Brazil	Brazil (Island)	Suriname; Joey Lansdorf Young	United States	Chile	Not awarded
2018 Acknowledged MGI	Dominican Republic; Rodney Tapia	Vietnam; Lý Cao Tiến Sơn	France; Steven Le Coquet	Venezuela; Jesus Alvarado	Japan; Riku Yuasa	Not awarded	Not awarded
2018 Philippines based	Tahiti; Kevin Richmond	Netherlands; Mike Piek	Philippines; David Simon Reyes	Sierra Leone; Flascious Mansaray	Thailand; ChsBas Chatshol Ponpiboon	Not awarded	Not awarded
2018 Brazil based	Brazil; Bruno Poczinek	No Data	No Data	No Data	Not awarded	Not awarded	Not awarded
2017 Acknowledged MGI	Australia; Michael Angelo Skyllas	Thailand; Rachata Hampanont	Vietnam; Nguyễn Tiến Đạt	Germany; Hamid Noor	Philippines; Joshua Reginald Banatin	Not awarded	Not awarded
2017 Brazil based	Brazil (Brazil Island); Wesley Herculano	Chile	Venezuela	Sri Lanka	Spain	Cameroon	Puerto Rico
2016 Brazil based	Argentina; Federico Guasch	No Data	No Data	No Data	Not awarded	Not awarded	Not awarded

Mister Teen Grand International (Brazil-based pageant)

Year	Titleholder	Location	Contestant
2023	Vinicius Arruda; Brazil	Porto Alegre, Brazil	12
2022	Gustavo Agustín Leguizamón; Paraguay	Porto Alegre, Brazil	20
2019	Marcos Da Veiga; Paraguay	Porto Alegre, Brazil	13
2018	Juan Feliciano; Venezuela	Porto Alegre, Brazil	22
2017	Guilherme Oldra; Brazil	Porto Alegre, Brazil	15
2016	Tiago Muniz; Brazil	Porto Alegre, Brazil	20

== MGI's Editions ==
=== MGI 2024 results ===
Placements

Seventh Edition
Placement	Contestant
Mister Grand International 2024	

=== MGI 2023 results ===
Placements

Sixth Edition		Ref.
Placement	Contestant	Ref.
Mister Grand International 2023	Lebanon – Seif Al Walid Harb	
1st Runner-up	Singapore – Igor Cheban	
2nd Runner-up	Thailand – Sirinutt Sean Cholvibool	
3rd Runner-up	Poland – Michael Kalcowski	
4th Runner-up	Korea – Hwang Jung Sung	
5th Runner-up	Philippines – Jesus Guinto	

=== MGI 2022 results ===
Placements

Fifth Edition
Placement	Contestant
Mister Grand International 2022	Switzerland – Michael Pelletier
1st Runner-up	Philippines – Kristzan Delos Santos
2nd Runner-up	Singapore – Aaron Tan
3rd Runner-up	Trinidad and Tobago – Aquil Ramsahai
4th Runner-up	Vietnam – Nguyễn Vũ Linh
5th Runner-up	Tahiti – Teaniva Dinard

=== MGI 2021 results ===
Placements

Fourth Edition
Placement	Contestant
Mister Grand International 2021	Puerto Rico – Fernando Ezequiel Padin
1st Runner-up	Trinidad and Tobago – Suveer Ramsook
2nd Runner-up	United States – Cayman Cardiff
3rd Runner-up	France – Cedric Cabane
4th Runner-up	Canada – Jacob Ondrus

=== MGI 2019 results ===
Placements

Third Edition
Placement	Contestant
Mister Grand International 2019	Vietnam – Nguyễn Văn Tuân
1st Runner-up	Brazil – Jairo Sanchez
2nd Runner-up	Philippines – Paulo Gallardo
3rd Runner-up	Thailand – Kitsada Nimala
4th Runner-up	Puerto Rico – Gregory Nuñez
Top 8	India – Vatsal Capadia; Myanmar – United States – Jun Wu

Special Awards

Award	Contestant
Mister Grand Photogenic	Thailand – Kitsada Nimala
Mister Grand Sports Ambassador	Myanmar –
Best in National Costume	Philippines – Paolo Gallardo
Best in Swimwear	Brazil – Jairo Sanchez
Best in Formal Wear	Vietnam – Nguyễn Văn Tuân
Missosology's Choice	Vietnam – Nguyễn Văn Tuân

Mister Grand International 2019 (Brazil-based) Results Placements

Fourth Edition
Placement	Contestant
Mister Grand International 2019	India – Ashwani Neeraj
1st Runner-up	Brazil –
2nd Runner-up	Brazil Island –
3rd Runner-up	Suriname – Joey Lansdorf Young
4th Runner-up	United States –
5th Runner-up	Chile –

Fourth Edition
Placement	Contestant
Mister Teen Grand International 2019	Paraguay – Marcos Da Veiga

Special Awards

Award	Contestant
Best in National Costume	India – Ashwani Neeraj
Best Model	Suriname – Joey Lansdorf Young

=== MGI 2018 results ===
Placements

Second Edition
Placement	Contestant
Mister Grand International 2018	Dominican Republic – Rodney Tapia
1st Runner-up	Vietnam – Lý Cao Tiến Sơn
2nd Runner-up	France – Steven Le Coquet
3rd Runner-up	Venezuela – Jesus Alvarado
4th Runner-up	Japan – Riku Yuasa
Top 9	India – Lakshay Chaudhary; Indonesia – Daniel Widodo; Sri Lanka – Viraj Kodithuwaku

Special Awards

Award	Contestant
Sports Ambassador	Myanmar – Khun Set Ham

Mister Grand International 2018 (Philippines-based) Results Placements

First Edition
Placement	Contestant
Mister Grand International 2018 (The title was later changed to Mister Tourism Globe 2018)	Tahiti – Kevin Richmond
1st Runner-up	Netherlands – Mike Piek
2nd Runner-up	Philippines – David Simon Reyes
3rd Runner-up	Sierra Leone – Flascious Mansaray
4th Runner-up	Thailand – ChsBas Chatshol Ponpiboon
Continentals (Africa)	Morocco – Haroune Marroua
Continentals (America)	Venezuela – Orlando Ruiz
Continentals (Asia)	Vietnam – Luận Vũ

Special Awards

Award	Contestant
Tourism Ambassador	Canada – Kim Javier
Sports Ambassador	Turkey – Furkan Ozturk
Best in National Costume	Winner Philippines – David Simon Reyes
Runners-up	(gold) Thailand – ChsBas Chatshol Ponpiboon
Runners-up	(silver) Netherlands – Mike Piek
Mister Photogenic	Netherlands – Mike Piek
Mister Congeniality	Cambodia – Gregg Dalde
Mister Personality	Thailand – ChsBas Chatshol Ponpiboon
Best Formal Wear	Thailand – ChsBas Chatshol Ponpiboon
Best in Swimwear	Tahiti – Kevin Richmond
Media's Choice Award	Vietnam – Luận Vũ
People's Choice Award	Vietnam – Luận Vũ
Mister Xentro Mall	Philippines – David Simon Reyes
Mister Psalmstre	Vietnam – Luận Vũ
Mister Zarapath Construction	Netherlands – Mike Piek
Mister Solong Eco Park and Tours	Philippines – David Simon Reyes
Mister Dreamwave	Tahiti – Kevin Richmond
Mister Balai Inn	Turkey – Furkan Ozturk
Mister Nails Glow	Thailand – ChsBas Chatshol Ponpiboon
Mister LCC	Tahiti – Kevin Richmond
Best in Barong Tagalog	Thailand – ChsBas Chatshol Ponpiboon
Runners-up	(gold) Vietnam – Luận Vũ
Runners-up	(silver) Tahiti – Kevin Richmond
Best Sports Wear	Philippines – David Simon Reyes
Runners-up	(gold) Tahiti – Kevin Richmond
Runners-up	(silver) Thailand – ChsBas Chatshol Ponpiboon

=== MGI 2017 results ===
Placements

First Edition
Placement	Contestant
Mister Grand International 2017	Australia – Michael Angelo Skyllas
1st Runner-up	Thailand – Rachata Hampanont
2nd Runner-up	Vietnam – Nguyễn Tiến Đạt
3rd Runner-up	Germany – Hamid Noor
4th Runner-up	Philippines – Joshua Reginald Banatin
Mister Grand Tourism Ambassador	Spain – Victor Haro
Mister Grand Sports Ambassador	Dominican Republic – Blachy Abreu
Top 15	Ecuador – Abel Adrian Diaz; France – Michael Aghadjanian; Japan – Riku Yuasa; Malaysia – Kian Ching; Nepal – Dikpal Karki; Peru – Renzo Verteri; Sri Lanka – United States – Aaron Day

Special Awards

Award	Contestant
Mister Grand Talent	Ecuador – Abel Adrian Diaz
Mister Formal Wear	United States – Aaron Day
Mister Grand Online	Nepal – Dikpal Karki
Mister Anytime Fitness	Canada – Mohammad Rahmanian
Mister Dermaworld	Philippines – Joshua Reginald Banatin
Mister Seen Ambassador	Philippines – Joshua Reginald Banatin
Media's Choice	Philippines – Joshua Reginald Banatin
Best in Swimwear	Vietnam – Nguyễn Tiến Đạt
Mister Friendship	Germany – Hamid Noor
Mister Belmere	Thailand – Rachata Hampanont
Mister Grand Fashion Style	Thailand – Rachata Hampanont
Mister Psalmstre	Australia – Michael Angelo Skyllas
Mister Cocoline	Australia – Michael Angelo Skyllas

== Country/Territory by number of wins ==
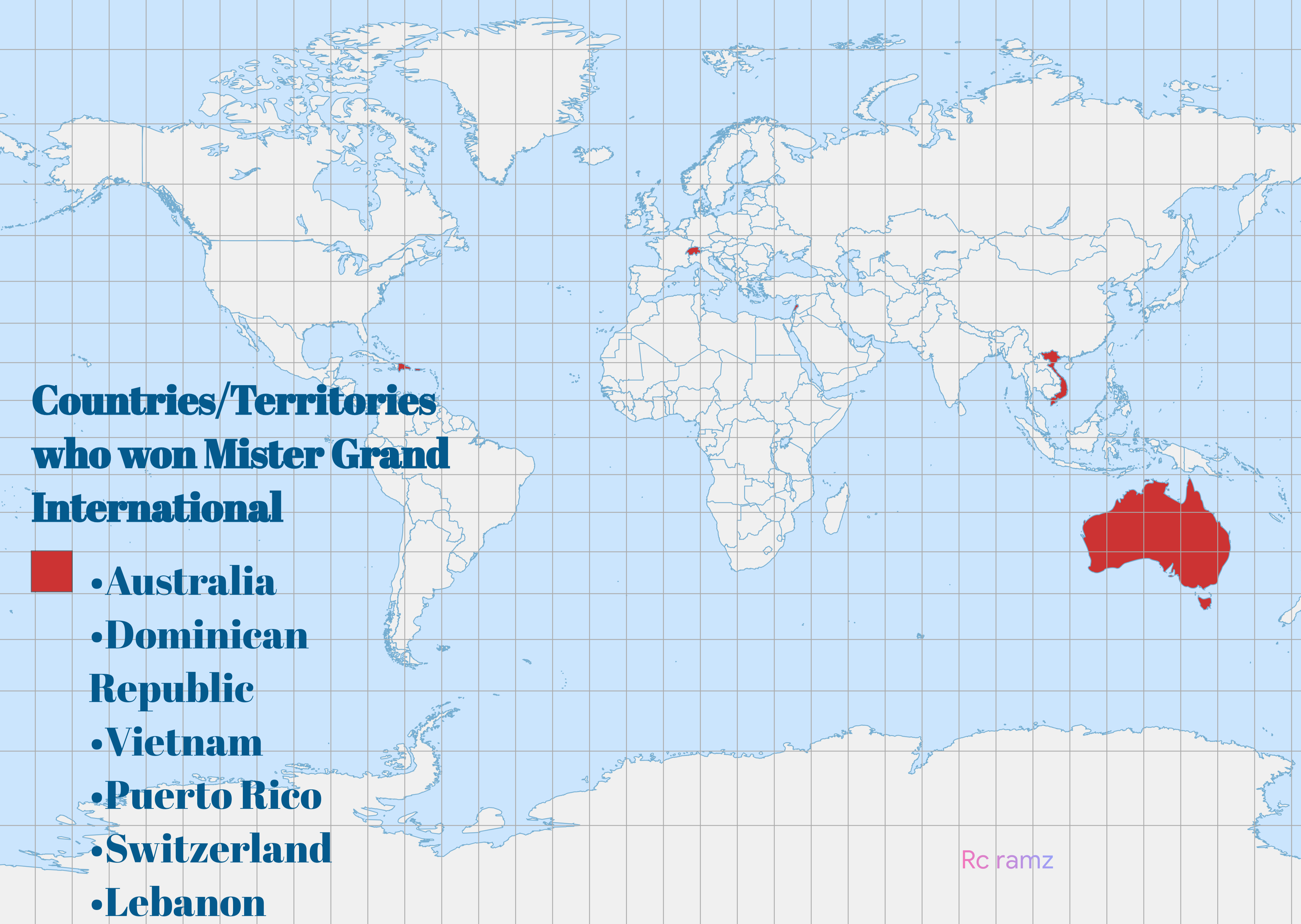
RED indicators of countries/territories won at MGI pageant as of January 2024.

Country	Titles	Year
Lebanon	1	2023
Switzerland	1	2022
Puerto Rico	1	2021
Vietnam	1	2019
Dominican Republic	1	2018
Australia	1	2017

Continents by number of wins

Continents	Titles	Country (Number)
Americas	2	Dominican Republic, Puerto Rico
Europe	1	Switzerland
Asia	2	Vietnam, Lebanon
Africa	0	
Oceania	1	Australia

Mister Grand International (Brazil-based pageant)

Country	Titles	Year
Brazil	3	2017, 2018, 2022
Mexico	1	2023
India	1	2019
Argentina	1	2016

Mister Teen Grand International (Brazil-based pageant)

Country	Titles	Year
Brazil	3	2016, 2017, 2023
Paraguay	2	2019, 2022
Venezuela	1	2018

Mister Grand International (Philippine-based pageant)

Country	Titles	Year
Tahiti	1	2018
Australia	1	2017

Note: The title was later changed to Mister Tourism Globe 2018.

== Controversy ==
Mister Grand International 2023 Event Issue

On 15 January 2024, during the grand final event that took place in Spain, an awkward situation unfolded. The host country's representative's family members rushed onto the stage, creating a scandalous scene and causing chaos in the final night of the competition. They were not pleased by the result, as their friend, the contestant, was not included in the top positions.

== See also ==
- List of beauty pageants
