= List of islands of Brazil =

List of Brazilian islands

The following is a list of the islands of Brazil.

== Atlantic Ocean islands ==
- Arquipélago de Fernando de Noronha (Fernando de Noronha Archipelago)
- Arquipélago de São Pedro e São Paulo (Saint Peter and Saint Paul Archipelago)
- Atol das Rocas (Rocas Atoll)
- Alcatrazes Archipelago
- Ilha das Couves São Sebastião
- Cagarras Archipelago
- Ilha do Algodão
- Ilha de Boipeba
- Ilha de Maraca
- Ilha Montão de Trigo
- Ilha da Queimada Grande
- Ilha Rasa
- Ilha de Santa Bárbara
- Ilha de Santa Catarina
- Ilha de Santo Amaro
- Ilha de Santo Aleixo
- Ilha de São Luís
- Ilha Grande
- Ilha de Itaparica
- Ilha de Tinharé
- Ilha Trindade
- Ilhabela Archipelago
  - Ilha de São Sebastião
- Ilha de Itamaracá
- Ilha Comprida
- Martim Vaz Archipelago
- Vitória Archipelago
  - Ilha de Vitória

== Amazon delta islands ==
- Grande de Gurupá Island
- Marajó
- Serraria Island
- Cotijuba
- Caviana
- Mexiana

== Amazon River islands ==
- Bananal Island
- Tupinambarana

== City islands ==
- Couves Island
- Ilha Fiscal (Fiscal Island)

== Other islands ==
- Brazilian Island

== See also ==
- Coastline of Brazil
- Geography of Brazil
- Lake island
- List of islands by area
- List of islands by highest point
- List of islands by population
- List of islands in the Atlantic Ocean
- List of islands of South America
- Outline of Brazil
