= Ilha do Algodão =

Island in Brazil

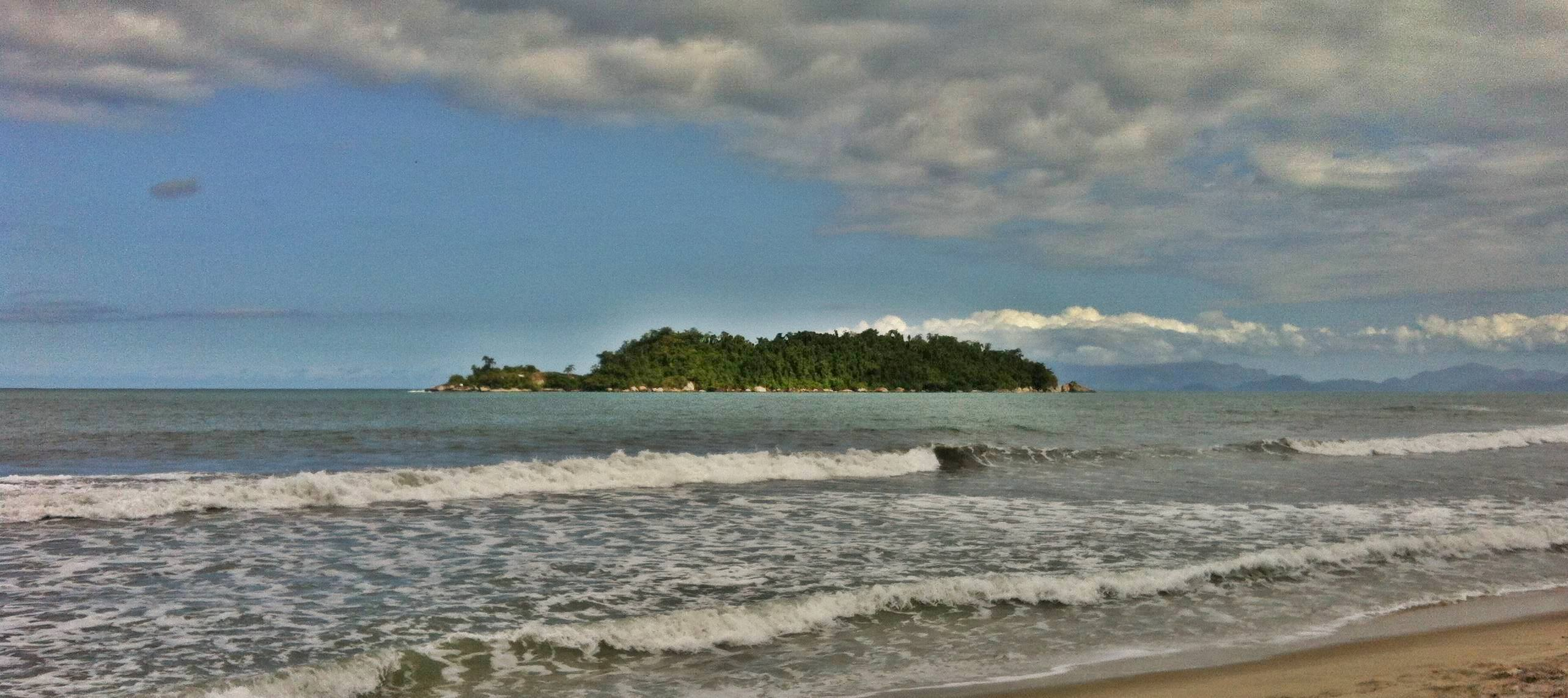
- View of the island in the background
- Interactive map of Ilha do Algodão

Geography
- Coordinates: 23°12′S 44°5′W
- Highest elevation: 34 m (112 ft)

Administration
- Brazil
- Southeast Region
- State of Rio de Janeiro

Ilha do Algodão (Portuguese: [ˈiʎɐ dwawɡuˈdɐ̃w]) (transl. Cotton island) is an island 400 meters away from the historic village of Mambucaba, 6 km northeast of Angra Nuclear Power Plant, in the municipality of Angra dos Reis, southeast of the state of Rio de Janeiro.

== History ==
Records of the time indicate that in 1611, a Baiano (a man from the state of Bahia) would have been granted the island, at the tip of Iperuquara (possibly the one that separates Mambucaba from Praia Vermelha). Also recorded is an island of 200 fathoms in the same locality, granted to Estácio Ferreira in 1619 (possibly Ilha do Algodão).

== See also ==
- List of islands of Brazil
