= Mister Grand International 2021 =

4th pageant of Mister Grand International

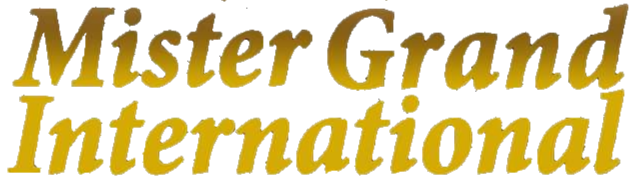
- Date: December 4, 2021
- Venue: Panama City, Panama
- Broadcaster: YouTube / Facebook
- Entrants: 27
- Placements: 18
- Debuts: Argentina, Armenia, Belgium, Bolivia, Canada, Colombia, Costa Rica, Cuba, Czech Republic, Dominican Republic, Easter Island, Ecuador, Finland, France, Guyana, Haiti, Japan, South Korea, Martinique, Mexico, Netherlands, Panama, Paraguay, Peru, Philippines, Puerto Rico, South Africa, Thailand, Trinidad and Tobago, Ukraine, US, Venezuela
- Winner: Fernando Ezequiel Padin; Puerto Rico
- Personality: Gustavo Olmos, Mexico
- Best National Costume: Abdiel Diaz, Panama
- Photogenic: Jose Gabriel Moreno, Ecuador
- Mister Popularity Award: Michael Ver Comaling, Philippines

Mister Grand International 2021 was the fourth edition of the Mister Grand International competition, that took place on Dec 4, 2021 at Panama City, Panama. Contestants from thirty-two countries and territories competed in this pageant. It was broadcast live on Mister Grand International's official YouTube and Facebook page.

At the end of the event, Tuan Lucas of Vietnam Mister Grand International 2019 crowned Fernando Ezequiel Padin of Puerto Rico as Mister Grand International 2021, marking its first win of Puerto Rico in this pageant.

== Results ==
=== Placements ===
The Mister Grand International 2021 Final Competition was broadcast LIVE on the official YouTube and Facebook pages of Mister Grand International from the host country, Panama, on December 4, 2021.

Fourth Edition
Placement	Contestant
Winner	Puerto Rico – Fernando Ezequiel Padin
1st Runner-up	Trinidad and Tobago – Suveer Ramsook
2nd Runner-up	United States – Cayman Cardiff
3rd Runner-up	France – Cedric Cabane
4th Runner-up	Canada – Jacob Ondrus
Top 10	Ecuador – Jose Gabriel Moreno; Mexico – Gustavo Olmos; Panama – Abdiel Diaz; Philippines – Michael Ver Anton Comaling; Venezuela – Steven Aponte
Top 18	Bolivia – Cristhian Cochamanidis; Colombia – Andres Arengas; Costa Rica – Esteban Sanarrucia; Czech Republic – Lukas Vysehrad; Japan – Kenta Nagai; South Korea – Seo Jun Choi; Paraguay – Axel Portillo; Thailand – Gioele Arunthep; Ukraine – Alex Demianenko

=== Special awards ===
Ref:

Award	Contestant
Best in Traditional Wear	Panama – Abdiel Diaz
Mister Photogenic	Ecuador – Jose Gabriel Moreno
Mister Personality	Mexico – Gustavo Olmos
Mister Pau Sports	Philippines – Michael Ver Comaling
Mister Real Man	Trinidad and Tobago – Suveer Ramsook
Youlink Community Channel	Philippines – Michael Ver Comaling
Best in Swimwear	Canada – Jacob Ondrus
MG Sports Ambassador	Philippines – Michael Ver Comaling
Best in Formal Wear	Ukraine – Alex Demianenko
Mister Popularity Award	Philippines – Michael Ver Comaling §

Note

§ – Automatic in Top 10

== Contestants ==
27 candidates have been confirmed to compete for the title of Mister Grand International 2021.

Country/Territory	Candidates	Continent
Argentina	Jorge Barrera	South America
Armenia	Edgar Karapetyan	Asia
Belgium	Liam Vlassenbroeck	Europe
Bolivia	Cristhian Cochamanidis	South America
Canada	Jacob Ondrus	North America
Colombia	Yerson Andres Aragones	South America
Costa Rica	Esteban Sunarricia	North America
Cuba	Yunior Mora	North America
Czech Republic	Lukas Vysehrad	Europe
Dominican Republic	Dean Mendoza	North America
Easter Island	Jaime Eliab Salas	Oceania
Ecuador	Gabriel Moreno	South America
France	Cedric Cabane	Europe
Guyana	Dexter Gardener	South America
Japan	Kento Nagai	Asia
South Korea	Seo Jun Choi	Asia
Mexico	Choyero Gustavo Olmos	North America
Netherlands	Mitchell Schmidt	Europe
Panama	Abdiel Diaz	North America
Paraguay	Alex Portillo	South America
Peru	Renzo Durand	South America
Philippines	Michael Ver Comaling	Asia
Puerto Rico	Fernando Ezequiel Padin	North America
Trinidad and Tobago	Suveer Ramsook	South America
Ukraine	Alex Demianento	Europe
United States	Cayman Cardiff	North America
Venezuela	Steven Aponte	South America

== See also ==
- List of beauty pageants
