= List of shipwrecks in November 1881 =

The list of shipwrecks in November 1881 includes ships sunk, foundered, grounded, or otherwise lost during November 1881.

== 1 November ==
List of shipwrecks: 1 November 1881
Ship	State	Description
Christian Loven	Sweden	The ship ran aground at Understen and was wrecked. She was on a voyage from Bordeaux, Gironde, France to a port in the Norrland.
Johnnie Boy	United Kingdom	The ketch was wrecked near Eastbourne, Sussex. She was on a voyage from Swanage, Dorset to Eastbourne.
Lady Stuart	United Kingdom	The ship was run into by the schooner William Stonart (United Kingdom) and sank. Lady Stuart was on a voyage from Charlestown, Cornwall to Runcorn, Cheshire.
Neautan	United Kingdom	The ship was sighted off Amherst, Burma whilst on a voyage from Moulmein, Burma to Bombay, India. No further trace, reported missing.
Prairie Flower	(United Kingdom of Great Britain and Ireland) Jersey	The ketch struck rocks off Noirmont Point and foundered. Her crew were rescued. She was on a voyage from Newport, Monmouthshire to Saint Helier, Jersey.

== 2 November ==
List of shipwrecks: 2 November 1881
Ship	State	Description
Cadogal	France	The steamship was driven ashore and wrecked near Audierne, Finistère. She was on a voyage from Dunkirk, Nord to Bordeaux, Gironde.
Dolphin	United Kingdom	The smack ran aground at Great Yarmouth, Norfolk and was wrecked. Her crew were rescued.
Hedwig, and Oscar	United Kingdom	The ships collided off Great Orme Head, Caernarfonshire and were both severely damaged. Hedwig was on a voyage from New York, United States to Liverpool, Lancashire. Oscar was on a voyage from the Bull River to Liverpool. They were towed into the River Mersey by the tugs Fire Queen and Rescue (both United Kingdom).
Liffey	United Kingdom	The barque was driven ashore and wrecked at Kilmore, Ireland. She was on a voyage from Saint John's, Newfoundland Colony to Liverpool, Lancashire.
Red Rose	United Kingdom	The cutter ran aground at Great Yarmouth and was wrecked. Her crew were rescued.
Solide	United Kingdom	The barque sprang a leak and was abandoned off Montão de Trigo Island, Brazil. She foundered the next day.

== 3 November ==
List of shipwrecks: 3 November 1881
Ship	State	Description
Henrietta	Norway	The full-rigged ship was abandoned in a sinking condition and caught fire. Her crew were rescued by the barque Mendoza (United Kingdom).
Kaffraria	United Kingdom	The steamship ran aground "at Haff". She was refloated on 5 November and taken in to Pillau, Germany.

== 4 November ==
List of shipwrecks: 4 November 1881
Ship	State	Description
City of Dunedin	United Kingdom	The ship departed from Pensacola, Florida, United States for Cardiff, Glamorgan. No further trace, reported missing.
Coronet	United Kingdom	The full-rigged ship was abandoned in the Atlantic Ocean. Her eighteen crew were rescued by the brigantine Trust (United Kingdom). Coronet was on a voyage from Liverpool, Lancashire to Musquash, New Brunswick, Canada.
Cypriano	France	The steamship ran aground at Ergasteria, Greece. She was refloated and taken in to Ergasteria.
Glenwilliam	United Kingdom	The steamship ran aground on the Horse Bank, in Liverpool Bay. She was on a voyage from Garston, Lancashire to Seville, Spain. She was refloated.
Neptun	Netherlands	The barque was abandoned in the North Sea. Her crew were rescued by the schooner Caldedonia (United Kingdom); her captain refused to leave. Neptun was on a voyage from Riga, Russia to Amsterdam, North Holland.
War Eagle	United States	The steamboat collided with a drawbridge at Keokuk, Iowa and was wrecked with the loss of eight lives.

== 5 November ==
List of shipwrecks: 5 November 1881
Ship	State	Description
Albion	United States of Colombia	The steamship foundered off Barbacoas Point with the loss of 32 of the 40 people on board. She was on a voyage from the River Sinn to Cartagena.
Drumtochty	United Kingdom	The steamship was driven ashore near Troon, Ayrshire. She was on a voyage from the River Duddon to Troon.
La Marie Françoise	France	The ketch was driven ashore at Littlestone-on-Sea, Kent, United Kingdom. She was refloated and assisted in to Dover, Kent.
Limosa	United Kingdom	The steamship ran aground at Kertch, Russia.
Sandsend	United Kingdom	The steamship was driven ashore 10 nautical miles (19 km) from Flensburg, Germany. She was on a voyage from Hartlepool, County Durham to Flensburg. She was reflaoted and taken in to Flensburg.
Vriendschap	Netherlands	The kuff sprang a leak and was beached at Lemvig, Denmark. Her crew were rescued. She was on a voyage from Riga, Russia to Delfzijl, Groningen.

== 6 November ==
List of shipwrecks: 6 November 1881
Ship	State	Description
Elgina, and Vulcan	United Kingdom	The steamship Elgina collided with the smack Vulcan in the Clyde. Both vessels were severely damaged. Elgina put back to Glasgow, Renfrewshire. Vulcan put in to Greenock, Renfrewshire.
Lady Mostyn, and R. L. Alston	United Kingdom	The steamships collided in the River Tees and were both severely damaged.Lady Mostyn was on a voyage from Middlesbrough to Llanelly, Glamorgan. She was beached and later refloated. R. L. Alston was on a voyage from Riga, Russia to Middlesbrough. Both vessels were taken in to Middlesbrough, Yorkshire.
Thetis	Norway	The brig was discovered abandoned in the North Sea 5 nautical miles (9.3 km) off the Farne Islands, Northumberland, United Kingdom by the steamship Sumus (United Kingdom). She was towed in to Peterhead, Aberdeenshire, United Kingdom.

== 7 November ==
List of shipwrecks: 7 November 1881
Ship	State	Description
England's Glory	United Kingdom	The ship was wrecked at Bluff, New Zealand. Her crew survived. She was on a voyage from London to Bluff.
Shamrock	United Kingdom	The steamship ran aground on the Goodwin Sands, Kent. She was on a voyage from Grangemouth, Stirlingshire to Barcelona, Spain. She was refloated with assistance from the tug Victor (United Kingdom) and taken into The Downs.
William and Susan	United Kingdom	The dandy collided with the steamship Reliance ( (United Kingdom of Great Britain and Ireland) Isle of Man) and sank 1 nautical mile (1.9 km) north east of the Whiteford Lighthouse, Glamorgan. Her crew were rescued by Reliance.

== 8 November ==
List of shipwrecks: 8 November 1881
Ship	State	Description
Carmona	United Kingdom	The steamship ran aground on the Nore. She was refloated with the assistance of six barges.
Crest	United Kingdom	The steamship caught fire at sea. A crew member was severely wounded. She was on a voyage from Gibraltar to South Shields, County Durham. The fire was extinguished.
James Hall	United Kingdom	The steamship ran aground in the River Tees. She was refloated with the assistance of a tug and found to be leaky.
Lockyer	United Kingdom	The steamship was sighted off the Sand Heads whilst on a voyage from Calcutta, India to London. No further trace, presumed foundered with the loss of all 26 people on board.

== 9 November ==
List of shipwrecks: 9 November 1881
Ship	State	Description
Langrigg	United Kingdom	The ship departed from Whitehaven, Cumberland for Clarecastle, County Clare. No further trace, reported missing.

== 10 November ==
List of shipwrecks: 10 November 1881
Ship	State	Description
Caroline Martin	United Kingdom	The schooner was driven ashore and wrecked at "Dongnosen Point".
Dolphin	Denmark	The schooner foundered 7 nautical miles (13 km) south of the Frenchman's Rock with the loss of one of her eight crew. She was on a voyage from Saint Thomas to Christiansted, Saint Croix, Virgin Islands.
Florence	United Kingdom	The brig was abandoned in the Atlantic Ocean (44°00′N 43°30′W). Her crew were rescued by the barque Blanche (United Kingdom).
Ocean Wave	United Kingdom	The ship was run into by the steamship Brenda (United Kingdom) and sank in the River Thames at Blackwall, Middlesex. Her crew survived.

== 11 November ==
List of shipwrecks: 11 November 1881
Ship	State	Description
Ardenlea	United Kingdom	The ship was driven ashore and severely damaged in Rothesay Bay. She was on a voyage from Greenock, Renfrewshire to Cardiff, Glamorgan. She was declared a total loss.
Athlete	Tasmania	The steamship struck an uncharted rock in the Banks Strait off the Forster Islands and was beached. She was on a voyage from Launceston to Hobart.
Charles Murdoch	United Kingdom	The ship departed from Philadelphia, Pennsylvania, United States for London. No further trace, reported missing.
Fairy	United Kingdom	The steamship was run into by the steamship Fervent and sank in the North Sea 20 nautical miles (37 km) off Flamborough Head, Yorkshire. All on board were rescued by Fervent. Fairy was on a voyage from the River Tyne to Great Yarmouth, Norfolk.
Kappa	Flag unknown	The ship ran aground off Point Lynas, Anglesey, United Kingdom. She was on a voyage from "Tattal" to Liverpool, Lancashire, United Kingdom. She was refloated and completed her voyage in a severely leaky condition.
Nautilus	United Kingdom	The steamship sank at Finkenwerder, Germany. She was on a voyage from Hamburg, Germany to London. She was refloated on 13 November and beached at Hamburg.
Ranee	United Kingdom	The steamship collided with the tug Ranger (United Kingdom) and was beached at Garston, Lancashire.
Scio	United Kingdom	The brig struck the Heriot Rocks and became leaky. She was on a voyage from Leith, Lothian to Copenhagen, Denmark. She put back to Leith for repairs.

== 12 November ==
List of shipwrecks: 12 November 1881
Ship	State	Description
Alverton	United Kingdom	The steamship ran ashore 10 nautical miles (19 km) from Mugia, Portugal. She was on a voyage from Bilbao, Spain to Cette, Hérault, France. The crew survived.
Brunswick, and Carlingford	United States	The steamship Brunswick collided with the schooner Carlingford (United States) and sank 10 nautical miles (19 km) east of Dunkirk, New York. Three crewmen killed when a lifeboat was capsized by the sinking ship. Carlingford sank with the loss of a crew member.
Chieftain	Norway	The barque was wrecked on Jederens Reef, in the Baltic Sea. Her crew were rescued.
Frank	United Kingdom	The Thames barge was run into by the steamship Gilsland (United Kingdom) and sank in the River Thames, at Shadwell, Middlesex.
Hobart, and Salisbury	India	The steam hopper barges collided at Madras and sank with the loss of sixteen of the twenty people on board.
Otto	Germany	The brig was driven ashore and wrecked at Thisted, Denmark. She was on a voyage from Liverpool, Lancashire, United Kingdom to Reval, Russia.

== 13 November ==
List of shipwrecks: 13 November 1881
Ship	State	Description
City of London	United Kingdom	The steamship departed from London for New York, United States. She subsequently foundered in the Atlantic Ocean with the loss of all 41 people on board. Wreckage from the ship washed up at Kilkee, County Clare on 21 February 1882.
Harvest	United Kingdom	The steamship was driven ashore near the Kullen Lighthouse, Sweden. She was on a voyage from Hartlepool, County Durham to Swinemünde, Germany.
Lydia	United Kingdom	The barque departed from Niuzhuang, China. Subsequently lost with all on board. The body of the captain's wife washed up on "Iron Island", in the "Gulf of Petchelee".

== 14 November ==
List of shipwrecks: 14 November 1881
Ship	State	Description
Dot	Canada	The ship was sighted in the Gut of Canso whilst on a voyage from Crapaud, Prince Edward Island to Cardiff, Glamorgan, United Kingdom. No further trace, reported missing.

== 15 November ==
List of shipwrecks: 15 November 1881
Ship	State	Description
Morea	United Kingdom	The steamship was sighted off Constantinople, Ottoman Empire whilst on a voyage from Odesa, Russia to London. Presumed subsequently foundered in the Mediterranean Sea with the loss of all hands, 25 or 26 lives, possibly after colliding with another steamship; wreckage thought to be from Morea and the other vessel washed up on Gozo, Malta. A longboat from Morea was discovered at 35°00′N 18°25′E by the barque St. Olaf (Norway).

== 16 November ==
List of shipwrecks: 16 November 1881
Ship	State	Description
Flamingo	United Kingdom	The steamship was driven ashore and severely damaged at St. Margaret's Bay, Kent. Her crew were rescued. Flamingo was on a voyage from London to Calcutta, India. She was declared a total loss, and broke in two in late December.
Highbury	United Kingdom	The steamship ran aground off Falsterbo, Sweden. She was on a voyage from Kronstadt, Russia to the Black Sea. She broke in two and sank the next day. Her crew were rescued.
H. J. Pallisen	Denmark	The steamship was driven ashore on Dragør.
Otterburn	United Kingdom	The brig was wrecked on the Longsand, in the North Sea off the coast of Essex. She was on a voyage from Newcastle upon Tyne, Northumberland to Boulogne, Pas-de-Calais, France. She was refloated but found to be severely leaky and was beached on the Longsand. Otterburn was abandoned the next day, her crew getting aboard the Kentish Knock Lightship ( Trinity House), from where they were rescued by the yacht Argus ( Trinity House).
Pilgrim	United Kingdom	The ship was driven ashore at Cardiff, Glamorgan. She was on a voyage from Cardiff to Palermo, Sicily, Italy. She was later refloated and towed in to Cardiff for repairs, being leaky.
Send	United Kingdom	The smack was driven ashore at Caister-on-Sea, Norfolk. Nine of her twelve crew were rescued by the Caister Lifeboat, the rest got aboard the Cockle Lightship ( Trinity House). Send subsequently sank.
Solway	United Kingdom	The steamship caught fire in the Irish Sea 20 nautical miles (37 km) off Rockabill, County Dublin with the loss of twelve of the 33 people on board. Six people were reported missing, three were severely wounded. Solway was on a voyage from Glasgow, Renfrewshire to Bristol, Gloucestershire. She was assisted in to Dublin by the steamship Caledonia (United Kingdom).
Urd	Norway	The schooner was driven ashore on "Kraaka" and wrecked. Her crew were rescued. She was on a voyage from Fredrikshald to Harwich, Essex.
William and Lucy	United Kingdom	The ship was wrecked on the Longsand. Her crew were rescued by a fishing smack. William and Lucy was on a voyage from London to King's Lynn, Norfolk.

== 17 November ==
List of shipwrecks: 17 November 1881
Ship	State	Description
Ægean	United Kingdom	The steamship ran aground at Burntisland, Fife. She was on a voyage from Burntisland to Copenhagen, Denmark.
Brankston	United Kingdom	The steamship struck the pier in the Nieuwe Waterweg and sank. Her crew were rescued by the Maassluis Lifeboat. She was on a voyage from Rotterdam, South Holland, Netherlands to Bilbao, Spain.
Martinique	France	The steamship was driven ashore at Cape Bon, Algeria. She was on a voyage from Tunis, Tunisia to Susa, Persia.
Morna	United Kingdom	The steam yacht collided with the pier at Sheerness, Kent and ran aground. She was severely damaged.

== 18 November ==
List of shipwrecks: 18 November 1881
Ship	State	Description
Prstis	Greece	The brig was driven ashore near "Galippa", Tunisia. She was on a voyage from Messina, Sicily, Italy to Gibraltar.
Snipe	United Kingdom	The yacht collided with the steamship Inveraray Castle (United Kingdom) and sank in Loch Fyne. All on board survived.
Unnamed	Flag unknown	The barque was driven ashore and wrecked at Limerick, United Kingdom with the loss of all hands.

== 19 November ==
List of shipwrecks: 19 November 1881
Ship	State	Description
Boreas	Norway	The brig was driven ashore and wrecked at Maranhão, Brazil with the loss of two of her crew. She was on a voyage from Cardiff, Glamorgan, United Kingdom to Maranhão.
Suliote	United Kingdom	The ship was driven ashore at Lamlash, Isle of Arran. She was on a voyage from Greenock, Renfrewshire to Valparaíso, Chile.
Whitwell	United Kingdom	The sailing barge was driven ashore at Lydd, Kent. Her crew were rescued. She was on a voyage from Saint-Valery-sur-Somme, Somme, France to London.

== 20 November ==
List of shipwrecks: 20 November 1881
Ship	State	Description
Anonyma	United Kingdom	The schooner was driven ashore in Loch Eribol.
Dora	United Kingdom	The steamship collided with the steamship Otto (United Kingdom) and sank at the mouth of the River Tyne. Dora was on a voyage from Pomaron, Portugal to the River Tyne.
Elizabeth Barclay	(United Kingdom of Great Britain and Ireland) Isle of Man	The schooner struck the Conister Rock and foundered. She was on a voyage from Garston, Lancashire to Newry, County Antrim.
Florence	United Kingdom	The Thames barge collided with the steamship Grenadier (United Kingdom) in the River Thames and was severely damaged.
Gem	United Kingdom	The steamboat broke from her moorings in St Mary's Pool, Isles of Scilly and went ashore at William's Bay, becoming a total wreck. Gem was bound for Southern Africa for employment as a river boat. Three crew were rescued by the pilot-cutter Presto (United Kingdom).
Ida and Picciola	Flag unknown Norway	The ships collided and were both severely damaged. Both were on a voyage from Söderhamn, Sweden to a French port. Both put in to Malmö, Sweden.
Providentia	Denmark	The ship was driven ashore at Narva, Russia. She was on a voyage from the grand Duchy of Finland to Newcastle upon Tyne, Northumberland, United Kingdom.
Rosebud	United Kingdom	The brig foundered in the North Sea off Dunwich, Suffolk. Her crew were rescued. Shew as on a voyage from Blyth, Northumberland to Chatham, Kent.
Thomas Cochran	(Dominion of Newfoundland) Newfoundland Colony	The barque was driven ashore and wrecked 1 nautical mile (1.9 km) south of the mouth of the River Don. Her crew were rescued. She was on a voyage from Leith, Lothian, United Kingdom to Demerara, British Guiana.
Warrior	United Kingdom	The barque was driven ashore and wrecked at Homs, Ottoman Tripolitania with the loss of five of her nineteen crew.

== 21 November ==
List of shipwrecks: 21 November 1881
Ship	State	Description
Columbus	United Kingdom	The ship was driven ashore and severely damaged at Queenstown, County Cork.
Dryburgh Abbey	United Kingdom	The steamship ran aground on the Maplin Sand, in the North Sea off the coast of Essex. She was refloated the next day.
Ellen	United Kingdom	The smack collided with the ship Meridian (United Kingdom) off Moelfre, Anglesey and was abandoned. Her crew were rescued by Meridian.
Gem	United Kingdom	The steamship was driven ashore and wrecked in the Isles of Scilly.
Gladstone	United Kingdom	The tug was damaged by fire at Millwall, Essex.
Hiawatha	United Kingdom	The ship caught fire at Pernambuco, Brazil. She was on a voyage from Swansea, Glamorgan to Pernambuco.
Laurentia	Russia	The brig was driven ashore at Kuressaare.
Warne	United Kingdom	The steamship was driven ashore in the Yenikale Channel. She was on a voyage from London to Kertch, Russia.

== 22 November ==
List of shipwrecks: 22 November 1881
Ship	State	Description
Anetta	United Kingdom	The ship was driven ashore on the Horse Isle, in the Firth of Clyde with the loss of three of her six crew. She was on a voyage from Bowling, Dunbartonshire to Ardrossan, Ayrshire.
Barbara	United Kingdom	The barque was driven ashore and wrecked at Freshwater West, Pembrokeshire with the loss of one of the sixteen people on board. She was on a voyage from Rangoon, Burma to Zanzibar and Cardiff, Glamorgan.
Culzean	United Kingdom	The ship was driven ashore and wrecked in Lagg Bay with the loss of all eighteen crew. She was being towed from Dundee, Forfarshire to Greenock, Renfrewshire by the tug Conqueror (United Kingdom).
Henry Edye	Belgium	The steamship was sighted off the Isle of Wight, United Kingdom. No further trace, presumed foundered with the loss of all on board on or about 27 November.
Isabel	United Kingdom	The brigantine was driven ashore near Port Talbot, Glamorgan. She was on a voyage from St. Ubes, Portugal to Port Talbot.
Isabella	United Kingdom	The ship was driven ashore at Lindisfarne, Northumberland.
Mary Catherine	United Kingdom	The schooner was driven ashore in Dowling's Bay, County Donegal.
Nerissa	United Kingdom	The steamship ran aground west of Tenedos, Ottoman Empire. She was refloated on 25 November.
Patriot	United Kingdom	The ship was driven ashore and wrecked at Doolough, County Mayo with the loss of three lives. She was on a voyage from Ardrossan, Ayrshire to Galway.
Queen	United Kingdom	The ship was driven ashore at Lindisfarne.
S. Nicola	Greece	The brig was beached at Homs, Ottoman Tripolitania in a waterlogged condition. Her crew were rescued.
St. Fillan	United Kingdom	The brigantine collided with the schooner Victoire (United Kingdom) and foundered off Saltcoats, Ayrshire. Her crew were rescued by Victoire. St. Fillan was on a voyage from Belfast, County Antrim to Ayr.
T. W. Harris	United Kingdom	The brigantine foundered off Ayr with the loss of three of her five crew. Survivors were rescued by the Ayr Lifeboat.

== 23 November ==
List of shipwrecks: 23 November 1881
Ship	State	Description
Annabelle	United Kingdom	The ship was driven ashore at Spanish Point, County Clare. Her crew were rescued.
Bedouin	United Kingdom	The ship was driven ashore at Spanish Point. Her crew were rescued.
Moderator	United Kingdom	The steam barge collided with the steam barge Dart (United Kingdom) in the River Avon and was beached near the Clifton Suspension Bridge.

== 24 November ==
List of shipwrecks: 24 November 1881
Ship	State	Description
Cordelia	United Kingdom	The ship collided with the steamship Upapa (United Kingdom) and was abandoned in the New Deeps. Her crew were rescued by Upapa. Cordelia was on a voyage from Saint John's, Newfoundland Colony to London. She was towed in to Gravesend, Kent by the tug Dreadnought (United Kingdom).
F. W. Gaylord	United States	The steamship collided with the steamship D. T. Lane (United States) and sank in the Ohio River. Her cook was drowned.
Konkordia	United Kingdom	The barque ran aground at Exmouth, Devon, United Kingdom. She was on a voyage from New York, United States to Exmouth. She was refloated the next day and taken in to Exmouth.
Lily of Devon	United Kingdom	The fishing smack struck the pier at Lowestoft, Suffolk and sank.
Oncle Felix	France	The ship was abandoned in the Atlantic Ocean (49°06′N 11°35′W). Her crew were rescued by Mikado (United Kingdom). Oncle Felix was on a voyage from Cardiff, Glamorgan, United Kingdom to Valparaíso, Chile.

== 25 November ==
List of shipwrecks: 25 November 1881
Ship	State	Description
Hebe	United Kingdom	The schooner was beached on Fair Isle, where she became a wreck. Her four crew were rescued. She was on a voyage from Lossiemouth, Moray to Sunderland, County Durham.
Jane Miller	Canada	The steamship foundered in Colpoy's Bay, Ontario with the loss of all 26 people on board.
Minerva	United Kingdom	The ship was towed in the Queenstown, County Cork in a waterlogged condition. She was on a voyage from New Richmond, Quebec, Canada to Glasson Dock, Lancashire.

== 26 November ==
List of shipwrecks: 26 November 1881
Ship	State	Description
Arne	United Kingdom	The ship was wrecked at Saint François. She was on a voyage from Newport, Monmouthshire, United Kingdom to Saint François.
Baltic	Sweden	The barque was driven ashore at Höganäs.
British Navy	United Kingdom	The full-rigged ship was driven into the full-rigged ship Larnaca (United Kingdom) and sank off Margate, Kent with the loss of 22 lives, including one from Larnaca. Eighteen survivors from British Navy were rescued by Larnaca and three by the tug Cruiser (United Kingdom). British Navy was on a voyage from London to Sydney, New South Wales
Champion	United Kingdom	The fishing smack was lost on the Red Sand, off the Kent coast. Her crew were rescued by the tug Douro (United Kingdom).
Countess	United Kingdom	The brig was driven ashore at Great Yarmouth, Norfolk. Her crew were rescued. She was on a voyage from Sunderland, County Durham to Weymouth, Dorset.
Excelsior	Germany	The barque was driven ashore and sank at Crother's Point, St Martin's, Isles of Scilly, United Kingdom. She was refloated on 22 January 1882 and taken in tow by the tugs Lady of the Lake and Queen of the Bay (both United Kingdom), when she capsized and sank. There were no deaths.
Foam	United Kingdom	The schooner was driven ashore at Kingstown, County Dublin. She was on a voyage from Lindisfarne, Northumberland to Bristol, Gloucestershire. She was refloated and found to be leaky.
George Clark	United Kingdom	The brig was driven ashore at South Shields, County Durham. Her crew were rescued. She was on a voyage from Boulogne, Pas-de-Calais, France to South Shields.
Ida	United Kingdom	The barge was driven ashore at South Shields. Her crew were rescued. She was on a voyage from Ipswich, Suffolk to South Shields.
Isabella	United Kingdom	The brigantine was driven ashore and wrecked at the Mumbles, Glamorgan.
John and Frederick	United Kingdom	The fishing smack was severely damaged in the North Sea off the coast of Norfolk with the loss of a crew member. She put in to Great Yarmouth on 29 November.
Laura	United Kingdom	The schooner was driven ashore at Sharpness, Gloucestershire.
L'Esperance	France	The brigantine ran into the brigantine Pest (United Kingdom) and sank in The Downs. Her seven crew were rescued; five by the smack Refuge (United Kingdom) and two by a French schooner.
Malaga	Germany	The steamship ran aground off Dungeness, Kent. She was on a voyage from Hamburg to Lisbon, Portugal. She was refloated the next day and taken in to Dover, Kent in a leaky condition.
Michael Henry	Royal National Lifeboat Institution	The lifeboat capsized whilst going to the assistance of the brigantine Harriet (United Kingdom). She was driven ashore at Newhaven, Sussex. Her thirteen crew survived. She was consequently condemned.
Monitor	United Kingdom	The ship was lost off the North Foreland, Kent. Her crew were rescued.
Polly	United Kingdom	The ship was wrecked on the coast of Tabasco, Mexico. Her crew were rescued. She was on a voyage from Saint Thomas, Virgin Islands to the English Channel.
Providence	United Kingdom	The Thames barge foundered off Whitstable, Kent. Her crew were rescued by the full-rigged ship Imberza (Norway).
Scio	United Kingdom	The brig was driven ashore and wrecked at Methil, Fife. Her crew were rescued.
Valuta	Norway	The barque was driven ashore at Cape Town, Cape Colony. She was on a voyage from Cardiff, Glamorgan, United Kingdom to Cape Town. She was refloated and taken in to Cape Town in a leaky condition.
Unnamed	(Nova Scotia) Canada	The barque was lost off the North Foreland. Her crew were rescued.
Three unnamed vessels	Flags unknown	Two barqued and a schooner were reported missing off Margate, Kent.

== 27 November ==
List of shipwrecks: 27 November 1881
Ship	State	Description
Albion	United Kingdom	The brigantine collided with two other vessels and was then driven ashore and wrecked at Ramsgate, Kent with the loss of two of her seven crew. Survivors were rescued by the Ramsgate Lifeboat Bradford ( Royal National Lifeboat Institution).
Baron van Pallandt	Netherlands	The barque was driven ashore in Jennycliff Bay. Her crew were rescued by the Plymouth Lifeboat, but her captain, first and second mates refused to leave. They later abandoned ship and reached shore in a boat.
Daring, and Lizzie Waters	United Kingdom	The brigs collided off Great Yarmouth, Norfolk and were both severely damaged. Daring was on a voyage from Sunderland, County Durham to Portsmouth, Hampshire. She also collided with the barge Cambria (United Kingdom). Lizzie Waters was on a voyage from Sunderland to Rochester, Kent. They were both towed in to Great Yarmouth for repairs.
Ellen and Elizabeth	United Kingdom	The ship was driven ashore at Formby, Lancashire. Her crew were rescued. She was on a voyage from Liverpool, Lancashire to Mostyn, Flintshire.
Frank Picard	France	The fishing lugger was driven ashore at Lydd, Kent with the loss of four of her seven crew. Survivors were rescued by the Coastguard using rocket apparatus.
Harvest Home	United Kingdom	The schooner was driven ashore at Workington, Cumberland.
Hetty Allen	United Kingdom	The ship was sighted in the Atlantic Ocean whilst on a voyage from Prince Edward Island, Canada for Aberystwyth, Cardiganshire. No further trace, reported missing.
Jackal	United Kingdom	The steamship foundered off Trevose Head, Cornwall with the loss of all hands. She was on a voyage from Padstow, Cornwall to Falmouth, Cornwall and the Natal Colony.
Jane Elsie	France	The schooner was abandoned off Great Yarmouth. There was no loss of life.
Liverpool	United Kingdom	The ship collided with Larnaca (flag unknown) in The Downs, sank. The captain, pilot and some of the crew were lost.
Lord Palmerston	United Kingdom	The full-rigged ship was abandoned in the Atlantic Ocean. Her crew were rescued by the steamship Jamaican (United Kingdom). Lord Palmerston was on a voyage from Saint John, New Brunswick, Canada to Cork.
Naval Reserve	Canada	The full-rigged ship was wrecked at St Bees, Cumberland All 25 crew were rescued. She was on a voyage from Liverpool to New York, United States.
Raaf	Netherlands	The schooner was driven ashore at the Rammekens Castle, Zeeland. She was on a voyage from Antwerp, Belgium to Malmö, Sweden. She was later refloated and towed in to Vlissingen, Zeeland.
San Fernando	Spain	The barque was driven ashore and wrecked at Cádiz. She was on a voyage from Boston, Massachusetts United States to Cádiz.
Unnamed barques	Flags unknown	Two barques were driven ashore at the "back" of the Isle of Wight, United Kingdom.
Unnamed	Flag unknown	A schooner ran aground on Scroby Sands, Norfolk. It is assumed that she was lost with all hands.

== 28 November ==
List of shipwrecks: 28 November 1881
Ship	State	Description
Annie Arbib	United Kingdom	The steamship was abandoned in the North Sea 30 nautical miles (56 km) off Great Yarmouth, Norfolk. Her crew were rescued. She was on a voyage from, Kronstadt, Russia to London.
Caduceus	United Kingdom	The ship ran aground on the Woolseners, in the English Channel off the coast of Hampshire and was wrecked. Her ten crew were rescued by the Bembridge Lifeboat. She was on a voyage from North Shields, Northumberland to Salerno, Italy.
Calzean	United Kingdom	The ship was driven ashore and wrecked in the Sound of Jura with the loss of all sixteen crew.
Century	United Kingdom	The ship was driven ashore at Caernarfon.
Constantina	Greece	The brigantine was driven ashore near Cape Bon, Tunisia.
Fritz von Godow	Germany	The brigantine ran aground and capsized at Caernarfon. Five of her crew were rescued. She was on a voyage from Belize City, British Honduras to Liverpool, Lancashire, United Kingdom.
Honour	United Kingdom	The schooner was holed by an anchor and put in to Queenborough, Kent. She was on a voyage from London to Plymouth, Devon. Subsequently taken in to Sheerness, Kent for repairs.
H. T. Stanes	United Kingdom	The brig foundered at sea. Her ten crew were rescued by the barque Albion (Norway). H. T. Stanes was on a voyage from Tobago to London.
John Herbert	United Kingdom	The ship was driven ashore at Caernarfon.
Martha Ann	United Kingdom	The ship was driven ashore at Caernarfon.

== 29 November ==
List of shipwrecks: 29 November 1881
Ship	State	Description
Alsace Lorraine, and Rhondda	France; United Kingdom	The steamships collided off Faro Point, Sicily, Italy. Alsace Lorraine sank. Her crew were rescued. She was on a voyage from Brindisi, Italy to Cette, Hérault. Rhondda was severely damaged. She was on a voyage from Marseille, Bouches-du-Rhône, France to Constantinople, Ottoman Empire. She put in to Messina, Sicily.
Annie Vernon	United Kingdom	The steamship was damaged by fire at Belfast, County Antrim.
Cape of Good Hope	United Kingdom	The brigantine was driven ashore and wrecked in Sebastian's Bay. Her crew were rescued. She was on a voyage from Montevideo, Uruguay to Cape Town, Cape Colony.
Recco Secundo	Italy	The barque was abandoned in the Atlantic Ocean (46°06′N 15°38′W). Her ten crew were rescued by the barque Cid (France). Recco Secundo was on a voyage from Pisagua, Chile to Falmouth, Cornwall or Queentown, County Cork, United Kingdom.
Romulus	United Kingdom	The steamship was run into by another steamship and was beached at Scutari, Ottoman Empire. She was on a voyage from Genoa, Italy to Odesa, Russia.

== 30 November ==
List of shipwrecks: 30 November 1881
Ship	State	Description
Alsace-Lorraine	France	The steamship was run into by the steamship Rhondda (United Kingdom) and sank off Messina, Sicily, Italy. She was on a voyage from Messina to Cette, Hérault, France.
Archiduc Rudolphe	Belgium	The steamship collided with the steamship Stephensons (United Kingdom) in the Scheldt at Antwerp. She was beached and sank. She was raised in 1898 and scrapped.
Fanny	(Dominion of Newfoundland) Newfoundland Colony	The ship was driven ashore and wrecked in Valersay Bay. She was on a voyage from Greenock, Renfrewshire, United Kingdom to Saint John's.
George	United Kingdom	The schooner was abandoned in the North Sea 60 nautical miles (110 km) off Tynemouth, Northumberland. All eight people on board were rescued by the barque Francesca (Norway).
India	United Kingdom	The steamship ran aground on the Ouse Sand, in the Thames Estuary. She was later refloated and towed back to London.
Pizzaro	Spain	The ship was wrecked at Pasaja. Her crew were rescued. she was on a voyage from Hamburg, Germany to Bilbao.

== Unknown date ==
List of shipwrecks: Unknown date in November 1881
Ship	State	Description
Achilles	United Kingdom	The ship was damaged by fire at San Francisco, California, United States after 18 November.
Ada Wiswell	United States	The schooner was lost whilst on a voyage from New York to Buenos Aires, Argentina. Her crew were rescued.
Albion	United Kingdom	The brigantine was driven ashore and wrecked at Ramsgate, Kent.
Alderman Ridley	United Kingdom	The tug sank a Belfast, County Antrim.
Althea	United Kingdom	The steamship was driven ashore at Taganrog, Russia.
Amigos	Spain	The barque was driven ashore at the Rammeken Castle, Zeeland, Netherlands. She was on a voyage from Antwerp, Belgium to Havana, Cuba.
Amphitrite	Germany	The barque was driven ashore and wrecked on Skagen, Denmark. She was on a voyage from London, United Kingdom to Memel.
Anna Bell	United Kingdom	The ship was driven ashore at Kilrush, County Clare and was abandoned by her crew.
Anna Jane	United Kingdom	The brigantine was abandoned at sea in a waterlogged condition. Her crew were rescued. She was on a voyage from Hamburg, Germany to Copenhagen, Denmark.
Anna Fell	United Kingdom	The brigantine was driven ashore in Boland Bay.
Arctic	United States	The ship was destroyed by fire in the Squan Inlet. She was on a voyage from Trieste to New York.
Arnon	Norway	The barque was driven ashore at Schull, County Cork, United Kingdom. Her crew were rescued by the Coastguard. She was on a voyage from Halifax, Nova Scotia, Canada to Caen, Calvados, France.
August	Sweden	The barque ran aground on the Haisborough Sands, in the North Sea off the coast of Norfolk, United Kingdom. She was on a voyage from Stockholm to London. She was refloated and towed in to Great Yarmouth, Norfolk.
Aurora	United Kingdom	The ship was wrecked on the Black Middens, in the North Sea off the mouth of the River Tyne.
Bedouin	United Kingdom	The schooner was driven ashore in Boland Bay.
Belle Aventure	United Kingdom	The schooner was driven ashore and wrecked at Kirkmaiden, Wigtownshire with the loss of three of her five crew. She was on a voyage from Gallipoli to Glasgow, Renfrewshire.
Bremen	Germany	The Weser lightship was run into by another vessel. She was consequently towed in to the Geeste.
Canadienne	United Kingdom	The steamship was driven ashore on White Island.
Catharine	Spain	The brigantine was wrecked. Her crew survived.
Catherine Jane	United Kingdom	The brigantine was driven ashore and wrecked near Clifden, County Galway. Her crew were rescued. She was on a voyage from Cardiff, Glamorgan to Tralee, County Kerry.
Charles Bal	United Kingdom	The ship collided with a railway bridge at Velsen, North Holland, Netherlands after 18 November. The bridge was severely damaged.
Claverhouse	United Kingdom	The barque ran aground at the mouth of the Mellacorée River and was wrecked before 17 November. She was on a voyage from Liverpool to the Mellacorée River.
Cleveland	United Kingdom	The steamship was driven ashore at the Kullen Lighthouse, Sweden. She was refloated and towed in to Copenhagen by a steamship.
Compton	United Kingdom	The steamship was driven ashore at Domesnes, Russia. She was on a voyage from Riga, Russia to London.
Concordia	United Kingdom	The ship was driven ashore. She was on a voyage from Lappohja, Grand Duchy of Finland to London. She was refloated and towed in to Karlshamn, Sweden in a leaky condition.
Crimea	United Kingdom	The ship was driven ashore at Killough, County Down.
Dagmar	Norway	The ship was abandoned in the Atlantic Ocean. Her crew were rescued by Festinalente ( Canada). Dagmar was on a voyage from Shediac, Nova Scotia, Canada to Dublin, United Kingdom. She was subsequently discovered by Herbert Beech ( Canada), which put four crew aboard. They took Dagmar in to Queenstown, County Cork, United Kingdom.
Edith Lorn	United Kingdom	The ship ran aground at the mouth of the Columbia River.
Eliza Spi	United States	The schooner was abandoned in the Atlantic Ocean before 11 November.
Emma Jane	United Kingdom	The pilot boat was driven ashore at Breaksea Point, Glamorgan.
Enterprise	United Kingdom	The ship was driven ashore at Carrickfergus, County Antrim.
Flora	United Kingdom	The ship collided with the steamship Virginia (United Kingdom) and sank at Fredrikshavn, Denmark.
Forest Deer	United Kingdom	The schooner was driven ashore in Stoke's Bay.
Fortuna	United States	The schooner was driven ashore in Palanan Bay.
France	France	The ship was lost at sea. Some of her crew were rescued, others were reported missing. She was on a voyage from Dunkirk, Nord to the Bull River.
Friends	United Kingdom	The ship was driven ashore at Lindisfarne, Northumberland.
Fritz von der Lancken	Germany	The barque was driven ashore at "Steenrevet". She was on a voyage from Danzig to the Natal Colony. She was refloated with assistance.
Gibraltar	Sweden	The steamship ran aground at Lonstrup, Denmark. She was on a voyage from Sunderland, County Durham, United Kingdom to Stockholm.
Glamorganshire	United Kingdom	The full-rigged ship was driven ashore at Dunkirk. She was on a voyage from New York to Dunkirk. She was later refloated and taken in to Dunkirk in a leaky condition with the assistance of a number of tugs.
Granite City	United Kingdom	The ship foundered at sea. Her crew were rescued by the barque Daniel Taylor (France). Granite City was on a voyage from Dalhousie, New Brunswick, Canada to Queenstown.
G. W. Wolff	United States	The ship ran aground in the Schuylkill River. She was on a voyage from Philadelphia, Pennsylvania to Belfast.
Hansine	Denmark	The ship was abandoned in the North Sea. Her crew were rescued. She was on a voyage from Hull, Yorkshire, United Kingdom to Aalborg.
H. A. Parr	Canada	The barque was abandoned at sea with the loss of her captain. Survivors were rescued by Carniola (United Kingdom).
H. B. Jones	Canada	The ship ran aground in the Bay of Bulls. She was on a voyage from Halifax, Nova Scotia to Betts Cove, Newfoundland Colony. She was refloated and found to be leaky.
Helen	Germany	The schooner was driven ashore at "Friberga", Öland, Sweden. She was on a voyage from "Sprangviken" to Papenburg.
Helen	United Kingdom	The smack was driven ashore on North Pharay, Orkney Islands. Her crew were rescued.
Henriette	United Kingdom	The ship was abandoned in the Atlantic Ocean. Her crew were rescued. She was on a voyage from South Shields, County Durham to Guadeloupe.
Iduna	Sweden	The schooner ran aground on the Kjarsgaard. She was on a voyage from Grimsby, Lincolnshire, United Kingdom to Malmö.
Imperial	United Kingdom	The ship became waterlogged and was abandoned off the Bird Rocks. She was on a voyage from Quebec City, Canada to Liverpool.
Innsfall	United Kingdom	The brig was wrecked on the Brake Sand, in the North Sea off the coast of Kent. Her eight crew were rescued by the Ramsgate Lifeboat Bradford ( Royal National Lifeboat Institution).
Isaiah	United Kingdom	The ship was driven ashore at Whiting Bay, Isle of Arran in a derelict condition.
James Ennis	United Kingdom	The fishing boat was wrecked at Bondicar, Northumberland. Her crew were rescued by the Bondicar Lifeboat.
Jane Cory	United Kingdom	The steamship was driven ashore at Ostby, Öland. She was on a voyage from Riga to West Hartlepool, County Durham. She was refloated and taken in to Copenhagen for repairs.
Jane Millin	United Kingdom	The ship was driven ashore and wrecked on the Butt of Lewis, Outer Hebrides.
Janthine	France	The schooner was driven ashore near Zierikzee, Zeeland.
Jeune Elise	France	The schooner was driven ashore and wrecked at Osmington, Dorset, United Kingdom. Her crew were rescued. She was on a voyage from Trouville, Manche to Swansea, Glamorgan.
John Davie	United Kingdom	The ship caught fire at Chittagong, India.
John Williamson	United Kingdom	The steamship was driven ashore near Gallipoli, Ottoman Empire. She was on a voyage from Leith, Lothian to Odesa, Russia.
Jovellanos	Spain	The steamship was wrecked at Pasaja between 16 and 26 November. She was on a voyage from Liverpool to Cádiz.
Juanita	Flag unknown	The ship was wrecked at the Brandy Pots. She was on a voyage from Montreal, Quebec, Canada to Rotterdam, South Holland, Netherlands.
Koomar	United Kingdom	The ship foundered in the Atlantic Ocean after 5 November with the loss of all nineteen crew. She was on a voyage from Quebec City to Newcastle upon Tyne, Northumberland.
Lambertha	Netherlands	The kuff was driven ashore. She was on a voyage from Fredrikstad, Norway to Kampen, Overijssel. She was refloated and put in to Kristiansand, Norway in a waterlogged condition.
Largo Law	United Kingdom	The ship caught fire at San Francisco.
Lauretta	United Kingdom	The barque was abandoned with the loss of a crew member. Survivors were rescued by the barque Maria Stoneman (United Kingdom). Lauretta was on a voyage from Quebec City to Conway, Caernarfonshire.
Leda	Germany	The schooner was driven ashore at the Rammekens Castle. She was on a voyage from Antwerp to Thessaloniki, Greece. She was refloated and towed in to Vlissingen, Zeeland.
Lizzie	United Kingdom	The ship was driven ashore at Lindisfarne.
Lottie	United Kingdom	The steamship ran aground in the Danube at Sulina, Romania.
Luigi V	Italy	The barque ran aground at Waterford, United Kingdom. She was on a voyage from Liverpool to New Orleans, Louisiana, United States.
Luna	United Kingdom	The schooner was driven ashore and severely damaged 3 nautical miles (5.6 km) west of Dunbar, Lothian. Her crew were rescued. She was on a voyage from Dysart, Fife to a French port.
Mardell	Norway	The ship was abandoned in the Atlantic Ocean (45°30′N 41°30′W). All 22 people on board were rescued by the barque Mermaid (United Kingdom).
Maria	(United Kingdom of Great Britain and Ireland) Isle of Man	The schooner was abandoned in the Irish Sea. She was towed in to Port Erin by the tug Fury ( (United Kingdom of Great Britain and Ireland) ) Isle of Man.
Maria	United Kingdom	The ship ran aground on the Bredegrund, in the Baltic Sea. She was on a voyage from Hull to Stockholm. She was refloated with assistance, and put in to Malmö on 22 November.
Mary Louise	United Kingdom	The ship was driven ashore and wrecked at Cairnbulg, Aberdeenshire. Her crew were rescued. She was on a voyage from Liverpool to Montrose, Forfarshire.
Masonic	United Kingdom	The ketch ran aground on the Blyth Sand, in the Thames Estuary, and sank.
Mercurius	Netherlands	The steamship ran aground at Maassluis, South Holland. She was on a voyage from Kronstadt, Russia to Rotterdam.
Morven	United Kingdom	The steamship ran aground on Hammond's Knoll, in the North Sea off the coast of Norfolk and broke her rudder. She was on a voyage from Kotka, Finland to London. She was refloated and taken to Great Yarmouth under sail. Subsequently towed to London by the tug Cruiser (United Kingdom).
Mouse	United Kingdom	The yacht was driven ashore in Loch Swin.
Nanny Latham	United Kingdom	The schooner was driven ashore and wrecked at Port Ellen, Islay. She was on a voyage from Loch Quily to Cardiff.
Necochea	Argentina	The ship was driven on to the Swash, in the Bristol Channel.
Nentwater	United Kingdom	The steamship was driven ashore 5 nautical miles (9.3 km) south of Bridlington, Yorkshire.
New Era	United States	The ship was driven ashore and wrecked at Cape Bojeador, Spanish East Indies. Her crew were rescued. She was on a voyage from Hong Kong to San Francisco.
Olga Elkan	United Kingdom	The schooner struck the breakwater at Cuxhaven, Germany and sank. Her crew were rescued. She was on a voyage from Hamburg to Runcorn, Cheshire.
Olympic Kuiper	Germany	The barque was driven ashore "at Kellen". She was on a voyage from Cardiff to Rostock.
Pallas	Germany	The ship was wrecked at Quemoy, Formosa before 23 November. Her crew were rescued.
Patriot	United Kingdom	The barque was wrecked at Doolough, County Mayo with the loss of three lives. She was on a voyage from Ardrossan, Ayrshire to Galway.
Polka	United Kingdom	The brig was driven ashore at Hartlepool, County Durham. She was on a voyage from London to Hartlepool.
Princess Royal	United Kingdom	The barque was abandoned in the Atlantic Ocean. Her crew were rescued by another barque. She was on a voyage from Quebec City to the Clyde.
Reaper	United Kingdom	The ship was driven ashore at Macduff, Aberdeenshire. She was on a voyage from Sunderland to Inverness. She was refloated and taken in to Macduff.
Retreiver	United Kingdom	The ship was driven ashore at Noordwijk, South Holland, Netherlands. She was refloated and taken in to IJmuiden, North Holland.
Rialto	United Kingdom	The steamship was damaged by fire at New York.
Rob Roy	United Kingdom	The steamship was driven ashore on Islay, Inner Hebrides.
Royal Arch	United Kingdom	The ship was driven ashore at Lindisfarne.
Sandringham	United Kingdom	The steamship was driven ashore on Haulbowline, County Cork.
Sarah Lightfoot	United Kingdom	The ship was driven ashore at Waterford.
Saturn	United Kingdom	The ship was driven ashore at "Settermullen", County Galway.
Sea Foam	United Kingdom	The barque was driven ashore near Stranraer, Wigtownshire. She was on a voyage from Liverpool to Cape Town, Cape Colony.
Sentinel	United Kingdom	The steamship was wrecked on the Dutch coast. All on board were rescued.
Shakespeare	United Kingdom	The ship was driven ashore in the Rio Grande at "Petelinga", Brazil. She was on a voyage from Liverpool to Calcutta, India.
Signal	Germany	The steamship was driven ashore on Kuressaare, Russia. She was on a voyage from Riga to Ghent, East Flanders, Belgium.
Speed	Norway	The brig was driven ashore at "Segarstadt", Öland.
Stag	United Kingdom	The steamship ran aground on the Elleboog Sandbank, in the Scheldt.
Stolaf	United Kingdom	The schooner was driven ashore and wrecked on Knob Point, Mainland, Shetland Islands. Her crew were rescued.
Thinca	Norway	The barque was driven ashore at Burntisland, Fife, United Kingdom. Her crew were rescued.
Thistle	United Kingdom	The brigantine was run into by the steamship Rebecca (United Kingdom) and sank in the English Channel off Dover, Kent. Her crew were rescued by Rebecca.
Thor	Norway	The brig was driven ashore at Sandhead, Wigtownshire. She was on a voyage from Dram to Liverpool.
Urania	Norway	The barque ran aground on the Kalkgrund, in the Baltic Sea. She was on a voyage from Riga to Dordrecht, South Holland. She was refloated and put in to Copenhagen.
Uranus	Norway	The barque was abandoned in the Atlantic Ocean and set afire. Her crew were rescued by the barque Templar Canada. Uranus was on a voyage from Ostend, West Flanders, Belgium to Musquobodoit Harbour, Nova Scotia, Canada.
Useful	United Kingdom	The fishing boat was driven ashore and wrecked on the Boulmer Rocks, on the coast of Northumberland. Her seven crew were rescued by a fishing boat.
Vesta	Russia	The barque was severely damaged by fire at Baltimore, Maryland, United States.
Visitor	United Kingdom	The schooner was driven ashore and wrecked at Lanlivet, Cornwall.
Vorwarts	Sweden	The ship was driven ashore at Bergkvara. She was on a voyage from Hudiksvall to Kiel, Germany. She was refloated and put in to Kalmar.
Wetherall	United Kingdom	The steamship was driven ashore at Saint-Jean-de-Luz, Basses-Pyrénées, France. She was on a voyage from South Shields, County Durham to Bilbao, Spain. She was later refloated and taken in to Bayonne, Basses-Pryénées.
Wilhelm	Germany	The steamship was driven ashore at Kristianopel, Sweden. She was on a voyage from Danzig to Kalmar, Sweden.
Williams	United Kingdom	The schooner was driven ashore at Islandmagee, County Antrim. She was on a voyage from Limerick to Liverpool.
Zeta	United Kingdom	The steamship was driven ashore at Craster, Caithness. Her crew were rescued.
Zetland	Norway	The ship was driven ashore on Pecks Beach, New Jersey, United States. She was on a voyage from the Turks Islands to New York.
Unnamed	Flag unknown	The steamship struck the Barrels Rock near Courtmacsherry Bay.
Unnamed	Flag unknown	The steamship ran aground on the Jenkin Sand, in the Thames Estuary.
