= Mister Grand International 2022 =

5th pageant of Mister Grand International

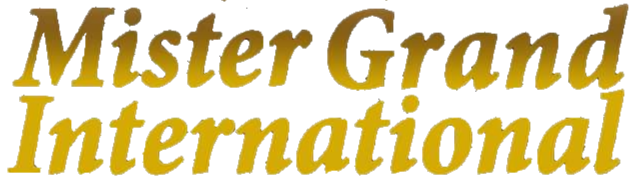
- Date: 25 November 2022
- Venue: Port of Spain, Trinidad and Tobago
- Broadcaster: YouTube / Facebook
- Entrants: 24
- Placements: 18
- Debuts: Belgium; Bolivia; Cambodia; Canada; Colombia; Czech Republic; Dominican Republic; France; Guatemala; Guyana; Honduras; India; Jamaica; Netherlands; Philippines; Portugal; Singapore; Suriname; Spain; Switzerland; Tahiti; Trinidad and Tobago; United States; Vietnam
- Winner: Michael Pelletier; Switzerland
- Congeniality: Eduardo Rivero (Bolivia)
- Personality: Aaron Tan (Singapore)
- Best National Costume: Vu Linh (Vietnam)
- Photogenic: Lorenzo Bottero (France)

Mister Grand International 2022 was the fifth edition of the Mister Grand International competition, held in Port of Spain, Trinidad and Tobago, on 25 November 2022.

Fernando Ezequiel Padin of Puerto Rico crowned Michael Pelletier of Switzerland as his successor at the end of the event.

== Results ==
Placements

The results of the event, in order, are as follows:

Placement	Contestant
Mister Grand International 2022	Switzerland – Michael Pelletier
1st Runner-up	Philippines – Kristzan Delos Santos
2nd Runner-up	Singapore – Aaron Tan
3rd Runner-up	Trinidad and Tobago – Aquil Ramsahai
4th Runner-up	Vietnam – Vu Linh
5th Runner-up	Tahiti – Teaniva Dinard
Top 12	Dominican Republic – Freddy Cordero; Portugal – Pepijn Van Lishout; Belgium – Enid Franca; Cambodia – Yu Thoanvannak; Spain – Harry Cruz
Top 18	Bolivia – Eduardo Rivero; Colombia – Andres Fernando Orta; Czech Republic – Denys Poljanskyj; France – Lorenzo Bottero; India – Nehal Patil; United States – Nathan Soria

=== Special awards ===
List of Mister Grand International 2022 awards.

Award	Contestant
Best in National Costume	Vietnam – Vu Linh
Mister Photogenic	France – Lorenzo Bottero
Mister Congeniality	Bolivia – Eduardo Rivero
Social Media Ambassador	Portugal – Pepijn Van Lishout ∆
Top Model	Vietnam – Vu Linh ∆
Best in Fashion Wear	Switzerland – Michael Pelletier
Best in Swimwear	Switzerland – Michael Pelletier
Mister Personality	Singapore – Aaron Tan
Best in Formal Wear	Philippines – Kristzan Delos Santos
Mister Sports Ambassador	Cambodia – You Thoanvannak
Mister Popular	Tahiti – Teaniva Dinard §

==== Note ====
- § – Automatic in Top 6
- ∆ – Automatic in Top 18

=== Mister Grand International 2022 (Brazil-based) results ===
List of Mr. Grand International based in Brazil.

Placements

Fifth Edition
Placement	Contestant
Mister Grand International 2022	Brazil – Gill Haupp
1st Runner-up	Paraguay – Felix Gamarra

Fifth Edition
Placement	Contestant
Mister Teen Grand International 2022	Paraguay – Gustavo Agustín Leguizamón
1st Runner-up	Mexico –

Special Awards

Award	Contestant
Best Top Model	Paraguay – Felix Gamarra

== Contestants ==
24 candidates competed for the title of Mister Grand International 2022.

Country/Territory	Candidates	Continent
Belgium	Enid Franca	Northwestern Europe
Bolivia	Eduardo Rivero	South America
Cambodia	Yothon Vannak	Asia
Canada		North America
Colombia	Andres Fernando Orta	South America
Czech Republic	Denys Poljanskyj	Central Europe
Dominican Republic	Freddy Cordero	North America
France	Lorenzo Bottero	Western Europe
Guatemala	Ehlvest Gomez	North America
Guyana		South America
Honduras		Central America
India	Nehal Patil	Asia
Jamaica		North America
Netherlands		Western Europe
Philippines	Kristzan Delos Santos	Asia
Portugal	Pepijn Van Lishout	Continental Europe
Singapore	Aaron Tan	Asia
Suriname		South America
Spain	Harry Cruz	Europe
Switzerland	Michael Pelletier	Central Europe
Tahiti	Teaniva Dinard	Oceania
Trinidad and Tobago	Aquil Ramsahai	South America
United States	Nathan Soria	North America
Vietnam	Vu Linh	Asia

== See also ==
- List of beauty pageants
