= Montão de Trigo Island =

Island in São Sebastião, São Paulo, Brazil

Native name: Ilha do Montão de Trigo
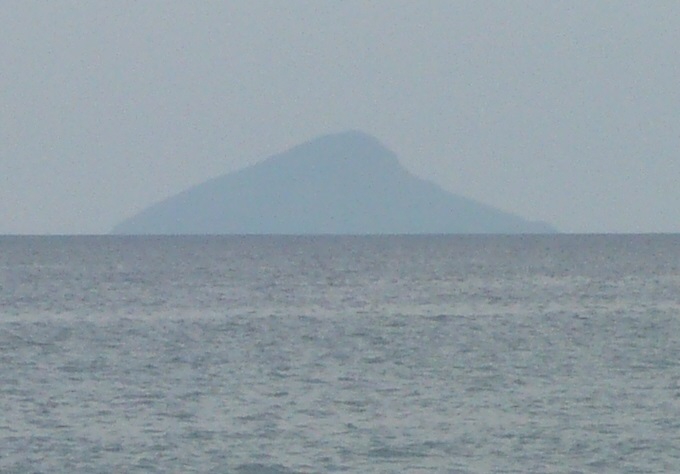
- Montão de Trigo Island seen from Santiago Beach

- Location within Brazil

Geography
- Location: Atlantic Ocean
- Coordinates: 23°51′50″S 45°46′54″W
- Highest elevation: 276 or 300 m (3 ft)

Administration
- Brazil
- Municipality: São Sebastião
- State: São Paulo
- Regions: Southeast

Demographics
- Demonym: Monteiro / Ilhéu
- Population: 58 (2020)
- Ethnic groups: Caiçaras

Montão de Trigo Island (sometimes called Monte de Trigo Island; lit "Big Pile of Wheat Island") is a Brazilian island 10 km south from the coast of São Sebastião, São Paulo. Its summit, which can be reached after a 40-minute walk, reaches a height of between 276-300m above sea level according to different sources and its depth varies between 3 and 20 m. The island is the result of intense ancient volcanic activities.

In between 20 minutes and half an hour, one can reach the island by renting a boat at the Juqueí and Barra do Una beaches. There are no beaches there, but access is made possible with an improvised pier. All the island's coastline is rocky, hindering or even blocking access at some points.

== Geography ==
The island is cone-shaped and resembles, as its name indicates, a big pile of wheat. Indeed, it was the Portuguese who named the island. Its area is of 1,3 km^{2} with its bigger axis being 1,5 km long and the shorter axis 1,3 km.

The island has rough terrain and is covered by the dense Atlantic Forest, which hinders exploration. The northwestern and southern sides of the island are called "caverns" by the locals, due to the rock formations that form them. The population concentrates in plain of approximately 300x600m.

The climate of the island is warm and humid like to rest of the state's coastline, with cold fronts being more common in the winter.

=== Wildlife ===
The local sea life is not very rich, but the island still offers caves and holes in its area where tourists can find pargos, badejos, grouper, lobsters, salemas and French angelfish, in couples or alone. Around the island, it's possible to sight penguins and cetaceans such as Bryde's whales and dolphins.

== Economy ==
Until the 20th century, the island had some agricultural activities, such as production of coffee, melado, mandioca and flour. According to some locals, agriculture was abandoned due to rats, which were supposedly brought with bricks used for the construction of the local school, which was opened in 1986. In 2003, some still kept small vegetable farms for personal consumption.

Almost all the island's inhabitants make a living out of artisanal fishing, since trawling is forbidden. In the past years, the fishes population have been decreasing, and by 2013, fishermen captured 1/6 of what they used to capture in 2005, due to the competition with bigger boats. However, in 2018, the Brazilian Ministry of the Environment limited the capture of mullets at the southern and southeastern coasts of Brazil, allowing for more of these fish to be found at the waters surrounding the island; in fact, by July of that year, eight tons of mullets were fished around the island. Some families make some extra money by selling handicrafts. In 2003, the city hall would help the locals by occasionally sending basic baskets, (Note: A "basic basket" is a package generally containing basic food and sometimes other supplies, reuniting everything that's considered essential for a Brazilian family's basic needs. It is annalogous to the American SNAP.) but the locals reported at that time that the help was only coming "sometimes".

== Population and infrastructure ==
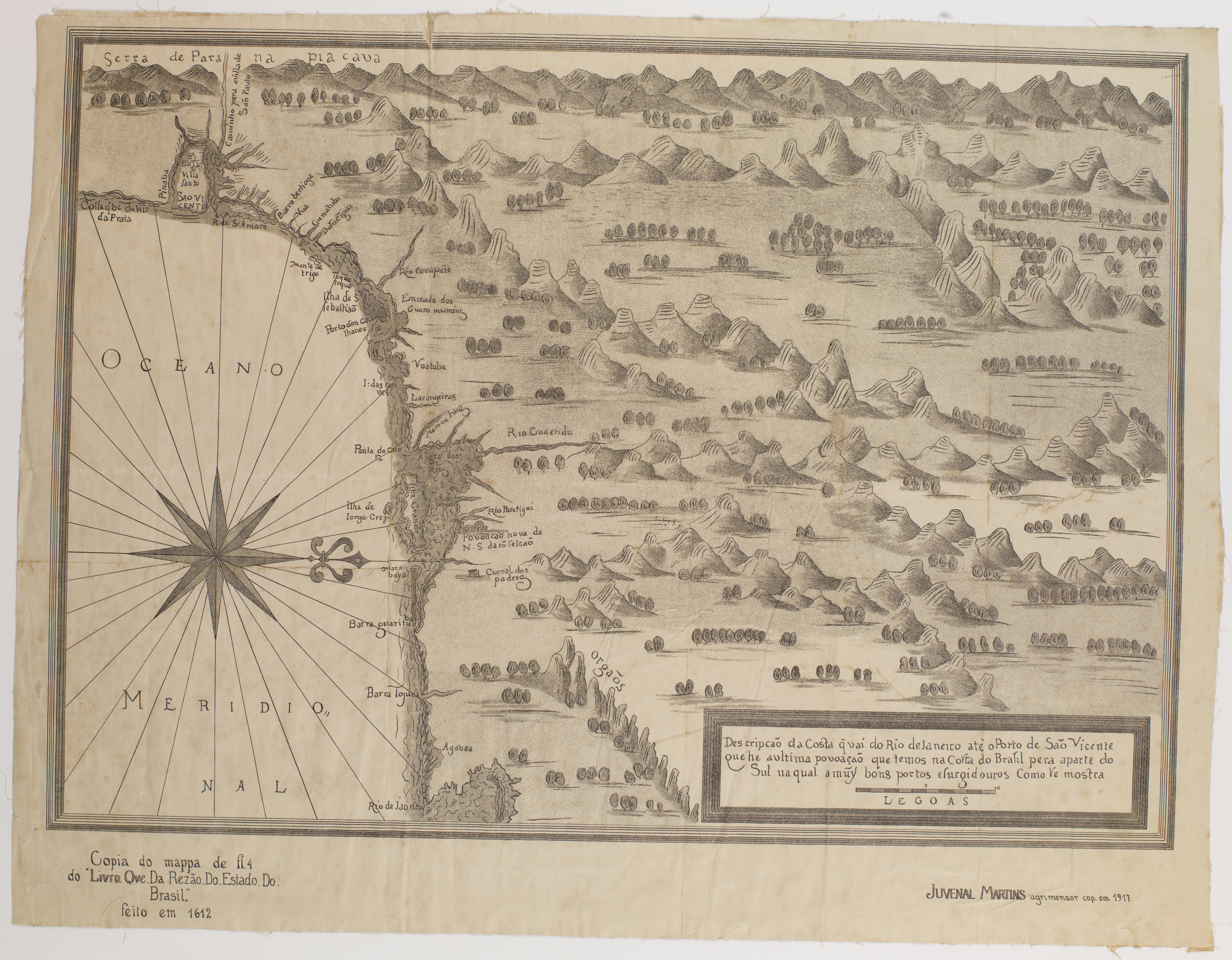
1612 map of part of the coastline of the states of São Paulo and Rio de Janeiro, with the island's location, still called "Monte de Trigo" at the time (Wheat Pile). The island is at the beginning of the sharp turn taken by the coastline in the drawing.

For the last three centuries, the island has been permanently inhabited by caiçara families (the population was around 200 in the mid-20th century, 40 in 1999 and in 2003, around 52 in January 2012 (a number that remained unchanged in March 2013 and in January 2014)), over 60 in August 2019 and 58 in 2020.

The locals are known as "monteiros" though they self-identify as "ilhéus". It's not known when the island began to be populated; locals mention different stories involving two couples of founding siblings; a sinking; or the arrival of three men in the 18th century. According to a story aired by TV show Fantástico in May 2020, the place had been inhabited for over 170 years according to her.

There's a rock on the island that's named "espia-barco" (lit. "spy-on-boat"); nearby Buzio and Vitória islands (which belong to the nearby city of Ilhabela) were once used as vintage points for watching over the surrounding waters in order to spot anti-slave trade enforcement boats. Therefore, the island may also have been used as a vantage point in the past.

In early 2012, the locals permission to occupy and explore the island, which still belongs to the government, but will no longer be subjected to real state projects. The permission is part of a program by the federal government which aims to benefit small villages with native people throughout the country. The permissions are called TAUS - Termo de Autorização de Uso Sustentável (Term of Authorization of Sustainable Use). Normally, they are given to river villages in Northern Brazil; this was the first time an island population received such benefit. With the TAUS, the locals can request improvements such as sewer, drinking water and housing programs. One of the rules imposed by the TAUS prohibits anyone to live there unless they were born there or they are married to one of the locals.

The local population lives with little infrastructure: until the mid-2010s, there was no electricity, so they relied on batteries. In 2020, however, many already used solar power. There's no sewer system and many houses have no toilets, so the locals urinate and defecate in external dry toilets or simply in the woods. In August 2019, São Sebastião's city hall announced it had installed equipment to make the water proper for human consumption in partnership with the state's government and private company Água Boa.

In 2020, many houses were made of recyclable materials; previously, they were made of wood, which made them vulnerable to termites.

In 2012, no doctor had visited the island for two years. In 2000, based on explorations made in the previous years, it was reported that in order to have access to fresh water, locals would collect water from the few sources of the island and keep it in water tanks so it could be later shared out with other families.

There's only one school, opened by the State Government in 1986 and which teaches up to the fourth grade (fifth since 2010), which has a bedroom for the teacher to spend the nights and only go back to mainland Brazil on the weekends.

Since most marriages occur among the same family, most inhabitants share the Oliveira surname.

The population is predominantly male, since many women get married and leave for mainland Brazil, while the ones who stay end up marrying their own cousins. It is also common for men to bring wives from the mainland, but some end up overwhelmed by the isolation and return. The local population speaks with a characteristic accent that could have been the result of centuries of isolation, according to USP linguist Luciana Storto.

When obtaining supplies is not possible, locals resort to typical dishes such as "navy blue" (made with green banana and mashed fish), the mashed "cará-de-espinho" or dry fish.

Until the 1980s, Catholic parties were common, but the arrival of Protestants spelled the end of such festivities.

=== Tourism ===
Montão de Trigo Island is appropriate for both free and scuba diving. The best season for the activity is the summer, when the waters' temperature rises and visibility improves. Windsurf is another popular activity there.
