= Mister Brazil =

National male beauty pageant competition in Brazil

- Formation: 1996
- Type: Beauty pageant
- Headquarters: Rio de Janeiro
- Location: Brazil
- Members: Mister World; Mister International; Manhunt International; Mister Supranational; Mister Global
- Official language: Portuguese
- Executive Board: Juliano Crema; Miro Sampaio; Mayck Carvalho
- Website: CNB

Mister Brazil (or Mister Brasil CNB, in Portuguese) is a traditional male beauty pageant held annually, responsible for selecting the most handsome and qualified candidate to compete in international beauty contests around the world. The event is guided by the motto "beauty with a purpose," as contestants are required to embrace a social cause before, during, and after the competition. The election of the most beautiful Brazilian representative takes place within the "Concurso Nacional de Beleza", led by entrepreneurs Miro Sampaio and Mayck Carvalho, alongside the doctor Juliano Crema. From 2007 to 2023, this responsibility belonged to the then-director of Global Beauties, Henrique Fontes, who now plays a prominent role in the media and communications division of the Miss World pageant.

== Titleholders ==
=== Mister Brazil ===
Color key

- Declared as International Winner

Year	Edition	Mister Brasil	Represented	Notes
1996	1	Thierre Di Castro	São Paulo	
1997	2	Edilson Ferreira	Federal District	
2000	3	Ramílio Zampiron	Federal District	
2001	4	Gustavo Gianetti	Rio de Janeiro	Mister World 2003
2007	5	Lucas Gil	Pará	
2008	6	Vinicius Ribeiro	Espírito Santo	
2010	7	Jonas Sulzbach	Rio Grande do Sul	
2011	8	Lucas Malvacini	Ilhas de Búzios	
2012	9	Willian Rëch	Rio Grande do Sul	
2013	10	Reinaldo Dalcin	Ilhas do Delta do Jacuí	
2014	11	Lucas Montandon	Federal District	
2015	12	Anderson Tomazini	Ilhabela	
2016	13	Carlos Franco	São Paulo	
2017	14	Matheus Song	Caminho dos Príncipes	
2018	15	Samuel Costa	São Paulo	
2019	16	Ítalo Cerqueira	Paraíba	
2020	17	William Gama	Amazonas	
2022	18	Guilherme Werner	Santa Catarina	
2023	19	Henrique Martins	São Paulo	
2024	20	Matheus Maia	Rio Grande do Sul	
2025	21	Lucas Laet	Rio de Janeiro	
2026	22	Eduardo Castillo	Greater Curitiba	

=== Mister Brazil for Mister World ===
Note: Before 2007, another organization was the responsible for the Brazilian representatives in the competition.

Color key

- Declared as Winner
- Ended as runner-up
- Ended as one of the finalists or semifinalists

Host/Year	Part.	Contestant	Age	Represented	Placement	Special Awards
2024	11	Eduardo Menezes	19	Paraná		
2019	10	Carlos Franco	27	São Paulo	Top 05	
2016	9	Lucas Montandon	26	Distrito Federal	Top 10	
2014	8	Reinaldo Dalcin	27	Rio Grande do Sul		
2012	7	Willian Rech	26	Rio Grande do Sul		
2010	6	Jonas Sulzbach	24	Rio Grande do Sul	Top 15	Top Model Challenge Winner
2007	5	Lucas Gil	23	Pará	1st runner-up	
2003	4	Gustavo Gianetti	24	Rio de Janeiro	Mister World 2003	
2000	3	Ramílio Zampiron	20	Distrito Federal	Top 10	
1998	2	Edilson Leite	20	Distrito Federal		
1996	1	Thierre Garrito	17	São Paulo		

=== Mister Brazil for Mister Supranational ===
Color key

- Declared as Winner
- Ended as runner-up
- Ended as one of the finalists or semifinalists

Host/Year	Part.	Contestant	Age	State	Placement	Special Awards
2026	10	Danton Miguel	33	São Paulo	Top 10	3 Awards
2025	9	Igor Thierry	24	Amazonas		
2024	8	Matheus Maia	26	Rio Grande do Sul	Top 20	Mister Fitness
2023	7	Henrique Martins	31	São Paulo	1st runner-up	
2022	6	Guilherme Werner	27	Santa Catarina	Top 10	Mister Supranational Americas
2021	5	João Henrique Lemes	23	Rio Grande de Sul		
2020	Due to the impact of COVID-19 pandemic, no pageant in 2020.					
2019	4	Ítalo Cerqueira	26	Rio de Janeiro	1st runner-up	
2018	3	Samuel Costa	24	São Paulo	2nd runner-up	Mountain Bike Challenge Winner
2017	2	Matheus Song	22	Santa Catarina	2nd runner-up	Top Model Challenge Winner
2016	1	Bruno Vanin	27	Rio Grande do Sul	3rd runner-up	

=== Mister Brazil for Mister International ===
Color key

- Declared as Winner
- Ended as runner-up
- Ended as one of the finalists or semifinalists

Host/Year	Part.	Contestant	Age	State	Placement	Special Awards
2026	10	Eduardo Castillo	28	Paraná		
2025	15	Rodrigo D'Soni	34	Santa Catarina	Top 11	Mister Congeniality
2024	14	Bruno Fonsêca	35	Rio Grande do Norte		
2023	13	Edward Ogunniya	32	Amazonas	2nd Runner-up	Smart Guy
2022	12	Luan Antonelli	32	Santa Catarina	Top 16	
2021						
2020
2019
2018	11	Danilson Furtado	25	Pará		
2017	10	Leonardo Nobre	28	Rio Grande do Norte		Mister Photogenic
2016	9	Ivo Cavalcanti	27	Paraíba	Top 16	
2015	8	Anderson Tomazini	27	Distrito Federal	1st runner-up	
2014	7	Matheus Martins	22	Minas Gerais	Top 10	
2013	6	Jhonatan Marko	23	Rio Grande do Sul	2nd runner-up	
2012	5	Ricardo Magryno	22	São Paulo	3rd runner-up	
2011	4	César Curti	24	São Paulo	Mister International 2011	Dream Man
2010	3	Caio Ribeiro	19	São Paulo	1st runner-up	
2009						
2008	2	Maciel Mendes	24	Minas Gerais	Top 10	
2007	1	Alan Martini	27	Rio Grande do Sul	Mister International 2007	Mister Spirit
2006						

=== Mister Brazil for Manhunt International ===
Color key

- Declared as Winner
- Ended as runner-up
- Ended as one of the finalists or semifinalists

Host/Year	Part.	Contestant	State	Placement	Special Awards
2026	20	Gustavo Gantus	Minas Gerais		
2025	19	Bernardo Lima	Rio de Janeiro		Mister Photogenic
2024	18	Ruan Mendes	Rio de Janeiro	8th runner-up	
2022	17	Hendson Baltazar	Ceará	Top 10	
2020	16	Matheus Giora	São Paulo	2nd runner-up	
2018	15	Jonatas Trevisan	Rio Grande do Sul	Top 16	
2017	14	Cristian Fin	Rio Grande do Sul	Top 16	Mister Personality
2016	13	Ramon Pissaia	Paraná	4th runner-up	
2012	12	Márcio Lusardo	Rio Grande do Sul		
2011	11	Lucas Malvacini	Minas Gerais		
2010	10	Marlon Di Gregori	Rio Grande do Sul	2nd runner-up	
2008	9	Thiago Testoni	Minas Gerais	Top 15	
2007	8	Paulo César Sales	Minas Gerais		
2006	7	Alex Assis Nunes	Rio Grande do Sul	Top 15	
2005	6	Alex Assis Nunes	Rio Grande do Sul		Mister Personality
2002	Brazil did not compete.				
2001	4	Leonardo Ramos	Pernambuco	Top 12	
2000	3	Diego Maniscalco	São Paulo		
1999	Brazil did not compete.				
1998	Brazil did not compete.				
1997	2	Carlos Alberto Azevêdo	Rio Grande do Sul		
1995	1	Antônio Robson Picolli	Paraná		
1994	Brazil did not compete.				
1993	Brazil did not compete.				

=== Mister Brazil for Mister Global ===
Color key

- Declared as Winner
- Ended as runner-up
- Ended as one of the finalists or semifinalists

Host/Year	Part.	Contestant	Age	State	Placement	Special Awards
2026	10	Yago Cavalcante	30	Pernambuco	Top 11	
2025	10	Lucas Laet	32	Rio de Janeiro	Top 20	
2024	9	Luiz Mascarenhas	25	Rio Grande do Sul	4th runner-up	Mister Congeniality & Mister Vincent Int.
2023	8	Luís Gustavo Peres	29	São Paulo		
2022	7	William Gama	24	Amazonas	2nd runner-up	
2021	6	Bruno Silva	30	Paraíba	Top 10	
2020	Due to the impact of COVID-19 pandemic, no pageant in 2020.					
2019	5	Gil Raupp	30	Rio Grande do Sul	Top 16	
2018	4	Júnior Garcia	27	Minas Gerais	Top 10	
2017	3	Pedro Gicca	29	São Paulo	Mister Global 2017	
2016	2	Giba Pignatti	29	São Paulo	3rd runner-up	
2015	1	Diogo Bernardes	21	Santa Catarina	3rd runner-up	
2014	Brazil did not compete.					

=== Mister Brazil for Mister Model International ===
Color key

- Declared as Winner
- Ended as runner-up
- Ended as one of the finalists or semifinalists

Host/Year	Part.	Contestant	Age	State	Placement	Special Awards
2026	10	Igor Oliveira	26	Paraíba	TBD	
2025	9	Jeferson Andrade	32	Rio Grande do Norte		
2024	8	Eduardo Horvath	29	São Paulo	Mister Model Int. 2024	
2023	No pageant held in 22-23					
2022	No pageant held in 22-23					
2021	7	Luís Gustavo Couto	25	Distrito Federal	1st runner-up	Mister Model Americas
2020	No pageant held in 2020					
2019	6	Gabriel Souza	24	Rio Grande do Sul	Top 16	Best Headshot
2018	5	Paolo Rayban			Top 16	Best Runway
2017	No pageant held in 2017					
2016	4	Felipe Vianello		Minas Gerais		
2015	3	Eduardo Mocelim	25	Paraná	2nd runner-up	
2014	2	Jhony Victor Santos	26	Paraná	Top 10	
2013	1	Willian Rëch	26	Rio Grande do Sul	Mister Model Int. 2013	
