= Míster España =

Spain's national male beauty pageant competition

- Formation: 1996
- Type: Male beauty pageant
- Headquarters: Madrid
- Location: Spain
- Members: Mister World Manhunt International
- Official language: Castilian Spanish
- Website: Official Site

Mister España (English: Míster Spain) is an annual Spanish beauty pageant for young men in Spain. It has evolved over time to become one of biggest pageants and frequently its delegates continue to perform well in international competitions.

== Titleholders ==
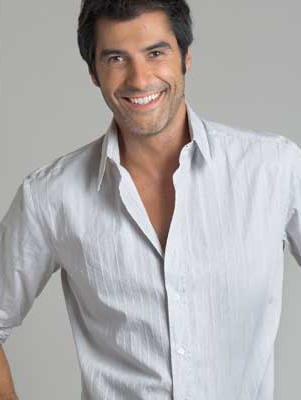
Jorge Fernández, Mister Spain 1999 and 2000. He was the only man to hold the Mister Spain title for two consecutive years, since there was no competition the following year.

Year	Míster España	Region	Notes
1996	José Gutiérrez Villar	A Coruña	
1997	Enrique Miranda	Cádiz	
1998	Manuel Roldán García	Córdoba	
1999	Jorge Fernández Madinabeitia	Gipuzkoa	
2000	Jorge Fernández Madinabeitia	Gipuzkoa	
2001	Pablo Martín	Murcia	
2002	Isaac Vidjrakou Burgos	Barcelona	
2003	Juan Antonio Ruiz	Almería	
2004	José Gómez	Biscay	
2005	Borja Alonso	A Coruña	
2006	Juan Francisco García Postigo	Málaga	Mister World 2007
2007	Luis Muñoz	Madrid	
2008	José Montalvo Senra	Madrid	
2009	Guillermo Becerril	Zaragoza	
2010	Carlos Alberto García	Las Palmas	
2011	Diego Otero Téllez	Toledo	
2013	Adrián Alcoholado	Málaga	
2014	David Roca Martínez	Valencia	
2015	Alejandro Nieto	Cádiz	
2016	Christian Pérez	Valencia	
2017	Rubén Castillero		
2018	Jesús Collado		
2019	Yeray Hernández	Las Palmas	
2020	Manuel Romo Cordero	Badajoz	
2021	Alexander Calvo	Málaga	
2022	Daniel Lorente Alonso	Murcia	
2023	Toni Company	Illes Balears	
2024	Francisco Zafra	Almería	
2025	Diego Gonzalez	Cardiz	
2026	Javier Iglesias	Illes Balears	

== International Placement ==
=== Mister World ===
Míster España traditionally represents the grand winners to the Mister World. Since 2012 Mister World Spain casts in separation casting. On occasion, when the winner does not qualify (due to age) for either contest, a runner-up is sent.

- : Declared as Winner
- : Ended as runner-up or top 5/6 qualification
- : Ended as one of the finalists or semifinalists
- : Ended as special awards winner

Year	Míster España	Region	Placement	Special Awards
2024	Antonio Company Toeps	Illes Balears	2nd Runner-Up	
2019	Daniel Torres Moreno	Málaga	Unplaced	
2016	Ángel Martínez Elul	Cartagena	Unplaced	
2014	José Ignacio Ros	Madrid	Unplaced	
2012	Álvaro Villanueva Santos	Seville	Unplaced	
2010	Guillermo Garcia Becerril	Zaragoza	Unplaced	
2007	Juan Francisco García Postigo	Málaga	Mister World 2007	
2003	Isaac Vidjrakou Burgos	Barcelona	Unplaced	
2000	Manuel Roldan Garcia	Córdoba	Unplaced	
1998	Enrique Miranda Garcia	Cádiz	Top 6	
1996	José Ramón Gutiérrez Villar	A Coruña	Unplaced	

=== Manhunt International ===
- : Declared as Winner
- : Ended as runner-up or top 5/6 qualification
- : Ended as one of the finalists or semifinalists
- : Ended as special awards winner

Year	Míster España	Region	Placement	Special Awards
2026	Darío Meroño	Murcia	TBA	TBA
2025	Enri Sánchez	Lleida	Top 20	Best Formal Wear
2024	Daniel Lorente	Murcia	5th Runner-up	CHAT Influencer
2022	Alexander Calvo	Málaga	Top 10	
2020	Yeray Hidalgo Hernández	Las Palmas	3rd Runner-Up	
2018	Vicent Llorach	Valencia	Manhunt International 2018	Best Commercial Model
2016	Francisco Regadera	Girona	Top 16	
2012	Miguel Arce	Madrid	Unplaced	
2010	Antonio Million	Málaga	Unplaced	
2008	Victorio Alba	Alicante	Unplaced	
2006	Jose Mendez	Las Palmas	4th Runner-up	
1999	Enzo Di Piazza	Madrid	Unplaced	
1997	Agustin Ortega	Cantabria	Unplaced	
1994	Chris Aprikidis	Barcelona	Unplaced	

== See also ==
- RNB España
- Miss Spain
