= Mister World 2024 =

11th Mister World competition

- Date: 23 November 2024
- Presenters: Sandro Finoglio, Lương Thùy Linh
- Entertainment: Võ Lê Quế Anh
- Venue: NovaWorld Phan Thiết, Bình Thuận, Vietnam
- Entrants: 60
- Placements: 20
- Debuts: Guinea; Laos; Pakistan
- Withdrawals: Armenia; Austria; Bosnia and Herzegovina; Cameroon; Chile; Costa Rica; Curaçao; Equatorial Guinea; Estonia; Ghana; Greece; Honduras; Kazakhstan; Kyrgyzstan; Latvia; Luxembourg; Nigeria; Panama; Paraguay; Russia; Samoa; Sint Maarten; South Korea; Tonga
- Returns: Albania; Belgium; Bolivia; Botswana; Ethiopia; France; Jamaica; Turkey; Vietnam
- Winner: Daniel Mejía; Puerto Rico

Mister World 2024 was the eleventh edition of the Mister World competition, held at the NovaWorld Phan Thiết in Bình Thuận, Vietnam, on 23 November 2024.

Jack Heslewood of England crowned Daniel Mejía of Puerto Rico at the conclusion of the event.

== Background ==
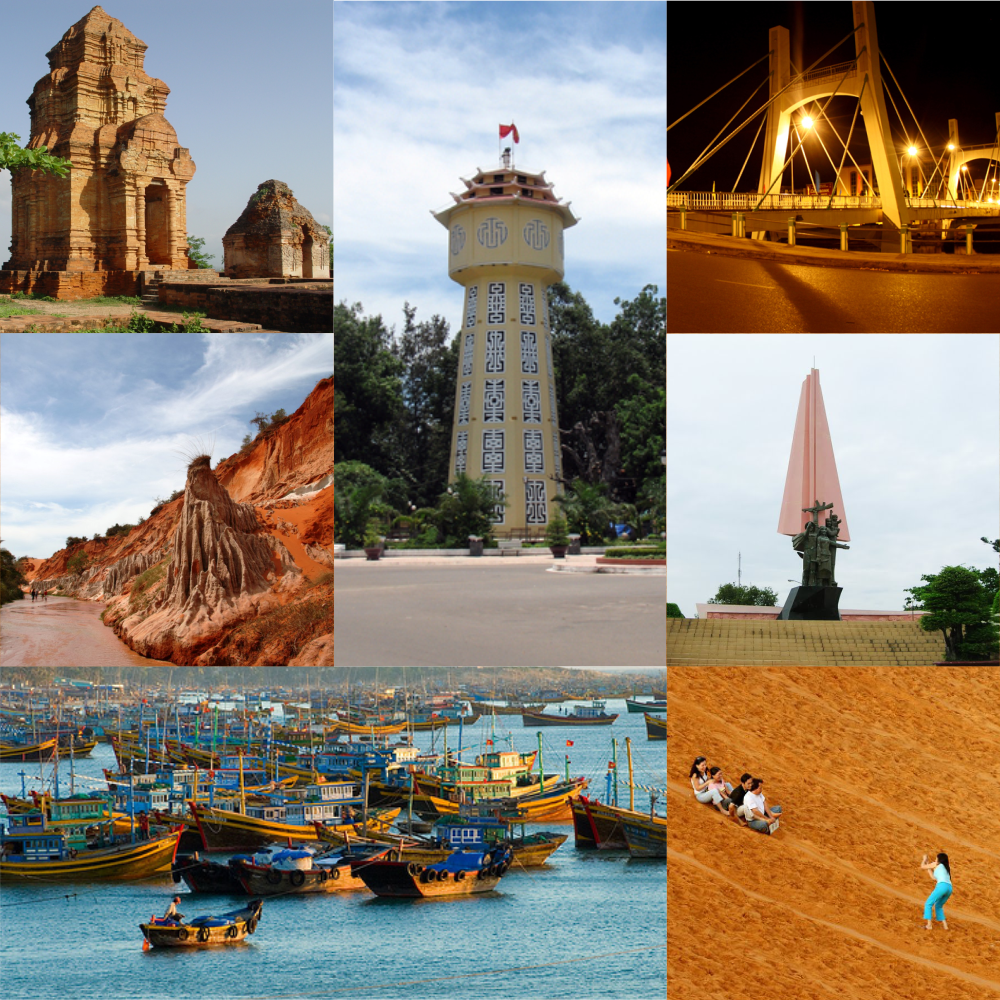
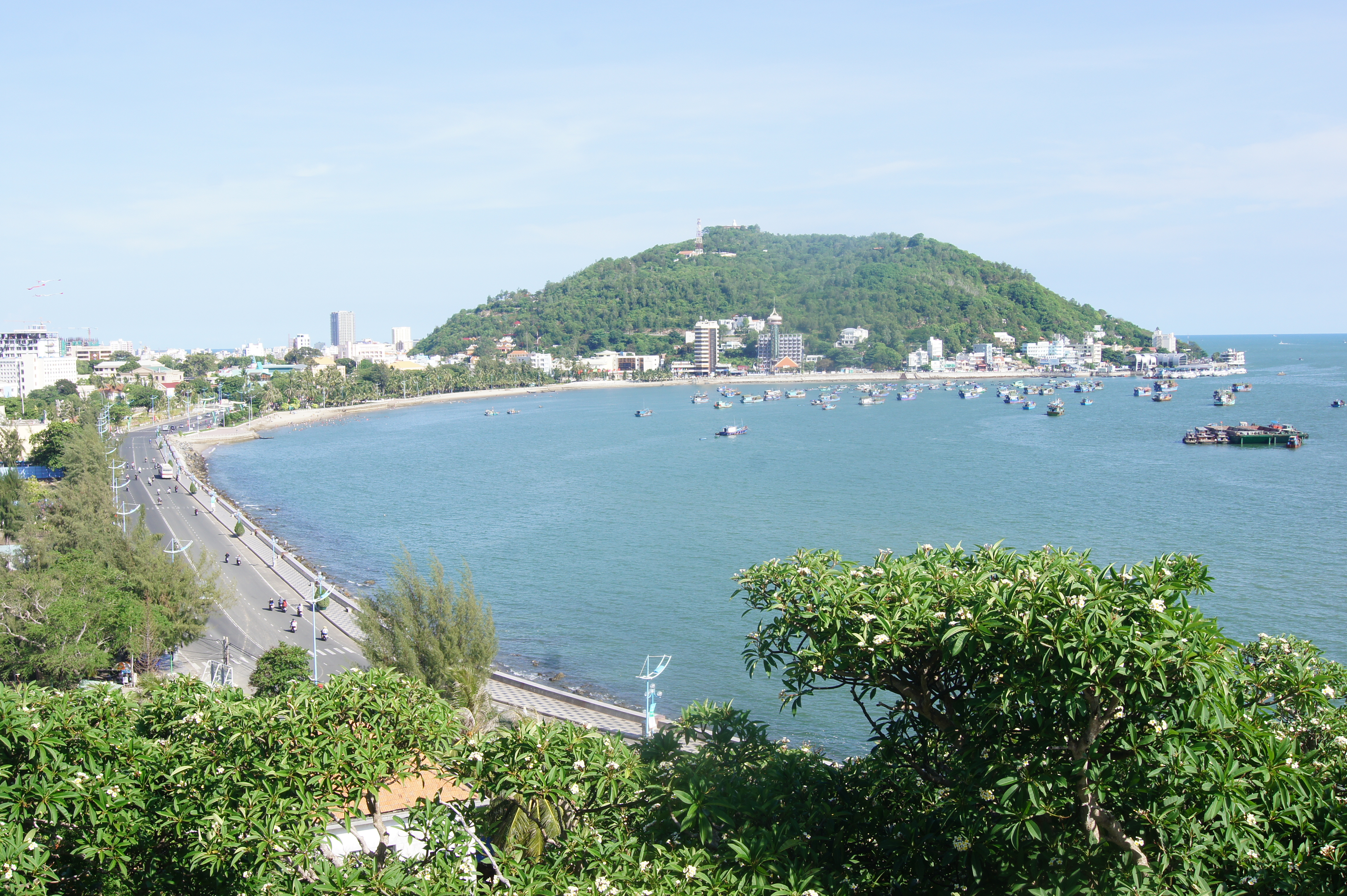

=== Location and date ===
On 17 March 2024, the organizer of the Mister World pageant, announced on their official social that the 11th edition of the contest was scheduled to be held in Vietnam in September 2024. This will be the first time for Vietnam to host the contest and the fourth time an Asian country has hosted the contest, after China in 2007, South Korea in 2010 and the Philippines in 2019. The memorandum of understanding signing ceremony between the Miss World organization and the local organizer Sen Vàng Entertainment, which also organizes the Mister World Vietnam competition, took place during the press conference of the inaugural edition of Mister World Vietnam contest at Vertical Garden Rex Hotel in Ho Chi Minh City on 22 June 2024. Attending this event were Mister World 2019 Jack Heslewood and Miss World 2023 Krystyna Pyszková.

The contest was originally scheduled to take place between September 12–28, but rescheduled to September 17 to October 5, and once again to November 5-23, due to the passing of Vietnam’s former president, Nguyễn Phú Trọng. The contestants will be going through many locations such as Phan Thiet City, Vung Tau City, and Nam Cat Tien National Park. This year, the contest will include several activities including pre-final challenge events, body art photo shoot session, and election of "Nam Cat Tien Green Environment Ambassador".

=== Selection of participants ===
This edition will feature the debuts of Guinea, Laos and Pakistan.

Out of a total of 60 contestants, 13 contestants are replacement representatives for the previously officially announced participants such as representatives from countries: Cambodia, Brazil, and India. Before the competition, twelve contestants withdrew from the competition: Cameroon, Chile, Costa Rica, Equatorial Guinea, Estonia, Ghana, Guinea-Bissau, Liberia, New Zealand, Nigeria, Panama and Uganda. Nine countries returned from a hiatus, including Botswana, which last competed in 1996, Jamaica in 1998, Albania in 2007, Ethiopia in 2010, Vietnam in 2012, Belgium and Turkey in 2014 and Bolivia and France in 2016.

== Results ==
=== Placements ===
Placement	Contestant
Mister World 2024	Puerto Rico – Daniel Mejía
1st Runner-Up	Vietnam – Phạm Tuấn Ngọc
2nd Runner-Up	Spain – Antonio Company
3rd Runner-Up	Angola – Salvatore Crisball
Top 10	Czech Republic – Tomas Haring; India – Gokul Ganesan; Kenya – Teddy Rossiter; Sri Lanka – Megha Sooriyaarachchi; Turkey – Ege Karabenli; Venezuela – Juan Alberto García
Top 20	Argentina – Tomas Ghigo; Belgium – Nathan de Schepper; Italy – Bruno Barbieri Roggiero; Lebanon – Mario El Hajj; Mexico – Alan Salazar; Myanmar – Sai Toung Law; Peru – Mickael Peña Olivieri; Philippines – Kirk Bondad; Sierra Leone – Alhaji Hassan Mansaray; United States – Daryn Friedman

=== Order of announcements ===
==== Top 20 ====
1. Puerto Rico
2. United States
3. Turkey
4. Italy
5. Myanmar
6. Peru
7. Belgium
8. Sierra Leone
9. Sri Lanka
10. Argentina
11. Mexico
12. Venezuela
13. Czech Republic
14. Spain
15. Angola
16. Kenya
17. India
18. Lebanon
19. Philippines
20. Vietnam

==== Top 10 ====
1. Puerto Rico
2. Venezuela
3. Czech Republic
4. Spain
5. Angola
6. Kenya
7. India
8. Turkey
9. Vietnam
10. Sri Lanka

==== Top 4 ====
1. Puerto Rico
2. Spain
3. Angola
4. Vietnam

=== Continental Zone Winners ===
Continent	Contestant
Africa	Angola – Salvatore Crisball
Americas	Venezuela – Juan Alberto García
Asia	Vietnam – Phạm Tuấn Ngọc
Caribbean	Jamaica – Tarique Barrett
Europe	Spain – Antonio Company
Oceania	Australia – Lochlan Carey

=== People's Choice Winners ===
People's Choice	Contestant
Africa	Sierra Leone – Alhaji Hassan Mansaray
Americas & Caribbean	Peru – Mickael Peña Olivieri
Asia & Oceania	Sri Lanka – Megha Sooriyaarachchi
Europe	Belgium – Nathan de Schepper

=== Fast Track Events ===
Event		Contestant
Sports Challenge		Puerto Rico – Daniel Mejía
Talent		Puerto Rico – Daniel Mejía
Multimedia		Italy – Bruno Barbieri Roggiero
Head-to-Head Challenge		United States – Daryn Friedman
Top Model		Turkey – Ege Karabenli
Beauty with a Purpose		Myanmar – Sai Toung Law
People's Choice		Sri Lanka – Megha Sooriyaarachchi
Best National Costume	People's Choice	Sri Lanka – Megha Sooriyaarachchi
Best National Costume	Judges' Choice	South Sudan – Amac Mathiang Ater Apugi

== Challenge Events ==
=== Head-to-Head Challenge ===
The challenge was held in multiple rounds. Twenty semifinalists were selected after the first round held on 11 November 2024 in which the contestants presented a self-introduction speech. In the second round held on 12 November 2024, the semifinalists were divided into 5 groups and had to present a speech about Vietnam tourism. The best semifinalist from each group was selected to become part of the five finalists who competed in the third round. Daryn Friedman from United States won the challenge, obtaining a placement in the Top 20.

==== Round 1 ====
- Advanced to Round 2 of the Head-to-Head Challenge.
- Advanced to Round 2 of the Head-to-Head Challenge, but advanced to the Top 20 via judges' choice or a challenge event other than Head-to-Head Challenge.
- Advanced to the Top 20 via a challenge event other than Head-to-Head Challenge.
- Advanced to the Top 20 via judges' choice.

Continental Group	Delegates			
Asia & Oceania	Australia	Bangladesh	Cambodia	China
Asia & Oceania	India	Indonesia	Japan	Laos
Asia & Oceania	Lebanon	Malaysia	Myanmar	Nepal
Asia & Oceania	~~New Zealand~~	Pakistan	Philippines	Singapore
Asia & Oceania	Sri Lanka	Thailand	Turkey	Vietnam
Africa	Angola	Botswana	Ethiopia	Guinea
Africa	Kenya	Mauritius	Sierra Leone	South Africa
Americas & Caribbean	Argentina	Bolivia	Brazil	Canada
Americas & Caribbean	Colombia	Dominican Republic	Ecuador	El Salvador
Americas & Caribbean	Guadeloupe	Jamaica	Mexico	Nicaragua
Americas & Caribbean	Puerto Rico	United States	Venezuela	—
Europe	Albania	Belgium	Bulgaria	Czech Republic
Europe	England	Finland	France	Ireland
Europe	Italy	Malta	Montenegro	Netherlands
Europe	Northern Ireland	Poland	Serbia	Spain

- Note: Peru and South Sudan weren't assigned for the Head-to-Head challenge.

==== Round 2 ====
- Advanced to Round 3 of the Head-to-Head Challenge.

Group	Country 1	Country 2	Country 3	Country 4
1	Puerto Rico	Argentina	Ireland	Vietnam
2	Italy	Czech Republic	El Salvador	Singapore
3	England	Guinea	Canada	India
4	Australia	Spain	Sierra Leone	Ethiopia
5	France	Indonesia	United States	Montenegro

==== Round 3 ====
- Advanced to the Top 20 via the Head-to-Head challenge.

Country 1	Country 2	Country 3	Country 4	Country 5
Puerto Rico	Czech Republic	Canada	Australia	United States

==== Overall ====
Placement	Contestant
Winner	United States – Daryn Friedman
1st Runner-up	Australia – Lochlan Carey
2nd Runner-up	Puerto Rico – Daniel Mejía
Top 5	Canada – Travis Edward; Czech Republic – Tomas Haring
Top 20	Argentina – Tomas Ghigo; El Salvador – Josue Molina; England – Manuel Alcantara-Turner; Ethiopia – Natnael Yazbec; France – Maxime Klinger; Guinea – Djibril Cissé; India – Gokul Ganesan; Indonesia – Nathanael Yoga; Ireland – Glenn Williamson; Italy – Bruno Barbieri; Montenegro – Vladimir Vukcevic; Sierra Leone – Alhaji Hassan Mansaray; Singapore – John Sathguru; Spain – Antonio Company; Vietnam – Phạm Tuấn Ngọc

=== Talent ===
The thirty-three semifinalists in the Talent Competition were announced via Mister World social media platforms on 9 November 2024. Three additional semifinalists were added during the final round held on 10 November 2024, where the five finalists were selected. Danny Mejia from Puerto Rico won the challenge, obtaining a placement in the Top 20.

- Advanced to the Top 20 via the Talent challenge.

Placement	Contestant
Winner	Puerto Rico – Daniel Mejía
Top 5	Canada – Travis Edward; Poland – Hubert Gromadzki; United States – Daryn Friedman; Vietnam – Phạm Tuấn Ngọc
Top 36	Albania – Algert Beraj; Angola – Salvatore Crisball; Botswana – Vincent Gobuamang; Cambodia – Sokhunrangsey Thul; Czech Republic – Tomas Haring; Ecuador – Antonio Borja; El Salvador – Josue Molina; Finland – Juuso Savolainen; France – Maxime Klinger; India – Gokul Ganesan; Indonesia – Nathanael Yoga; Italy – Bruno Barbieri; Jamaica – Tarique Barrett; Japan – Tomohiro Mitani; Kenya – Teddy Rossiter; Laos – Sithpaseuth Syinthavong; Mauritius – Govind Nagi; Mexico – Alan Salazar; Montenegro – Vladimir Vukcevic; Myanmar – Sai Toung Law; Nepal – Santosh Lokshum Limbu; Netherlands – Ahmed Haydar; ~~New Zealand – Tim Kiriwi~~; Nicaragua – Erlin Ayerdis; Pakistan – Usman Janjua; Philippines – Kirk Bondad; Sierra Leone – Alhaji Hassan Mansaray; South Africa – Samuel Chauke; Spain – Antonio Company; Sri Lanka – Megha Sooriyaarachchi; Thailand – Jeerawat Vatchasakol

=== Top Model Challenge ===
The Top Model challenge was held on 9 November 2024 at the Villa Blanche, a historical building located in Vung Tau City, in conjunction with the ninth edition of the Vietnam Beauty Fashion Fest with the theme "Oriental Flow". The contestants paraded in two outfits, one provided by Vietnamese designers and one prepared by the contestants themselves, before the twelve semifinalists were selected. Ege Karabenli from Turkey won the challenge, obtaining a placement in the Top 20.

- Advanced to the Top 20 via the Top Model challenge.

Final Result	Contestant
Winner	Turkey – Ege Karabenli
Top 5	India – Gokul Ganesan; Northern Ireland – James Moody; Philippines – Kirk Bondad; Spain – Antonio Company
Top 12	China – Wei Zihong; Colombia – Juan Esteban Rodriguez; Italy – Bruno Barbieri; Kenya – Teddy Rossiter; Mexico – Alan Salazar; Venezuela – Juan Alberto García; Vietnam – Phạm Tuấn Ngọc

=== Sports ===
The challenge was held in two parts, 50 meter freestyle swim and 5 kilometer run. The swimming round was held on 14 November 2024 while the running round was held in conjunction with the Strong Vietnam Marathon in Vung Tau City on 17 November 2024. Danny Mejia from Puerto Rico won the challenge, obtaining a placement in the Top 20.

- Advanced to the Top 20 via the Sports challenge.

==== Overall ====
Final result	Contestants
Winner	Puerto Rico – Daniel Mejía
1st runner-up	Philippines – Kirk Bondad
2nd runner-up	Italy – Bruno Barbiero
3rd runner-up	England – Manuel Alcantara-Turner
4th runner-up	Botswana – Vincent Gobuamang

==== Swimming Round ====
Placement	Contestant
Winner	Puerto Rico – Daniel Mejía
1st runner-up	Italy – Bruno Barbieri
2nd runner-up	Brazil – Eduardo Menezes
Top 20 (by placement order)	Spain – Antonio Company; Australia – Lochlan Carey; United States – Daryn Friedman; El Salvador – Josue Molina; Venezuela – Juan Alberto García; England – Manuel Alcantara-Turner; Czech Republic – Tomas Haring; France – Maxime Klinger; Finland – Juuso Savolainen; Montenegro – Vladimir Vukcevic; Philippines – Kirk Bondad; Northern Ireland – James Moody; Turkey – Ege Karabenli; Belgium – Nathan de Schepper; Mexico – Alan Salazar; Thailand – Jeerawat Vatchasakol; Dominican Republic – Julio Peña

==== Running Round ====
Placement	Contestant
Winner	Botswana – Vincent Gobuamang
1st runner-up	Philippines – Kirk Bondad
2nd runner-up	China – Wei Zihong
Top 20 (by placement order)	Mexico – Alan Salazar; Japan – Tomohiro Mitani; Puerto Rico – Danny Mejia; Finland – Juuso Savolainen; England – Manuel Alcantara-Turner; South Sudan – Amac Mathiang Ater Apugi; Kenya – Teddy Rossiter; Netherlands – Ahmed Haydar; Malta – Slaven Micallef; South Africa – Samuel Chauke; Mauritius – Govind Nagi; Italy – Bruno Barbieri; United States – Daryn Friedman; Indonesia – Nathanael Yoga; Spain – Antonio Company; Pakistan – Usman Janjua; Turkey – Ege Karabenli

=== Beauty With a Purpose ===
The thirty semifinalists in the Beauty With a Purpose were announced via Mister World social media platforms on 20 November 2024. Sai Toung Law from Myanmar won the challenge, obtaining a placement in the Top 20.

- Advanced to the Top 20 via the Beauty With a Purpose challenge.

Placement	Contestant
Winner	Myanmar – Sai Toung Law
Top 5	Dominican Republic – Julio Peña; South Africa – Samuel Chauke; Spain – Antonio Company; Vietnam – Phạm Tuấn Ngọc
Top 30	Australia – Lochlan Carey; Belgium – Nathan de Schepper; Botswana – Vincent Gobuamang; Brazil – Eduardo Menezes; Cambodia – Sokhunrangsey Thul; El Salvador – Josue Molina; England – Manuel Alcantara-Turner; France – Maxime Klinger; Guinea – Djibril Cissé; India – Gokul Ganesan; Indonesia – Nathanael Yoga; Ireland – Glenn Williamson; Italy – Bruno Barbieri; Jamaica – Tarique Barrett; Lebanon – Mario El Hajj; Malaysia – Joshua Benedict; Mexico – Alan Salazar; Montenegro – Vladimir Vukcevic; Nepal – Santosh Lokshum Limbu; Philippines – Kirk Bondad; Puerto Rico – Daniel Mejía; Sierra Leone – Alhaji Hassan Mansaray; South Sudan – Amac Mathiang Ater Apugi; Sri Lanka – Megha Sooriyaarachchi; Thailand – Jeerawat Vatchasakol

=== Multimedia Challenge ===
The seventeen semifinalists in the Multimedia Challenge were announced via Mister World social media platforms on 21 November 2024. Bruno Barbieri from Italy won the challenge, obtaining a placement in the Top 20.

- Advanced to the Top 20 via the Multimedia Challenge.

Placement	Contestant
Winner	Italy – Bruno Barbieri
Top 5	El Salvador – Josue Molina; India – Gokul Ganesan; Netherlands – Ahmed Haydar; Spain – Antonio Company
Top 17	Argentina – Tomas Ghigo; China – Wei Zihong; Czech Republic – Tomas Haring; France – Maxime Klinger; Indonesia – Nathanael Yoga; Kenya – Teddy Rossiter; Laos – Sithpaseuth Syinthavong; Malaysia – Joshua Benedict; Mexico – Alan Salazar; Puerto Rico – Daniel Mejía; South Africa – Samuel Chauke; Vietnam – Phạm Tuấn Ngọc

=== Mr People's Choice ===
- Advanced to the Top 10 via winning Round 2 (Winner Mr People's Choice).
- Advanced to the Top 20 via winning Round 1 (per continental group).

Continental Group	Winner
Africa	Sierra Leone – Alhaji Hassan Mansaray
Americas & Caribbean	Peru – Mickael Peña Olivieri
Asia & Oceania	Sri Lanka – Megha Sooriyaarachchi
Europe	Belgium – Nathan de Schepper

=== Best National Costume ===
Placement		Contestant
Winner	People's Choice	Sri Lanka – Megha Sooriyaarachchi
Winner	Judges' Choice	South Sudan – Amac Mathiang Ater Apugi
Top 20		Angola – Salvatore Crisball; Colombia – Juan Esteban Rodriguez; Czech Republic – Tomas Haring; Indonesia – Nathanael Yoga; Ireland – Glenn Williamson; Italy – Bruno Barbieri; Jamaica – Tarique Barrett; Kenya – Teddy Rossiter; Mexico – Alan Salazar; Netherlands – Ahmed Haydar; Nicaragua – Erlin Ayerdis; Philippines – Kirk Bondad; Poland – Hubert Gromadzki; Puerto Rico – Daniel Mejía; Sierra Leone – Alhaji Hassan Mansaray; South Africa – Samuel Chauke; Venezuela – Juan Alberto García; Vietnam – Phạm Tuấn Ngọc

== Contestants ==
60 contestants competed for the title.

Country/territory	Contestant	Age (Note: Ages at the time of the pageant)	Height	Hometown
Albania	Algert Beraj	30	1.87 m (6 ft 1 1/2 in)	Tirana
Angola	Salvatore Crisball	24	2.00 m (6 ft 6 1/2 in)	Luanda
Argentina	Tomas Ghigo	23	1.83 m (6 ft 0 in)	Buenos Aires
Australia	Lochlan Carey	25	1.84 m (6 ft 1/2 in)	Melbourne
Bangladesh	B Proshad Das	24	1.90 m (6 ft 3 in)	Dhaka
Belgium	Nathan de Schepper	21	1.89 m (6 ft 2 1/2 in)	Oudenaarde
Bolivia	Mario Chávez	25	1.90 m (6 ft 3 in)	Santa Cruz
Botswana	Vincent Gobuamang	22	1.63 m (5 ft 4 in)	Qabo
Brazil	Eduardo Menezes	19	1.85 m (6 ft 1 in)	Toledo
Bulgaria	Mihail Sitev	30	1.87 m (6 ft 1 1/2 in)	Plovdiv
Cambodia	Sokhunrangsey Thul	21	1.83 m (6 ft 0 in)	Kampot
Canada	Travis Edward	21	1.83 m (6 ft 0 in)	Halifax
China	Wei Zihong	24	1.88 m (6 ft 2 in)	Sichuan
Colombia	Juan Esteban Rodriguez	18	1.95 m (6 ft 5 in)	Santa Fe de Bogota
Czech Republic	Tomas Haring	30	1.90 m (6 ft 3 in)	Prague
Dominican Republic	Julio Peña	25	1.80 m (5 ft 11 in)	Santo Domingo
Ecuador	Antonio Borja	24	1.87 m (6 ft 1 1/2 in)	Guayaquil
El Salvador	Josue Molina	26	1.83 m (6 ft 0 in)	San Salvador
England	Manuel Alcantara-Turner	22	1.78 m (5 ft 10 in)	Windsor
Ethiopia	Natnael Yazbec	28	1.85 m (6 ft 1 in)	Dire Dawa
Finland	Juuso Savolainen	24	1.77 m (5 ft 9 1/2 in)	Helsinki
France	Maxime Klinger	24	1.83 m (6 ft 0 in)	Kembs
Guadeloupe	Melvin Bartan	21	1.84 m (6 ft 1/2 in)	Basse-Terre
Guinea	Djibril Cissé	28	1.91 m (6 ft 3 in)	Conakry
India	Gokul Ganesan	24	1.91 m (6 ft 3 in)	Chennai
Indonesia	Nathanael Yoga	21	1.84 m (6 ft 1/2 in)	Jakarta
Ireland	Glenn Williamson	28	1.90 m (6 ft 3 in)	Togher
Italy	Bruno Barbieri	30	1.84 m (6 ft 1/2 in)	Rome
Jamaica	Tarique Barrett	22	1.82 m (5 ft 11 1/2 in)	Kingston
Japan	Tomohiro Mitani	23	1.81 m (5 ft 11 1/2 in)	Minato
Kenya	Teddy Rossiter	30	1.88 m (6 ft 2 in)	Nairobi
Laos	Sithpaseuth Syinthavong	22	1.82 m (5 ft 11 1/2 in)	Vientiane
Lebanon	Mario El Hajj	25	1.85 m (6 ft 1 in)	Beirut
Malaysia	Joshua Benedict	30	1.84 m (6 ft 1/2 in)	Johor Bahru
Malta	Slaven Micallef	27	1.78 m (5 ft 10 in)	Naxxar
Mauritius	Govind Nagi	25	1.88 m (6 ft 2 in)	Moka
Mexico	Alan Salazar	24	1.87 m (6 ft 1 1/2 in)	Mexico City
Montenegro	Vladimir Vukcevic	20	1.94 m (6 ft 4 1/2 in)	Podgorica
Myanmar	Sai Toung Law	26	1.69 m (5 ft 6 1/2 in)	Shan State
Nepal	Santosh Lokshum Limbu	20	1.78 m (5 ft 10 in)	Jhapa
Netherlands	Ahmed Haydar	19	1.82 m (5 ft 11 1/2 in)	Amsterdam
Nicaragua	Erlin Ayerdis	24	1.81 m (5 ft 11 1/2 in)	Managua
Northern Ireland	James Moody	18	1.93 m (6 ft 4 in)	Belfast
Pakistan	Usman Janjua	24	1.89 m (6 ft 2 1/2 in)	Lahore
Peru	Mickael Peña Olivieri	24	1.91 m (6 ft 3 in)	Cusco
Philippines	Kirk Bondad	27	1.90 m (6 ft 3 in)	Baguio
Poland	Hubert Gromadzki	27	1.86 m (6 ft 1 in)	Warsaw
Puerto Rico	Daniel Mejía	27	1.88 m (6 ft 2 in)	San Juan
Serbia	Filip Bakic	21	1.85 m (6 ft 1 in)	Belgrade
Sierra Leone	Alhaji Hassan Mansaray	26	1.88 m (6 ft 2 in)	Kamabai
Singapore	John Sathguru	29	1.86 m (6 ft 1 in)	Singapore
South Africa	Samuel Chauke	30	1.80 m (5 ft 11 in)	Potchefstroom
South Sudan	Amac Mathiang Ater Apugi	21	1.92 m (6 ft 3 1/2 in)	Juba
Spain	Antonio Company	26	1.89 m (6 ft 2 1/2 in)	Palma de Mallorca
Sri Lanka	Megha Sooriyaarachchi	28	1.78 m (5 ft 10 in)	Kandy
Thailand	Jeerawat Vatchasakol	28	1.81 m (5 ft 11 1/2 in)	Chiang Rai
Turkey	Ege Karabenli	26	1.90 m (6 ft 3 in)	Kuşadası
United States	Daryn Friedman	25	1.83 m (6 ft 0 in)	Hollywood
Venezuela	Juan Alberto García	25	1.88 m (6 ft 2 in)	Valencia
Vietnam	Phạm Tuấn Ngọc	25	1.84 m (6 ft 1/2 in)	Haiphong

== Notes ==
=== Debuts ===
- Guinea
- Laos
- Pakistan

=== Returns ===
- Last competed in 1996:
  - Botswana
- Last competed in 1998:
  - Jamaica
- Last competed in 2007:
  - Albania
- Last competed in 2010:
  - Ethiopia
- Last competed in 2012:
  - Vietnam
- Last competed in 2014:
  - Belgium
  - Turkey
- Last competed in 2016:
  - Bolivia
  - France

=== Replacement ===
- Argentina – Franco Luciano Touceda replaced by Tomas Ghigo
- Brazil – Vilmar Bertolino replaced by Eduardo Menezes
- Cambodia – Oliver Sara and Chomreoun Sovananreach replaced by Sokhunrangsey Thul
- Czech Republic – Zbyněk Vlček replaced by Tomas Haring
- England – Liam Royce Ulla replaced by Manuel Alcantara-Turner
- India – Jitesh Singh Deo replaced by Gokul Ganesan
- Kenya – Franklyne Herbert Asoyo replaced by Teddy Rossiter
- Malta – Alex Borg replaced by Slaven Micallef
- Nepal – Nutan Shrestha replaced by Santosh Lokshum Limbu
- Nicaragua – Hanniel Espinoza replaced by Erlin Ayerdis
- Peru – Victor Soto replaced by Mickael Peña Olivieri
- Singapore – Joshua Moses replaced by John Sathguru
- South Africa – Sean van Noordwyk replaced by Samuel Chauke

=== Withdraws ===
==== Before the competition ====
- Armenia
- Austria
- Bosnia and Herzegovina
- Curaçao
- Greece
- Honduras
- Kazakhstan
- Kyrgyzstan
- Latvia
- Luxembourg
- Paraguay
- Russia
- Samoa
- Sint Maarten
- South Korea
- Tonga

==== During the competition ====
- Cameroon – Hendrix Allan Moth
- Chile – Jorge Aldoney
- Costa Rica – José Roberto Mena Araya
- Equatorial Guinea – Abraham Mauvé
- Estonia – Janno Talumaa
- Ghana – Richard Ouro-Tagba Kofi
- Guinea-Bissau – Gabriel Monteiro
- Liberia – Bruce Irwin Schuler
- New Zealand – Tim Kiriwi
- Nigeria – Michael Mazi-Michael
- Panama – Aaron Guerra
- Uganda – Shaun Micheal Alinda
