= José Luis Reséndez =

Mexican actor and model

- Born: José Luis Reséndez Santos; October 14, 1978 (age 47); Monterrey, Nuevo León, Mexico
- Other name: Joe Reséndez
- Occupations: Actor and model
- Height: 1.86 m (6 ft 1 in)
- Title: El Modelo México 2003

José Luis Reséndez Santos (born October 14, 1978) is a Mexican actor and model. He represented Mexico in Mister World 2003 contest, held in London, England, where he finished in the Top 5.

== Career ==
Reséndez entered the entertainment industry through modeling after winning El Modelo México and placing as third runner-up in the Mister World 2003 competition held in London, England. This success transitioned him into acting, where he debuted in Televisa productions without initially aspiring to a career in telenovelas.

Reséndez appeared in 22 telenovelas, gaining prominence for roles such as Greco Montes in La madrastra (2005), Fabricio Beltrán Campuzano in Heridas de amor (2006), and leading parts in Destilando amor (2007) and Tormenta en el paraíso (2007). He later joined Telemundo in 2011, starring in series like Flor salvaje and Corazón valiente, before achieving one of his most recognized characters as the antagonist "Teca" in Señora Acero (2014).

In 2018, he announced his retirement from television as a protest against perceived labor abuses and exploitation in the industry, particularly following his abrupt departure from Señora Acero. Since then, he has focused on entrepreneurship, including leadership in a natural products company and marketing endeavors, while maintaining a private life as a father of two daughters.

Awards and achievements
Preceded by (The Bahamas) Neil Paris Dames	Mister World 3rd Place; 2003	Succeeded by (Costa Rica) Alonso Fernández Alvarez
Preceded by Guido Quiles	El Modelo México; 2003	Succeeded by Jorge Aceves
