= Frankie Cena =

Canadian television presenter, musician and debate coach (born 1991)

- Born: September 11, 1991 (age 35); Burnaby, British Columbia, Canada
- Education: University of British Columbia
- Occupation: Former pageant winner
- Height: 1.68 m (5 ft 6 in)
- Beauty pageant titleholder
- Title: Mr. World Canada 2012
- Years active: 2012-present
- Hair colour: Brown
- Eye colour: Brown
- Major competitions: Mr. World Canada 2012 (Winner); Mister World 2012 (Top 5)
- Website: frankiecena.com

Francesco "Frankie" Anthony Cena is a Canadian television presenter, musician and debate coach. He was born in Burnaby, British Columbia, Canada. He is known for being Mister World Canada in 2012, competing at Mister World that same year, and for later co-hosting multiple Mr. World and Miss World competitions.

== Early & Personal life ==
Cena, born 1991, graduated from the University of British Columbia in 2013. He is an openly gay man.

== Career ==
=== Mister World and Miss World ===
Cena was selected to represent Canada at the Mister World beauty pageant in 2012, held in Torbay, England. Cena then hosted the 2014 edition of Mister World, interviewing contestants, judging the talent portion of the competition, and presenting at the finale. Cena also worked as the Web Presenter for Miss World beauty pageant in 2014, conducting interviews and creating video coverage of the event featured on the Miss World website. He was frequently seen at events with Tara Teng, Miss World Canada 2012.

Cena was a co-host of the Miss World pageant in 2014, 2015, 2017, and 2018. He also co-hosted Mr. World 2014 and 2016. And he was in charge of the "Head to Head Challenge" during Miss World Canada 2020.

=== Music ===
Cena's first performances were with the British Columbia Boys Choir at the age of nine, with whom he performed for Queen Elizabeth II at her 50th Jubilee. In 2012, Cena made it to the televised rounds of the final season of Canadian Idol, and he continues to post covers of popular songs and music videos on his YouTube channel and to perform at various concerts. Cena was featured as one of the contestants in the Netflix reality show Sing On!, and he won $40,400.

=== Debate ===
Following his own student debating career, Cena became coach of his former high school in 2012, winning regional and international championships. He went on to become coach of the Danish National Debate Team and, in 2016, founded Fostering Debate Talent (FDT) Academy, a private debate academy based in Vancouver, British Columbia, Canada.

== See also ==
- Mister World
- Miss World
- Mister World 2012
- Mister World Canada
