= Juan García Postigo =

Spanish actor, model, and male beauty pageant winner

- Born: 19 January 1982 (age 44); Málaga, Spain
- Education: Degree in Business Management; Certified Hotelier; Licensed Sommelier
- Alma mater: University of Málaga; Escuela de Cocina de Barcelona; Colegio Público Ramón Simonet
- Occupations: Actor; model; sommelier; hotelier; entrepreneur
- Height: 191 cm (6 ft 3 in)
- Beauty pageant titleholder
- Title: Mister Spain 2006; Mister World 2007
- Hair color: Dark Brown
- Eye color: Light Blue
- Major competitions: Mister Spain 2006 (Winner); Mister World 2007 (Winner)

Juan García Postigo (born 19 January 1982) is a Spanish actor, model, sommelier, hotelier, entrepreneur, and male beauty pageant titleholder who won the Mister Spain 2006 competition, and then later on won the Mister World 2007 title in Sanya, Hainan, China. He is the first Spaniard to have won the title of Mister World.

As an actor, García is best known for his roles in the television shows Los Serrano (2003), ¡A ver si llego! (2009), and La hora de José Mota (2009).

== Biography ==
=== Early life and education ===
García was born on 19 January 1982 in Málaga, Costa del Sol, Andalusia, Spain. He attended the Colegio Público Ramón Simonet for his primary education. As a teenager, García played indoor soccer and was his school team's goalkeeper. He was discovered at seventeen (17) years old by Manuel Beltrán, a director of a talent management agency in Málaga, while García was commencing studies for a business management degree at the University of Málaga.

His foray into modeling and beauty pageant competitions, and then consequently acting, was accidental and with much hesitation at first. García's parents, especially his mother, wanted him to pursue and complete his degree before anything else. His parents did not want him to get distracted from his studies.

=== Career and business ventures ===
As a lover of wine, García is also a licensed sommelier with professional training from the Escuela de Cocina de Barcelona, and official certification from the Federación de Asociaciones de Bármanes Españoles (FABE).

As an entrepreneur and hotelier, García is one of three founding partners of the Hotel Málaga Premium. He is co-owner of La Terraza Oasis de Málaga, a terrace bar, and of the Alcazaba Premium Hostel Málaga.

== Pageantry ==
García first trained as a model under a talent management agency in Madrid. A few months after training, he was already walking the runways of several Spanish fashion designers and gracing the catalogs of popular menswear brands in Spain. García's decision to enter pageantry was, at first, made in jest.

=== Mister Spain 2006 ===
While García was working at his brother's bar in Torremolinos, one of his friends dared him to enter the Mister Málaga 2006 competition, a precursory contest that chooses the Málagan representative to the Mister Spain competition. He disclosed in later interviews that the decision to compete at Mister Málaga and then Mister Spain 2006 was "just for fun... to have a good time," and that he did not expect to win both competitions.

=== Mister World 2007 ===
After winning the Míster España title, García represented Spain at the Mister World 2007 competition in Sanya, Hainan, China.

During the preliminaries, García and the other Mister World delegates competed in a number of events, including the sports and extreme challenge competitions where they had to hike and climb a mountain on Hainan island, as well as practice kung fu and tai chi. For the talent competition, García, a licensed sommelier, opted to demonstrate the wine decantation process.

On 31 March 2007, at the finals held in Sanya City, China, García was declared Mister World 2007, besting 57 other contestants.

García reigned until 27 March 2010, his title passing to Mister World 2010 Kamal Ibrahim of Ireland. García is the first and only Spanish Mister World winner, thus far.

As a former Mister World, García was a judge at the Mister World 2012 competition held in Kent, England.

== Views on cosmetic surgery ==
When asked if he had anything done on his face, Garcia said in an interview that although he has nothing against cosmetic surgery, he has done no aesthetic surgery to enhance his appearance, and that the only surgical procedure he has ever had is an appendectomy, as he once suffered from acute appendicitis.

== Filmography ==
=== Television ===
Year	Title	Network	Notes
2003	Los Serrano	Telecinco	
2007	El Intermedio	LaSexta	
2007	Las mañanas de Cuatro	Cuatro	
2009	¡A ver si llego!	Telecinco	
2009	La hora de José Mota	TVE; Hill Valley	
2010	¡Mira quién baila!	Univision; Las Estrellas	
2010	Pasapalabra	Telecinco	
2012	Mister World 2012		Judge

Awards and achievements
Preceded by (Brazil) Gustavo Gianetti	Mister World; 2007	Succeeded by (Republic of Ireland) Kamal Ibrahim
Preceded by Borja Alonso	Mister Spain; 2006	Succeeded by Luis Muñoz
