= Nebojša Malešević =

Bosnian Serb fashion model (born 1983)

Nebojša Malešević (Небојша Малешевић) (born May 29, 1983, in Banja Luka, SR Bosnia and Herzegovina, SFR Yugoslavia) is a Bosnian Serb fashion model.

He is a leading male fashion model in his country, appearing at Fashion Week catwalk shows in Sarajevo and Banja Luka. In March 2007, Nebojša represented Bosnia and Herzegovina at the Mister World 2007 contest in China.

Until recently, he also presented TV entertainment programmes for Republika Srpska television station Alternativna.

Nebojša is also a national sportsman, having represented his country at basketball.

He lives and works in Banja Luka, where he attends the city University studying architecture.
