= Mister World 2012 =

7th Mister World competition, male beauty pageant edition

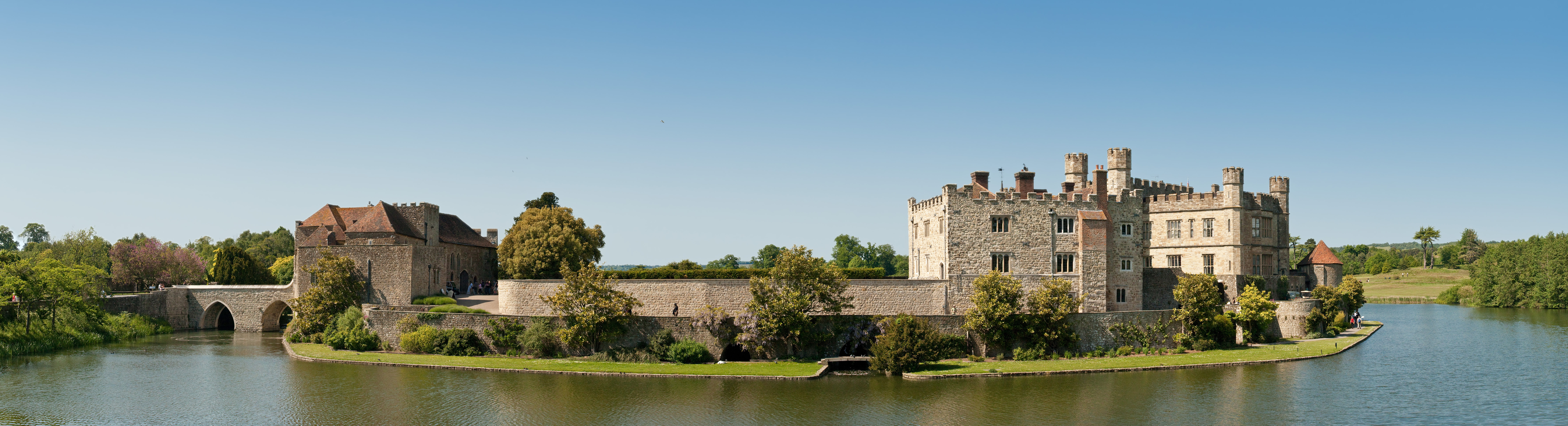
- Kent, host city for Mister World 2012
- Date: November 24, 2012
- Presenters: Myleene Klass; Kamal Ibrahim
- Venue: Kent County Showground, Kent, England, United Kingdom
- Entrants: 48
- Placements: 10
- Debuts: Macau
- Withdrawals: Angola; Australia; Azerbaijan; Bahamas; Belarus; Cyprus; Denmark; Dominican Republic; Egypt; Ethiopia; Georgia; Guyana; Hong Kong; Indonesia; Kazakhstan; Kenya; Macedonia FYRO; Malaysia; Montenegro; Nigeria; Norway; Panama; Romania; South Korea; Serbia; Sri Lanka; Swaziland; Sweden; Thailand; United States
- Returns: Argentina; Portugal; Vietnam
- Winner: Francisco Escobar; Colombia

Mister World 2012 was the 7th edition of the Mister World competition. It was held at the Kent County Showground, Kent, England, on November 24, 2012. Kamal Ibrahim of Ireland crowned Francisco Escobar of Colombia at the end of the event.

== Results ==
=== Placements ===
Placement	Contestant
Mister World 2012	Colombia – Francisco Escobar
1st Runner-Up	Philippines – Andrew Wolff
2nd Runner-Up	Ireland – Leo Delaney
Top 10	Belgium – Gianni Sennesael; Canada – Francesco Cena; Croatia – Vanja Grgeć; England – Roland Johnson; Lebanon – Rodolphe Nader; Peru – Rodrigo Fernandini; Vietnam – Trương Nam Thành

Order of Announcements

Top 10

1. Vietnam
2. Philippines
3. Canada
4. Ireland
5. Croatia
6. Peru
7. Belgium
8. Colombia
9. England
10. Lebanon

Top 3

1. Ireland
2. Colombia
3. Philippines

=== Challenge Events ===
- Extreme is a test of strength, endurance, and determination
- Sports is a test of skill, discipline, and athleticism
- Talent & Creativity focuses on the contestants' performing arts presentation, technique, and dedication
- Fashion looks at the contestants' runway skills, style and bearing, and overall fashion sense
- Multimedia looks at contestants' interaction with the online audience mainly on different social media platforms

=== Fast Track Events ===
Final results	Country	Contestant
Sports Challenge	Ireland	Leo Delaney
Extreme Challenge	Croatia	Vanja Grgeć
Talent & Creativity	Canada	Francesco Cena
Fashion & Style	Vietnam	Trương Nam Thành
Multimedia Challenge	Philippines	Andrew Wolff

=== Sports ===
The Sports Challenge was held on 5 separate days with 5 different sporting events. The 5 events were fitness test on November 13, golf test on November 15, swimming test on November 17, penalty shoot-out test on November 18, and sprint test on November 22.

Final results	Contestant
Winner	Ireland – Leo Delaney
Top 12	Colombia – Francisco Escobar; Croatia – Vanja Grgeć; Honduras – Kilber Ponce; Japan – Shuhei Arai; Martinique – David Fortune; Mexico – Enrique Mayagoitia; Philippines – Andrew Wolff; Poland – Krystian Kurowski; Portugal – Paulo Jórge Soares; Puerto Rico – Alberto López; Wales – Rhodri Ihenacho

=== Talent & Creativity ===
The Talent Challenge was held along with the Final on November 24.

Final results	Contestant
Winner	Canada – Francesco Cena
Top 10	Bolivia – Kristoff Baez; China – Tan Zeyong; Czech Republic – Milan Nevosad; England – Roland Johnson; Mongolia – Enkhbold Erdenetuya; Netherlands – Bas Gosewisch; Venezuela – Jesús Zambrano; Vietnam – Trương Nam Thành; Wales – Rhodri Ihenacho
Top 15	Colombia – Francisco Escobar; Croatia – Vanja Grgeć; New Zealand – Courtenay Bernard; Russia – Kirill Bondarenko; Singapore – Edison Ho Jian Yang

=== Multimedia Challenge ===
The Multimedia Challenge was held on November 18 at the city of Canterbury.

Final results	Contestant
Winner	Philippines – Andrew Wolff
Top 5	Belgium – Gianni Sennesael; Canada – Francesco Cena; Colombia – Francisco Escobar; Netherlands – Bas Gosewisch

=== Extreme Challenge ===
The Extreme Sports Challenge was held on November 16.

Final results	Contestant
Winner	Croatia – Vanja Grgeć
1st Runner-Up	Colombia – Francisco Escobar
Top 15	Belgium – Gianni Sennesael; China – Tan Zeyong; Costa Rica – Jorge Castillo; Latvia – Kaspars Romanovs; Macau – Kim Wu Ngai Kin; Mexico – Enrique Mayagoitia; Netherlands – Bas Gosewisch; Paraguay – Miguel Cardozo; Philippines – Andrew Wolff; Poland – Krystian Kurowski; Portugal – Paulo Jórge Soares; Puerto Rico – Alberto López; Turkey – Barış Aslan

=== Fashion & Style ===
The Fashion & Style Challenge was held along with the Final on November 24.

Final results	Contestant
Winner	Vietnam – Trương Nam Thành

== Music ==
- Sweat (Snoop Dogg ft David Guetta) – Denim Dance
- One Vision (Queen) – Fashion & Style Challenge
- Your Song (Elton John) – Live performance by Jonathan and Charlotte
- Call Me Maybe (Carly Rae Jepsen) – Coronation Moment

== Contestants ==
48 contestants competed for the title

Country/Territory	Contestant	Age	Height	Hometown
Argentina	Franco Belotti	26	1.86 m (6 ft 1 in)	Buenos Aires
Belgium	Gianni Sennesael	22	1.91 m (6 ft 3 in)	Diksmuide
Bolivia	Kristoff Baez	22	1.86 m (6 ft 1 in)	Santa Cruz
Bosnia and Herzegovina	Zlatan Duratović	22	1.84 m (6 ft 1/2 in)	Sarajevo
Brazil	William Rech	25	1.80 m (5 ft 11 in)	Novo Hamburgo
Bulgaria	Stefan Miletiev	23	1.80 m (5 ft 11 in)	Sofia
Canada	Francesco Cena	21	1.65 m (5 ft 5 in)	Vancouver
China	Tan Zeyong	23	1.88 m (6 ft 2 in)	Hunan
Colombia	Francisco Escobar	21	1.90 m (6 ft 3 in)	Cali
Costa Rica	Jorge astillo	23	1.84 m (6 ft 1/2 in)	San Ramon
Croatia	Vanja Grgeć	25	1.87 m (6 ft 1 1/2 in)	Zagreb
Czech Republic	Milan Nevosad	20	1.91 m (6 ft 3 in)	Mladá Boleslav
England	Roland Johnson	20	1.90 m (6 ft 3 in)	Surrey
France	Alexandre Cheraibi	24	1.88 m (6 ft 2 in)	Soissons
Germany	Alessandro Izzo	21	1.84 m (6 ft 1/2 in)	Hockenheim
Greece	Dimitris Valvis	27	1.88 m (6 ft 2 in)	Syros
Guadeloupe	Wendy Villeronce	22	1.88 m (6 ft 2 in)	Basse-Terre
Honduras	Kilber Ponce	23	1.80 m (5 ft 11 in)	San Pedro Sula
India	Taher Ali	25	1.85 m (6 ft 1 in)	Mumbai
Ireland	Leo Delaney	20	1.85 m (6 ft 1 in)	Limerick
Italy	Fabio Rondinelli	27	1.90 m (6 ft 3 in)	Settingiano
Japan	Shuhei Arai	27	1.83 m (6 ft 0 in)	Nara
Latvia	Kaspars Romanovs	27	1.90 m (6 ft 3 in)	Balvi
Lebanon	Rodolphe Nader	20	1.85 m (6 ft 1 in)	Beirut
Luxembourg	Kevin Stamerra	25	1.90 m (6 ft 3 in)	Esch-Sur-Alzette
Macau	Kim Wu Ngai Kin	24	1.78 m (5 ft 10 in)	Macau
Malta	Robert Galea	25	1.85 m (6 ft 1 in)	Rabat
Martinique	David Fortune	23	1.88 m (6 ft 2 in)	Fort-de-France
Mexico	Enrique Mayagoitia	26	1.90 m (6 ft 3 in)	Monterrey
Mongolia	Enkhbold Erdenetuya	25	1.88 m (6 ft 2 in)	Ulaanbaatar
Netherlands	Bas Gosewisch	22	1.88 m (6 ft 2 in)	Overijssel
New Zealand	Courtenay Bernard	27	1.84 m (6 ft 1/2 in)	West Auckland
Northern Ireland	Michael McCann	24	1.80 m (5 ft 11 in)	Belfast
Paraguay	Miguel Cardozo	25	1.86 m (6 ft 1 in)	Asunción
Peru	Rodrigo Fernandini	21	1.80 m (5 ft 11 in)	Lambayeque
Philippines	Andrew Wolff	27	1.89 m (6 ft 2 1/2 in)	Manila
Poland	Krystian Kurowski	27	1.87 m (6 ft 1 1/2 in)	Wrocław
Portugal	Paulo Jórge Soares	21	1.86 m (6 ft 1 in)	Lisbon
Puerto Rico	Alberto López	23	1.78 m (5 ft 10 in)	San Juan
Russia	Kirill Bondarenko	27	1.89 m (6 ft 2 1/2 in)	Vladivostok
Singapore	Edison Ho Jian Yang	26	1.75 m (5 ft 9 in)	Yishun
South Africa	Andrew Govender	25	1.83 m (6 ft 0 in)	Johannesburg
Spain	Alvaro Villanueva	21	1.89 m (6 ft 2 1/2 in)	Seville
Turkey	Barış Aslan	22	1.88 m (6 ft 2 in)	Istanbul
Ukraine	Oleksandr Bogdanov	26	1.78 m (5 ft 10 in)	Kyiv
Venezuela	Jesús Zambrano	22	1.89 m (6 ft 2 1/2 in)	Táchira
Vietnam	Trương Nam Thành	21	1.83 m (6 ft 0 in)	Ho Chi Minh City
Wales	Rhodri Ihenacho	19	1.84 m (6 ft 1/2 in)	Swansea

== Notes ==
=== Debuts ===
- Macau China

=== Returns ===
Last competed in 1998:

- Portugal

Last competed in 2000:

- Argentina

Last competed in 2007:

- Vietnam

=== Crossovers ===
Manhunt International

- 2011: Belgium – Gianni Sennesael (2nd runner-up)
- 2011: Vietnam – Trương Nam Thành (3rd runner-up)
- 2011: England – Roland Johnson (Top 15)

Men Universe Model

- 2013: Belgium – Gianni Sennesael (1st runner-up)
- 2013: Honduras – Kilber Benjamin Gutiérrez Ponce

Mister International

- 2013: Belgium – Gianni Sennesael
- 2013: People's Republic of China – Tan Zeyong (Top 10)
- 2013: Peru – Rodrigo Fernandini Chu

Mister Tourism International

- 2013: Honduras – Kilber Benjamin Gutiérrez Ponce

== Historical significance ==
- Canada, Colombia, England, Peru, Philippines, and Vietnam placed for the first time.
- Colombia won the first title.
- Ireland and Lebanon last placed in the last Mister World 2010.
- Belgium last placed in 2003.
- Croatia last placed in 2000.
- Lebanon placed for 5th consecutive times since 2000.
- This is the first time since 2003 where there are only 10 finalists announced on the Final.
