= Francisco Escobar =

Colombian model, Mister World 2012

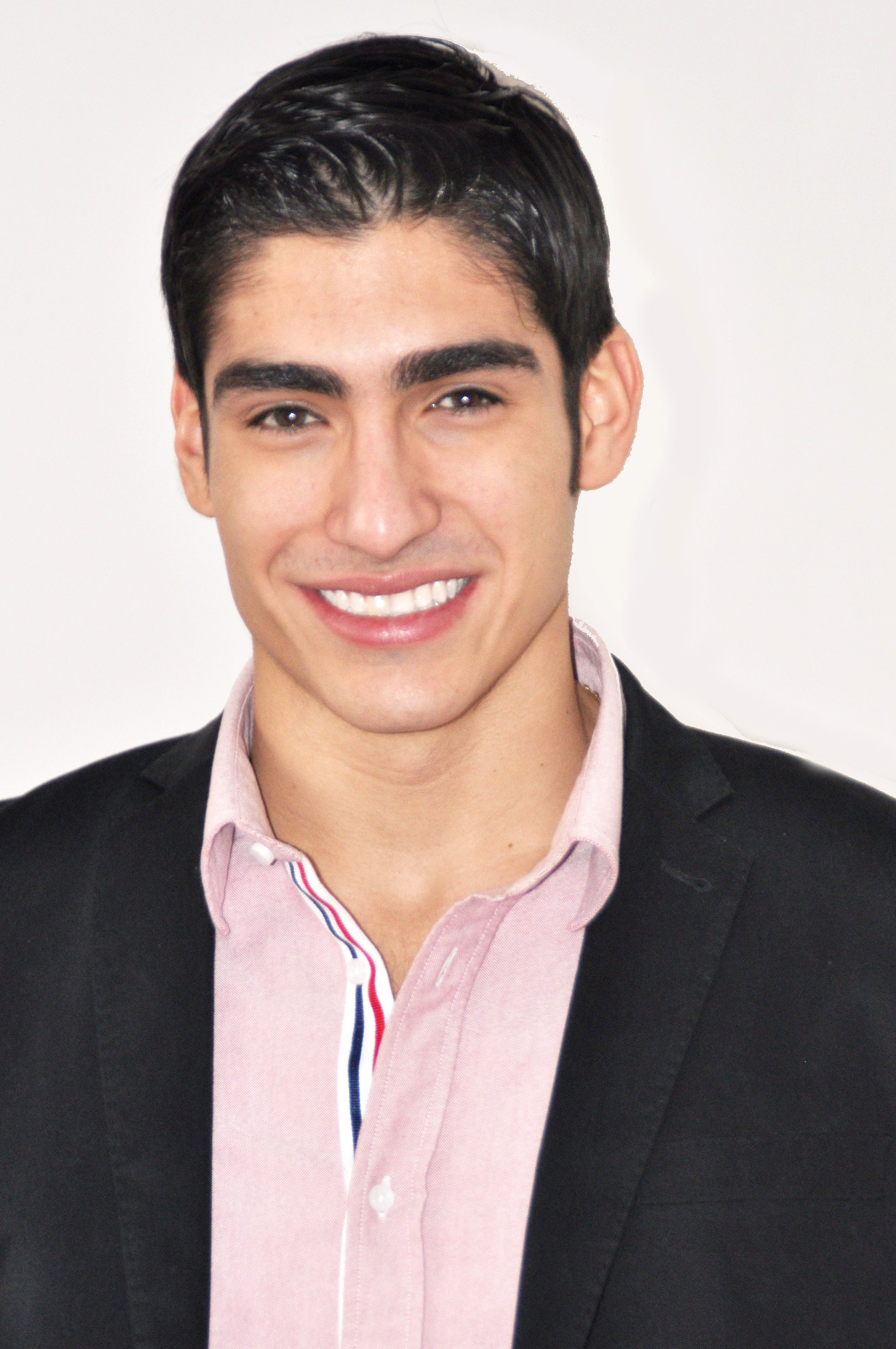
- Francisco Javier Escobar
- Born: Francisco Javier Escobar Parra; June 21, 1991 (age 35); Cali, Colombia
- Occupation: Model
- Height: 190 cm (6 ft 3 in)
- Beauty pageant titleholder
- Title: Mister Colombia 2012; Mister World 2012
- Agency: Portfolio International (Col)

Francisco Javier Escobar Parra (June 21, 1991) is a Colombian model and the winner of the Mister World 2012 title which was held in Kent, England on November 24, 2012. He defeated 47 other challengers from around the world to earn the Mister World 2013 title. Francisco studied Business Administration at Monroe College in New York, and is a pole vaulter.

Francisco is professional model based in New York City. He has been in many different magazines, such as Vogue, cosmopolitan, W and many more. He has been in more than 20 countries traveling as a model and doing his sport. Francisco Escobar has been in Vogue magazine four times with Bruce Weber, who is recognized as one of the best photographers in the world.

== Modeling ==
Francisco has been modeling for more than five years. His career started by modelling. First in Singapore where he built his book. He also travelled to China, Hong Kong, and Malaysia. After being in Asia for a year, Francisco decided to try his luck in New York. He was booked with an unknown agency and few days later he modeled for and featured for Calvin Klein. Francisco participated in New York Fashion Week a couple of times. He is currently signed with The Society Management.

== Pageantry ==
Francisco was one of 48 contestants from around the world competing at the seventh edition of the Mr World competition. The competition consisted of a series of challenges, culminating in the Grand Final at the Kent Event Centre, Kent, UK. Although not winning any of the challenges, he placed high in four of the five, attaining second place in the Extreme Sports Challenge and a top five placement in the Multi-Media Award. Francisco was chosen as the winner at the final and named "The World's Most Desirable Man".

As Mr World, he will embark on a variety of trips around the world as a Global Ambassador, speaking at events, working on humanitarian projects, and assisting the Miss World Organisation as an official representative.

During his reign, he has traveled to the United States, Haiti, Brazil, the United Kingdom, Hungary, Ukraine, Indonesia, and his homeland Colombia.

In 2016, he was guest judge in the final Mister World 2016 beauty pageant in Southport, England.

== Personal life ==
Escobar has been in a relationship with American influencer, Amanda Steele, since January 2022. They welcomed their first child, a daughter, in March 2023. As of January 2024, the two are no longer together.

Awards and achievements
Preceded by (Republic of Ireland) Kamal Ibrahim	Mister World; 2012	Succeeded by (Denmark) Nicklas Pedersen
Preceded by Camilo Tocancipa Garcia	Mister Colombia; 2012	Succeeded by Tomás Marin
