= Jonas Sulzbach =

Brazilian model (born 1986)

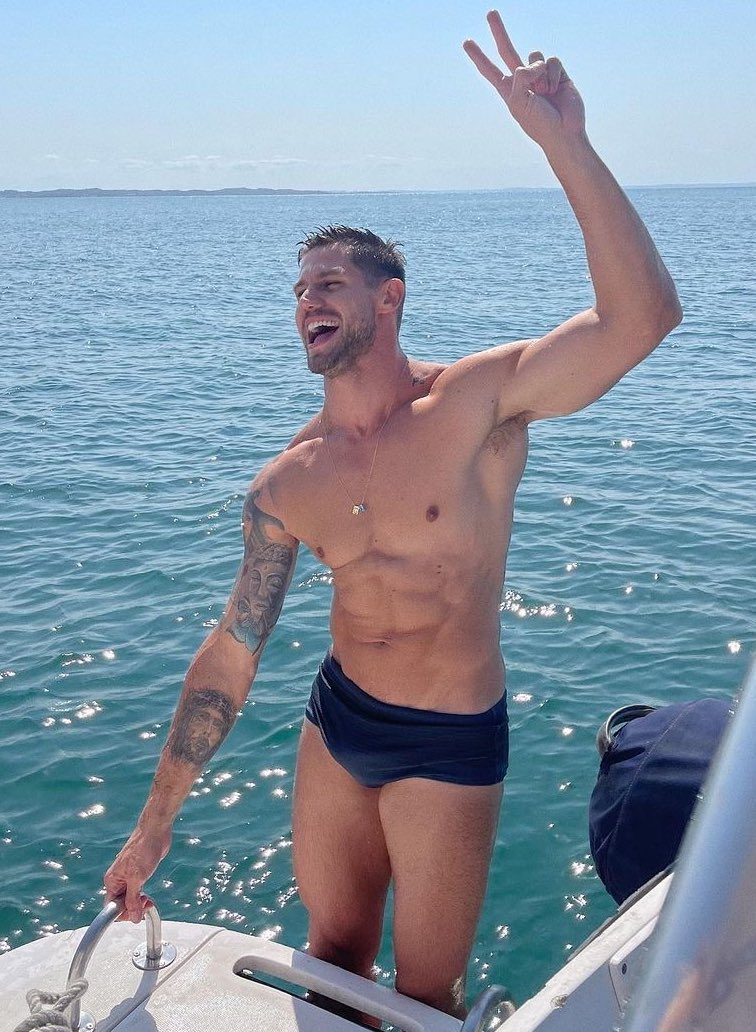
- Born: Jonas Fernando Sulzbach; February 7, 1986 (age 40); Lajeado, Rio Grande do Sul, Brazil
- Occupation: Model
- Children: 1
- Modeling information
- Height: 1.89 m (6 ft 2 in)
- Hair color: Blonde
- Eye color: Blue
- Agency: Mídia Brasil
- Website: Official page

Jonas Fernando Sulzbach (born February 7, 1986) is a Brazilian model. He is known for winning the Mister Brasil Mundo contest and for his participation in the twelfth season of the reality show Big Brother Brazil, where he was in third place.

He has campaigned for brands such as Pioneer, Chevrolet, Vuarnet, Riachuelo, Scala and has also been covered by Men's Health and Runner's magazines.

== Biography ==
Sulzbach was born in Lajeado, Rio Grande do Sul. He is of German, Italian, and Portuguese ancestry. He started modeling because of his mother's insistence. In 2004, at the age of 17, he moved to São Paulo to pursue his career, during which time he also worked as a bartender. After some years living in São Paulo, the young model's career began to take off and to succeed.

== Career ==
=== Mister Brazil 2010 ===
March 4, 2010, Jonas was won the Mister Brazil 2010 contest,

=== Mister World 2010 ===
On March 27, Jonas finished the competition between the semifinalists of the contest, which was won by the Irishman Kamal Ibrahim.

=== Big Brother Brazil ===
On January 4, 2012, Jonas was in twelfth edition of Big Brother Brasil, from Rede Globo, which premiered on January 10. He was in third place, winning a prize of 50 thousand reais and a car he won during the program.

=== Louco por Elas ===
After leaving the reality show, recorded a participation in the last episode of the first season of the series Louco por Elas, also on Globo. In the episode in which Jonas participated, he is Charmosão. Sulzbach played with Deborah Secco. The recordings took place at Macumba Beach, in Rio de Janeiro.

== Filmography ==
=== Television ===
Year	Title	Role	Notes	Ref.
2012	Big Brother Brasil 12	Himself	Housemate	
2012	Louco por Elas	Participation	Charming guy	
2026	Big Brother Brasil 26	Himself	Housemate	

== Early life ==
In June 2015 was born his first son, João Lucas, fruit of a relationship of only one night with model Natalia Vieira. He has dated model Mari Gonzalez from November 2015 until September 2023 but they have broken up.
