= Daniel Mejía =

Puerto Rican male pageant winner

- Born: Daniel Felip Mejía Romero; 1997 (age 28–29); San Juan, Puerto Rico
- Education: Stetson University
- Height: 1.88 m (6 ft 2 in)
- Title: Mister World 2024

Daniel "Danny" Felipe Mejía Romero is a Puerto Rican beauty pageant titleholder who won the Mister World 2024 title held in Vietnam, becoming the first Puerto Rican to win the title.

== Mister World 2024 ==
Mejía participated in Mister World 2024, held on 23 November 2024, in Phan Thiết, Vietnam, competing against 60 other contestants. During the event, he won both the sports challenge and the talent competition, reaching the top 20 semi-finalists in the grand finale. He received the sash and trophy from the outgoing titleholder, Jack Heslewood of England. His victory marked a history as he became the first Puerto Rican to win the Mister World title.

Awards and achievements
Preceded by (England) Jack Heslewood	Mister World; 2024	Succeeded by Incumbent
Preceded by José Cotto	Mister Mundo Puerto Rico; 2019	Succeeded by Incumbent
