= Lucas Gil =

Brazilian male model and Mister Brazil World 2007

- Born: Lucas Barbosa Gil; May 15, 1984 (age 41); Votuporanga, São Paulo, Brazil
- Occupation: Model
- Years active: 2007–present
- Modeling information
- Height: 191 cm (6 ft 3 in)
- Hair color: Dark brown
- Eye color: Brown
- Agency: Image Management (Brazil); Ford Models (Brazil); Kult Model Agency (Hamburg); Next Model Management (Miami); Major Model Management (Milan)

Lucas Barbosa Gil (born May 15, 1984) is a Brazilian male model and Mister Brazil World 2007. He represented Brazil to attend Mister World 2007 pageant on March 31, 2007, in Sanya, People's Republic of China and won the first Runner up. Later, he attended International Man 2007 contest on November 18, 2007 was held in Bali, Indonesia, and won the second Runner up.

== Early life and education ==
Lucas Gil is from Votuporanga, an inner city of São Paulo, Brazil. He completed a degree in Nutrition, but changed career direction when he entered and won the 2007 "Mr Brazil" beauty contest. He then went to "Mr World" where he was proclaimed first runner up and started to represent his country around the world.

== Modeling ==
Off the back of his success in modelling he was able to move to New York in 2009 to focus on his career as a runway model. His first job there was a photoshoot for "Brazilian Vogue" via Boss Models. He then went on to appear on the cover of Men's Health. Soon after winning, he appeared in a commercial for Colgate and Pepsi. He also appeared in different local and international brand campaigns such as Lupo, Rounderbum, Estivanelli, Raphael Steffens, Adidas, and Calvin Klein.

== Career ==
Besides from his successful venture in the modelling industry, he is also dedicated in influencing others and became a co-founder of Mahamudra Brasil which goal is to extract the best from each person regardless of who they are. Among the co-founders is his fellow Mister Brazil (2010) titleholder Jonas Sulzbach.

Preceded by Gustavo Gianetti	Mister Brazil; 2007	Succeeded by Vinícius Ribeiro
Preceded by Assaad Tarabay	Mister World 1st Runner up 2007	Succeeded by Josef Karas (athlete)
