= Reinaldo Dalcin =

Brazilian model, engineer, and male beauty pageant titleholder

- Born: Reinaldo Dalcin; Canoas, Rio Grande do Sul, Brazil
- Occupations: Model, mechanical engineer
- Beauty pageant titleholder
- Title: Mister Brazil 2013
- Years active: 2013–present
- Major competitions: Mister Brazil 2013 (winner); Mister World 2014

Reinaldo Dalcin is a Brazilian model and mechanical engineer who won the title of Mister Brazil in 2013.

== Early life and education ==
Dalcin was born in Canoas, Rio Grande do Sul, Brazil. He moved into the field of mechanical engineering while also working as a professional model. He studied engineering before beginning his career in fashion and pageantry.

== Pageant career ==
In April 2013, Dalcin represented the Delta do Jacuí Islands at the Mister Brazil competition held in Mangaratiba, Rio de Janeiro. Standing 1.80 m (5 ft 11 in), he won the national title on April 5, 2013, becoming the official representative of Brazil at the Mister World 2014 pageant.

At the Mister World 2014 competition, held on June 15 in Torbay, England, Dalcin competed in a series of physical, talent, and fashion-related challenges. He was noted particularly for his participation in the "Extreme Sports" fast-track event.

== Later career ==
After Mister World, Dalcin continued to work in both engineering and modeling. He has occasionally appeared at pageant-related events and remains active in fashion and public engagements in Brazil.

== Titles and achievements ==
- Mister Brazil 2013 – Winner
- Represented Brazil at Mister World 2014
- Recipient of Mister Brazil CNB's Personality Award

== See also ==
- Mister Brazil
- Mister World 2014
