= Alonso Fernández Alvarez =

Costa Rican model and male beauty pageant titleholder

- Born: Alonso Fernández Álvarez; March 16, 1982 (age 43); San José, Costa Rica
- Modeling information
- Height: 5 ft 11.5 in (1.82 m)
- Hair color: Black
- Eye color: Dark brown
- Website: www.alonsofernandez.net

Alonso Fernández Álvarez (born March 16, 1982) is a Costa Rican fashion model and beauty pageant titleholder who was crowned Mister Costa Rica 2007 He was a top 15 semifinalist in Manhunt International 2007 and Top 5 in Mister World 2007.

== Mister World Model 2007 ==
Alonso entered the Mister World Model 2007 pageant held on November 18, 2006 in Guatemala. He won Mister Congeniality, and placed first runner-up behind Alberto García of Venezuela who won.

== Manhunt International 2007 ==
Alonso competed in Manhunt International 2007 held at the new Kangwonland International Convention Centre, Korea on Saturday 10 February 2007 during winter, where he finished as a top-16 semifinalist ranking 7th place and won Mr. Photogenic.

== Mister World 2007 ==
Alonso, 24, a month later competed in Mister World 2007 and debuted as Costa Rica's first contestant sent to Mister World where he finished as Top 5 on March 31, 2007, in Sanya, People's Republic of China. He is the highest-placed Mister Costa Rica at Mister World and the first to make the finals. At the end of 2007 Beauty Mania conducted an online all-male pageant where Alonso was voted by viewers as Mister Handsome 2007.

Preceded by Gabriel Garro Reinhardt	Mister Manhunt Costa Rica; 2007	Succeeded by Cesar Vargas
Preceded by -	Mister World Costa Rica; 2007	Succeeded by Eduardo Cuberos
Preceded by Berni Madrigal	Mister International Costa Rica; 2009	Succeeded by Alexander Vega Hidalgo
