= Gustavo Gianetti =

Brazilian model, Mister World 2003, international male pageant winner

Gustavo Cabral Narciso Gianetti
- Born: Gustavo Cabral Narciso Gianetti; May 21, 1979 (age 46); Belo Horizonte, Brazil
- Occupation: Model
- Title: Mr World 2003; Mister Brazil 2001

Gustavo Cabral Narciso Gianetti (born May 21, 1979) is a Brazilian male model and beauty pageant contestant who was elected Mister World in 2003. He entered the pageant as Mister Brazil 2001.

== Biography ==
He studied law at the University of Juiz de Fora, with the ambition of becoming an international tax lawyer. He is also a model and has appeared in several television programmes including Britain's Next Top Model and Miss Brazil 2004 Gianetti has won prizes as a Capoeira fighter.

In 2007, Gianetti appeared on 'Britain's Next Top Model'. The models were sent to Brazil for their international destination during which they were given an acting challenge. Gianetti played their love interest in short scenes where the models had to speak Portuguese, and kiss and push Gianetti away.

Awards and achievements
Preceded by (Uruguay) Ignacio Kliche	Mister World; 2003	Succeeded by (Spain) Juan García Postigo
Preceded by Ramilio Zampiron	Mister Brazil; 2003	Succeeded by Lucas Gil
