= Mister World 2010 =

6th Mister World competition, male beauty pageant edition

- Mister World 2010 titlecard
- Date: March 27, 2010
- Presenters: Lee Da-hae; Alesha Dixon; Julien Kang; Steve Douglas
- Entertainment: Alesha Dixon; Paul Potts; Girls' Generation
- Venue: Songdo Convensia, Incheon, South Korea
- Broadcaster: MBC ESPN
- Entrants: 74
- Placements: 15
- Debuts: Azerbaijan; Belarus; Cyprus; Czech Republic; Ethiopia; Georgia; Guyana; Honduras; Indonesia; Japan; Kazakhstan; Luxembourg; Martinique; Mongolia; Montenegro; New Zealand; Paraguay; South Korea; Serbia
- Withdrawals: Albania; Austria; Barbados; Chile; Curaçao; Iceland; Liberia; Lithuania; Vietnam
- Returns: Angola; Croatia; France; Malaysia; Peru; Swaziland; Sweden; Thailand
- Winner: Kamal Ibrahim; Ireland

Mister World 2010 was the 6th edition of the Mister World competition. It was held at Songdo Convensia in Incheon, South Korea on March 27, 2010. 74 delegates competed from all around the world. Juan García Postigo of Spain crowned Kamal Ibrahim of Ireland at the end of the event.

== Introduction ==
For the first time, South Korea debuted in the contest and host the Mister World pageant from March 11 to March 27, 2010. Julia Morley said "I am so delighted that we will have the opportunity to showcase the beautiful country of Korea to the rest of the world as our contestants battle it out to find the world's most desirable man". The pageant is supported by the Korean government and people. It is also supported by the former Miss Worlds such as Denise Perrier (1953), Azra Akın (2002), María Julia Mantilla (2004), Taťána Kuchařová (2006) and Zhang Zilin (2007), together with the very first Mister World 1996 Tom Nuyens from Belgium.

== Judges ==
The judges' panel for Mister World 2010 consisted of the following personalities:

- Julia Morley – Chairwoman and CEO of Miss World LTD
- Tom Nuyens – Mister World 1996
- Zhang Zilin – Miss World 2007
- Ksenia Sukhinova – Miss World 2008
- Andre Kim – Korean designer
- Krish Naidoo – Miss World Organization International Ambassador
- Kaiane Aldorino – Miss World 2009
- Kim Joo-ri – Miss Korea 2009

== Contestants ==
Country	Contestant	Age	Height	Hometown
Angola	Jorge Bráulio Ferreira Martins	27	1.86 m (6 ft 1 in)	Luanda
Australia	Tim Boulenger	24	1.95 m (6 ft 5 in)	Gold Coast
Azerbaijan	Hafiz Aghayev	24	1.85 m (6 ft 1 in)	Baku
Bahamas	Kendrick Kemp	23	1.88 m (6 ft 2 in)	Nassau
Belarus	Mihail Baranau	21	1.87 m (6 ft 1 1/2 in)	Minsk
Belgium	Willem Lieve Hendrick Vermuyten	21	1.84 m (6 ft 1/2 in)	Mechelen
Bolivia	Jonatan Fischer Vargas	23	1.93 m (6 ft 4 in)	Cochabamba
Bosnia and Herzegovina	Dejan Radović	27	1.89 m (6 ft 2 1/2 in)	Sarajevo
Brazil	Jonas Sulzbach	24	1.89 m (6 ft 2 1/2 in)	Lajeado
Bulgaria	Martin Marinov	23	1.87 m (6 ft 1 1/2 in)	Sofia
Canada	Ron Wear	31	1.83 m (6 ft 0 in)	Edmonton
China	Lei Zhao	23	1.87 m (6 ft 1 1/2 in)	Beijing
Colombia	Camilo Tocancipa García	20	1.82 m (5 ft 11 1/2 in)	Bogotá
Costa Rica	Eduardo Esquivel Cuberos	19	1.88 m (6 ft 2 in)	Alajuela
Croatia	Dino Bubičić	27	1.91 m (6 ft 3 in)	Zagreb
Cyprus	Christos Christodoulides	27	1.80 m (5 ft 11 in)	Nicosia
Czech Republic	Josef Karas	31	1.91 m (6 ft 3 in)	Olomouc
Denmark	Kevin Skrøder	26	1.80 m (5 ft 11 in)	Valby
Dominican Republic	Ramón Alberto Uyola	24	1.88 m (6 ft 2 in)	Santiago de los Caballeros
Egypt	Tarek Naguib	26	1.87 m (6 ft 1 1/2 in)	Cairo
England	Andreas Kattou	24	1.84 m (6 ft 1/2 in)	Rugby
Ethiopia	Matewos Yilma Jigsa	26	1.97 m (6 ft 5 1/2 in)	Addis Ababa
France	Mohammed Al-Maiman	23	1.90 m (6 ft 3 in)	Paris
Georgia	Giorgi Orbeladze	18	1.86 m (6 ft 1 in)	Tbilisi
Germany	Michael Pichler	32	1.86 m (6 ft 1 in)	Düsseldorf
Greece	Lampros Danas	25	1.88 m (6 ft 2 in)	Athens
Guadeloupe	Emmanuel Binga	25	1.81 m (5 ft 11 1/2 in)	Morne-à-l'Eau
Guyana	Max Chung	21	1.80 m (5 ft 11 in)	Georgetown
Honduras	Carlos Saúl Orantes Ortega	20	1.81 m (5 ft 11 1/2 in)	La Lima
Hong Kong	Wesley Lee Chun Ming	23	1.88 m (6 ft 2 in)	Hong Kong
India	Inder Bajwa	27	1.80 m (5 ft 11 in)	Punjab
Indonesia	Todi Pandapotan	27	1.85 m (6 ft 1 in)	Jakarta
Ireland	Kamal Orlando Ibrahim	24	1.81 m (5 ft 11 1/2 in)	Limerick
Italy	Paolo Cosi	25	1.86 m (6 ft 1 in)	Corigliano d'Otranto
Japan	Hareruya Konno	26	1.87 m (6 ft 1 1/2 in)	Sapporo
Kazakhstan	Roman Mironov	24	1.96 m (6 ft 5 in)	Almaty
Kenya	Lwanda Jawar Kotengo	29	1.89 m (6 ft 2 1/2 in)	Nairobi
Latvia	Kristaps Punculis	22	1.90 m (6 ft 3 in)	Riga
Lebanon	Abdel Rahman El-Balaa	22	1.85 m (6 ft 1 in)	Beirut
Luxembourg	Carlo Marino	30	1.80 m (5 ft 11 in)	Luxembourg City
Macedonia FYRO	Ivan Nikšik	23	1.88 m (6 ft 2 in)	Skopje
Malaysia	David Lian Tze Wang	20	1.88 m (6 ft 2 in)	Kuala Lumpur
Malta	Mark Borg Spiteri	21	1.75 m (5 ft 9 in)	Marsascala
Martinique	Kévin Bellegarde	22	1.84 m (6 ft 1/2 in)	Fort-de-France
Mexico	Alvaro Álvarez Sepulveda	25	1.83 m (6 ft 0 in)	Mexico City
Mongolia	Galbadrakhyn Badarkh	23	1.86 m (6 ft 1 in)	Ulaanbaatar
Montenegro	Predrag Pavličić	23	1.88 m (6 ft 2 in)	Podgorica
Netherlands	Honza Jan Filipi	27	2.00 m (6 ft 6 1/2 in)	Hengelo
New Zealand	Arnold Arthur du Toit	26	1.82 m (5 ft 11 1/2 in)	Auckland
Nigeria	Kenneth Okolie	26	1.88 m (6 ft 2 in)	Lagos
Northern Ireland	Matthew Christopher Poole	20	1.88 m (6 ft 2 in)	Belfast
Norway	Chris André Eileng	26	1.80 m (5 ft 11 in)	Oslo
Panama	Héctor Javier Villarreal Franco	25	1.82 m (5 ft 11 1/2 in)	Panama City
Paraguay	Diego Andres Tuma Bogado	26	1.80 m (5 ft 11 in)	Asunción
Peru	Manuel Illich Lobatón	24	1.86 m (6 ft 1 in)	Lima
Philippines	Alvin Aldeosa de Joya	23	1.87 m (6 ft 1 1/2 in)	Manila
Poland	Maksymilian Lewandowski	18	1.91 m (6 ft 3 in)	Warsaw
Puerto Rico	Joshua Louis Dalmau Irizarry	25	1.91 m (6 ft 3 in)	Coamo
Romania	Voicu Ruşlan Pânzar	23	1.95 m (6 ft 5 in)	Bucharest
Russia	Sergey Kolenchikov	29	1.85 m (6 ft 1 in)	Saint Petersburg
Serbia	Vasa Nestorović	25	1.93 m (6 ft 4 in)	Belgrade
Singapore	Hu Hanxiong	25	1.75 m (5 ft 9 in)	Singapore
South Korea	Yoo Ji-kwang	24	1.86 m (6 ft 1 in)	Seoul
South Africa	Jaco de Bruyn	26	1.82 m (5 ft 11 1/2 in)	Pretoria
Spain	Guillermo García Becerril	24	1.92 m (6 ft 3 1/2 in)	Zaragoza
Sri Lanka	Hemal Sachindra Ranasinghe	25	1.82 m (5 ft 11 1/2 in)	Matale
Swaziland	Phakeme Okwakhe Dlamini	25	1.97 m (6 ft 5 1/2 in)	Manzini
Sweden	Alexander Siamak Shirpey	24	1.84 m (6 ft 1/2 in)	Stockholm
Thailand	Rattasart Rungsirithip	24	1.86 m (6 ft 1 in)	Chiang Mai
Turkey	Alper Aşlanoğlu	24	1.93 m (6 ft 4 in)	Istanbul
Ukraine	Yuriy Bogish	27	1.87 m (6 ft 1 1/2 in)	Kyiv
United States	Ivan Rusilko	26	1.83 m (6 ft 0 in)	Meadville
Venezuela	José Manuel Flores Sánchez	23	1.95 m (6 ft 5 in)	Caracas
Wales	Jonny Rees	24	1.78 m (5 ft 10 in)	Swansea

== Notes ==
=== Debuts ===
- Azerbaijan
- Belarus
- Cyprus
- Czech Republic
- Ethiopia
- Georgia
- Guyana
- Honduras
- Indonesia
- Japan
- Kazakhstan
- Martinique
- Mongolia
- Montenegro
- New Zealand
- Paraguay
- Serbia
- South Korea

=== Returns ===
Last competed in 1996:

- France
- Swaziland
- Sweden
- Thailand

Last competed in 1998:

- Malaysia
- Peru

Last competed in 2003:

- Angola
- Croatia

=== Withdraws ===
- Albania
- Austria
- Barbados
- Chile
- Curaçao
- Iceland
- Liberia
- Lithuania
- Vietnam

=== Crossovers ===
Mister International

- 2008: United States – Ivan Rusilko (Top 15)
- 2010: Australia – Tim Boulenger
- 2011: Canada – Ron Wear

Men Universe Model

- 2010: Australia – Tim Boulenger
- 2010: Cyprus – Christos Christodoulides (Top 5)
- 2010: Honduras – Carlos Saúl Orantes Ortega (Top 15)
- 2010: Peru – Manuel Illich Lobatón
- 2010: Ukraine – Yuriy Bogish
- 2011: Paraguay – Diego Andres Tuma Bogado
