= Kamal Ibrahim (presenter) =

TV presenter, Mister World 2010

Kamal Orlando Ibrahim
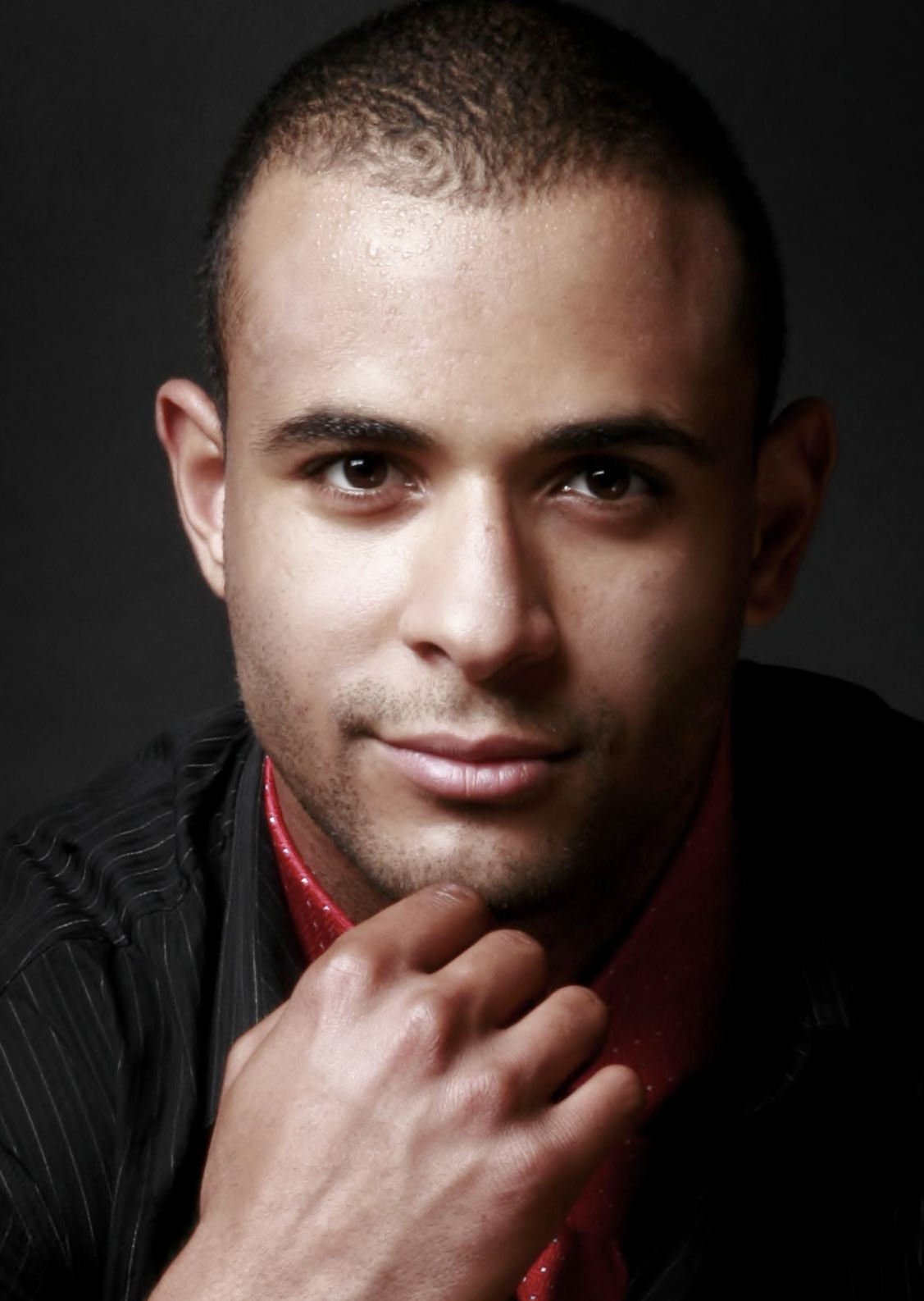
- Born: Kamal Orlando Ibrahim; 10 November 1985 (age 40); Limerick, Ireland
- Occupations: Television Presenter; Film Producer; Public Speaker; Pilot
- Known for: Mr World 2010; Irish National Lottery show Giant Studios
- Television: National Lottery, Mr World
- Title: Mr World 2010
- Children: 1 child,

Kamal Ibrahim (born 10 November 1985) is an Irish TV host, producer, public speaker and beauty pageant titleholder. He was also the winner of Mister World 2010, held in Incheon, South Korea on 27 March 2010.

== Early life ==
Kamal was born in Limerick, Ireland to a Nigerian father and an Italian mother; through his mother, Kamal is a cousin of American actor Danny DeVito.

== Career ==
Ibrahim began modeling at the age of 19 to further fund his pilot studies. At 23 he was entered into the Mr. Ireland contest, which he won. The following year in March 2010, he went to South Korea to represent Ireland at "Mr. World," the world's largest and most famous, "boot camp styled" male pageant. Of the 74 countries represented, Kamal placed first and was crowned "The world's most desirable man" and spent the following 2 years traveling the world as the global ambassador for the Mister World Organisation.

In January 2011 Kamal began his career in television after completing presenter training at The Park Studio in Dublin and Aspire Presenting in London to learn television production and train as a television presenter. In the summer of 2011 he enrolled at the Met Film School in Ealing studios in London where he trained as an actor; he also took up hip-hop, salsa and Jazz at Pineapple Dance Studios, received vocal training at the London Academy of Media, Film & Television, and worked intermittently as an online game show presenter for Gold Rush TV.

Kamal's presenting career progressed in 2012 when he was selected to host Mr. World with Myleene Klass. In 2013 he co-hosted a six-part documentary series on RTÉ Television in Ireland called In Your Shoes and in September 2013 he was paired up again with Myleene to host Miss World, which was broadcast live from Bali, Indonesia and aired to an audience of over 1 billion viewers via the official broadcaster RCTI and their international partners.

Kamal made his professional acting debut when he was cast by producer Robert C Kelly to play the lead role in the 2013 Christmas pantomime Aladdin, which ran 35 successful shows and also in 2013 Kamal was chosen to host the National Lottery Draws for the Irish broadcaster RTÉ which he continues to do to this day.

In 2020 Kamal returned to his passion for flying and is also working towards his commercial airline pilots license.

== Film career ==
From editing his own videos since in 2009 Kamal has continued to become a highly experienced content producer and shooting director and now has over 10 years experience working in the film and television industry.

While he works freelance as a producer and director he also owns and runs Giant Studios, a Dublin-based media production company specialising in the production of branded content, promotional videos, music videos, television commercials, corporate videos and independent film.

Kamal's filmography to-date includes the feature films SOUTH’ produced in 2016 followed by ‘RELEASE’ in 2017 for Bankhouse Pictures; his short film, If Only produced in 2017 and the feature-length documentary ‘Breaking Ice’ produced in 2018 & 2019 with Liberty Media and going on general release in June 2021.

== Charity work ==
In May 2010, Kamal was appointed the National Ambassador of the Variety Club of Ireland and has since helped to raise over $3,000,000 for the charity worldwide. He continues to work with Variety as well as a number of other charities helping sick, disabled and disadvantaged children and young adults.

== Mister World Title ==
As well as winning the contest in 2010, Kamal was a major part in the 2013 Mister World competition held in London and was involved in the selection process to crown the new Mister World, Francisco Javier Escobar Parra representing Colombia.

Awards and achievements
Preceded by (Spain) Juan García Postigo	Mister World; 2010	Succeeded by (Colombia) Francisco Escobar
Preceded by Simon Hales	Mister Ireland; 2010	Succeeded by Leo Delaney
