= Mister World 2007 =

5th Mister World competition, male beauty pageant edition

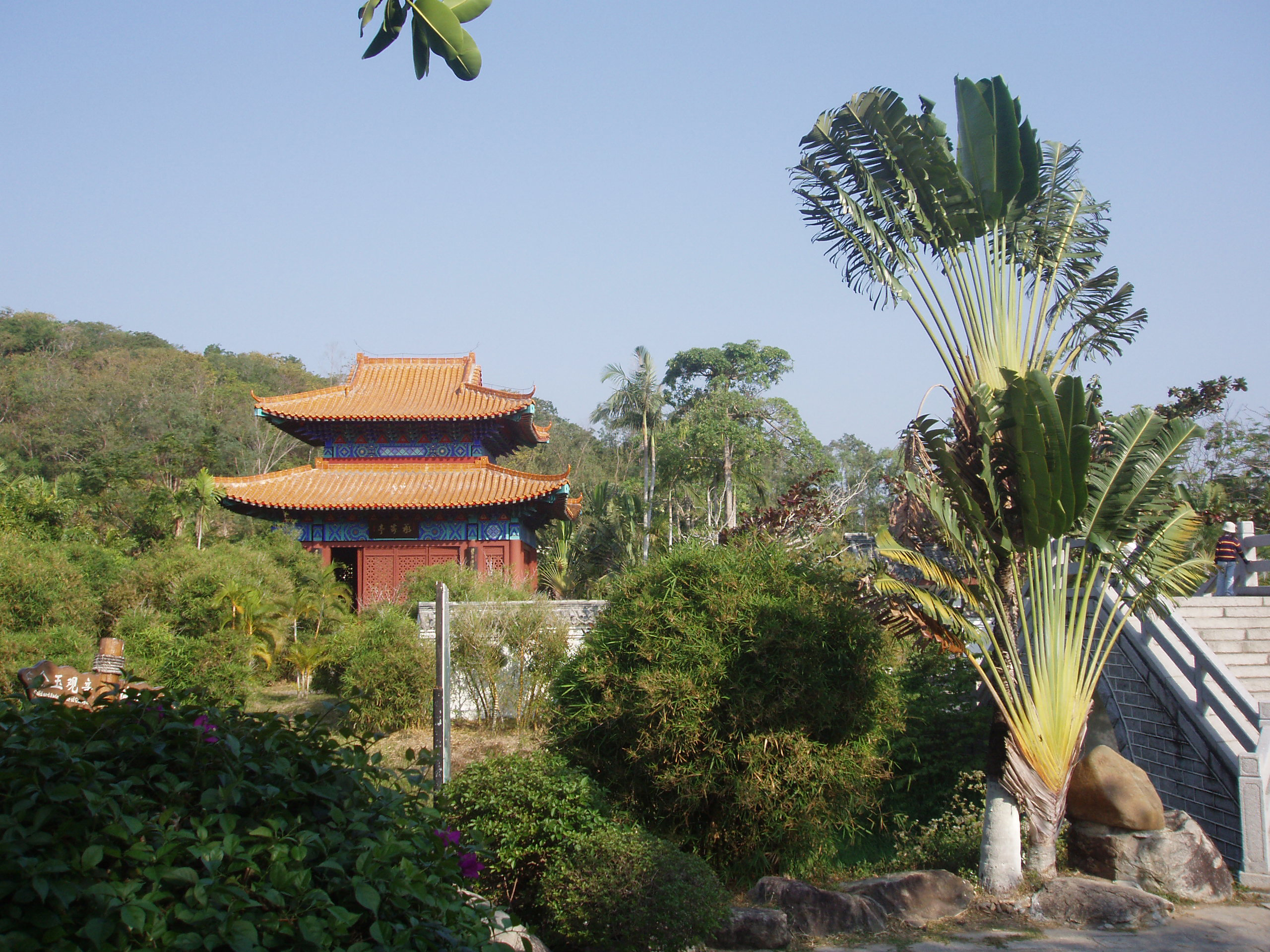
- Sanya, Hainan, host city for Mister World 2007
- Date: March 31, 2007
- Presenters: Heyling Chan, Tom Nuyens, Darren Campbell and Steve Douglas
- Venue: Crown of Beauty Theatre, Sanya, China
- Entrants: 56
- Placements: 12
- Debuts: Chile; Costa Rica; Curaçao; Denmark; Guadeloupe; Iceland; Kenya; Liberia; Lithuania; Nigeria; Panama; Vietnam
- Withdrawals: Angola; Aruba; Croatia; Guatemala; Scotland; Serbia and Montenegro; Uruguay
- Returns: Australia; Bahamas; Denmark; Egypt; Hong Kong; India; Ireland; Macedonia FYRO; Norway; Poland; South Africa; Turkey; United States
- Winner: Juan García Postigo; Spain

Mister World 2007 was the 5th edition of the Mister World competition. It was held on March 31, 2007 at the Crown of Beauty Theatre in Sanya, China. Gustavo Gianetti of Brazil crowned Juan Garcia Postigo of Spain at the end of the event.

== Results ==
=== Placements ===
Placement	Contestant
Mister World 2007	Spain – Juan Francisco García Postigo
1st Runner-Up	Brazil – Lucas Barbosa Gil
2nd Runner-Up	China – Lejun Tony Jiang
Top 5	Costa Rica – Alonso Fernández Alvarez; Chile – José Patricio Laguna Gebauer
Top 12	Austria – Matthias Thaler; India – Kawaljit Anand Singh; Lebanon – Anthony Hakim; Nigeria – Ikenna Bryan Okwara; Puerto Rico – Ariel Romeo Quiñones Morales; South Africa – Dieter Voigt; Ukraine – Ievgen Dudin

== Teams ==
Team	Mountain	Kung Fu	Assault Course	Water Sports
Countries	Curaçao; Spain; Greece; Vietnam; India; Poland; Puerto Rico; South Africa; Venezuela; Turkey; Northern Ireland; China	Austria; Philippines; Liberia; Malta; Kenya; Guadeloupe; Latvia; Dominican Republic; Belgium; Bolivia; Bosnia and Herzegovina; Russia; Netherlands; Colombia	Albania; Barbados; Bahamas; Ireland; Brazil; Costa Rica; Denmark; Egypt; Germany; England; Iceland; Macedonia FYRO; Hong Kong China; Wales; Sri Lanka; United States; Romania; Chile	Bulgaria; Norway; Canada; Ukraine; Italy; Lithuania; Mexico; Nigeria; Singapore; Australia; Panama; Lebanon

== Contestants ==
Country	Contestant	Age	Height	Hometown
Albania	Ervin Pepaj	20	1.84 m (6 ft 1/2 in)	Tirana
Australia	Harley von Moger	21	1.86 m (6 ft 1 in)	Geelong
Austria	Matthias Thaler	21	1.82 m (5 ft 11 1/2 in)	Innsbruck
Bahamas	Metellus Antoine Chipman	28	1.88 m (6 ft 2 in)	Nassau
Barbados	Fabian McDowald	19	1.85 m (6 ft 1 in)	Bridgetown
Belgium	Matthew Phillips	25	1.80 m (5 ft 11 in)	Antwerp
Bolivia	Julio César Aguilera Rau	26	1.83 m (6 ft 0 in)	Cochabamba
Bosnia and Herzegovina	Nebojša Malešević	23	1.89 m (6 ft 2 1/2 in)	Banja Luka
Brazil	Lucas Barbosa Gil	22	1.91 m (6 ft 3 in)	Votuporanga
Bulgaria	Giorgi Zhekov	23	1.80 m (5 ft 11 in)	Sliven
Canada	Darren Storsley	31	1.82 m (5 ft 11 1/2 in)	Vancouver
Chile	José Patricio Laguna Gebauer	29	1.90 m (6 ft 3 in)	Santiago
China	Lejun Tony Jiang	27	1.80 m (5 ft 11 in)	Shanghai
Colombia	Hugo Villegas	21	1.86 m (6 ft 1 in)	Bogotá
Costa Rica	Alonso Fernández Alvarez	24	1.82 m (5 ft 11 1/2 in)	San Jose
Curaçao	Henry Romero Rodríguez	23	1.85 m (6 ft 1 in)	Willemstad
Denmark	Brian Nonbo	26	1.87 m (6 ft 1 1/2 in)	Silkeborg
Dominican Republic	Johaney Wilfredo Albor Linero	24	1.85 m (6 ft 1 in)	Santo Domingo
Egypt	Omar Awad	25	1.86 m (6 ft 1 in)	Cairo
England	Warren Harvey	24	2.00 m (6 ft 6 1/2 in)	Bournemouth
Germany	Mark Wilke	35	1.89 m (6 ft 2 1/2 in)	Tangerhütte
Greece	Nikitas Giannakos	29	1.86 m (6 ft 1 in)	Athens
Guadeloupe	Siegfried Ventadour	22	1.81 m (5 ft 11 1/2 in)	Petit-Bourg
Hong Kong	François Huynh	21	1.78 m (5 ft 10 in)	Hong Kong
Iceland	Jón Gunnlaugur Viggósson	24	1.93 m (6 ft 4 in)	Reykjavík
India	Kawaljit Anand Singh	26	1.85 m (6 ft 1 in)	Assam
Ireland	Simon Hales	24	1.88 m (6 ft 2 in)	Dublin
Italy	Carlo Martellini	24	1.87 m (6 ft 1 1/2 in)	Leece
Kenya	Gabriel Omolo Ouma	23	1.82 m (5 ft 11 1/2 in)	Nairobi
Latvia	Artūrs Mihailovs	23	1.87 m (6 ft 1 1/2 in)	Riga
Lebanon	Anthony Hakim	25	1.87 m (6 ft 1 1/2 in)	Beirut
Liberia	Emmett Massaquoi	32	1.80 m (5 ft 11 in)	Monrovia
Lithuania	Gintaras Kuculis	25	1.89 m (6 ft 2 1/2 in)	Punskas
Macedonia FYRO	Gjorgi Filipov	20	1.89 m (6 ft 2 1/2 in)	Skopje
Malta	David Camenzuli	21	1.85 m (6 ft 1 in)	Sliema
Mexico	Jorge Iván Aceves Villalpando	22	1.86 m (6 ft 1 in)	Guadalajara
Netherlands	Quintin Colicchia	29	1.87 m (6 ft 1 1/2 in)	Amsterdam
Nigeria	Ikenna Bryan Okwara	20	1.91 m (6 ft 3 in)	Imo
Northern Ireland	Ross Lauder	21	1.88 m (6 ft 2 in)	Belfast
Norway	Sivert Aassve	19	1.86 m (6 ft 1 in)	Steinkjer
Panama	Diego Alejandro Cedeño de Obaldia	27	1.88 m (6 ft 2 in)	Panama City
Philippines	Emmanuel Balon Mago	26	1.90 m (6 ft 3 in)	Manila
Poland	Daniel Madej	25	1.91 m (6 ft 3 in)	Żywiec
Puerto Rico	Ariel Romeo Quiñones Morales	25	1.90 m (6 ft 3 in)	Salinas
Romania	Razvan Constantin Dobre	26	1.82 m (5 ft 11 1/2 in)	Bucharest
Russia	Roman Demchenko	28	1.85 m (6 ft 1 in)	Moscow
Singapore	Reuben Kee En Rui†	22	1.84 m (6 ft 1/2 in)	Singapore
South Africa	Dieter Voigt	23	1.84 m (6 ft 1/2 in)	Mossel Bay
Spain	Juan Francisco García Postigo	25	1.91 m (6 ft 3 in)	Málaga
Sri Lanka	Shibani Shaban Basiron	19	1.88 m (6 ft 2 in)	Colombo
Turkey	Ertem Eşer	25	1.84 m (6 ft 1/2 in)	Istanbul
Ukraine	Ievgen Dudin	25	1.84 m (6 ft 1/2 in)	Sevastopol
United States	Travis Alexander Kraft	27	1.83 m (6 ft 0 in)	Bismarck
Venezuela	Vito Ernesto Gasparrini Domínguez	31	1.92 m (6 ft 3 1/2 in)	Caracas
Vietnam	Hồ Đức Vĩnh	23	1.87 m (6 ft 1 1/2 in)	Ho Chi Minh City
Wales	Leigh Brookman	23	1.86 m (6 ft 1 in)	Pontypridd
