= Mister World 2003 =

4th Mister World competition, male beauty pageant edition

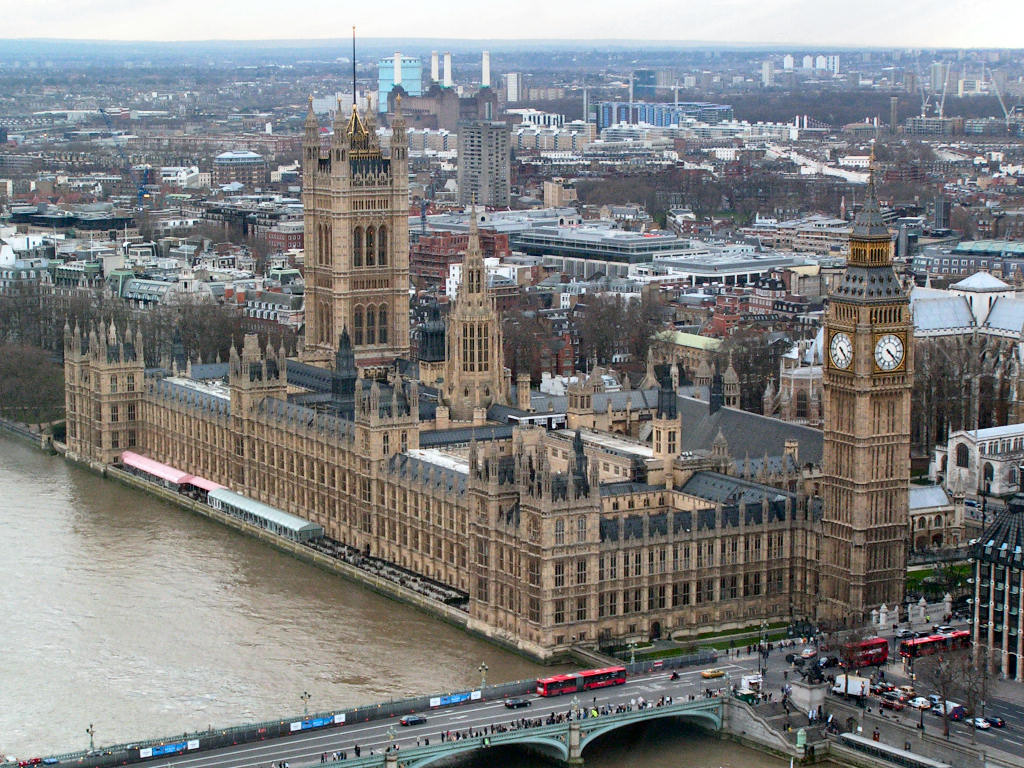
- London, host city for Mister World 2003
- Date: August 9, 2003
- Presenters: Suzi Perry
- Entertainment: Barbara Baldieri
- Venue: Brewery Hall, London, England
- Entrants: 38
- Placements: 10
- Debuts: Albania; Barbados; Bosnia and Herzegovina; China; England; Northern Ireland; Romania; Serbia and Montenegro; Scotland; Wales
- Withdrawals: Argentina; Bahamas; Hong Kong; Ireland; Israel; Slovenia; Turkey; United Kingdom; United States; Zambia
- Returns: Aruba; Austria; Canada; Holland; Italy; Latvia; Malta
- Winner: Gustavo Narciso Gianetti; Brazil

Mister World 2003 was the 4th edition of the Mister World competition. It was held at the Brewery Hall in London, England on August 9, 2003. Ignacio Kliche of Uruguay crowned Gustavo Narciso Gianetti of Brazil at the end of the event.

== Results ==
=== Placements ===
Placement	Contestant
Mister World 2003	Brazil – Gustavo Cabral Narciso Gianetti
1st Runner-Up	Lebanon – Assaad Tarabay
2nd Runner-Up	Belgium – Fabien Hauquier
Top 5	Mexico – José Luis Reséndez Santos; Barbados – Ronnie Morris
Top 10	Aruba – Kelvin Osmond Halley; China – Shuang Jian Zhou; Malta – Matthew Saliba; Singapore – Julian Hee Lic Hua; Venezuela – Andrés Eduardo Mistage

=== Special awards ===
Award	Contestant
Best in Talent	Barbados – Ronnie Morris

== Contestants ==
Country	Contestant	Age	Height	Hometown
Albania	Gerald Shahu	19	1.89 m (6 ft 2 1/2 in)	Tirana
Angola	António Adelino Valentim	22	1.84 m (6 ft 1/2 in)	Luanda
Aruba	Kelvin Osmond Halley	18	1.79 m (5 ft 10 1/2 in)	Oranjestad
Austria	Michael Schüller	23	1.82 m (5 ft 11 1/2 in)	Linz
Barbados	Ronnie Morris	23	1.80 m (5 ft 11 in)	Bridgetown
Belgium	Fabien Hauquier	26	1.89 m (6 ft 2 1/2 in)	Geel
Bolivia	Alejandro Suárez Velarde	25	1.84 m (6 ft 1/2 in)	Santa Cruz de la Sierra
Bosnia and Herzegovina	Birnas Ibrahimagić	22	1.90 m (6 ft 3 in)	Zenica
Brazil	Gustavo Cabral Narciso Gianetti	24	1.85 m (6 ft 1 in)	Belo Horizonte
Bulgaria	Danail Milev	20	1.80 m (5 ft 11 in)	Stara Zagora
Canada	Adam Dreaddy	26	1.81 m (5 ft 11 1/2 in)	Edmonton
China	Shuang Jian Zhou	28	1.93 m (6 ft 4 in)	Beijing
Colombia	Leonardo Morán	26	1.85 m (6 ft 1 in)	Medellín
Croatia	Bojan Milohanović	24	1.89 m (6 ft 2 1/2 in)	Rijeka
England	Johnny Marsden	18	1.85 m (6 ft 1 in)	Ormskirk
Germany	Joachim Federer	23	1.96 m (6 ft 5 in)	Berg
Greece	Athanasios Chergkeletzis	25	1.82 m (5 ft 11 1/2 in)	Athens
Guatemala	José Fernando Turcios Domínguez	22	1.85 m (6 ft 1 in)	Guatemala City
Holland	Bas Hendriks	23	1.86 m (6 ft 1 in)	Amsterdam
Italy	Fabrizio Lecca	24	1.88 m (6 ft 2 in)	Cagliari
Latvia	Kaspars Patašs	27	1.86 m (6 ft 1 in)	Riga
Lebanon	Assaad Tarabay	21	1.89 m (6 ft 2 1/2 in)	Beirut
Malta	Matthew Saliba	22	1.89 m (6 ft 2 1/2 in)	Sliema
Mexico	José Luis Reséndez Santos	24	1.86 m (6 ft 1 in)	Monterrey
Northern Ireland	Martin McHugh	20	1.78 m (5 ft 10 in)	Armagh
Philippines	Marco Antonio Tamayo	23	1.85 m (6 ft 1 in)	Davao City
Puerto Rico	Edwin Enrique Iglesias Colón	19	1.87 m (6 ft 1 1/2 in)	Guaynabo
Romania	Adrian Ilie Asandei	24	1.89 m (6 ft 2 1/2 in)	Constanța
Russia	Alexei Pershin	25	1.92 m (6 ft 3 1/2 in)	Moscow
Scotland	Gordon Travis	20	1.85 m (6 ft 1 in)	Glasgow
Serbia and Montenegro	Milentije Andrejić	26	1.86 m (6 ft 1 in)	Belgrade
Singapore	Julian Hee Lic Hua	25	1.81 m (5 ft 11 1/2 in)	Singapore
Spain	Isaac Vidjrakou Burgos	24	1.93 m (6 ft 4 in)	Tarragona
Sri Lanka	Roshan Massilamany	22	1.85 m (6 ft 1 in)	Ratmalana
Ukraine	Vasil Pakhomov	19	1.87 m (6 ft 1 1/2 in)	Makiyivka
Uruguay	Andrés dos Santos	26	1.90 m (6 ft 3 in)	Montevideo
Venezuela	Andrés Eduardo Mistage Parilli	22	1.91 m (6 ft 3 in)	Valencia
Wales	Rhodri Jenkins	21	1.83 m (6 ft 0 in)	Gower

== Judges ==
- Julia Morley Chairwoman of Miss World Limited
- Azra Akin – Miss World 2002 from Turkey
- Sophie Blake
- Jodie Marsh
- James Mullinger
- Tom Nuyens
- Cleo Rocos
