= Mister World 1996 =

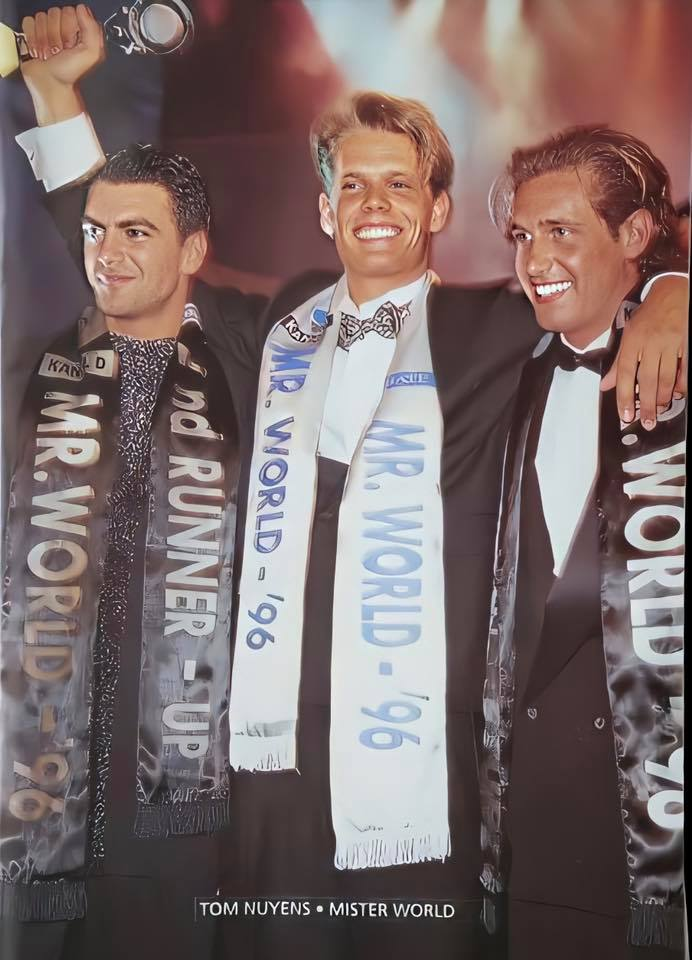
- Top 3 Mister World 1996
- Date: September 20, 1996
- Presenters: Peter Marshall; Korhan Abay; Berna Laçin
- Venue: Anadolu Auditorium, Şişli, Istanbul, Turkey
- Entrants: 50
- Placements: 10
- Debuts: Argentina; Aruba; Australia; Austria; Belgium; Bolivia; Botswana; Brazil; Bulgaria; Canada; Colombia; Croatia; Dominican Republic; Estonia; France; Germany; Greece; Holland; Hungary; India; Ireland; Israel; Italy; Jamaica; Latvia; Lebanon; Macedonia FYRO; Malaysia; Mexico; Norway; Philippines; Poland; Puerto Rico; Russia; Singapore; Slovakia; Slovenia; South Africa; Spain; Swaziland; Sweden; Taiwan ROC; Thailand; Trinidad and Tobago; Turkey; Ukraine; United Kingdom; United States; Venezuela; Yugoslavia
- Winner: Tom Nuyens; Belgium
- Personality: Felix Chavaphi; Botswana

Mister World 1996 was the first Mister World competition, held at the Anadolu Auditorium in Istanbul, Turkey, on September 20, 1996. Tom Nuyens of Belgium was crowned as the first Mister World at the end of the event.

== Results ==
=== Placements ===
Placement	Contestant
Mister World 1996	Belgium – Tom Nuyens
1st Runner-Up	Mexico – Gabriel Soto Borja-Díaz
2nd Runner-Up	Turkey – Karahan Çantay
Top 5	Jamaica – Richard Nevers; Puerto Rico – Eliseo Paulo Cortés
Top 10	Aruba – Anthony Andrew Martinez; India – Bikram Singh Saluja; Sweden – Tage Johan Jelse; Thailand – Direk Sirisamphan; United Kingdom – Simon Alexis Peat

=== Special awards ===
Award	Contestant
Mister Personality	Botswana – Felix Chavaphi

== Contestants ==
Country	Contestant	Age	Height	Hometown
Argentina	Raul Orlando Proietto	21	1.83 m (6 ft 0 in)	Buenos Aires
Aruba	Anthony Andrew Martinez	23	1.88 m (6 ft 2 in)	Oranjestad
Australia	Arlington Brendan Leigh	22	1.80 m (5 ft 11 in)	Sydney
Austria	Helmut Strebl	27	1.90 m (6 ft 3 in)	Vienna
Belgium	Tom Nuyens	20	1.92 m (6 ft 3 1/2 in)	Wommelgem
Bolivia	Marcelo Mauricio Ostria Borda	21	1.90 m (6 ft 3 in)	Tarija
Botswana	Felix Chavaphi	23	1.70 m (5 ft 7 in)	Gaborone
Brazil	Thierre di Castro Garrito	17	1.95 m (6 ft 5 in)	Rio Claro
Bulgaria	Boyko Hristov	23	1.85 m (6 ft 1 in)	Sofia
Canada	Jimmy Rai	24	1.80 m (5 ft 11 in)	Toronto
Colombia	Franz Serrano	25	1.80 m (5 ft 11 in)	San Andrés
Croatia	Ivan Klemenčič	20	1.86 m (6 ft 1 in)	Split
Dominican Republic	Juan Salvador Vidal Gil	19	1.83 m (6 ft 0 in)	Santo Domingo
Estonia	Andrus Raissar	22	1.88 m (6 ft 2 in)	Tartu
France	Laurent Piranian	24	1.86 m (6 ft 1 in)	Mandelieu-la-Napoule
Germany	Konrad Meyer	22	1.83 m (6 ft 0 in)	Düsseldorf
Greece	Harry Kinatzi	26	1.90 m (6 ft 3 in)	Athens
Holland	Joost Ammerlaan	24	1.88 m (6 ft 2 in)	Schipluiden
Hungary	Zsolt Cséke	21	1.88 m (6 ft 2 in)	Budapest
India	Bikram Singh Saluja	22	1.83 m (6 ft 0 in)	Mumbai
Ireland	Thomas Daniel Plewman	25	1.80 m (5 ft 11 in)	Dublin
Israel	Zafrir Ben-Zvi	23	1.86 m (6 ft 1 in)	Haifa
Italy	Angelo d'Amelio	24	1.83 m (6 ft 0 in)	Taranto
Jamaica	Richard Nevers	20	1.92 m (6 ft 3 1/2 in)	Kingston
Latvia	Vilnis Solovjovs	25	1.90 m (6 ft 3 in)	Riga
Lebanon	Hadi Esta	24	1.88 m (6 ft 2 in)	Beirut
Macedonia FYRO	Gazmend Beriša	23	1.86 m (6 ft 1 in)	Skopje
Malaysia	Alwin Low Dai Wen	22	1.82 m (5 ft 11 1/2 in)	Kuala Lumpur
Mexico	Gabriel Soto Borja-Díaz	21	1.85 m (6 ft 1 in)	Mexico City
Norway	Otto Thorbjørnsen	22	1.82 m (5 ft 11 1/2 in)	Stavanger
Philippines	Christopher Celis	20	1.80 m (5 ft 11 in)	Manila
Poland	Mariusz Trzciński	23	1.94 m (6 ft 4 1/2 in)	Gdańsk
Puerto Rico	Eliseo Paulo Cortés Meléndez	25	1.82 m (5 ft 11 1/2 in)	San Juan
Russia	Oleg Sukochenko	23	1.92 m (6 ft 3 1/2 in)	Yekaterinburg
Singapore	Desmond Kong Hua Ng	24	1.75 m (5 ft 9 in)	Singapore
Slovakia	Richard Ondrias	22	1.85 m (6 ft 1 in)	Bratislava
Slovenia	Marko Vraničar	20	1.85 m (6 ft 1 in)	Ljubljana
South Africa	Charl Hector Coode	24	1.88 m (6 ft 2 in)	Johannesburg
Spain	José Ramon Gutiérrez Villar	22	1.92 m (6 ft 3 1/2 in)	A Coruña
Swaziland	Thulani Emmanuel Matsebula	24	1.88 m (6 ft 2 in)	Manzini
Sweden	Tage Johan Jelse	23	1.85 m (6 ft 1 in)	Skarpnäck
Taiwan ROC	Kuo Pin-chao	19	1.87 m (6 ft 1 1/2 in)	Taipei
Thailand	Direk Sirisamphan	18	1.80 m (5 ft 11 in)	Bangkok
Trinidad and Tobago	Ian Anthony Comissiong	25	1.80 m (5 ft 11 in)	Port of Spain
Turkey	Karahan Çantay	22	1.85 m (6 ft 1 in)	Balıkesir
Ukraine	Mykola Bezrodniy	26	1.93 m (6 ft 4 in)	Kyiv
United Kingdom	Simon Alexis Peat	23	1.88 m (6 ft 2 in)	Liverpool
United States	Daniel Luján	23	1.88 m (6 ft 2 in)	El Paso
Venezuela	José Gregorio Faría Ojeda	24	1.91 m (6 ft 3 in)	Maracaibo
Yugoslavia	Slobodan Klinać	22	1.91 m (6 ft 3 in)	Belgrade

== Judges ==
- Bruce Forsyth - Entertainer
- Ninibeth Leal - Miss World 1991 from Venezuela
- Wilnelia Merced - Miss World 1975 from Puerto Rico
- Eric Morley - Chairman and CEO of Miss World Organization
- Linda Pétursdóttir - Miss World 1988 from Iceland
- Naim Süleymanoğlu - Olympic gold medalist
- Ivana Trump - Businesswoman
