= Mister World =

International male beauty pageant competition

- Formation: 1996
- Founder: Eric Morley
- Type: Male Pageant
- Headquarters: London
- Location: England
- Official language: English
- President: Julia Morley
- Current titleholder: Daniel Mejía; Puerto Rico
- Website: www.mrworld.tv

Mister World competition is an international male beauty pageant founded by the Miss World Organization in 1996. The entrants compete in various activities including waterskiing, mountain biking, swimming, and marathon running.

The current titleholder, Mister World 2024, is Daniel Mejía from Puerto Rico, who was crowned on November 23, 2024, at NovaWorld Phan Thiết, Bình Thuận, Vietnam.

== Titleholders ==
Edition	Year	Date	Mister World	Runners-Up			Location	Entrants
Edition	Year	Date	Mister World	First	Second	Third	Location	Entrants
1st	1996	September 20, 1996	Tom Nuyens; Belgium	Gabriel Soto Borja-Díaz; Mexico	Karahan Çantay; Turkey	Not awarded	Istanbul, Turkey	50
2nd	1998	September 18, 1998	Sandro Finoglio; Venezuela	Germán Cardoso Méndez; Puerto Rico	Gregory Rossi; France	Not awarded	Grândola, Portugal	43
3rd	2000	October 13, 2000	Ignacio Kliche; Uruguay	Marcello Barkowski; Germany	Dante Spencer; United States	Not awarded	Perthshire, Scotland	32
4th	2003	August 9, 2003	Gustavo Gianetti; Brazil	Assaad Tarabay; Lebanon	Fabien Hauquier; Belgium	Not awarded	London, England	38
5th	2007	March 31, 2007	Juan García Postigo; Spain	Lucas Barbosa Gil; Brazil	Lejun Tony Jiang; China	Not awarded	Sanya, China	56
6th	2010	March 27, 2010	Kamal Ibrahim; Ireland	Josef Karas; Czech Republic	Kenneth Okolie; Nigeria	Not awarded	Incheon, South Korea	74
7th	2012	November 24, 2012	Francisco Escobar; Colombia	Andrew Wolff; Philippines	Leo Delaney; Ireland	Not awarded	Kent, England	48
8th	2014	June 15, 2014	Nicklas Pedersen; Denmark	Emmanuel Ikubese; Nigeria	José Pablo Minor; Mexico	Not awarded	Torbay, England	46
9th	2016	July 19, 2016	Rohit Khandelwal; India	Fernando Álvarez; Puerto Rico	Aldo Esparza; Mexico	Not awarded	Southport, England	46
10th	2019	August 23, 2019	Jack Heslewood; England	Fezile Mkhize; South Africa	Brian Faugier; Mexico	Not awarded	Quezon City, Philippines	72
11th	2024	November 23, 2024	Daniel Mejía; Puerto Rico	Phạm Tuấn Ngọc; Vietnam	Antonio Company; Spain	Salvatore Crisball; Angola	Phan Thiết, Vietnam	60
12th	2026	TBA						

=== Gallery of winners ===
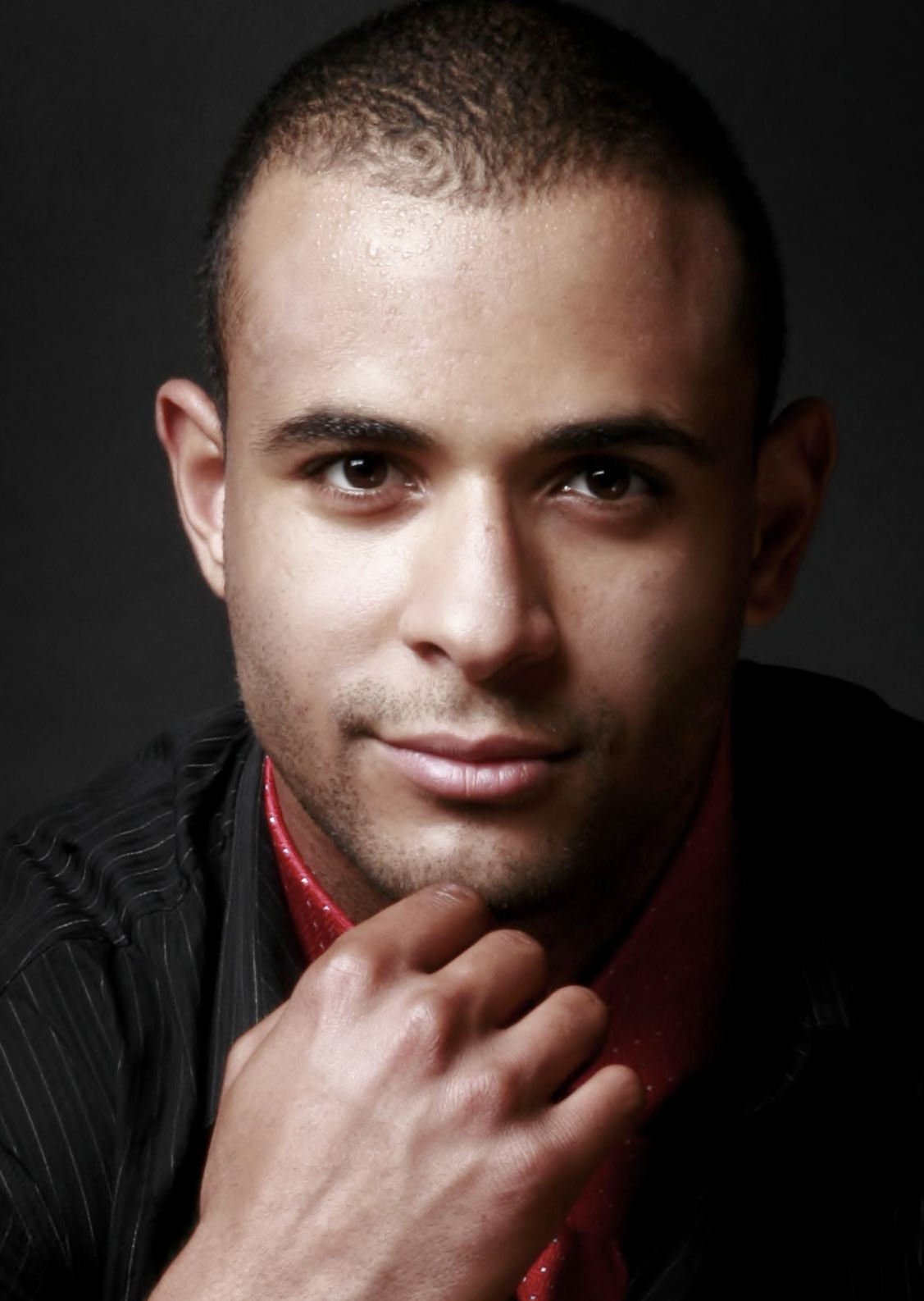
Mister World 2010
Kamal Ibrahim

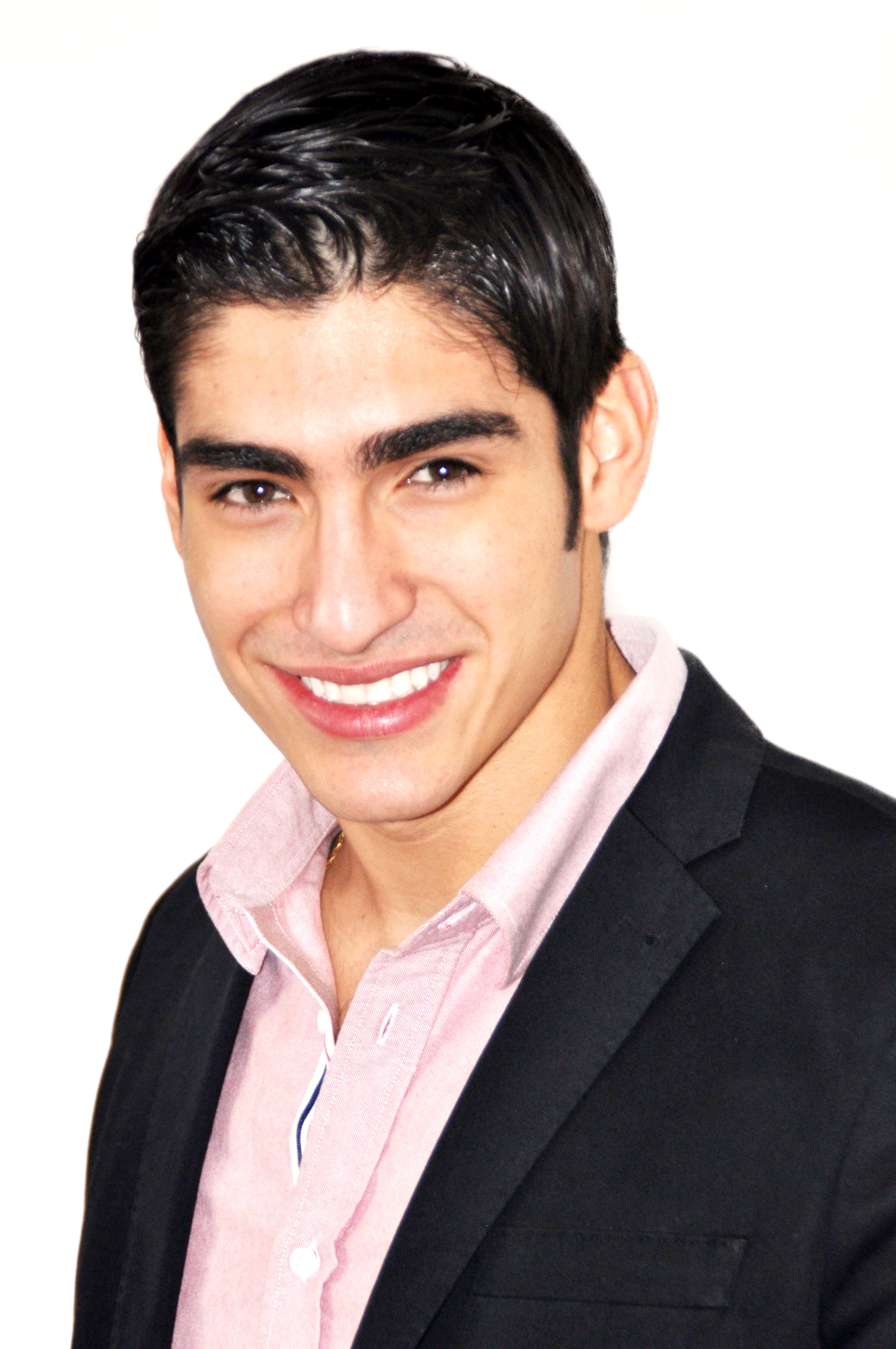
Mister World 2012
Francisco Escobar

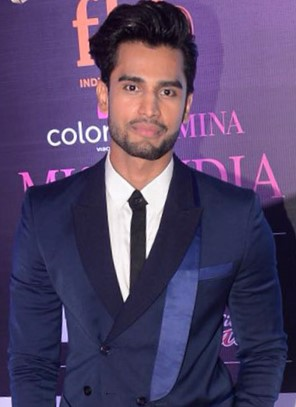
Mister World 2016
Rohit Khandelwal

=== League tables ===
==== Country by number of wins ====
Country	Titles	Year
Puerto Rico	1	2024
England	1	2019
India	1	2016
Denmark	1	2014
Colombia	1	2012
Ireland	1	2010
Spain	1	2007
Brazil	1	2003
Uruguay	1	2000
Venezuela	1	1998
Belgium	1	1996

==== Continents by number of wins ====
Continent	Titles	Years
Americas	5	1998, 2000, 2003, 2012, 2024
Europe	5	1996, 2007, 2010, 2014, 2019
Asia	1	2016

=== Continental Winners ===
Year	Mister World Africa	Mister World Americas	Mister World Asia	Mister World Oceania	Mister World Caribbean	Mister World Europe
Year	Mister World Africa	Mister World Americas	Mister World Asia Pacific		Mister World Caribbean	Mister World Europe
2019	Fezile Mkhize; South Africa	Brian Faugier; Mexico	Jody Tejano Saliba; Philippines		Alejandro Martínez; Dominican Republic	Alberto Nodale; Austria
2024	Salvatore Crisball; Angola	Juan Alberto García; Venezuela	Phạm Tuấn Ngọc; Vietnam	Lochlan Carey; Australia	Tarique Barrett; Jamaica	Antonio Company; Spain

== Finalists ranking ==
Rank	Country/Territory	Mister World	Runners-up			Total
Rank	Country/Territory	Mister World	First	Second	Third	Total
1	Puerto Rico	1 (2024)	2 (1998, 2016)	×	×	3
2	Brazil	1 (2003)	1 (2007)	×	×	2
3	Ireland	1 (2010)	×	1 (2012)	×	2
3	Spain	1 (2007)	×	1 (2024)	×	2
3	Belgium	1 (1996)	×	1 (2003)	×	2
6	England	1 (2019)	×	×	×	1
6	India	1 (2016)	×	×	×	1
6	Denmark	1 (2014)	×	×	×	1
6	Colombia	1 (2012)	×	×	×	1
6	Uruguay	1 (2000)	×	×	×	1
6	Venezuela	1 (1998)	×	×	×	1
12	Mexico	×	1 (1996)	3 (2014, 2016, 2019)	×	4
13	Nigeria	×	1 (2014)	1 (2010)	×	2
14	Vietnam	×	1 (2024)	×	×	1
14	South Africa	×	1 (2019)	×	×	1
14	Philippines	×	1 (2012)	×	×	1
14	Czech Republic	×	1 (2010)	×	×	1
14	Lebanon	×	1 (2003)	×	×	1
14	Germany	×	1 (2000)	×	×	1
20	China	×	×	1 (2007)	×	1
20	United States	×	×	1 (2000)	×	1
20	France	×	×	1 (1998)	×	1
20	Turkey	×	×	1 (1996)	×	1
24	Angola	×	×	×	1 (2024)	1
Rank	Total	11	11	11	1	34

== See also ==
- Manhunt International
- Mister International
- Mister Supranational
- Man of the World
- Mister Global
