= Mister Pilipinas Worldwide 2025 =

3rd Mister Pilipinas Worldwide pageant

Mister Pilipinas Worldwide
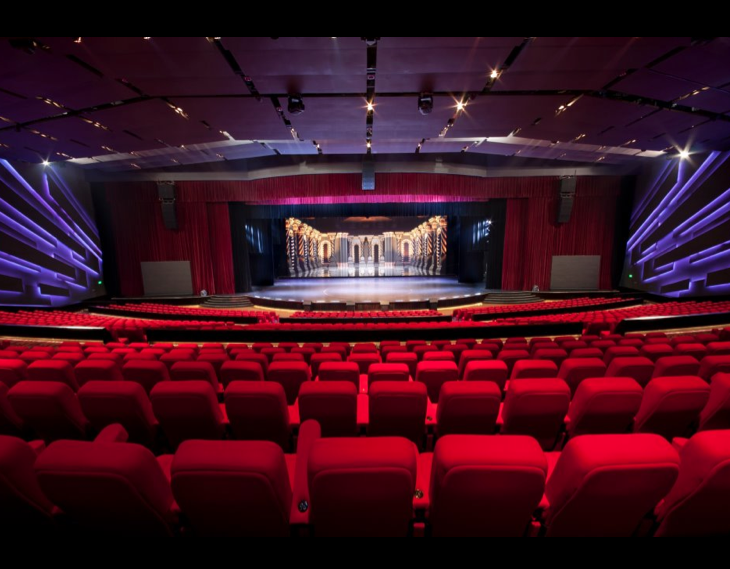
- Newport Performing Arts Theater
- Date: April 28, 2025
- Presenters: Pauline Amelinckx
- Venue: Newport Performing Arts Theater, Pasay, Metro Manila
- Broadcaster: PlayTime (online streaming via Facebook)
- Entrants: 26
- Placements: 15
- Congeniality: Giuseppe Aglianó (Filipino Community in Italy)
- Photogenic: Raven Renz Lansangan (Pampanga)

The Mister Pilipinas Worldwide 2025 was the third edition of the Mister Pilipinas Worldwide pageant that took place on April 28, 2025, at the Newport Performing Arts Theater in Pasay, Philippines. The Mister Pilipinas Worldwide 2024 winners passed on their titles to their respective successors.

== Results ==
External videos
- Mister Pilipinas Worldwide 2025 Finals
- Mister Pilipinas Coronation Night by PlayTime & Empire Philippines

Placements	Representatives	Titles	International placements	Ref.
Winners Top 7	Dumaguete Kenneth Cabungcal	Mister Pilipinas Supranational 2025	4th Runner-up Mister Supranational 2025	
Winners Top 7	Baguio Kirk Bondad	Mister Pilipinas International 2025	WINNER Mister International 2025	
Winners Top 7	Taguig Jether Palomo	Mister Pilipinas Global 2025	Top 11 Mister Global 2025	
Winners Top 7	Pampanga Raven Renz Lansangan	Mister Pilipinas Manhunt International 2025	Top 20 Manhunt International 2026	
Winners Top 7	San Juan Kitt Cortez	Mister Pilipinas Eco International 2025	2nd Runner-up Mister Eco International 2026	
Winners Top 7	Laguna Kenneth Rios Marcelino‡	Mister Pilipinas Cosmopolitan 2025	1st Runner-up Mister Cosmopolitan 2025	
Winners Top 7	Cebu City Michael Angelo Toledo	Mister Pilipinas Man of the Year 2025	2nd Runner-up Man of the Year 2025	
Top 15	Filipino Society in Alberta – Rufy Jag Guron § Antique – Joshua Daj Lawrence Filipino Society in Australia – Hamed Afshin Cabrera Marikina – Ivann Renz Enriquez Pasay – Aldreg Allen Alvarez Quezon City – Lorenzo Mari Bonoan Rizal – Nikko Nackaerts Zambales – Jasper Manalang ∆	—N/a	—N/a	

^∆ Automatically qualified for the top 15 finalists after winning the "Man of Fire: The Sexy & Dapper" award
^§ Automatically qualified for the top 15 finalists after winning the "Choicely Fan Vote"
^‡ Automatically qualified for the top 15 finalists after winning "Mister PlayTime"

International placements key
Winner
Finalist (T5)
Semifinalist
Non-Qualifiers
To Be Determined

=== Special awards ===
Awards	Delegate	Ref.
Fan Vote Winner	Filipino Society in Alberta Rufy Jag Fronda Guron	
Man of Fire: The Sexy & Dapper	Zambales Jasper Manalang	
Mister Abu	Quezon City Lorenzo Mari Bonoan	
Mister Arete	Baguio Kirk Bondad	
Mister Friendship	Filipino Society in Italy Giuseppe Aglianó	
Mister Glen's Magazine Boy (Mister Photogenic)	Pampanga Raven Renz Lansangan	
Mister Pablo Best in Runway	Dumaguete Kenneth Vincent Cabungcal	
Mister PlayTime	Laguna Kenneth Rios Marcelino	

== Contestants ==
Twenty-six contestants competed for the title.

Locality	Contestant	Age (Note: Ages at the time of the competition)	Hometown	Ref.
Filipino Society in Alberta	Rufy Jag Fronda Guron	22	Lloydminster	
Antique	Joshua Daj Lawrence	24	San Jose de Buenavista	
Filipino Society in Australia	Hamed Afshin Cabrera	24	Melbourne	
Baguio	Kirk Bondad	27	Baguio	
Bantayan Island	Kevin Jay Secoya	28	Bantayan	
Batangas	Mark Menard Reyes	25	Mataasnakahoy	
Binangonan	Justine Kirk Quiocho	23	Binangonan	
Butuan	Jacinth Ziff	22	Butuan	
Camarines Sur	Mark Wilson Laresma	25	Nabua	
Cebu City	Michael Angelo Toledo	25	Cebu City	
Dumaguete	Kenneth Vincent Cabungcal	25	Dumaguete	
Filipino Society in Italy	Giuseppe Aglianó	27	Syracuse	
Laguna	Kenneth Rios Marcelino	24	Cabuyao	
Marikina	Ivann Renz Enriquez	30	Marikina	
Pampanga	Raven Renz Lansangan	27	Mabalacat	
Pangasinan	Jerryzon Jasmin	31	Pozorrubio	
Parañaque	James Celeridad	27	Parañaque	
Pasay	Aldreg Allen Alvarez	28	Pasay	
Quezon City	Lorenzo Mari Bonoan	31	Quezon City	
Rizal	Nikko Nackaerts	27	Taytay	
San Juan	Kitt Cortez	23	San Juan	
Taguig	Jether Palomo	23	Taguig	
Tarlac	John Pearl Sablan	21	Concepcion	
Toledo	Larz Kent Dawson	23	Toledo	
Filipino Society in the United Kingdom	Michael Alfonso Carter	17	Romford	
Zambales	Jasper Manalang	23	Olongapo	
