= Misters of Nigeria =

Misters Of Nigeria
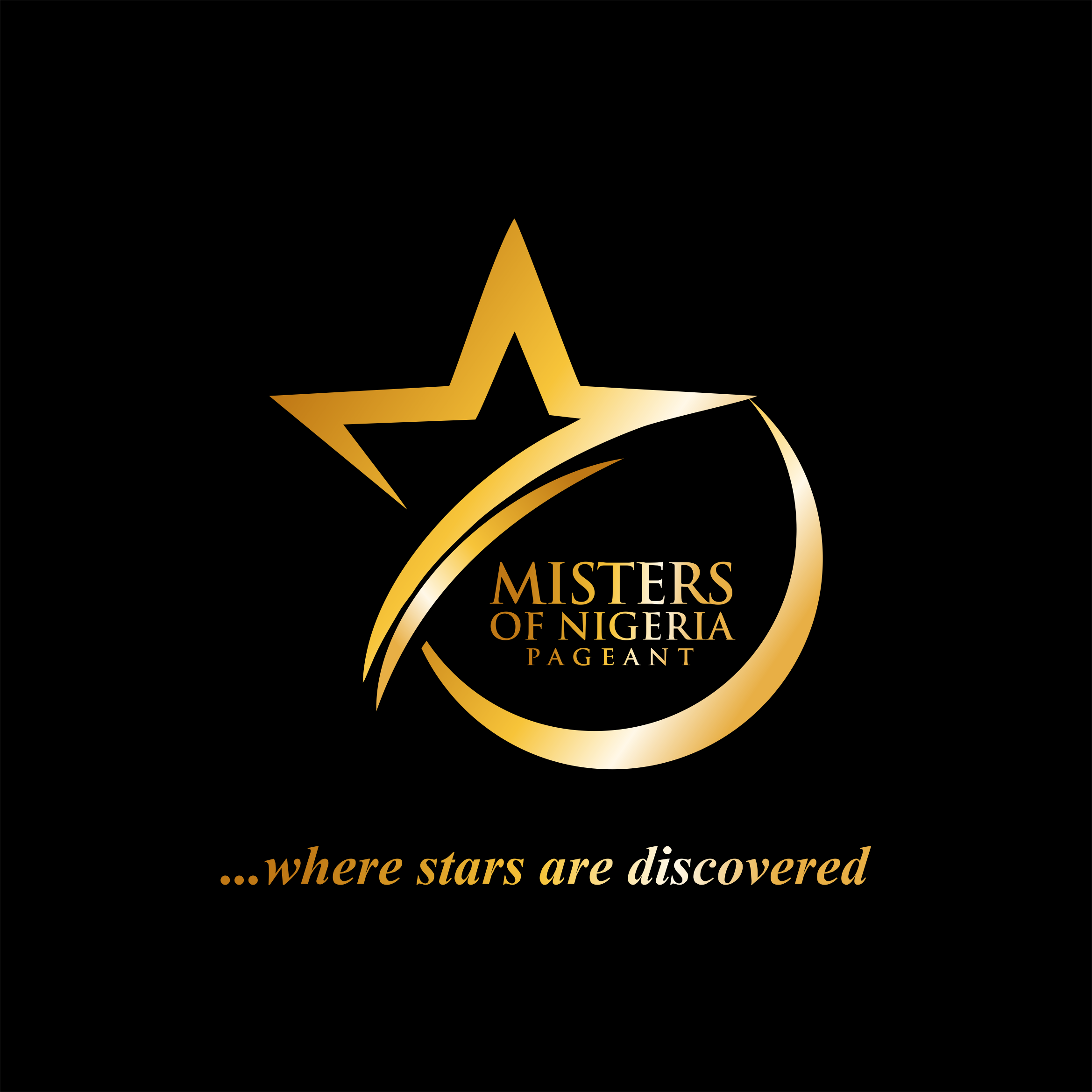
- Type: Male Pageant
- Parent organization: 97th Entertainment
- Headquarters: Lagos, Nigeria
- First edition: 2021; 5 years ago
- Most recent edition: 2026
- Current titleholder: Valentine Udemadu; Anambra State
- Language: English
- Website: Official Website

Misters of Nigeria (formerly known as Mister Model Nigeria) is a Nigerian male pageant based in Lagos, Nigeria that is aimed at developing young men into global leaders. It was created in 2020 by 97th entertainment. The pageant currently holds the franchise to some international pageants which includes Mister Global, Mister International, Manhunt International and Mister Model International. The Top 3 finalists of Misters of Nigeria go on to represent Nigeria in any of the above-mentioned competitions.

The current title holder of Misters of Nigeria is Valentine Udemadu, representing Anambra State at the 6th edition.

In 2024 Misters of Nigeria emerged best male pageant brand of the year at the Eko Heritage awards.

== Competition ==
The Misters of Nigeria competition begins with an open registration process, where applicants are shortlisted through interviews and other evaluative factors to determine the top 37 semi-finalists. These semi-finalists undergo a series of tasks designed to test various facets of their skills and abilities. Following each task, contestants face eliminations until a select number of finalists (usually ranging from 10 to 20) remains. These finalists then proceed to a camp for the final round of the competition, culminating in the grand finale where one contestant is ultimately crowned the winner.

As at 2024, the winner receives a grand prize valued at 7 million Naira and rights to represent Nigeria at any of the international pageants.

As at 2025, the winner got a grand prize valued at 12 million naira.

== History ==
Misters of Nigeria was officially created in 2020 and held its first edition in 2021 under the name Mister Model Nigeria. The maiden edition concluded with law graduate Okeke Marcel Soludo from Anambra State being crowned the winner.

Prior to the second edition, the pageant acquired two additional franchises, necessitating a name change to Misters of Nigeria to better reflect its expanded scope. Since then, the organization has crowned several young Men some of which have gone on to achieve remarkable accomplishments both nationally and internationally.

In 2024, Favour Ogbuokiri who was first runner-up at the Misters of Nigeria 2024, represented Nigeria and emerged as the 2nd Runner-up at Mister Global competition, held in Bangkok, Thailand. Making history as the highest placed Nigerian representative at the global event, with Favour breaking past records and setting a new one.

== Partnerships and collaborations ==
In 2023, the pageant partnered with 1XBET, Alpha Nobis Real Estate, and Folayemi Joshua Fashion. As part of these collaborations, 1XBET awarded a cash prize of ₦150,000 to the winner of their task, Alpha Nobis Real Estate granted the overall competition winner a plot of land, and Folayemi Joshua Fashion provided outfits for the contestants.

In 2025, the pageant partnered with MTN, luxury watch brand MAYBRANDS, energy drink brand Fearless, Nestlé, boutique fashion house 234byKiri, as well as Novatel Hotel, Lekki Conservation Center, Chi Limited, ProStar, Phil Royce, Pearls End Apartment, and Norté Media.

== Titleholders ==
Year	Winner	Runner(s) up					Ref.
2021	Okeke Soludo	Ireogbulam Christopher	Julius Spencer	Clinton Nnaji	Kelvin Nnaji	Christian Obidi	
2022	Shamsudeen Idris	Isinwa Senator	Amaechi Stanley	Olime Spencer	Wisdom Otormay	Inyiekwe Stanley	
2023	Oluwaseyifunmi Araga	Martin Osagie	Henri Keyz				
2024	Oluwatobi Adesanya	Nwajagu Samuel	Ogbuokiri Favour	Prosper Ndee	Samson Sunday Ukpong	Bright Pepple	
2025	Somto Nnoruga	Mbamara Bethel Chidera	Victor Ngoka	David Eyo	Chidi Udengwu	Godwin Awaji	
2026	Valentine Udemadu	Abure Ebosetale Gideon	Kelechi Chiazor Amonu-Jones	Ayeloja Samuel	Chidi-Nweloke Oscar	Alex Temitope Adetuwo	

== International level ==
=== Color keys ===
- : Declared as Winner
- : Ended as runner-up or Top 5/6 qualification
- : Ended as one of the Finalists
- : Ended as one of the Semi-finalists
- : Ended as special awards winner

=== Mister Global ===
Year	Representative's Name	State	Placement	Special Awards	Ref.
2021	Emmanuel Somto	Imo	Top 17	Mister Popularity	
2022	Isinwa Senator	Imo	Top 15	Mister Popularity	
2023	Oluwaseyifunmi Araga	Lagos	Top 15		
2024	Ogbuokiri Favour	Enugu	2nd Runner-up	Voice for Changes	
2025	Victor Ngoka	Zamfara	Top 10	Mister Popularity	
2026	Bethel Mbamara	Port Harcourt	1st Runner-up		

=== Mister International ===
Year	Representative's Name	State	Placement	Special Awards	Ref.
2022	Samuel Adebowale	Okene	Withdrew		
2023	Martin Osagie	Abuja	Unplaced		
2024	Nwajagu Samuel	Anambra	Mister International 2024	Best in Swimwear	
2025	Bethel Mbamara	Port Harcourt	3rd Runner-up	Mister International Africa	
2026	Abure Ebosetale	Edo	Top 10	Mister International Africa; Best in Swimwear; Mister Social Impact	

=== Manhunt International ===
Year	Representative's Name	State	Placement	Special Awards	Ref.
2022	Iroegbulam Christopher	Imo	Top 15		
2024	Henri Keyz	Abuja	Withdrew		
2025	Somto Nnoruga	Abia	8th Runner-up	Best African Model	
2026	Ayeloja Samuel	Kwara	3rd Runner-up	Manhunt Africa; Best African Model; Best Fashion Model	

=== Mister Cosmopolitan ===
Year	Representative's Name	State	Placement	Special Awards	Ref.
2025	Godwin Awaji-Iroso	Rivers	Top 10	Mister Cosmopolitan Africa; Best Physique; Best in Formal Wear	

=== Mister Universe ===
Year	Representative's Name	State	Placement	Special Awards	Ref.
2026	Chidi Beajamin	Abuja	TBD		

== State competition ==
List of Misters of Nigeria State Competitions
State	Debut	Organizers	State title	Ref.
Akwa Ibom State	2024	Staunch Entertainment	Misters of Akwa Ibom	
Cross River State	2023	Mr Cross River Organization	Mr Cross River	
Enugu State	2022	Princeglam Empire	Mr UNN	
Imo State	2022	Slam Affairs	Mr IMSU	
Rivers State	2024	BCB Entertainment	Misters of Rivers	

=== Awards and nominations ===
Award	Year	Category	Results	Ref(s)
Eko Heritage Awards	2024	Best Male Pageant Brand of the Year	Won	

== See also ==
- Mr Nigeria
