= Mister Pilipinas Worldwide 2026 =

Mister Pilipinas Worldwide
- Date: April 15, 2026
- Presenters: Gabbi Carballo; Kitt Cortez
- Venue: Bigger Pictures, Mandaluyong, Metro Manila
- Broadcaster: PlayTime (online streaming via YouTube)
- Entrants: 20
- Placements: 11
- Congeniality: Ronald Boorman (Southern Leyte)
- Photogenic: Christian Joshua Villones (Laguna)

The Mister Pilipinas Worldwide 2026 was the fourth edition of the Mister Pilipinas Worldwide pageant, held on April 15, 2026 at Bigger Pictures in Mandaluyong. The Mister Pilipinas Worldwide 2025 winners subsequently passed on their titles to their respective successors at the end of the event.

The competition is slated to select the Philippines' representatives to various international male pageants, including Mister Supranational, Mister International, Mister Global, Manhunt International, Mister Cosmo, Mister Eco International, Mister Cosmopolitan, and Mister Worldwide.

== Results ==
External videos
- Mister Pilipinas Worldwide 2026 Finals
- Mister Pilipinas Coronation Night by PlayTime & Empire Philippines

Placements	Representatives	Titles	International placements	Ref.
Winners Top 8	Manila (Filipino Society in California) Felipe Bayani Marasigan	Mister Pilipinas Supranational 2026	Top 20 Mister Supranational 2026	
Winners Top 8	Calamba, Laguna (Filipino Society in Italy) John Wayne Alba	Mister Pilipinas International 2026	Top 10 Mister International 2026	
Winners Top 8	Parañaque Myron Jude Ordillano	Mister Pilipinas Global 2026	2nd Runner-up Mister Global 2026	
Winners Top 8	Tarlac John Paul Gundayao ∆	Mister Pilipinas Manhunt International 2026	TBD Manhunt International 2027	
Winners Top 8	Quezon City Lorenzo Mari Bonoan	Mister Pilipinas Cosmo 2026	TBD Mister Cosmo 2026	
Winners Top 8	Malolos, Bulacan Godfrey Nikolai Murillo	Mister Pilipinas Eco International 2026	TBD Mister Eco International 2027	
Winners Top 8	Macabebe, Pampanga John Eriq Bonifacio	Mister Pilipinas Cosmopolitan 2026	WINNER Mister Cosmopolitan 2026	
Winners Top 8	Mandaluyong (Filipino Society in Australia) Jason Romeo Lopez	Mister Pilipinas Worldwide 2026	TBD Mister Worldwide 2027	
Runners-up Top 11	Taguig (Filipino Society in Montana) Zach Russell	1st Runner-Up	—N/a	
Runners-up Top 11	Cebu City Gian Antonio Guidicelli	2nd Runner-Up	—N/a	
Runners-up Top 11	Laguna Christian Joshua Villones	3rd Runner-Up	—N/a	

^∆ Automatically qualified for the top 11 finalists after winning the "Fan Vote"

International placements key
Winner
Finalist (T5)
Semifinalist
Non-Qualifiers
To Be Determined

=== Special awards ===
Awards	Delegate	Ref.
Fan Vote Winner	Malolos, Bulacan Godfrey Nikolai Murillo	
Face of Nix Institute of Beauty	Parañaque Myron Jude Ordillano	
Mister Clevr	Parañaque Myron Jude Ordillano	
Mister Playtime	Parañaque Myron Jude Ordillano	
Mister Abu	Macabebe, Pampanga John Eriq Bonifacio	
Mister Congeniality	Southern Leyte Ronald Boorman	
Mister Glen's Magazine Boy (Mister Photogenic)	Laguna Christian Joshua Villones	
Mister Surge	Calamba, Laguna John Wayne Alba	
Mister Hotel 101	Calamba, Laguna John Wayne Alba	

== Contestants ==
The following contestants will be competing for the titles.

Locality (Note: A total of 7 contestants qualified for the national competition through pageants held in Overseas Filipino Societies. They were required to represent a Philippine locality at the same time. Their chosen localities are listed first, followed by their overseas society in parentheses.)	Contestant	Age (Note: Ages at the time of the competition)	Hometown
Angeles	Aian Santos	30	Angeles
Bacolod (Filipino Society in the United Kingdom)	Red Neal Arceo	—	Manchester
Batangas	Rirrucham Kashyap	27	Batangas City
Bicol (Filipino Society in West Asia)	Gene Paulo Cabezudo	33	Riyadh
Calamba, Laguna (Filipino Society in Italy)	John Wayne Alba	22	Milan
Cebu City	Gian Antonio Guidicelli	25	Cebu City
Laguna	Christian Joshua Villones	28	Santa Rosa
Mabalacat	Krishna Yasser Rodriguez	27	Mabalacat
Macabebe	John Eriq Bonifacio	27	Macabebe
Malolos	Godfrey Nikolai Murillo	23	Malolos
Mandaluyong (Filipino Society in Australia)	Jason Romeo Lopez	27	Sydney
Manila (Filipino Society in California)	Felipe Bayani Marasigan	27	Fremont
Pangasinan	Rodniel John Soriano	24	Binalonan
Parañaque	Myron Jude Ordillano	27	Parañaque
Quezon	Brylle Villena	35	Lucena
Quezon City	Lorenzo Mari Bonoan	31	Quezon City
San Jose del Monte	Jesus Guinto	27	San Jose del Monte
Southern Leyte (Filipino Society in Canada)	Ronald Boorman	23	Regina
Taguig (Filipino Society in Montana)	Zach Russell	23	Red Lodge
Tarlac	John Paul Gundayao	22	Paniqui

== See also ==
- Mister Pilipinas Worldwide
- Mister Pilipinas Worldwide 2025
