= Mister Pilipinas Worldwide second edition =

Mister Pilipinas Worldwide
- Mall of Asia Arena, the venue of the pageant
- Date: October 24, 2023
- Presenters: Beatrice Gomez; Annabelle McDonnell
- Entertainment: Sam Concepcion
- Venue: Mall of Asia Arena, Pasay, Philippines
- Broadcaster: Empire.ph (online streaming via YouTube)
- Entrants: 16
- Placements: 10
- Winner: Brandon Espiritu; Filipino Community in Guam

The Mister Pilipinas Worldwide 2023, held as part of The Filipino Festival event, was the second edition of the Mister Pilipinas Worldwide pageant organized to select Filipino representatives for 2024 international male pageants. It was held on October 24, 2023, at the Mall of Asia Arena in Pasay. This followed the inaugural pageant organized on May 6, 2023.

The Miss Philippines 2023 pageant, was also part of The Filipino Festival event.

Brandon Espiritu from the Filipino Community in Guam was crowned as the winner, succeeding Johannes Rissler.

== Background ==
External videos
- Mister Pilipinas Worldwide 2023 (and The Miss Philippines 2023) Finals
- The Filipino Festival Awards Night. The Miss Philippines & Mister Pilipinas Worldwide Finals. by Empire Philippines

=== Qualification for international pageants ===
Mister Pilipinas Worldwide 2023 will determine the representative of the Philippines for the Mister Supranational, Mister International, Mister Global, Manhunt International, Mister Cosmopolitan, and Man of the Year.

=== Host and performers ===
Beatrice Luigi Gomez and Annabelle McDonnell hosted the Mister Pilipinas Worldwide 2023 pageant. Prior to the start of the competition proper, Sam Concepcion performed his single "Otomatika" and was joined by the Mister Pilipinas Worldwide 2023 and The Miss Philippines 2023 delegates.

Mister International 2023 Thitisan Goodburn of Thailand and Miss Supranational 2023 Andrea Aguilera of Ecuador were also present as a guest.

=== Format ===
An online poll was also opened with the results accounting for 50 percent of the contestants' final score.

== Results ==
Following the coronation, The Mister Philippines and the finalists were appointed in a separate ceremony held on February 18, 2024, to represent the Philippines in their respective pageants.

Placements	Representatives	Titles	International placements	Ref.
The Mister Philippines	Filipino Society in Guam Brandon Espiritu	Mister Pilipinas Supranational 2024	2nd Runner-up Mister Supranational 2024	
Top 6	Tacloban Justine Ong	Mister Pilipinas International 2024	Top 6 Mister International 2024	
Top 6	Filipino Society in California Daumier Corilla	Mister Pilipinas Global 2024	WINNER Mister Global 2024	
Top 6	Bulacan Jordan San Juan	Mister Pilipinas Manhunt International 2024	3rd Runner-up Manhunt International 2025	
Top 6	Tarlac Emerson Gomez	Mister Pilipinas Cosmopolitan 2024	Top 10 Mister Cosmopolitan 2024	
Top 6	Filipino Society in the United Kingdom Anthony Cunningham	Mister Pilipinas Man of the Year 2024	Top 13 Man of the Year 2024	
Top 10	Cebu City – Lorenzo Isip General Santos – Jupheter Franco Filipino Society in New Zealand – Aaron Beau Davis Pangasinan – John Peterson Sanchez	—N/a	—N/a	

International placements key
Winner
Finalist (T5)
Semifinalist
Non-Qualifiers
To Be Determined

=== Special awards ===
Awards	Delegate	Ref.
Mister Fairy Skin	Filipino Society in California Daumier Corilla	
Mister Great Lengths	Filipino Society in Guam Brandon Espiritu	
Mister Kemans	Tacloban Justine Ong	
People's Choice Awardee	Pangasinan John Peterson Sanchez	

== Contestants ==
Sixteen contestants competed for the title. The entrants underwent a screening process. They had to be from 18 and 35 years old and not shorter than 5 ft 8 in (1.73 m) The pageant was also open to men who are married and/or have children.

Locality	Contestant
Bataan	Arthur Joseph Reyes
Bohol	Kenneth Luke Hutchinson
Bulacan	Jordan San Juan
Filipino Society in California	Daumier Corilla
Cebu City	Lorenzo Isip
Dagupan	Alex Herberich
Davao del Norte	Antonio Dujali
General Santos	Jupheter Franco
Filipino Society in Guam	Brandon Espiritu
Filipino Society in Italy	Jeffrey Ilagan
Filipino Society in New Zealand	Aaron Beau Davis
Pangasinan	John Peterson Sanchez
Parañaque	Emmanuel Macoy Jimenez
Tacloban	Justine Ong
Tarlac	Emerson Gomez
Filipino Society in the United Kingdom	Anthony Cunningham
