= Mister Philippines =

Mister Philippines may refer to:

- Mister World Philippines, a male pageant that selects the Philippines' representative to Mister World.
- Mister Pilipinas Worldwide, a male pageant that selects the Philippines' representative to Mister Supranational, Manhunt International, Mister Global, Mister International and Mister Cosmopolitan
- Misters of Filipinas, a male pageant that selects the Philippines' representative to Man of the World, Model Worldwide, Super Globe, Man Hot Star, Fitness Model World, and Mister Tourism & Culture Universe
