= Somto Nnoruga =

Nigerian model and pageant titleholder

- Born: Somto Alexander Nnoruga; Anambra, Nigeria
- Occupations: model; interior designer
- Beauty pageant titleholder
- Title: Misters of Nigeria 2025; Best African Model
- Major competitions: Misters of Nigeria 2025; (Winner); Manhunt International 2025; (8th Runner-up); (Best African Model)

Somto Alexander Nnoruga is a Nigerian model and pageant titleholder who was crowned Mister Nigeria 2025 at the Misters of Nigeria competition on 11 May 2025 in Lagos, Nigeria. He is Nigeria’s representative at the Manhunt International 2025 competition.

== Early life and background ==
Nnoruga was born and raised in Isuofia in Aguata LGA, Anambra State, he is the last-born and only son in a family of five.

His modelling journey began at a young age with BETH Modelling Agency Nigeria, where he was introduced to the world of fashion and high-end visuals. He has worked with major brands, including Tecno Mobile and Octa FX. Nnoruga is also an interior designer with his own business, he founded Bougie Interiors and Apartments and is an aspiring professional footballer.

== Pageantry ==
Nnoruga represented Abia State at the fifth edition of the Misters of Nigeria competition, held on Sunday, 11 May 2025, at the Muson Centre in Onikan, Lagos. He competed alongside 36 other contestants representing the 36 states of Nigeria and the FCT. In the end, he was crowned Mister of Nigeria 2025 by the outgoing Mister Global Nigeria, Favour Ogbuokiri, and Mister International 2024, Nwajagu Chinemerem Samuel.

The win qualified him to represent Nigeria at Manhunt International 2025 in Thailand, where he will compete alongside 30 other delegates from 30 countries.
