= Mister Pilipinas Worldwide =

National beauty pageant in the Philippines

- Type: Men's beauty pageant
- Franchise holder: Empire Philippines
- Headquarters: Bonifacio Global City, Taguig, Metro Manila, Philippines
- Country represented: Philippines (Note: The pageant includes Filipino diaspora)
- Qualifies for: 8 (see Titles)
- First edition: 2023
- Most recent edition: 2026
- President: Dom Corilla
- Vice President for Training & Development: Joshua de Sequera
- Vice President for Creatives & Marketing: Kenneth Cabungcal
- Language: Filipino; English
- Website: misterpilipinasworldwide.com

Mister Pilipinas Worldwide (commonly abbreviated as MPW) is a male beauty pageant and organization that selects the Philippines' official representatives to major international pageants such as Mister Supranational, Mister International, Mister Global, and Manhunt International, and other international competitions such as Mister Cosmo, Mister Eco International, Mister Worldwide, and Mister Cosmopolitan.

== History ==
Empire Philippines, franchise owner of Miss Universe Philippines, launched Mister Pilipinas Worldwide (MPW), holding its inaugural edition on May 6, 2023. Empire intended the MPW as a consolidation of three pageants—Mister Supranational Philippines, Mister Global Philippines, and Manhunt International Philippines, doing away with the need to hold separate pageants to determine the Philippine representatives to the international counterparts of the three competitions. The pageant would also serve as a qualifier for other international competitions whose franchises have been acquired by Empire Philippines and the MPW organization.

Dom Corilla's win as Mister Global 2024 marks the Philippines' first international title under the Mister Pilipinas Worldwide Organization. It was followed by Kirk Bondad's victory as Mister International 2025 the following year after. In 2026, John Eriq Bonifacio clinched the Philippines' first Mister Cosmopolitan title.

The organization is under the leadership of Dom Corilla, Mister Global 2024; Joshua de Sequera, Manhunt International 2022 1st Runner-Up; and Kenneth Cabungcal, Mister Supranational 2025 4th Runner-Up.

== Titles ==
Note that the year designates the time Mister Pilipinas Worldwide acquired a particular international male pageant franchise.

Current Franchise
Titles	Year	No. of Wins
Mister Supranational	2023 — Present	0
Mister International	2023 — Present	1 (2025)
Mister Global	2023 — Present	1 (2024)
Manhunt International	2023 — Present	0
Mister Cosmopolitan	2023 — Present	1 (2026)
Mister Eco International	2025 — Present	0
Mister Cosmo	2026 — Present	0
Mister Worldwide	2026 — Present	0
Former Franchise
Titles	Year	No. of Wins
Man of the Year	2024 — 2025	0

== Editions ==
Below is the complete list of Mister Pilipinas Worldwide editions.

Edition	Date	Presenters	Entrants	Finals venue
1st	May 6, 2023	Annabelle Mae McDonnell; Ralph de Leon	19	Okada Manila, Parañaque
2nd	October 24, 2023	Beatrice Gomez; André Brouillette	16	SM Mall of Asia Arena, Pasay
3rd	April 26, 2025	Pauline AmeIincx	26	Newport Performing Arts Theater, Pasay
4th	April 15, 2026	Gabbi Carballo; Kitt Cortez	20	Bigger Pictures, Mandaluyong

=== Titleholders ===
Edition	Current Titles								Ref.
Edition	Mister Pilipinas Supranational	Mister Pilipinas International	Mister Pilipinas Global	Mister Pilipinas Manhunt International	Mister Pilipinas Cosmopolitan	Mister Pilipinas Eco International	Mister Pilipinas Cosmo	Mister Pilipinas Worldwide	Ref.
1st	Johannes Rissler; Davao del Norte	Jefferson Bunney; Filipino Society in the United Kingdom	John Ernest Tanting; Cebu City	Kenneth Stromsnes; Mandaluyong	Ivan Aikon Ignacio; San Jose, Nueva Ecija	Additional acquired franchise	Additional acquired franchise	Additional acquired franchise	
2nd	Brandon Espiritu^{1} Filipino Society in Guam	Justine Ong; Tacloban	Daumier Corilla; Filipino Society in California	Jordan San Juan; Bulacan	Emerson Gomez; Tarlac	Additional acquired franchise	Additional acquired franchise	Additional acquired franchise	
3rd	Kenneth Vincent Cabungcal; Dumaguete	Kirk Bondad; Baguio	Jether Palomo; Taguig	Raven Renz Lansangan; Pampanga	Kenneth Rios Marcelino; Laguna	Kitt Cortez; San Juan	Additional acquired franchise	Additional acquired franchise	
4th	Felipe Bayani Marasigan; Manila (Filipino Society in California)	John Wayne Alba; Calamba, Laguna (Filipino Society in Italy)	Myron Jude Ordillano; Parañaque	John Paul Gundayao; Tarlac	John Eriq Bonifacio; Macabebe, Pampanga	Godfrey Nikolai Murillo; Malolos, Bulacan	Lorenzo Mari Bonoan; Quezon City	Jason Romeo Lopez; Mandaluyong (Filipino Society in Australia)	

Notes:

- ^1 Also awarded "The Mister Philippines" title.

== Placements ==
The following is the placement of Mister Pilipinas Worldwide titleholders in international pageants.

=== Current titles ===
Mister Supranational

Year	Delegate	Age^{[α]}	Hometown	Competition performance		Ref.
Year	Delegate	Age^{[α]}	Hometown	Placements	Other award(s)	Ref.
2023	Johannes Rissler	24	Panabo	Top 20		
2024	Brandon Espiritu	29	Dededo	2nd Runner-Up	Mister Influencer	
2025	Kenneth Cabungcal	25	Dumaguete	4th Runner-Up		
2026	Felipe Bayani Marasigan	27	Manila	Top 20		

Mister International

Year	Delegate	Age^{[α]}	Hometown	Competition performance		Ref.
Year	Delegate	Age^{[α]}	Hometown	Placements	Other award(s)	Ref.
2023	Jefferson Bunney	28	London	Top 10	Most Attractive Men	
2024	Justine Carl Ong	23	Tacloban	Top 6	Best National Costume; Fan Vote Winner	
2025	Kirk Bondad	28	Baguio	Mister International 2025	Dr. Face Choice	
2026	John Wayne Alba	22	Calamba	Top 10		

Mister Global

Year	Delegate	Age^{[α]}	Hometown	Competition performance		Ref.
Year	Delegate	Age^{[α]}	Hometown	Placements	Other award(s)	Ref.
2023	John Ernest Tanting	23	Cebu City	Top 15	Defet Award	
2024	Daumier Corilla	29	Los Angeles	Mister Global 2024		
2025	Jether Palomo	23	Taguig	Top 11	Best Country Presentation Video	
2026	Myron Jude Ordillano	27	Parañaque	2nd Runner-Up	Mister Congeniality; V Square Clinic Global Icon	

Mister Cosmopolitan

Year	Delegate	Age^{[α]}	Hometown	Competition performance		Ref.
Year	Delegate	Age^{[α]}	Hometown	Placements	Other award(s)	Ref.
2023	Ivan Aikon Ignacio	22	San Jose	2nd Runner-Up		
2024	Emerson Gomez	22	Bamban	Top 10	Best in Formal Wear; Mister Kraam; Mister PSM	
2025	Kenneth Rios Marcelino	25	Cabuyao	1st Runner-Up	Best National Costume; Mister Photogenic	
2026	John Eriq Bonifacio	27	Macabebe	Mister Cosmopolitan 2026		

Manhunt International

Year	Delegate	Age^{[α]}	Hometown	Competition performance		Ref.
Year	Delegate	Age^{[α]}	Hometown	Placements	Other award(s)	Ref.
2024	Kenneth Stromsnes	23	Mandaluyong	2nd Runner-Up	Best Personality	
2025	Jordan San Juan	23	Bocaue	3rd Runner-Up		
2026	Raven Renz Lansangan	27	Mabalacat	Top 20		
2027	John Paul Gundayao	22	Paniqui			

Mister Cosmo

Year	Delegate	Age^{[α]}	Hometown	Competition performance		Ref.
Year	Delegate	Age^{[α]}	Hometown	Placements	Other award(s)	Ref.
2026	Lorenzo Mari Bonoan	31	Quezon City			

Mister Eco International

Year	Delegate	Age^{[α]}	Hometown	Competition performance		Ref.
Year	Delegate	Age^{[α]}	Hometown	Placements	Other award(s)	Ref.
2026	Kitt Cortez	25	San Juan	2nd Runner-Up	Mister Eco Asia	
2027	Godfrey Nikolai Murillo	23	Malolos			

Mister Worldwide

Year	Delegate	Age^{[α]}	Hometown	Competition performance		Ref.
Year	Delegate	Age^{[α]}	Hometown	Placements	Other award(s)	Ref.
2027	Jason Romeo Lopez	27	Mandaluyong			

=== Former titles ===
Man of the Year

Year	Delegate	Age^{[α]}	Hometown	Competition performance		Ref.
Year	Delegate	Age^{[α]}	Hometown	Placements	Other award(s)	Ref.
2024	Anthony Cunningham	26	London	Top 13		
2025	Michael Angelo Toledo	25	Cebu City	2nd Runner-Up		

Note:
- ^α Age at the time of the international pageant

== See also ==
- Mister World Philippines
- Manhunt International Philippines
- The Miss Philippines
- List of beauty pageants
