= Mister Pilipinas Worldwide first edition =

Mister Pilipinas Worldwide
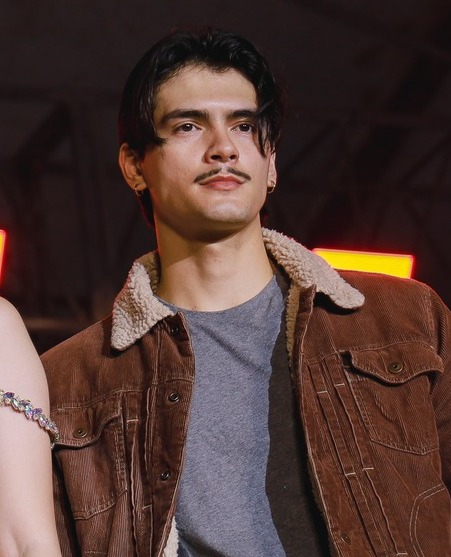
- Johannes Rissler
- Date: May 6, 2023
- Presenters: Ralph de Leon
- Venue: Okada Manila, Parañaque
- Entrants: 19
- Placements: 8
- Winner: Johannes Rissler; Davao del Norte

The inaugural Mister Pilipinas Worldwide was held on May 6, 2023 at the Cove Manila pool club of Okada Manila in Parañaque.

Johannes Rissler from Davao del Norte was crowned as the country’s representative to Mister Supranational 2023. A second pageant in October was held to select the country's representatives for the next year's international pageants.

== Results ==
Placements	Representatives	Titles	International placements	Ref.
Winners Top 5	Davao del Norte Johannes Rissler	Mister Pilipinas Supranational 2023	Top 20 Mister Supranational 2023	
Winners Top 5	Filipino Society in the United Kingdom Jefferson Bunney	Mister Pilipinas International 2023	Top 10 Mister International 2023	
Winners Top 5	Cebu City John Ernest Tanting	Mister Pilipinas Global 2023	Top 15 Mister Global 2023	
Winners Top 5	Mandaluyong Kenneth Stromsnes	Mister Pilipinas Manhunt International 2023	2nd Runner-up Manhunt International 2024	
Winners Top 5	San Jose, Nueva Ecija Ivan Ignacio	Mister Pilipinas Cosmopolitan 2023	2nd Runner-up Mister Cosmopolitan 2023	
Runners-up Top 8	Cebu Lorenzo Isip	1st Runner-Up	—N/a	
Runners-up Top 8	Bulacan Rei Aldrich Gregorio	2nd Runner-Up	—N/a	
Runners-up Top 8	Filipino Society in the United States Tyler Gaumer	3rd Runner-Up	—N/a	

International placements key
Winner
Finalist (T5)
Semifinalist
Non-Qualifiers
To Be Determined

== Contestants ==
Nineteen contestants competed for the title.

Locality	Contestant
Bohol	Joseph Pesay Valler
Bulacan	Rei Aldrich Gregorio
Cavite	Gilmer Galaros
Camarines Sur	Kenneth Estopace
Cebu	Lorenzo Isip
Cebu City	John Ernest Tanting
Dipolog	Oliver Dalman
Davao del Norte	Johannes Rissler
Ilocos Sur	Karl Maristela
Laguna	Gion Layug
Naga	Joshua Dinio
Nueva Ecija	Adam Apostol
Mandaluyong	Ken Stromsnes
Pampanga	Adrian Paulo Araneta
Rizal	Drigo Francia
San Jose	Ivan Aikon Ignacio
Sorsogon	Christian Annipot
Filipino Society in the United Kingdom	Jefferson Bunney
Filipino Society in the United States	Tyler Gaumer
