= GBSB Global Business School =

Business school in Spain

- Type: Business School
- Headquarters: Malta, Barcelona, Madrid, Spain
- Website: https://www.global-business-school.org

GBSB Global Business School is a private institution of higher education with campuses in Barcelona and Madrid (Spain), Birkirkara (Malta), and a virtual, online campus. This business school holds international accreditations.

== Academic programs ==
GBSB Global Business School offers programs ranging from Foundation to Ph.D., all taught in English. The curricula combine academic theory with practical application and focus on innovation, digital transformation, sustainability, ethics, and entrepreneurial leadership.

Among its principal degree programs are the Bachelor of Business Administration and Digital Innovation, which offers 12 specialized tracks; the Master in Management (MiM), available with 17 specializations; and the Master of Business Administration (MBA). These programs have been designed to give students an international education and prepare them for roles in global business contexts. Specializations include fields such as Artificial Intelligence for Management and Enterprise Cybersecurity Management, reflecting current developments in business and technology.

== Accreditations ==
GBSB Global Business School is fully licensed and all its programs are accredited by the Malta Further & Higher Education Authority (MFHEA), making them officially recognized within the European Union and internationally.

GBSB Global Business School is included in the Registro de Universidades, Centros y Títulos (RUCT), the official registry maintained by the Spanish Ministry of Universities and the definitive reference for recognized universities, academic centers, and degrees within the Spanish higher education system.

GBSB Global's inclusion in the Registro de Universidades, Centros y Títulos (RUCT) enables the Barcelona Campus to offer its Bachelor of Business Administration and Digital Innovation program (180 ECTS) and its Master of Science in Management program (90 ECTS), both of which are awarded under the Maltese higher education system.

The School is also authorized by the Department of Education, Science, and Universities(Consejería de Educación, Ciencia y Universidades) of the Madrid Regional Government to deliver Undergraduate Higher Diploma in Business Administration and Digital Innovation (120 ECTS, EQF/ MQF Level 5) at its Madrid campus.

Internationally, GBSB Global Business School is accredited by the Accreditation Service for International Schools, Colleges and Universities (ASIC) and listed in its international directory as a "Premier" institution.^{1]} It is also accredited by the Accreditation Council for Business Schools and Programs (ACBSP).^{2]} The School is a member of The Association to Advance Collegiate Schools of Business (AACSB)^{[3]} and a member of The Business Graduates Association (BGA), an international membership and quality assurance body of world-leading, high-potential business schools that share a commitment for responsible management practices and lifelong learning.

== Rankings ==
GBSB Global Business School holds a 5-star rating by the Quacquarelli Symonds University Rating. Following a comprehensive analysis of GBSB Global’s performance metrics and independent data collection in accordance with the QS Stars™ methodology, the School have maintained the Five Star rating for four consecutive years. In the QS 2026 Rankings, it was placed among the top 10 business schools in Spain.

GBSB Global Business School has been recognized among the Best Business Schools in Spain by Forbes España 2026. Published by on June 11, 2026, the annual list highlights leading business schools and programs for students, young professionals, executives, and future business leaders seeking high-quality, career-oriented education. In this year’s edition, GBSB Global earned recognition across four major categories, underscoring the strength, relevance, and international positioning of its academic portfolio. Furthermore, Forbes España included GBSB Global among the top business schools offering AI training for executives.

In 2026, the Spanish Consumers Association (Asescon) has ranked GBSB Global Business School first in a new classification identifying the business schools in Spain that best respond to the current challenges of business education. The classification, published by Europa Press, El Economista, and Diario Economía, aims to provide students, families, and professionals with an updated view of institutions adapting most effectively to the demands of the labor market and digital economy.

Always in 2026, the Spanish personal-finance website Rankia included GBSB Global in its guide to online universities and business schools in Spain, describing it as an option for students intending to work outside Spain because its programs are taught in English and it holds international accreditation and has a presence in Malta.

In the very same year, the World Luxury Chamber of Commerce (WLCC) has included GBSB Global Business School in TOP Luxury Business Education 2026, its inaugural selection of universities and business schools recognized for the strength and relevance of their luxury-focused programs. Announced on September 16, 2026, the selection weighs criteria such as program relevance, academic quality, and industry connections.

In 2025, GBSB Global is ranked Tier One in the CEO Magazine Global MBA Rankings, alongside some of the best names in business education from around the world.

GBSB Global Business School has been awarded the Palme d’Excellence for Strong Local Influence by the Eduniversal International Scientific Committee and has been ranked among the “1,000 Best Business Schools” in the world, representing Spain among the top 25 business schools in the country. In 2024, Eduniversal ranked the Master of Arts in Fashion and Luxury Business Management program at GBSB Global among the Top-40 best Masters programs in the field of Luxury Management in the world and as the # 1 program in Spain.

GBSB Global Business School is Microsoft Showcase School, a recognition granted to institutions that integrate digital technologies in teaching and learning.

In 2024, the school was included in the Forbes list of the Best Business Schools in Spain, in The Financial Magazine national rankings, and in El Mundo’s Masters 2024 ranking, which listed GBSB Global’s Master in Communications and Marketing among the top five marketing master’s programs in Spain.

== Partnerships ==
GBSB Global Business School participates in the Erasmus Programme for student and staff mobility and for involvement in Erasmus-funded projects. Through this framework, the school engages with the European Education Area and the Digital Education Action Plan 2021–2027.

The institution offers a Master of Science in Operations and Supply Chain Management in collaboration with the Zaragoza Logistics Center (ZLC), part of the MIT Global Scale Network. The Zaragoza Logistics Center was founded in 2003 by the Government of Aragon, the Massachusetts Institute of Technology, and the University of Zaragoza.

GBSB Global is an official partner of the University of Northampton (UON) in the United Kingdom. The partnership covers areas such as degree delivery, research, and entrepreneurship initiatives.

In addition, GBSB Global has a partnership with the Project Management Institute (PMI), a U.S.-based not-for-profit professional organization. Through PMI’s Project Management Ready Certification, students gain exposure to methodologies including traditional plan-based approaches, agile frameworks, and business analyst practices.

== History ==
Founded in 2005 in Barcelona, GBSB Global Business School emerged from a collective of education and management researchers. In 2014, GBSB inaugurated its first dedicated campus in Barcelona and began earning recognition for its focus on innovation in business education. Notable achievements include a division win at the International Business Ethics Case Competition, participation in the European Development Days 2013 and partnerships with major organizations like Microsoft, which named it Spain’s first Microsoft Showcase School. Expansion continued with the launch of a Madrid campus in 2017.

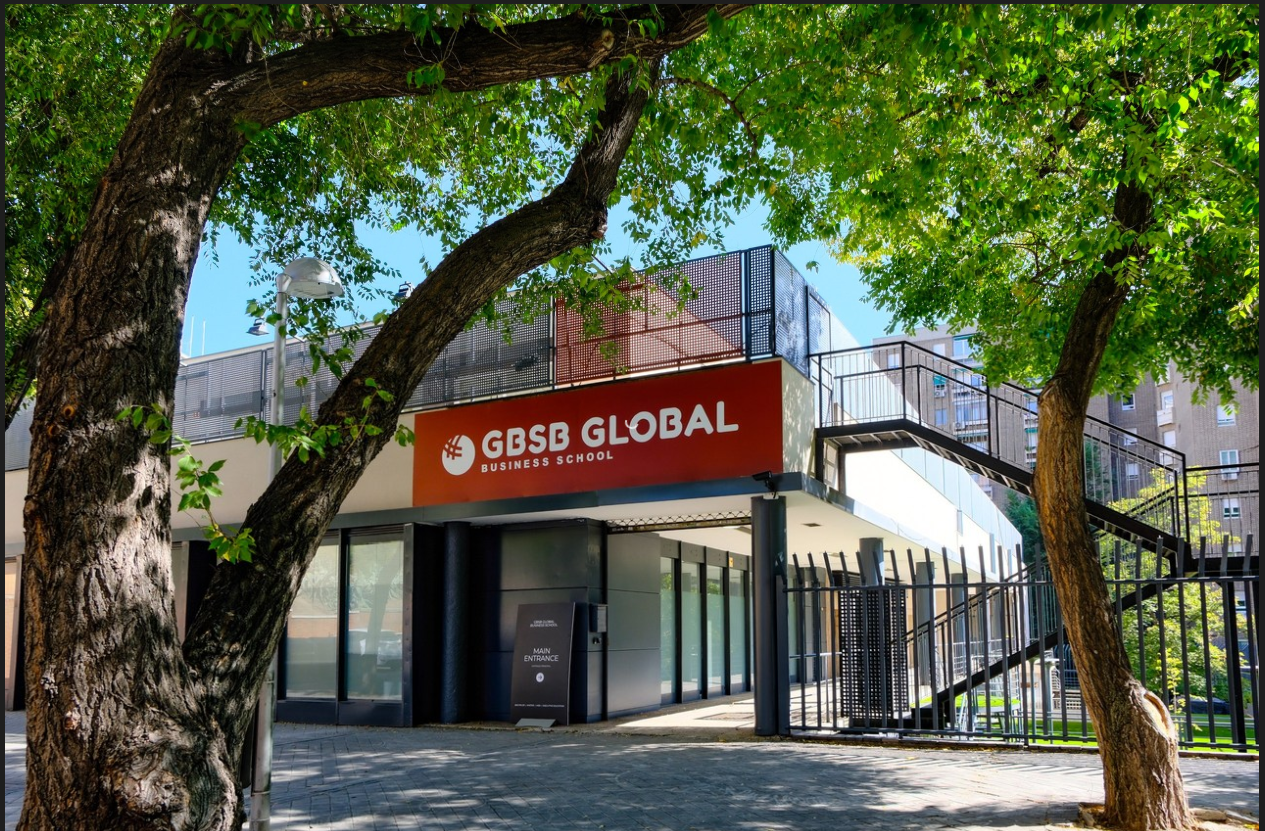
GBSB Global Campus in Madrid

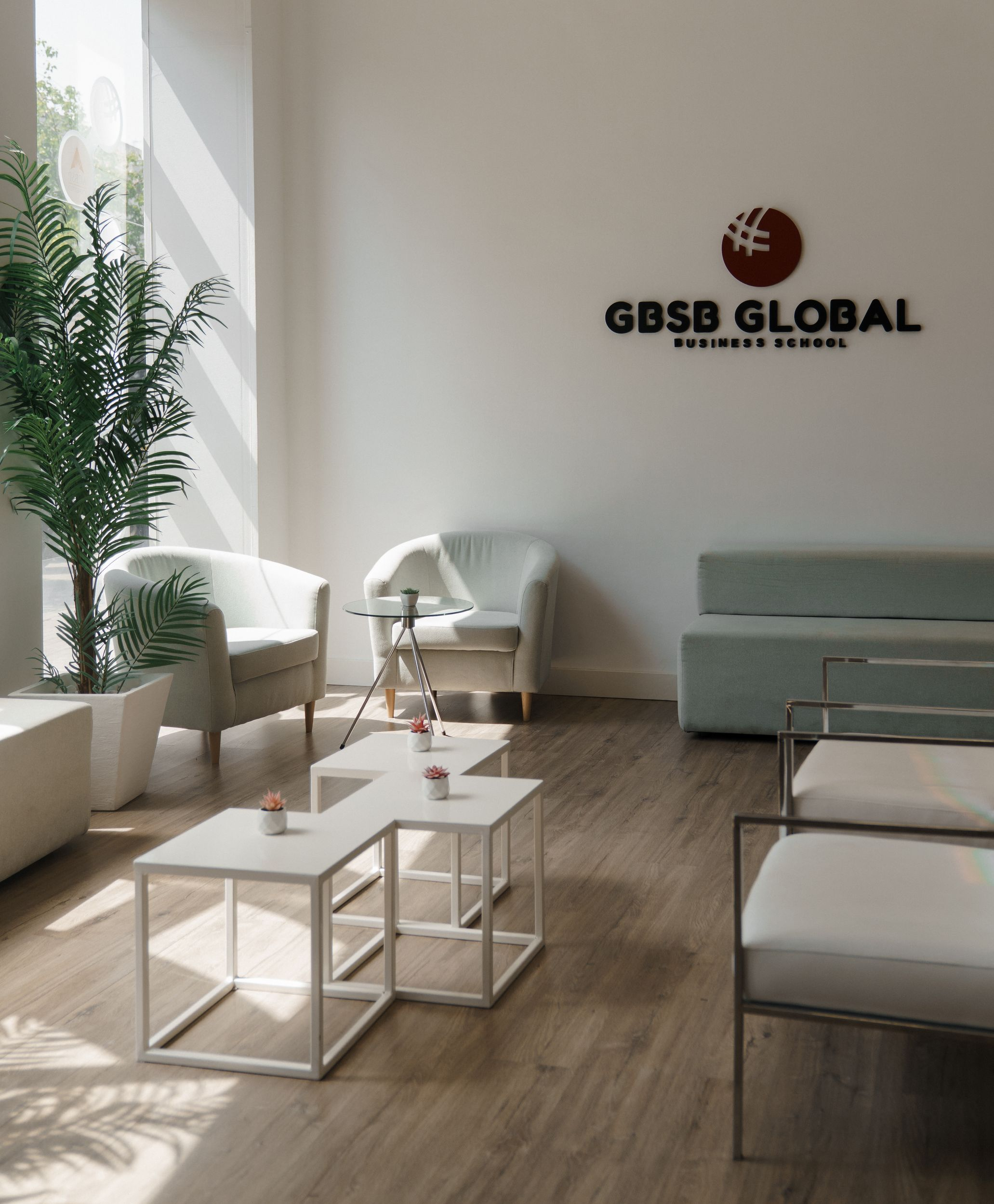
GBSB Global Campus in Barcelona.

== Entrepreneurship Center and G-Accelerator programs ==
The Entrepreneurship Center is the GBSB Global's hub dedicated to supporting and fostering innovation and entrepreneurship. It provides students and alumni who want to start their own business with a wide range of services. The Center helps them create a roadmap for their entrepreneurial endeavors by offering support in developing business plans, securing mentorship, and accessing relevant resources.

One of the Center's flagship initiatives in Barcelona is the G-Accelerator Impact Call Program, a six-month pre-accelerator program that supports the next generation of entrepreneurs with innovative and disruptive ideas. Co-funded by the Generalitat de Catalunya and the European Social Fund, the program is specifically designed to promote the creation of businesses that are sustainable from social, economic, and environmental perspectives. It supports seed and pre-seed startups or projects throughout their journey.

In 2024, a version of the G-Accelerator program was launched in Malta, expanding support for early-stage entrepreneurial projects on the island. The G-Accelerator Malta Program is open to GBSB Global students and alumni, as well as Maltese citizens looking to innovate through new products, business divisions, or reaching new markets beyond their current one.

In 2025, GBSB Global Business School partnered with Xarxa Agritech, a network coordinated by Catalonia’s Institute for Agrifood Research and Technology (IRTA), to launch Impuls Agritech 2025 a pre-acceleration program targeting research-driven agritech ventures. The program fosters entrepreneurship, applied research, and innovation at the intersection of agriculture, technology, and sustainability.

== Notable alumni ==
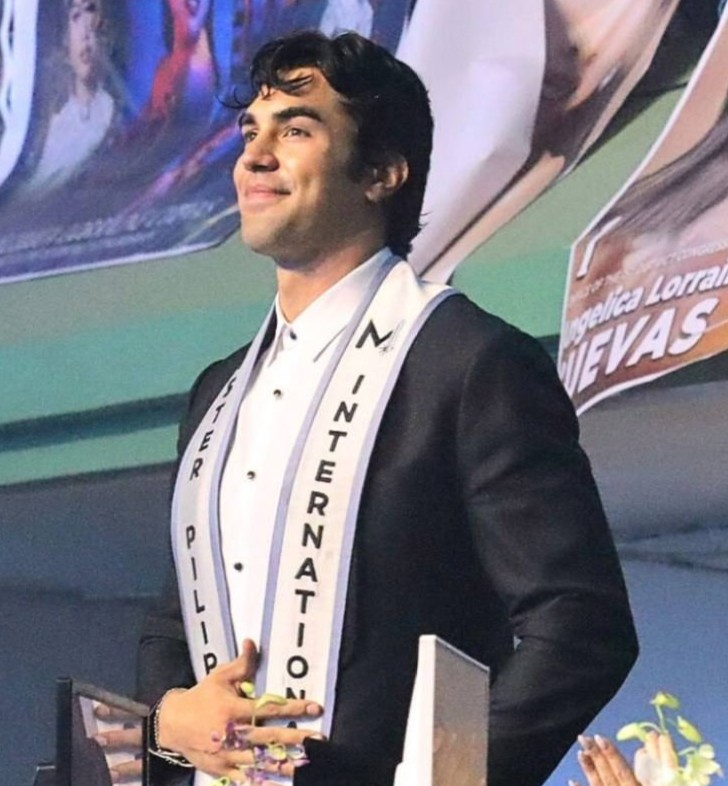
Kirk Bondad (BBA)
- Surya Balu, cricket player from India
- Kirk Bondad, model and Mister International 2025 from the Philippines
- Carlo Zammit Lonardelli, football player—central midfielder for Floriana and the Malta national team.
