= Manhunt International Philippines =

National male beauty pageant competition in the Philippines

- Formation: 1993
- Type: Male Beauty Pageant
- Legal status: Active
- Headquarters: Manila, Philippines
- Official language: English, Filipino
- Leader: Jonas Gaffud
- Parent organization: Manhunt International

Manhunt International Philippines was a beauty pageant in the Philippines open to male contestants.

In 2017, Empire Philippines, Inc. acquired the franchise and has been conferred through Global Asian Model Philippines from 2018 and through Mister Pilipinas Worldwide beginning in 2023.

== Titles ==
Number of Wins under Manhunt International Philippines
Current franchises
Pageant	Title	Winning year(s)
Manhunt International	1	2012

== Titleholders ==
Year	Titleholder	Placement	Special Award(s)
1993	Aaron Small	3rd Runner Up	Mr. Physique
1994	Bernie Vedasco Guindo	Unplaced	
1995	Roy de Guzman	Unplaced	
1997	Vincent Pinto	2nd Runner Up	Best in Talent
1998	Michael Sol Cruz	Unplaced	
1999	Alexander Judilla	Unplaced	Best in National Costume
2000	Richard Stewart	Unplaced	Best in Talent
2001	Ric Cayzer	Unplaced	Mr. Personality
2002	Bruce Quebral	Unplaced	
2005	Ronald Brent Javier	Unplaced	Mr. Internet Popularity
2006	Iago Raterta	Top 16	
2007	Don Mendoza	Unplaced	Runway Model (1st Runner Up)
2008	Marvin Wijangco	Top 16	Mr. Personality
2010	Carlo Morris Galang	Unplaced	
2011	Ron Marvin Miranda	Top 16	
2012	June Mendoza Macasaet	Manhunt International 2012	New Urban Male Ambassador
2013	Jamiel Ventosa	No Pageant Held	
2016	Don Mcgyver Cochico	Top 16	
2017	Daniel Azurin	Top 16	Mr. Photogenic
2018	Jeff Langan	3rd Runner Up	Best Fashion Model
2020	Daumier Corilla	Top 10	Best in National Costume
2022	Joshua De Sequera	1st Runner Up	Best Commercial Model; Mr. AQ Prime - Streaming King
2024	Kenneth Stromsnes	2nd Runner Up	Best Personality
2025	Jordan San Juan	3rd Runner Up	
2026	Raven Renz Lansangan	Top 20	
2027	John Paul Gundayao		

== See also ==
- Mister World Philippines
- Mister Pilipinas Worldwide
