= June Macasaet =

Filipino actor and model (born 1983)

- Born: June Niño Mendoza Macasaet; June 8, 1983 (age 43); Lipa City, Batangas, Philippines
- Education: Centro Escolar University (Marketing)
- Occupations: Actor; model
- Height: 1.90 m (6 ft 3 in)
- Partner: Samuel Kenz (2003-2010)
- Beauty pageant titleholder
- Title: Manhunt International Philippines 2012; Manhunt International 2012
- Hair color: Black
- Eye color: Black
- Major competitions: Century Tuna Superbods 2012 (1st Runner-up); Manhunt International Philippines 2012 (Winner); Manhunt International 2012 (Winner) (New Urban Male Ambassador); Fashion Asia 2014 Top Model (Winner)

June Niño Mendoza Macasaet (Tagalog: [ˈʤuːn ˈmaˈkasaʔet]; born June 8, 1983) is a Filipino model, actor, and male pageant titleholder who was crowned Manhunt International 2012. He is the first Filipino and Southeast Asian to win the international male beauty pageant. He also holds the record for the longest reign (approximately 4 years) in the history of the competition, thus far.

== Early life and education ==
Macasaet was born on June 8, 1983 in Lipa City, Batangas, Philippines, as the eldest of four siblings. He was a college varsity basketball player of Centro Escolar University, where he later earned his marketing degree.

== Pageantry ==
=== Manhunt International Philippines 2012 ===
Macasaet won Manhunt International Philippines 2012 in the finals held in Makati, Philippines.

=== Manhunt International 2012 ===
Macasaet was crowned Manhunt International 2012 in Bangkok, Thailand, making him the first Filipino to win the title of Manhunt International since its creation in 1993. He bested 52 other candidates from around the world. Macasaet also received the special award for "Best Urban Male Ambassador". He holds the record of longest reign as Manhunt International, thus far, reigning for 4 years until a new Manhunt International winner was elected in 2016. This is, however, due to a hiatus of the Manhunt International pageant from 2012 until 2016, when a new winner was crowned. Macasaet did not win multiple or consecutive titles, and his record for longest reign is more of a technicality than an achievement.

As Manhunt International, Macasaet travelled to Portugal, Brazil, Puerto Rico, the Dominican Republic, Haiti, Ghana, Nigeria, South Africa, Zimbabwe, France, Switzerland, Georgia, the Czech Republic, Norway, Poland, Finland, Cyprus, Japan, South Korea, China, Singapore, Australia, New Zealand, Canada, the United States, Mexico, Argentina, Thailand, Cambodia, Malaysia, Sweden, and his home country of the Philippines to attend national Manhunt selections, serve as judge, and fulfill his duties as ambassador of the Manhunt International organization.

== Career ==
Macasaet was a professional model prior to joining pageants, but welcomed more projects such as commercials, endorsements, and TV guestings after his Manhunt International victory. His acting debut was in the daytime drama, Be Careful With My Heart (2013), followed by his appearance in the primetime fantasy drama, Dyesebel (2014). He co-hosted the reality show, Day Off of GMA News TV with actress, model, and Miss Universe 2013 3rd runner-up Ariella Arida in 2014. He appeared in the films Bekikang: Ang Nanay Kong Beki and Maria Leonora Teresa in 2013 and 2014 respectively.

In 2014, Macasaet bagged the Asian Top Fashion Male Model of the Year representing the Philippines at the Fashion Asia Awards 2014 in China.

== Personal life ==
In 2022, Macasaet married Nicole Schmitz, Binibining Pilipinas International 2012. They reside in Australia.

== See also ==
- Manhunt International Philippines

Awards and achievements
Preceded by Kenji Ogawa	Fashion Asia 2014 top male model of the year 2014	Succeeded by TBD
Preceded by Chen Jiang Feng	Manhunt International; 2012	Succeeded by TBD
Preceded by Ron Marvin Miranda	Manhunt International Philippines; 2012	Succeeded by Jamiel Ventosa
