= Valentine Udemadu =

Nigerian model and activist (born 2002)

- Born: Valentine Udemadu; Anambra, Nigeria
- Occupations: model; child's right activist
- Beauty pageant titleholder
- Title: Misters of Nigeria 2026
- Major competitions: Misters of Nigeria 2026; (Winner)

Valentine Udemadu (born July 14, 2002) is a Nigerian model, pageant titleholder, and children's rights activist who was crowned Mister of Nigeria 2026 at the Misters of Nigeria competition held on April 23, 2026, in Lagos. He is Nigeria's first representative at the inaugural Misters of Africa competition.

== Background and education ==
Udemadu is from Uli in Ihiala, Anambra State. He earned a law degree from Nnamdi Azikiwe University.

== Career ==
Udemadu began his career as a photographer and visual storyteller. His work has been featured on PhotoVogue, the photography platform of Vogue. Some of his artistic projects have been exhibited in collaboration with the Anambra State Government.

He later founded The Vanguard Project, an initiative aimed at promoting legal literacy among children and young people through educational and awareness programs.

=== Pageantry ===
Udemadu represented Anambra state at the sixth edition of the Misters of Nigeria competition held on April 23, 2026, at the MUSON Centre, Lagos. He competed alongside 17 finalists selected from contestants representing Nigeria's 36 states nd the Federal Capital Territory. He was later announced as the winner and Nigeria's representative at the inaugural Misters of Africa competition.
