= Kirk Bondad =

Filipino model and male pageant titleholder

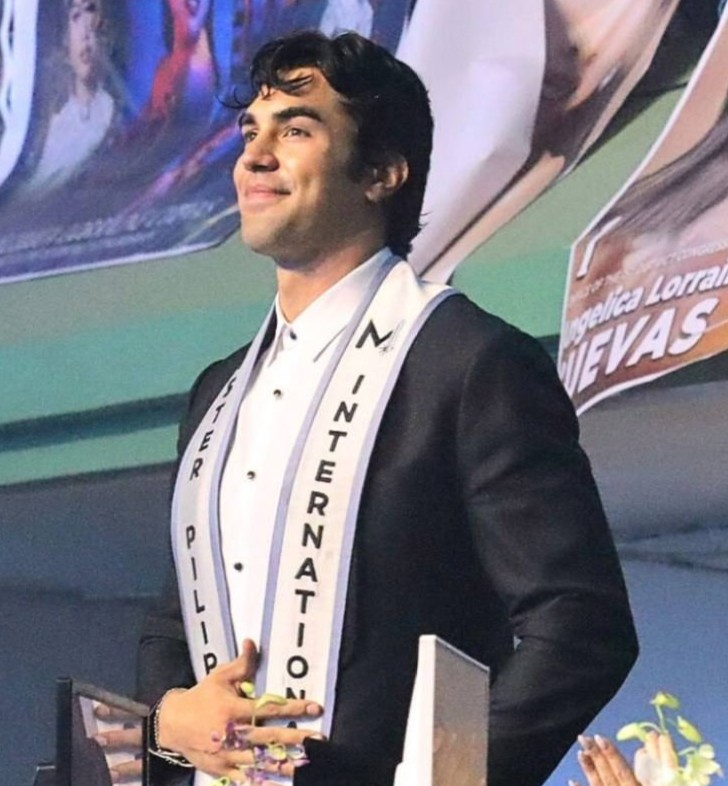
- Bondad in 2025
- Born: Kirk Bondad Wachsmuth; June 7, 1997 (age 29); Baguio City, Philippines
- Education: GBSB Global Business School (BBA)
- Height: 1.91 m (6 ft 3 in)
- Beauty pageant titleholder
- Title: Mister World Philippines 2022; Mister Pilipinas International 2025; Mister International 2025
- Major competitions: Mister World 2024; (Top 20); Mister Pilipinas Worldwide 2025; (Winner – Mister Pilipinas International); Mister International 2025; (Winner)

Kirk Bondad Wachsmuth (born June 7, 1997), professionally known as Kirk Bondad (Tagalog: [ˈkɪɾk ˈbɔndad]), is a Filipino model, fitness trainer, and male pageant titleholder who won Mister International 2025. He is the second Filipino Mister International, following Neil Perez's victory in 2014.

He was previously Mister World Philippines 2022 and represented the Philippines at Mister World 2024, where he placed in the Top 20. He also won in the male category of Century Tuna Superbods 2022, an annual Philippine-based fitness competition.

== Early life and education ==
Bondad was born on June 7, 1997, in Baguio City, Philippines to a Filipino mother of indigenous Igorot descent from the Cordilleras, and a German father of German, Filipino, and Spanish ancestries. He has two siblings: an older brother, Clint, a model and actor; and a sister, Dion, a physicist. The siblings have opted to legally use their matrilineal surname, as they and their careers are mainly based in the Philippines.

Bondad attended the GBSB Global Business School in Spain where he earned a degree in business administration.

== Career ==
=== Modeling ===
Bondad has worked as a model as early as 2017. He stayed in Bangkok for some time booking commercial modeling jobs. In 2019, he came home and established residence in Bonifacio Global City, then made his fashion modeling and runway debut, walking in Paris Fashion Week. Some of his modeling work includes campaigns for Bench, Michael Cinco, and Francis Libiran, and features on VMan, Tatler, and other magazines and publications. Besides commercial and fashion modeling, Bondad also works as a fitness trainer and model. He is also a former e-sports player.

=== Pageantry ===
==== Mister World 2024 ====
Bondad was appointed as Mister World Philippines in 2022, although the competition was postponed until 2024. As Mister World Philippines, he represented the country at the Mister World 2024 competition in Vietnam, where he placed in the Top 20. He also finished as first runner-up in the sports challenge, and placed in the Top 5 and Top 20 of the top model challenge and national costume competition, respectively.

==== Mister Pilipinas Worldwide 2025 ====
Representing Baguio, Bondad competed in the Mister Pilipinas Worldwide 2025 pageant and won the Mister Pilipinas International title.

==== Mister International 2025 ====
As Mister Pilipinas International 2025, Bondad represented the Philippines at the Mister International 2025 competition in Thailand. On September 25, 2025, he was crowned Mister International 2025, besting 41 other delegates. He also placed in the Top 5 of the national costume competition. Bondad's victory makes him the second Filipino to win the Mister International title in the competition's 17-year history, following Neil Perez's inaugural win for the Philippines in 2014.

During his time as Mister International, Bondad travelled to Indonesia, Malaysia, Singapore, Myanmar, Vietnam, Thailand, Laos, Cambodia, Taiwan, South Korea, mainland China, Hong Kong, Macau, Japan, the United Arab Emirates (Dubai), Türkiye, Puerto Rico, Brazil, Colombia, the Netherlands, Spain, the USA (in New York City; Tampa and Miami, Florida; and Los Angeles, California), and his home country of the Philippines.

== Personal life ==
Bondad is dyslexic. He was in a relationship with Filipina model and Miss Eco International 2022 Kathleen Paton until 2023. Bondad was then in a relationship with model and actress Lou Yanong; they confirmed their breakup in early 2025. In an interview with News5's MJ Marfori, Bondad confirmed that he and Yanong have been back together since July 2025.

Awards and achievements
Preceded by (Nigeria) Nwajagu Samuel	Mister International; 2025	Succeeded by (Mexico) Andrés Briseño
Preceded by Justine Ong; Tacloban	Mister International Philippines; 2025	Succeeded by John Wayne Alba; Calamba
Preceded by Jody Baines Saliba; Olongapo	Mister World Philippines; 2024	Succeeded by Aaron Beau Davis; Albay
