= Emmanuel Somto =

Nigerian entertainer (born 1997)

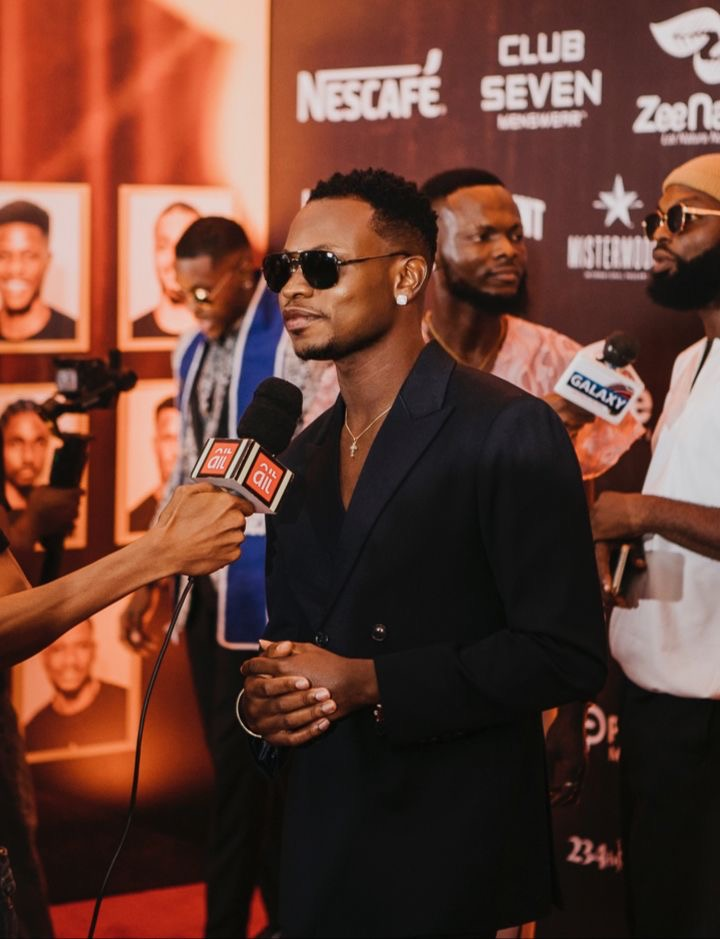
- Emmanuel Somto in 2024
- Born: 5 February 1997 (age 29); Kano, Kano State, Nigeria
- Education: Siam University
- Occupations: Model, actor, television personality
- Height: 1.83 m (6 ft 0 in)
- Beauty pageant titleholder
- Title: Mr Teen Nigeria 2016; Mr Global Nigeria 2021
- Hair color: Black
- Eye color: Brown
- Major competitions: Mister Global 2021 (Top 17) (Mister Popularity)

Emmanuel Somto (born 5 February 1997) is a Nigerian model, television personality and actor.

He won Mr Teen Nigeria in 2016, finished as African Continental Champion at the 2019 Mister Model International in Bangkok, Thailand. He was the Face of Oppo Mobile in 2020 and he is the first Nigerian to make the top seventeen at the Mister Global pageant.

== Background and education ==
Somto is from Imo State, but was born in Kano to the Mbah family and he is an only child. He had part of his primary education in Kano before relocating to his hometown, Eziama Ikeduru, in Imo State at age six where he stayed with his grandmother due to the constant religious crisis in Kano.

He obtained his West African examination certificate (WAEC) from Eziama Ikeduru commercial secondary school in 2013, and later acquired a National Diploma in Marketing from the Federal Polytechnic, Nekede, located in Nekede, Imo State.

In a bid to further his education, Somto went to Thailand in 2019 to study international business at Siam University in Bangkok.

== Career ==
Somto developed a passion for modelling after high school while working at a guest house in Port Harcourt. He was recruited into a Dhabry modelling agency in 2012. He passed the audition for Glo ultimate model Nigeria, but he was not among the winners.

He later contested for Mr Tourism Nigeria in 2013, but he was unable to continue with the pageant after he was robbed by hoodlums a few days to the grand finale.

In 2016, he won Mr Teen Nigeria, beating twenty other delegates from various states to win the title. As Mr Teen Nigeria, Somto donated food, clothes and other items to 2,164 prison inmates of the federal prisons in Owerri.

In 2016, Somto moved into acting and he featured in two Nollywood movies, Sparking Stone and Child of Mercy.

He went on to represent Nigeria at Mister Model International in Thailand in 2019 where he finished as the African Continental Champion. In a bid to encourage young Igbo entrepreneurs making waves in the diaspora, Ohanaeze Ndigbo Mekong River, Thailand, hosted Somto in Bangkok, to celebrate his achievements at the pageant.

In 2020, he became the face of Oppo Mobile Nigeria in the male category beating 2,500 other contestants. This also landed him a deal to star as cover for Genevieve Magazine.

In 2021, Somto represented Nigeria at the Mr Global pageant in Thailand where he became the first Nigerian to make top seventeen at the pageant. He also received the Mr Popularity Award at the competition.

He established Misters of Nigeria in 2021, which holds franchise to four international competitions and has produced three champions so far.

== Awards and nominations ==
Somto is a recipient of many awards, including Male Model of the Year at the 2016 Nigeria Heritage Icons Award, and Pageant King of the Year at the 2018 Nigeria Achiever's Awards.

== Personal life ==
During a 2020 interview with the Daily Post, Somto professed his love for Nollywood actress Genevieve Nnaji. He stated that he would like to marry the actress despite the age difference between them.
