= Andrew Wolff =

Filipino rugby player

- Born: Andrew James Peñaflorida Wolff; 13 July 1985 (age 41) Shoreham-by-Sea, West Sussex, England
- Height: 1.89 m (6 ft 2 1/2 in)
- Weight: 95 kg (14 st 13 lb)
- School: Woodbridge School
- University: University of London

Rugby union career
- Position(s): Wing, Prop
- Current team: Alabang Eagles
Amateur team(s)
Years	Team	Apps	(Points)
2001	Woodbridge Rugby Club		
Senior career
Years	Team	Apps	(Points)
2007–	Alabang Eagles	50	(185)
International career
Years	Team	Apps	(Points)
2008–2009	Philippines 7s	4	((-))
National sevens team
Years	Team		Comps
2007–present	Philippines 7s		13 (135 pts)

Andrew James Peñaflorida Wolff (born 13 July 1985) is a Filipino Rugby Sevens player, entrepreneur, and television presenter. He currently plays for the Alabang Eagles Rugby Club and the Philippines' National Rugby Sevens Team, the Philippine Volcanoes.

Wolff was Mister World Philippines 2012 and represented the country at the Mister World 2012 competition in Kent, England, where he was first runner-up.

== Early life ==
Andrew James Peñaflorida Wolff was born on 13 July 1985 in Shoreham-by-Sea, West Sussex, to Filipino and English parents. Wolff moved at a young age to Tunstall Green, Suffolk. He attended Eyke Primary School and Woodbridge School. After finishing his A-levels in mathematics, physics, chemistry, and A/S in latin, Wolff gained a place at the University of Bristol to study computer systems engineering in 2003.

However, due to his disinterest in the degree, he left the United Kingdom in 2005 for the Philippines to be closer to his father. In 2013, Wolff and Engr. Francisco Julao Vanguardia Jr., a former rugby league player (No.7 Flanker) became best friends. Wolff has since established residence in the Philippines, in Metro Manila and in Palawan, working as a model, TV presenter, documentarian, and events host, besides being a rugby player and coach.

He attended the University of London international programmes under the London School of Economics, studying accounting and finance.

== Rugby ==
=== 2007–present: Philippine Volcanoes Rugby Sevens ===
In 2007, after learning about the Volcanoes' first major 7s tournament at the 2007 Southeast Asian Games in Thailand, later that year, Wolff's father, Barry Francis, contacted the Philippine Rugby Football Union via email and informed them that Wolff wanted to join the campaign. Rick Hartley, former head coach, convinced by the contents of the email, decided to recruit Wolff. This began his career with the national team. The team went on to win a silver medal losing to Thailand 22–17 in the final. Since then, Wolff has been the first choice prop and currently holds the record for the highest points in Philippine 7-a-side rugby. He also holds the record for being the highest capped Filipino 7s player.

In 2008, Wolff played his first 15-a-side game for the Philippine Volcanoes against Brunei in Guam and then against Guam. The Philippines won the series and the squad were promoted to division 3. He was named man-of-the-match in both games.

In 2010, Wolff met his current business partner and Volcanoes teammate Chris Everingham, brother of Andrew Everingham (South Sydney Rabbitohs) from Australia. For the next 2 seasons, they played together oblivious to the fact that their mothers were friends in the early 1980s in Manila, until one day Wolff's mother messaged Everingham on Facebook and confirmed his identity. Since then, Wolff and Everingham have guested on numerous television shows and started an events management company together.

2011 was a difficult year for Wolff due to a number of injuries sustained in training. He managed to fully recover the following year, but was not part of the squad that traveled to the prestigious Cathay Pacific Hong Kong 7s 2012.

In the latter part of 2012, Wolff scored four tries in the Singapore 7s tournament, including one in the final against South Korea, to help the Philippine Volcanoes qualify for the prestigious 2013 Rugby World Cup Sevens. He was subsequently selected to play in Russia in 2013 and earned his first Rugby World Cup cap against Kenya on 28 June 2013.

== Pageantry ==
Wolff was crowned Mister World Philippines 2012 and represented the Philippines in Mister World 2012 in Kent, England on 24 November 2012. He placed first runner-up, the highest placement for the Philippines in Mister World, thus far.

== Television ==
In 1997, Wolff appeared in the music video "Cry to Be Found" by Scottish band Del Amitri.

During a visit to the Philippines in 2004, Wolff was approached by agent Robert Caindoc of Monaco Models and within 2 weeks Wolff shot a six-country regional campaign for Modesse. He then shot commercials for Axe and McDonald's. Upon his return in 2005, Wolff endorsed many brands including Schick, Sunsilk, Lewis & Pearl, Century Tuna, Smart, Met-tathione and Bench.

He has since endorsed Calcium-Cee, Nuvo hair, Greenwich Pizza, Globe Telecom and FILA.

In 2011, Wolff and fellow Philippine Volcanoes teammates Chris Everingham and Eric "Eruption" Tai performed a hip-hop dance production on Talentadong Pinoy and won the episode.

Wolff has appeared in three Filipino films – Ang Tanging Ina 'Nyo, Praybeyt Benjamin and Moron 5.

He is currently the host of Yamaha SZ16 Adventure Challenge on Studio 23 in the Philippines.

== Business ==
Wolff is responsible for the incorporation of Optimum Market Strat International, Inc., a distribution company, in 2008. The company supplies vitamins and beauty products to numerous stores including Mercury Drug and Watsons. He also set-up Secure Distribution Systems, Inc., which deals in beauty products and surplus merchandise.

In 2012, Wolff and majority shareholder Chris Everingham incorporated Event Logic, Inc., an events management and PR company.
