= Mister International 2025 =

17th edition of Mister International (Thailand)

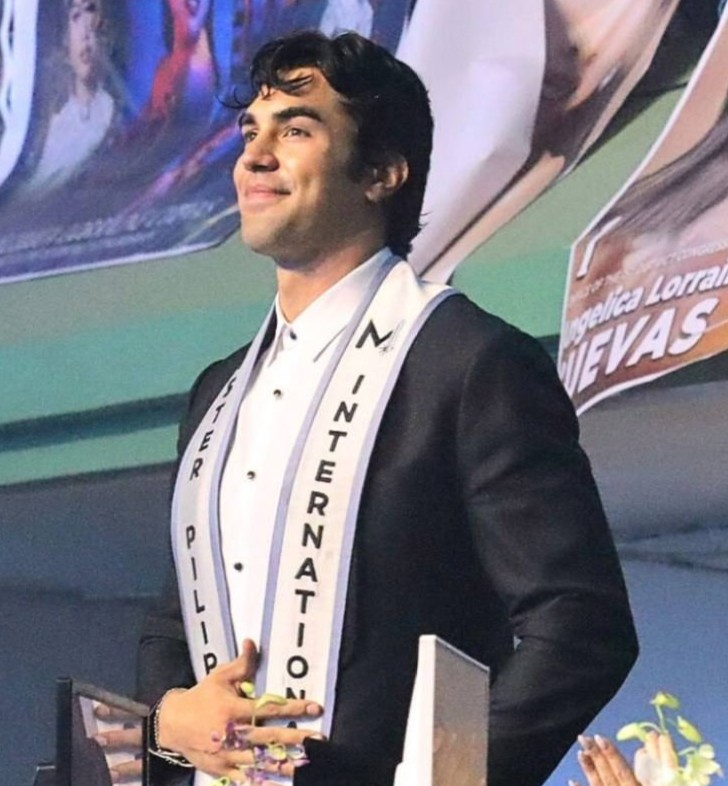
- Kirk Bondad
- Date: 25 September 2025
- Presenters: Ahtisa Manalo; Anusith Sangnimnuan; Thitisan Goodburn
- Entertainment: Pattreeya Payom
- Venue: MCC Hall, The Mall Lifestore Ngamwongwan, Nonthaburi, Thailand
- Broadcaster: YouTube
- Entrants: 42
- Placements: 20
- Debuts: Côte d'Ivoire; Democratic Republic of the Congo; Ghana; Kenya; Tunisia
- Withdrawals: Benin; Bosnia and Herzegovina; Cambodia; Cameroon; China; Cuba; Curaçao; England; Haiti; Malaysia; Netherlands; Peru; Poland; Scotland; Singapore; Taiwan; United States
- Returns: Costa Rica; Egypt; Guinea-Bissau; Nicaragua; Northern Cyprus; Paraguay; Turkey
- Winner: Kirk Bondad; Philippines
- Congeniality: Rodrigo Soni, Brazil
- Best National Costume: Kanapol Treesongkiat, Thailand
- Photogenic: Công Vinh Đoàn, Vietnam

Mister International 2025 was the 17th Mister International pageant, held at MCC Hall, The Mall Lifestore Ngamwongwan, Nonthaburi, on 25 September 2025.

Nwajagu Samuel of Nigeria crowned Kirk Bondad of the Philippines as his successor at the conclusion of the event. This marks the Philippines's second title, following their first win in 2014.

== Background ==
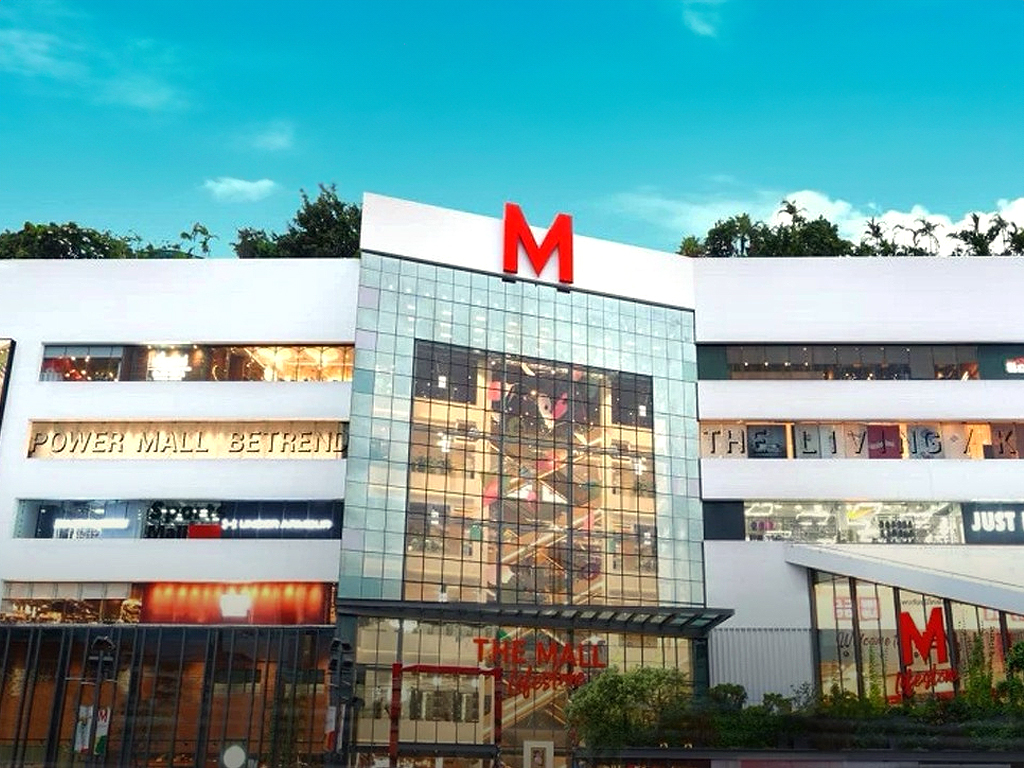
The Mall Lifestore Ngamwongwan, the venue of Mister International 2025

=== Location and date ===
The 17th edition of the Mister International pageant will take place at the MCC Hall, The Mall Lifestore Ngamwongwan in Nonthaburi province, Thailand on 25 September 2025.

=== Selection of participants ===
For the first time in the Mister International history, married men, fathers, and divorced contestants are allowed to compete, reflecting a commitment to inclusivity.

==== Debuts and withdrawals ====
This edition marked the debut of Côte d'Ivoire, the Democratic Republic of the Congo, Ghana, and Tunisia. Marc Tyson Jean of Haiti had to withdraw from the competition due to visa complications. Similarly, Casey de Vries of the Netherlands and Mhar Jayson of Singapore also withdrew, though the reasons for their withdrawal remain undisclosed. Meanwhile, Thamil Chelvan of Malaysia, Daniel Fatoma of Sierra Leone, and Evan Schrader of the United States were expected to compete but ultimately did not arrive in the host country. Other contestants withdrew from the competition for unknown reasons.

== Pageant ==
Miss Universe Philippines 2025 Ahtisa Manalo, Mister International 2023 Thitisan Goodburn, and Anusith Sangnimnuan served as the presenters.

== Results ==
=== Placements ===
| Placement | Contestant |
|---|---|
| Mister International 2025 | Philippines – Kirk Bondad |
| 1st Runner-Up | Lebanon – Saadedine Hneineh |
| 2nd Runner-Up | South Korea – Seung-ho Choi |
| 3rd Runner-Up | Nigeria – Bethel Mbamara |
| 4th Runner-Up | Costa Rica – Roberto Mena α |
| 5th Runner-Up | Thailand – Kanapol Treesongkiat |
| Top 11 | Brazil – Rodrigo Soni; Canada – Liam Thibault β; France – Axel Pallier; Mexico – Willy Inurreta; Vietnam – Công Vinh Đoàn γ |
| Top 20 | Côte d'Ivoire – Josué Coulibaly; Dominican Republic – Aldo Farías; Egypt – Mohamed Basal; India – Madhuram Daga; Indonesia – Oliver Prasetyo δ; Japan – Dan Reynolds; Myanmar – Yar Zar Htet Aung; Spain – Christian Losana; Sri Lanka – Ian Vonhagt |

Notes:
α – Placed into the Top 6 through the Mister People's Choice Award (fan vote)
β – Placed into the Top 20 through the Mister Influencer Award (fan vote)
γ – Placed into the Top 20 through the Mister Photogenic Award (fan vote)
δ – Placed into the Top 20 through the Mister Social Impact Award & Mister Digital Media Excellence Award (both chosen by the organization)

==== Continental Winners ====
| Continent | Contestant |
|---|---|
| Africa | Nigeria – Bethel Mbamara |
| Americas | Costa Rica – Roberto Mena |
| Asia | Lebanon – Saadedine Hneineh |
| Europe | France – Axel Pallier |

==== Special Awards ====
| Award | Contestant | |
|---|---|---|
| Best in Swimwear | Winner | Lebanon – Saadedine Hneineh |
| Best in Swimwear | Top 5 | Canada – Liam Thibault; Côte d'Ivoire – Josué Coulibaly; Nigeria – Bethel Mbamara; South Korea – Seung-ho Choi |
| Best National Costume | Winner | Thailand – Kanapol Treesongkiat |
| Best National Costume | Top 5 | Costa Rica – Roberto Mena; Ecuador – Cristian Proaño; Indonesia – Oliver Prasetyo; Philippines – Kirk Bondad |
| Dr. Face Choice | Myanmar – Yar Zar Htet Aung; Philippines – Kirk Bondad; Vietnam – Công Vinh Đoàn | |
| Mister Congeniality | Brazil – Rodrigo Soni | |
| Mister Digital Media Excellence | Indonesia – Oliver Prasetyo | |
| Mister Influencer | Canada – Liam Thibault | |
| Mister People's Choice | Costa Rica – Roberto Mena | |
| Mister Photogenic | Vietnam – Công Vinh Đoàn | |
| Mister Social Impact | Indonesia – Oliver Prasetyo | |
| Most Telegenic by Oxin Film | Canada – Liam Thibault | |

== Contestants ==
42 contestants competed for the title;

| Country/Territory | Contestant | Age (Note: Ages at the time of the pageant) | Hometown | Ref. |
|---|---|---|---|---|
| Brazil | Rodrigo Soni | 34 | Santa Catarina | |
| Canada | Liam Thibault | 18 | Toronto | |
| Colombia | Andrés Arboleda | 26 | Manizales | |
| Costa Rica | Roberto Mena | 27 | Escazú | |
| Côte d'Ivoire | Josué Coulibaly | 23 | San-Pédro | |
| Czech Republic | Jiří Veselý | 27 | Mladá Boleslav | |
| Democratic Republic of the Congo | Charles Mateus | 28 | Kinshasa | |
| Dominican Republic | Aldo Farías | 37 | San Juan de la Maguana | |
| Ecuador | Cristian Proaño | 35 | Quito | |
| Egypt | Mohamed Basal | 27 | Beheira | |
| El Salvador | Cristian Portillo | 25 | La Palma | |
| France | Axel Pallier | 29 | Montpellier | |
| Ghana | Bernard Yartei | 26 | — | |
| Guinea-Bissau | Cristiano Mendes | 32 | — | |
| India | Madhuram Daga | 20 | Kolkata | |
| Indonesia | Oliver Prasetyo | 26 | Manado | |
| Italy | Gabriele Manna | 19 | Villaricca | |
| Japan | Dan Reynolds | 28 | Osaka | |
| Kenya | Pasika Bisakaya | 20 | — | |
| Laos | Sukiphon Vongsack | 19 | — | |
| Lebanon | Saadedine Hneineh | 22 | Riyadh | |
| Mali | Mamadou Traoré | 24 | Bamako | |
| Mexico | Willy Inurreta | 21 | Veracruz | |
| Myanmar | Yar Zar Htet Aung | 23 | Dala | |
| Nepal | Siddhartha Tamang | 19 | — | |
| Nicaragua | Jonathan Amador | 30 | Managua | |
| Nigeria | Bethel Mbamara | 24 | Port Harcourt | |
| Northern Cyprus | Eray Eroğlu | 24 | — | |
| Panama | Carlos Díaz | 36 | Panama City | |
| Paraguay | Pablo González | 23 | — | |
| Philippines | Kirk Bondad | 28 | Baguio | |
| Puerto Rico | Jeremy López | 22 | Camuy | |
| South Africa | Tshiamo Malatsi | — | Johannesburg | |
| South Korea | Seung-ho Choi | 29 | Seoul | |
| Spain | Christian Losana | 25 | La Puebla | |
| Sri Lanka | Ian Vonhagt | 25 | Kalutara | |
| Switzerland | Bastien De Blasio | 24 | Vulliérain | |
| Thailand | Kanapol Treesongkiat | 25 | Bangkok | |
| Tunisia | Mehri Salah | 25 | — | |
| Turkey | Orhan Kesıcı | — | Istanbul | |
| Venezuela | Anthony Gallardo | 33 | Caracas | |
| Vietnam | Công Vinh Đoàn | 25 | Tây Ninh | |
