= Mr World Philippines =

Beauty pageant

Mister World Philippines
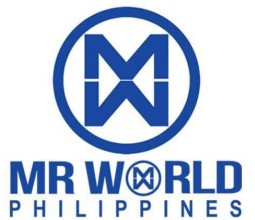
- Formation: 2011; 15 years ago
- Founder: Cory Quirino
- Type: Beauty pageant
- Headquarters: Manila
- Location: Philippines
- Members: Mister World
- Official language: Filipino; English
- National Director: Cory Quirino; (2011–2016); Arnold L. Vegafria; (2017–present)
- Key people: Julia Morley

Mr World Philippines is a beauty pageant in the Philippines that selects the country's representatives to the Mister World pageant.

== History ==
The first Mister World representative under the Miss World Philippines Organization is Andrew Wolff who placed first runner-up in the Mister World 2012 pageant. In 2014, two contenders were appointed as representatives, John de Lara Spainhour for the 2014 edition and Sam Valdes Ajdani for the 2016 edition.

Under the new directorship of Vegafria, in 2018, the Philippine representative for Mister World was selected through a contest instead of appointment for the first time. Aside from Mister World, the contest also selected the representative to Mister Supranational, Mister Eco International, and Mister Multinational.

== Editions ==
Year	Date	Presenters	Broadcasters	Entrants	Venue
2018	October 23	RJ Ladesma; Laura Lehmann	GMA Network	16	Newport Performing Arts Theater, Resorts World Manila
2026	August 2	Maria Gigante; Teejay Marquez; Tracy Perez		17	Newport Performing Arts Theater, Resorts World Manila

== Titleholders ==
Year	Title	Titleholder
2012	Mister World Philippines	Andrew James Wolff
2014	Mister World Philippines	John Spainhour
2016	Mister World Philippines	Sam Ajdani
2018	Mister World Philippines	Jody Baines Saliba
2018	Mister Supranational Philippines	Marco Poli
2018	Mister Eco Philippines	Robin Hanrath
2018	Mister Multinational Philippines	Denver Hernandez
2018	1st Runner-up	Ameen Sardouk
2018	2nd Runner-up	Wilfred Placencia
2019	Mister Supranational Philippines	Denver Hernandez
2021	Mister Supranational Philippines	John Adajar
2022	Mister World Philippines	Kirk Bondad
2022	Mister Supranational Philippines	RaÉd Al-Zghayér
2026	Mister World Philippines	Aaron Beau Davis
2026	Mister Universe Philippines	Logan Culp
2026	Mister Globe Philippines	Raymond Paris Cabuco
2026	Mister Interglobal Philippines	Alex Herberich
2026	Mister Model Philippines	Wendell Oliver Pamfilo
2026	Mister Glam Philippines	Jesus Guinto
2026	Mister Tourism Philippines	Christian Manalo
2026	1st Runner-up	Sean Kyle Ortega
2026	2nd Runner-up	Christian Villarin

== International Placements ==
=== Current Titles ===
Color key

- : Declared as winner.
- : Ended as runner-up.
- : Ended as finalist or semi-finalist.

==== Mister World ====
Year	Mister World Philippines	Represented	Competition performance	
Year	Mister World Philippines	Represented	Placements	Other award(s)
1996	Christopher Celis	Manila	Unplaced	None
1998	Rico Miguel	Batangas City	Unplaced	None
2000	Roderick Salvador	Baguio	Unplaced	None
2003	Marco Tamayo	Davao City	Unplaced	None
2007	Emmanuel Mago	Camarines Sur	Unplaced	None
2010	Alvin de Joya	Isabela	Unplaced	None
2012	Andrew James Wolff	Manila	1st Runner-up	Multimedia Challenge
2014	John Spainhour	Manila	Unplaced	None
2016	Sam Ajdani	Iloilo City	Unplaced	None
2019	Jody Baines Saliba	Olongapo	Top 12	Mister World Asia Pacific
2024	Kirk Bondad	Baguio	Top 20	None
2026	Aaron Beau Davis	Albay		

=== Former Titles ===
==== Mister Globe ====
Year	Mister Globe Philippines	Hometown	Competition performance	
Year	Mister Globe Philippines	Hometown	Placements	Other award(s)
Representatives From Mister World Philippines
2027	Raymond Paris Cabuco	Baguio		
Representatives From Mister Island Philippines
2028				

==== Mister Interglobal ====
Year	Mister Interglobal Philippines	Hometown	Competition performance	
Year	Mister Interglobal Philippines	Hometown	Placements	Other award(s)
Representatives From Mister World Philippines
2027	Alex Herberich	Pangasinan		
Representatives From Mister Island Philippines
2028				

==== Mister Universe ====
Year	Mister Universe Philippines	Hometown	Competition performance	
Year	Mister Universe Philippines	Hometown	Placements	Other award(s)
Representatives From Mister World Philippines
2026	Logan Culp			
Representatives From Mister Island Philippines
2027				

==== Mister Model International ====
Year	Mister Model Philippines	Hometown	Competition performance	
Year	Mister Model Philippines	Hometown	Placements	Other award(s)
Representatives From Mister World Philippines
2026	Wendell Oliver Pamfilo	Nueva Ecija	Top 5	Mister Model Asia Pacific
Representatives From Mister Island Philippines
2027				

==== Mister Glam International ====
Year	Mister Glam Philippines	Hometown	Competition performance	
Year	Mister Glam Philippines	Hometown	Placements	Other award(s)
Representatives From Mister World Philippines
2026	Jesus Guinto	Bulacan		
Representatives From Mister Island Philippines
2027				

==== Mister Supranational ====
Year	Mister Supranational Philippines	Hometown	Competition performance	
Year	Mister Supranational Philippines	Hometown	Placements	Other award(s)
Representatives From Misters of Filipinas
2016	Alberto Rodulfo	Bohol	Top 20	Mister Internet
2017	Yves Campos	Cebu	Top 20	None
Representatives From Mister World Philippines
2018	Marco Poli	Batangas	Top 20	None
2019	Denver Hernandez	Malvar	Top 20	None
2021	John Edgar Adajar	Laguna	Top 20	None
2022	RaÉd Al-Zghayér	Cebu	Top 20	None
Representatives From Mister Pilipinas Worldwide
2023	Johannes Rissler	Panabo	Top 20	None
2024	Brandon Espiritu	Dededo	2nd Runner-up	Mister Influencer
2025	Kenneth Cabungcal	Dumaguete	4th Runner-up	None
2026	Felipe Marasigan	Manila	Top 20	None

==== Mister Eco International ====
Year	Mister Eco Philippines	Hometown	Competition performance	
Year	Mister Eco Philippines	Hometown	Placements	Other award(s)
2018	Robin Hanrath	Bay	Pageant not held	

==== Mister Multinational ====
Year	Mister Multinational Philippines	Hometown	Competition performance	
Year	Mister Multinational Philippines	Hometown	Placements	Other award(s)
2018	Denver Hernandez	Malvar	Appointed as Mister Supranational Philippines 2019	
