= Mister Cosmopolitan 2025 =

Beauty pageant

- Date: 7 September 2025
- Presenters: Thitisan Goodburn
- Venue: Siam Fantasy, Asiatique, Bangkok, Thailand
- Entrants: 18
- Placements: 10
- Debuts: Colombia; Myanmar; Nepal; Spain; Taiwan
- Withdrawals: Australia; Brazil; Italy; Singapore; United Kingdom
- Winner: Shawn Lin; Taiwan
- Congeniality: Khandy Noprian, (Indonesia)
- Best National Costume: Kenneth Marcelino, (Philippines)
- Photogenic: Kenneth Marcelino, (Philippines)

Mister Cosmopolitan 2025 was the 3rd edition of the Mister Cosmopolitan pageant, take place at Siam Fantasy, Asiatique, Bangkok, Thailand, on 7 September 2025. Thailand is hosting the event for the second consecutive year.

Daryl Ng of Singapore crowned Shawn Lin of Taiwan at the conclusion of the event.

== Results ==
=== Placements ===
Placement	Contestant
Winner	Taiwan — Shawn Lin §
1st Runner-Up	Philippines — Kenneth Marcelino
2nd Runner-Up	South Africa — Sandile Gama
3rd Runner-Up	Vietnam — Sỹ Tú Đinh
4th Runner-Up	France — Eddy Joblon
Top 10	Laos — Lattanavong Boudty; Malaysia — Aidil Fiqrie; Nigeria — Godwin Abiodun; Spain — Iván Cerrillo; Thailand — Anuwat Chaisedthee

§ – Voted into the Top 5 by viewers

==== Continent Kings ====
Continent	Contestant
Africa	Nigeria — Godwin Abiodun

==== Special awards ====
Award	Contestant
People's Choice Award	Taiwan — Shawn Lin
Best National Costume	Philippines — Kenneth Marcelino
Mister Photogenic	Philippines — Kenneth Marcelino
Best Physique	Nigeria — Godwin Abiodun
Best in Formal Wear	Nigeria — Godwin Abiodun
Best in Swimwear	South Africa — Sandile Gama
Best Talent	Thailand — Anuwat Chaisedthee

== Contestants ==
18 Contestants competed for the title

Country/Territory	Contestant	Age
Colombia	Juan Mancipe	—
China	Ma Bin	—
France	Eddy Joblon	—
India	Aaron Tariang	—
Indonesia	Khandy Noprian	—
Laos	Lattanavong Boudty	30
Malaysia	Aidiel Fiqrie	—
Myanmar	Thet Wai Ko	—
Nepal	Kelishan Bajracharya	—
Nigeria	Godwin Abiodun	—
Philippines	Kenneth Marcelino	25
South Africa	Sandile Gama	23
South Korea	Han-young Kim	—
Spain	Iván Cerrillo	—
Sri Lanka	Harsh Peiris	—
Taiwan	Shawn Lin	—
Thailand	Anuwat Chaisedthee	21
Vietnam	Sỹ Tú Đinh	25
