= Nwajagu Samuel =

Nigerian model and pageant titleholder

- Born: Nwajagu Chinemerem Samuel; 2000 or 2001 (age 24–25); Anambra, Nigeria
- Education: University of Port Harcourt
- Occupation: model
- Height: 1.91 m (6 ft 3 in)
- Beauty pageant titleholder
- Title: Mister International Nigeria 2024; Mister International 2024
- Major competitions: Misters of Nigeria 2024; (Mister International Nigeria 2024); Mister International 2024; (Winner)

Nwajagu Samuel is a Nigerian model and beauty pageant titleholder who was crowned Mister International 2024 on 14 December 2024 in Bangkok, Thailand. He became the first Nigerian, and the first African, to win the Mister International title in the competition's 16-year history.

== Pageantry ==
=== Misters of Nigeria 2024 ===
Samuel was among the top three out of 16 finalists at the Misters of Nigeria 2024 pageant, held at the Lagos Oriental Hotel, Lagos, Nigeria on 16 June 2024. By the end of the event, he was crowned Mister International Nigeria 2024.

=== Mister International 2024 ===
Samuel represented Nigeria at the 16th edition of the Mister International competition, held on 14 December 2024, in Island Hall, Fashion Island, Bangkok, Thailand. He competed against 47 other contestants, the highest number in the pageant's history. During the event, Samuel also won the Best in Swimwear subtitle. In the end, he was crowned Mister International 2024 by the outgoing titleholder, Thitisan Goodburn of Thailand. Samuel became the first Nigerian and the first African to win the Mister International title.

Awards and achievements
Preceded by (Thailand) Thitisan Goodburn	Mister International; 2024	Succeeded by (Philippines) Kirk Bondad
Preceded by Martin Osagie	Mister International Nigeria; 2024	Succeeded by Bethel Mbamara
