= Mister International 2024 (Thailand) =

16th edition of Mister International (Thailand)

- Date: 14 December 2024
- Presenters: Anusith Sangnimnuan; Thitisan Goodburn
- Venue: Bangkok, Thailand
- Broadcaster: YouTube
- Entrants: 47
- Placements: 16
- Debuts: Benin; Cameroon; Curaçao; England; Mali; Scotland
- Withdrawals: Bahamas; Belgium; Guinea-Bissau; Northern Cyprus; Trinidad and Tobago
- Returns: Bosnia and Herzegovina; Cambodia; China; Italy; Netherlands; Panama; Poland; South Africa
- Winner: Nwajagu Samuel; Nigeria
- Congeniality: Josef O'Brien, United States
- Best National Costume: Justine Ong, Philippines
- Photogenic: Anthony Henricus, Netherlands

Mister International 2024 was the 16th edition of the Mister International pageant, held in Bangkok, Thailand, on 14 December 2024.

Thitisan Goodburn of Thailand crowned Nwajagu Samuel of Nigeria as his successor at the conclusion of the event. This is Nigeria's first title in the history of the pageant.

== Results ==
=== Placements ===
Placement	Contestant
Mister International 2024	Nigeria – Nwajagu Samuel
1st Runner-Up	Vietnam – Mạnh Lân Nguyễn
2nd Runner-Up	Indonesia – Glenn Victor Sutanto
Top 6	Netherlands – Anthony Henricus; Philippines – Justine Ong §; Spain – Rafael Domínguez
Top 10	China – Olivier Liu; Ecuador – Abel Díaz; Italy – Leonardo Castaldo; Mexico – Brian Faugier; South Korea – Joon-sung Heo
Top 15	Colombia – Sebastián Nieves; Cuba – Christian Anoceto; France – Swann Lavigne; Thailand – Chutipong Buddharak; Venezuela – Emmanuel Serrano

§ – Fan Vote winner; Not part of the Top 15 (Voted into the Top 6 by viewers)

==== Special awards ====
Award	Contestant
Best in Swimwear	Nigeria – Nwajagu Samuel
Best National Costume	Philippines – Justine Ong
Fan Vote	Philippines – Justine Ong
Mister Congeniality	United States – Josef O'Brien
Mister Photogenic	Netherlands – Anthony Henricus

== Contestants ==
47 contestants competed for the title;

Country/Territory	Contestant	Age	Height	Hometown
Benin	Aladdin Tavolini	24	1.86 m (6 ft 1 in)	Lausanne
Brazil	Bruno Fonseca	35	1.84 m (6 ft 1/2 in)	Natal
Bosnia and Herzegovina	Anel Mehić	29	1.85 m (6 ft 1 in)	Srebrenica
Cambodia	Bunthea Neov	29	1.70 m (5 ft 7 in)	Battambang
Cameroon	Dipanda Léa	29	1.80 m (5 ft 11 in)	Douala
Canada	Kunal Raghava	—	1.78 m (5 ft 10 in)	Ottawa
China	Olivier Liu	20	1.83 m (6 ft 0 in)	Bienne
Colombia	Sebastián Nieves	29	1.85 m (6 ft 1 in)	Bogotá
Cuba	Christian Anoceto	25	1.85 m (6 ft 1 in)	Havana
Curaçao	Diadrie Williams	—	1.78 m (5 ft 10 in)	Willemstad
Czech Republic	Ondřej Valenta	32	1.88 m (6 ft 2 in)	Prague
Dominican Republic	Felipe Reyes	24	1.86 m (6 ft 1 in)	Bonao
Ecuador	Abel Díaz	32	1.85 m (6 ft 1 in)	Guayaquil
England	Nathaniel Cranton	21	1.89 m (6 ft 2 1/2 in)	Wareham
El Salvador	Josué Molina	26	1.83 m (6 ft 0 in)	San Salvador
France	Lavigne Swann	24	1.93 m (6 ft 4 in)	Taulignan
Haiti	Richardson Pierre	—	—	Port-au-Prince
India	Vishnu Choudhary	20	1.88 m (6 ft 2 in)	Jaipur
Indonesia	Glenn Victor Sutanto	35	1.83 m (6 ft 0 in)	Bandung
Italy	Leonardo Castaldo	20	1.85 m (6 ft 1 in)	Naples
Japan	Kodai Takahashi	25	1.83 m (6 ft 0 in)	Tokyo
Laos	Niphon Minoymanny	25	1.83 m (6 ft 0 in)	Vientiane
Lebanon	Rawad Aboutine	35	1.86 m (6 ft 1 in)	Beirut
Malaysia	Edison Ho	36	1.82 m (5 ft 11 1/2 in)	Kulim
Mali	Sissoko Harouna	36	1.80 m (5 ft 11 in)	Leya-Kayes
Mexico	Brian Faugier	30	1.90 m (6 ft 3 in)	Monterrey
Myanmar	Hein Htet Aung	25	1.78 m (5 ft 10 in)	Mandalay
Nepal	Kshitij Shrestha	25	1.78 m (5 ft 10 in)	Kathmandu
Netherlands	Anthony Henricus	21	1.83 m (6 ft 0 in)	Rotterdam
Nigeria	Nwajagu Samuel	23	1.91 m (6 ft 3 in)	Anambra
Panama	Mario Bianco	29	1.84 m (6 ft 1/2 in)	Chiriquí
Peru	Cristian Novoa	28	1.85 m (6 ft 1 in)	Tarapoto
Philippines	Justine Ong	24	1.80 m (5 ft 11 in)	Tacloban
Poland	Patryk Karbowski	31	1.91 m (6 ft 3 in)	Augustów
Puerto Rico	José López	34	1.80 m (5 ft 11 in)	San Juan
Scotland	Christian Hawkins	25	1.81 m (5 ft 11 1/2 in)	Edinburgh
Singapore	Baron Chia	30	1.80 m (5 ft 11 in)	Singapore
South Africa	SJ Pretorius	21	1.92 m (6 ft 3 1/2 in)	Heidelberg
South Korea	Joon-sung Heo	24	1.85 m (6 ft 1 in)	Seoul
Spain	Rafael Domínguez	28	1.94 m (6 ft 4 1/2 in)	San Sebastián
Sri Lanka	Maduranga Hewapathirana	27	1.80 m (5 ft 11 in)	Battaramulla
Switzerland	Thibaud Renaud	21	1.78 m (5 ft 10 in)	Geneva
Taiwan	Adam He	—	1.86 m (6 ft 1 in)	Tainan
Thailand	Chutipong Buddharak	30	1.81 m (5 ft 11 1/2 in)	Bangkok
United States	Josef O'Brien	25	1.87 m (6 ft 1 1/2 in)	Cleveland
Venezuela	Enmanuel Serrano	32	1.85 m (6 ft 1 in)	Caracas
Vietnam	Mạnh Lân Nguyễn	30	1.92 m (6 ft 3 1/2 in)	Hanoi

=== Withdrawals ===
Belgium - Nick J. Thyson - During the event Nick J. Thyson of Belgium withdrew from the competition due to personal health issues.
