= Filipino Italians =

Filipino Italian
Total population
- 170,000

Regions with significant populations
- Throughout Italy. Plurality in Milan, Rome, Bologna, Florence, Modena, Turin

Languages
- Italian · Filipino · Philippine languages · (Visayan · Kapampangan · Pangasinan) · English

Religion
- Predominantly Roman Catholicism

Related ethnic groups
- Filipinos · Overseas Filipinos

Filipino Italians are Italians who are either migrants or descendants of migrants from the Philippines. Filipinos form the fifth-largest migrant community in Italy, after the Romanian, Albanian, North African communities and Ukrainians. Italy is one of the largest European migration destination for Filipinos, the others being the UK and Spain. The Italian capital Rome and the city of Milan is home to the largest Filipino community. Roughly 108,000 documented Filipinos reside in Italy as temporary workers or permanent residents, and estimates on the number of undocumented Filipinos vary widely from 20,000 to 80,000. In 2008, ISTAT (Istituto Nazionale di Statistica), Italy’s statistics office, reported that there were 113,686 documented Filipinos living in Italy whereas the number had been 105,675 in 2007.

== Filipinos today ==
63% of Filipino Italians are women, and they mostly work as domestic assistants. The Filipino Department of Labor and Employment (DOLE) says that Italy allows 5000 non-seasonal/regular workers, up from 3000 in 2007. The DOLE said that the change was "a sign of appreciation of the good bilateral cooperation with the Philippines in migratory issues." There are approximately 60 Filipino organisations in Italy, most of which are church-based, although there are several cultural and civic groups as well. One of such groups is the Filipino Women's Council with the aim of educating Filipino women migrants about their rights and lobbying on their behalf.

In 2007, Italy gave Filipinos with a Filipino driver's license a free Italian driver's license.

== Remittances ==
In 2007, Filipinos in Italy sent the equivalent of US$500 million back to the Philippines, making it the fourth-largest source of remittances after the U.S., Saudi Arabia and Canada. The town of Mabini in Batangas has extensively benefited from Italian Filipinos; the town has the most former residents living abroad than any other Filipino town or city. Most of those living abroad work in Italy, and a section of Mabini today that has large homes built from remittance money is named "Little Italy". However, due to the economic slump in 2008, remittance money from Italy grew at a much slower pace than usual.

== Notable Filipinos of Italian descent ==
- Matteo Guidicelli - actor, model, singer and former kart racer (1990)
- Anthony Volpe - baseball player (2001)

== Notable Filipinos in Italy ==
- Marwin Angeles, footballer (1991)
- Simone Rota, footballer (1984)
- Dennis Villanueva, footballer (1992)
- Celeste Cortesi, Miss Earth Philippines 2018 and Miss Universe Philippines 2022 (1997)
- Brandon Vera, former ONE Heavyweight World Champion (1977)

== See also ==
- Milan (2004 film)
- I.T.A.L.Y. (2008 film)
- Overseas Filipino
- Italy–Philippines relations
- Santa Pudenziana, a national church designated for the Filipinos in Rome
