= Filipinos in the United Kingdom =

- Distribution by regional area.

Total population
- Philippines-born residents in the United Kingdom: 164,962 – 0.2% (2021/22 Census) (Note: Does not include Filipinos born in the United Kingdom or those with Filipino ancestry); England: 149,474 – 0.3% (2021); Scotland: 6,245 – 0.1% (2022); Wales: 5,542 – 0.2% (2021); Northern Ireland: 3,701 – 0.2% (2021); Filipino citizens/passports held: 52,401 (England and Wales only, 2021); Ethnic Filipinos: Filipinos in Asian ethnic group: 162,138; Filipinos in Other ethnic group: 13,469 (England and Wales only, 2021); 200,000 (2007 estimate)

Regions with significant populations
- London, English Midlands, North West England, South East England

Languages
- British English, Philippine English, Filipino (Tagalog), Other Filipino languages

Religion
- Predominantly Roman Catholicism; Irreligion · Protestantism · Islam · Buddhism ·

Related ethnic groups
- Filipino people, Overseas Filipinos

Filipinos in the United Kingdom (Filipino: mga Pilipino sa Reyno Unido) are British citizens or immigrants who are of Filipino ancestry.

== Demographics ==
=== Population ===
A map showing the distribution of Filipinos in Greater London. 40% of British Filipinos live in London. 0.0%-0.99% 1%-1.49% 1.5%-1.99% 2%-2.49% 2.5%-2.99% 3% and greater

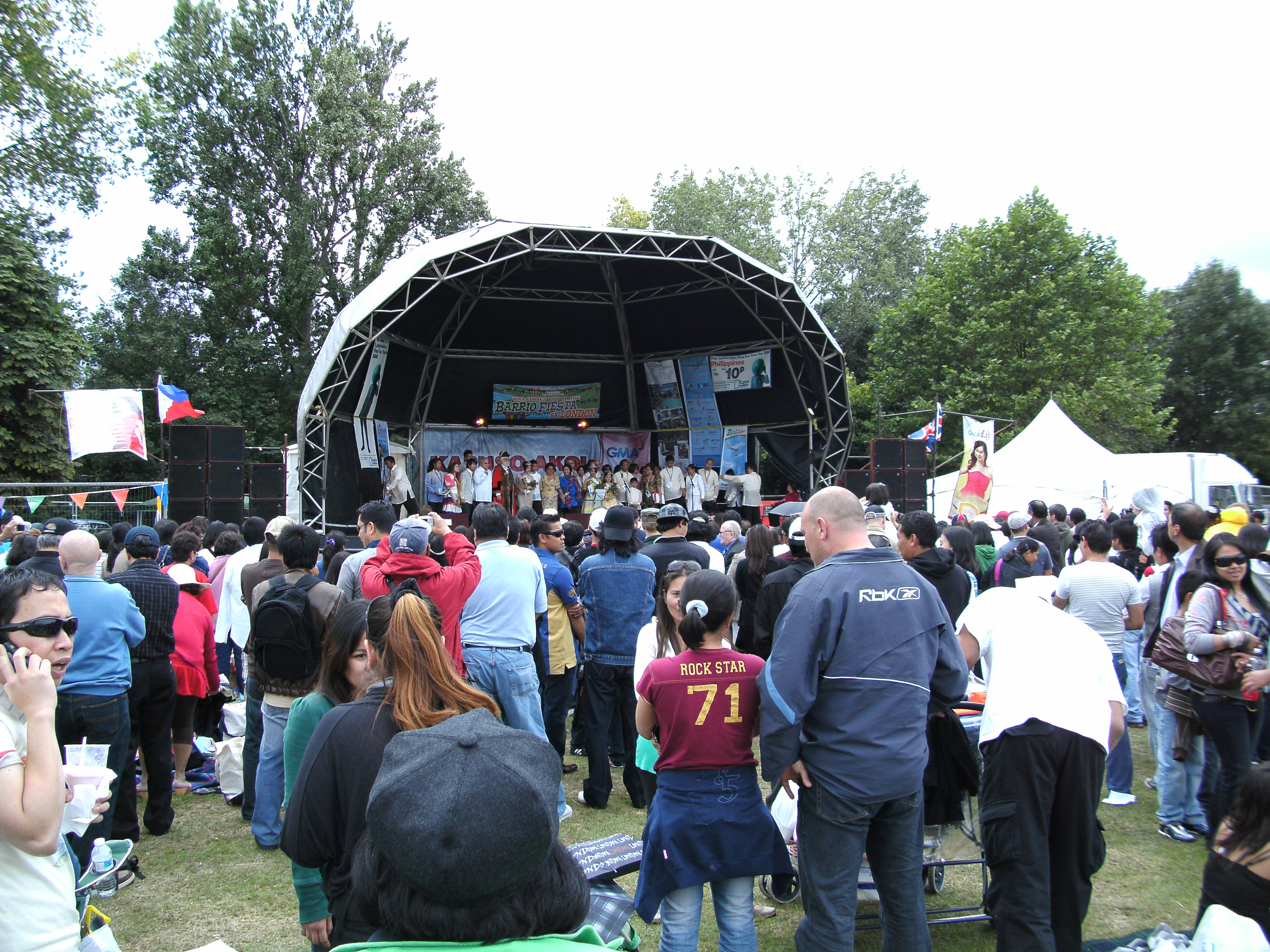
'Barrio Fiesta sa London', a Filipino-British festival, in 2009.

The 2001 UK Census recorded 40,118 people born in the Philippines. The 2011 census recorded 117,457 people born in the Philippines resident in England, 5,168 in Wales, 4,264 in Scotland and 2,947 in Northern Ireland, making a total of 129,836. The Office for National Statistics estimates that, in 2015, the equivalent figure was 132,000.

According to The Manila Times, there were approximately 200,000 Filipinos living in the United Kingdom in 2007. In 2007, 10,840 Filipinos gained British citizenship, the second largest number of any nation after India, compared to only 1,385 in 2001.

=== Distribution ===
The largest Filipino community in the United Kingdom is in and around London, based around Earl's Court. Filipinos also account for the largest foreign-born population in the London Borough of Sutton. Other towns and cities with significant Filipino communities include Birmingham, Liverpool, Manchester, Bristol, Leeds, Southampton, Worthing, Gloucester and Barrow-in-Furness, which is home to a sizeable flourishing Filipino community. Fiestas are held during June, July and August in various cities throughout the UK.

=== Economics ===
According to the Institute for Public Policy Research, 85.4 per cent of new immigrant Filipinos to the UK of working age are employed (as opposed to inactive - a category which includes students - or unemployed), with 12.8% being low earners (people making less than £149.20 a week – half the UK median wage) and 0.61 per cent are high earners (people earning more than £750 a week). 78% of settled Filipino immigrants to the UK are employed, with 15.4% being low earners and 1.28 per cent being high earners. In 2020, 18,500 Filipinos were employed by the National Health Service; as of April 2020, of NHS workers who have died of COVID-19, 20% were Filipino. University Hospitals Sussex celebrated 25 years of recruiting staff from the Philippines in summer of 2025, and employed 913 Filipino staff at the time.

== Culture and community ==
=== Community groups ===
Filipino community groups in the UK include:

1. Aguman Kapampangan United Kingdom was founded in 1994 March 14,
1. Kanlungan, a registered charity which is a consortium of grassroots community organisations working closely together for the welfare and interests of migrants, refugees, diaspora communities from the Philippines and Southeast Asia living in the UK.
2. The Centre for Filipinos, a Filipino advocacy and outreach charity;
3. Lahing Kayumanggi dance company focusing on traditional Filipino dance;
4. EA Doce Pares, an Eskrima/Arnis school promoting and educating the community on the Philippine warrior arts and culture;
5. Phil-UK, a group for young and second-generation Filipinos in the UK;
6. Philippine Generations, a Second Generation led not for profit Organisation promoting the Philippines, its people and culture in the UK;
7. The Philippine Centre, a charity promoting culture and community spirit.
8. One Filipino is a group supporting local Filipino organisations in the United Kingdom and also to promote the campaign towards good governance and Filipino empowerment.
9. Creative Hearts United, is a charitable organisation with a rich history of supporting arts and cultural endeavours, cultivating talent to enhance the well-being of the Filipino community in West Yorkshire and the surrounding areas.
10. Filipino Women's Association UK (FWA UK), a not for profit, charitable organisation providing support to vulnerable women and children in the Philippines.
11. Handog Natin Charity UK, a Coventry-based registered charity organisation conducting mission projects in the Philippines for disaster relief, medical, educational and livelihood programs. It also serves as a communication hub for Filipinos living and working in Coventry and surrounding areas.

The 'Barrio Fiesta sa London', a two-day annual festival formerly held in Lampton Park, Hounslow, West London, is perhaps the best known and largest gathering for the community in the UK, which was launched in 1985. Since then, smaller versions of the festival have been held at various locations across the UK, with the original festival receiving well over 30,000 visitors in a single day. It is organised and run by The Philippine Centre but draws Filipino community groups and businesses from all over the UK. The Barrio Fiesta sa London moved location in 2013 and is now held in Apps Court Farm, Walton-on-Thames.

== See also ==
- British East and Southeast Asian
- Philippines - United Kingdom relations
