= Manhunt International =

Male Model Search, international male pageant competition

- Type: Male Model Search
- Headquarters: Gold Coast, Australia
- First edition: 1993; 33 years ago
- Most recent edition: 2026
- Current titleholder: Dylan Palmerini; France
- President: Rosko Dickinson
- Language: English
- Website: manhunt.international

Manhunt International is a prominent international male model search for the next Male Supermodel, founded in 1993. The competition's roots trace back a few years earlier, when a single national preliminary was held in Singapore. The competition was conceived by Metromedia Singapore and Procon Leisure International, which became co-partners in 1993.

The current titleholder, Manhunt International 2026 Dylan Palmerini of France, was crowned in Colombo, Sri Lanka on 9 September 2026, clinching the first back-to-back victory in the pageant’s history.

== History ==
Manhunt International is recognized as one of the first international pageants and competitions for men. The Manhunt International Organization was established in 1993 through a partnership between Rosko Dickinson of Australia and Alex Liu of Singapore, with the aim of providing men a platform to present their talents and skills.

The inaugural Manhunt International World Final took place in Australia in 1993 with 25 contestants, and the title was won by Thomas Sasse of Germany. The event remained on Australia's Gold Coast, where Nikos Papadakis of Greece won in 1994. Rosko Dickinson and Alex Liu began their co-ownership and management of Manhunt International in 1993, a partnership that lasted until Liu's passing in January 2018.

Manhunt International is a male modeling competition aimed at showcasing talent within the fashion industry. The event includes activities such as outdoor challenges, public presentations, and talent showcases. Participants are assessed on criteria including runway performance, photogenic qualities, personality, and physical attributes. The competition also seeks to introduce new talent to the modeling and fashion industry and encourages participants to act as role models for younger generations.

Manhunt International is one of the longest-running international male model contests. It is a global competition that seeks to identify talented male models. The contest saw its highest participation in 2006 and 2012, held in China and Thailand, respectively.

Several countries have hosted the world finals, including Australia (1993, 1994, 1998, 2018), Singapore (1995, 1997, 2000), the Philippines (1999, 2020, 2022), China (2001, 2002, 2006, 2016), South Korea (2005, 2007, 2008, 2011), Taiwan (2010), Thailand (2012, 2017, 2024, 2025), and Sri Lanka (2026).

== Eligibility criteria ==
Sex	Male
Age range	18 to 32
Marital status	Married or Single
Height	At least 1.75 metres / 5'9"
Skills	Remarkable communication skills, modelling experience
Additional attributes	Photogenic, fit, pleasing character

== Competition ==
The Manhunt competition is staged in two rounds: preliminary and final. During the preliminaries, the contestants are judged in Haute Couture Fashion, Swimwear, and Formal Evening Wear. The contestants with the highest scores are named as finalists, from whom the judges determine the winner and runners-up.

During the finals, several other awards are given in addition to the ultimate title of Manhunt International: Best Runway Model, Mister Photogenic, Mister Friendship, Mister Personality, Mister Physique, and Mister Popularity (voted by the public via social media). Since the 2005 edition, Manhunt International has also awarded five continental titles to the best representatives of each continent. In the 2007 edition, it was announced that the winner of Mister Popularity would automatically advance to the final round, and in 2022, a new category was introduced called Digital Challenge (Video), with three segments: Runway Challenge, Swimwear/Physique, and Casting Challenge. Once again, the overall winner of the category advanced straight to the Top 20.

30th anniversary

On this occasion, the final ten were awarded as runners-up.

== Titleholders ==
Edition	Year	Date	Manhunt International	Runners-Up				Location	No.	Ref.
Edition	Year	Date	Manhunt International	First	Second	Third	Fourth	Location	No.	Ref.
1st	1993	November 30, 1993	Thomas Sasse; Germany	Berke Hürcan; Turkey	Raffaele Memoli; Switzerland	Aaron Small; Philippines	Michel Boeuf; New Caledonia	Gold Coast, Australia	24	
2nd	1994	November, 1994	Nikos Papadakis; Greece	Trent Garfthon; Australia	Richard Planks; United States	Benedict Goh Wei Cheh; Singapore	Rajat Bedi; India	Gold Coast, Australia	24	
3rd	1995	November 24, 1995	Albe Geldenhuys; South Africa	Dino Morea; India	David Arnold; United States	Javier Rodriguez; Puerto Rico	Rinat Khismatouli; Kazakhstan	Sentosa Island, Singapore	35	
4th	1997	May 24, 1997	Jason Erceg; New Zealand	Sandro Finocchio Speranza; Venezuela	Vincent Pinto; Philippines	Jonathan Rojas Ortega; Puerto Rico	Zulfi Syed Ahmad; India	Singapore	38	
5th	1998	May 3, 1998	Peter Eriksen; Sweden	Tamme Boh Tjarks; Germany	Robert Korceki; United States	Philip Lee; Singapore	Rets Renemaris; Latvia	Gold Coast, Australia	34	
6th	1999	May 29, 1999	Juan Ernesto Calzadilla Regalado; Venezuela	John Abraham; India	Peter Kerby; Denmark	Kirk Hedley; Jamaica	Llewellyn Cordier; South Africa	Manila, Philippines	43	
7th	2000	September 29, 2000	Brett Wilson; Australia	David Zepeda Quintero; Mexico	Brandon Choo; Singapore	José Gabriel Madonía Panepinto; Venezuela	Geraldino Nicolina; Curaçao	Singapore	33	
8th	2001	November 12, 2001	Rajeev Singh; India	Leo Zhang Wei Biao; China	Luis Antonio Nery Gómez; Venezuela	Adnan Taletovic; Croatia	Kenneth Bryan; Cayman Islands	Beijing, China	43	
9th	2002	November 9, 2002	Fabrice Bertrand Wattez; France	Bart Deschuymer; Belgium	Murat Erbaytan; Turkey	Adrian Medina Scull; Cuba	Daniel Leonard Navarrete Muktans; Venezuela	Shanghai, China	47	
10th	2005	September 8, 2005	Tolgahan Sayışman; Turkey	Agris Blaubuks; Latvia	Henry Romero; Curaçao	Chen ZeYu; China	Romeo Quiñones; Puerto Rico	Busan, Korea	42	
11th	2006	April 19, 2006	Jaime Augusto Mayol; United States	Fabien Hauquier; Belgium	Zhao Zheng; China	Gökhan Keser; Turkey	Jose Mendez; Spain	Jinjiang, China	53	
12th	2007	February 12, 2007	Jeffrey Zheng Yu Guang; China	Jason Charles Millot; Canada	Ioannis Athitakis; Greece	Craig Barnett; Australia	Abhimanyu Jain; India	Gangwon, Korea	48	
13th	2008	June 2, 2008	Abdelmoumen El Maghraouy; Morocco	Egill Arnljots; Sweden	Cesar Vegas; Costa Rica	Lee Jae-Hwan; South Korea	Claudio Furtado; Angola	Seoul, Korea	47	
14th	2010	November 20, 2010	Peter Meňky; Slovakia	Bogdan Brasoveanu; Gibraltar	Marlon de Gregori; Brazil	Daniel Guerra; United States	Jerry Chang; Taiwan	Taichung, Taiwan	50	
15th	2011	October 10, 2011	John Chen Jiang Feng; China	Nelson Omar Sterling; Dominican Republic	Gianni Sinnesael; Belgium	Trương Nam Thành; Vietnam	Martin Smahel; Slovakia	Seoul, Korea	48	
16th	2012	November 9, 2012	June Macasaet; Philippines	Bo Peter Jonsson; Sweden	Martin Wang; Macau	Jimmy Perez Rivera; Puerto Rico	Jason Chee; Singapore	Bangkok, Thailand	53	
17th	2016	October 29, 2016	Patrik Sjöö; Sweden	Ba Te Er; Hong Kong	Christopher Bramell; England	Maurício Eusébio; Angola	Ramon Pissaia; Brazil	Shenzhen, China	43	
18th	2017	November 27, 2017	Trương Ngọc Tình; Vietnam	Kongnat Choeisuwan; Thailand	Gaetan Osman; Lebanon	Mohamed Wazeem; Sri Lanka	Andry Permadi; Indonesia	Bangkok, Thailand	37	
19th	2018	December 2, 2018	Vicent Llorach González; Spain	Dale Maher; Australia	Luca Derin; Netherlands	Jeffrey Langan; Philippines	Mai Tuấn Anh; Vietnam	Gold Coast, Australia	28	
20th	2020	February 22, 2020	Paul Luzineau; Netherlands	Nikos Antonopoulos; Greece	Matheus Cruz Giora; Brazil	Yeray Hidalgo Hernández; Spain	Mayur Gangwani; India	Manila, Philippines	36	
21st	2022	October 1, 2022	Lochlan Carey; Australia	Joshua Raphael De Sequera; Philippines	Elijah Van Zanten; United States	Trần Mạnh Kiên; Vietnam	Cas Hagman; Netherlands	Manila, Philippines	33	
22nd	2024	May 26, 2024	Kevin Aphisittinun Len Dasom; Thailand	Lucas Schlachter; France	Kenneth Stromsnes; Philippines	Víctor Michele Battista Infante; Venezuela	Vincenzo Melisi; Italy	Ayutthaya, Thailand	37	
23rd	2025	June 10, 2025	Adonis Renaud; France	Piyumal Sithum; Sri Lanka	Rhyeme Wright; Jamaica	Jordan San Juan; Philippines	Nguyễn Vũ Linh; Vietnam	Bangkok, Thailand	37	
24th	2026	September 9, 2026	Dylan Palmerini; France	Nipun Singh; India	Lucas Diaz; Puerto Rico	Samuel Ayeloja; Nigeria	Trần Tiến Dũng; Vietnam	Colombo, Sri Lanka	35	

Fifth to Ninth Runners-up

Since 2024, the Manhunt International pageant has awarded the Top 10 finalists with 5th to 9th runner-up titles. This table lists the names of the 5th to 9th runners-up by year.

Edition	Year	Date	Runners-Up					Location	No.	Ref.
Edition	Year	Date	Fifth	Sixth	Seventh	Eighth	Ninth	Location	No.	Ref.
22nd	2024	May 26, 2024	Daniel Lorente; Spain	Matt Dixon; Canada	Marcel Riera; Switzerland	Ruan Mendes; Brazil	Luke Van; South Africa	Ayutthaya, Thailand	37	
23nd	2025	June 10, 2025	José Carlos Novelo; Mexico	Özkan Görmez; Turkey	Yu Gan; Myanmar	Somto Nnoruga; Nigeria	Kamonpop Kaewdiao; Thailand	Bangkok, Thailand	37	
24th	2026	September 9, 2026	Isanka Pramuditha; Sri Lanka	Leandro Mendoza; Dominican Republic	Darío Meroño; Spain	William Sin Kyu; South Korea	Osdany Garcia; Cuba	Colombo, Sri Lanka	35	

=== Gallery of winners ===
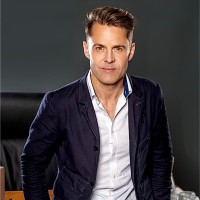
Manhunt International 1995
Albe Geldenhuys
South Africa

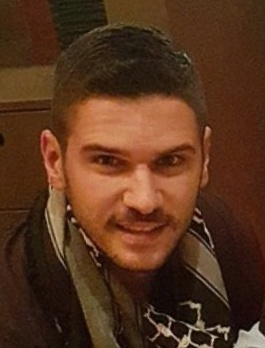
Manhunt International 2005
Tolgahan Sayışman
Turkey

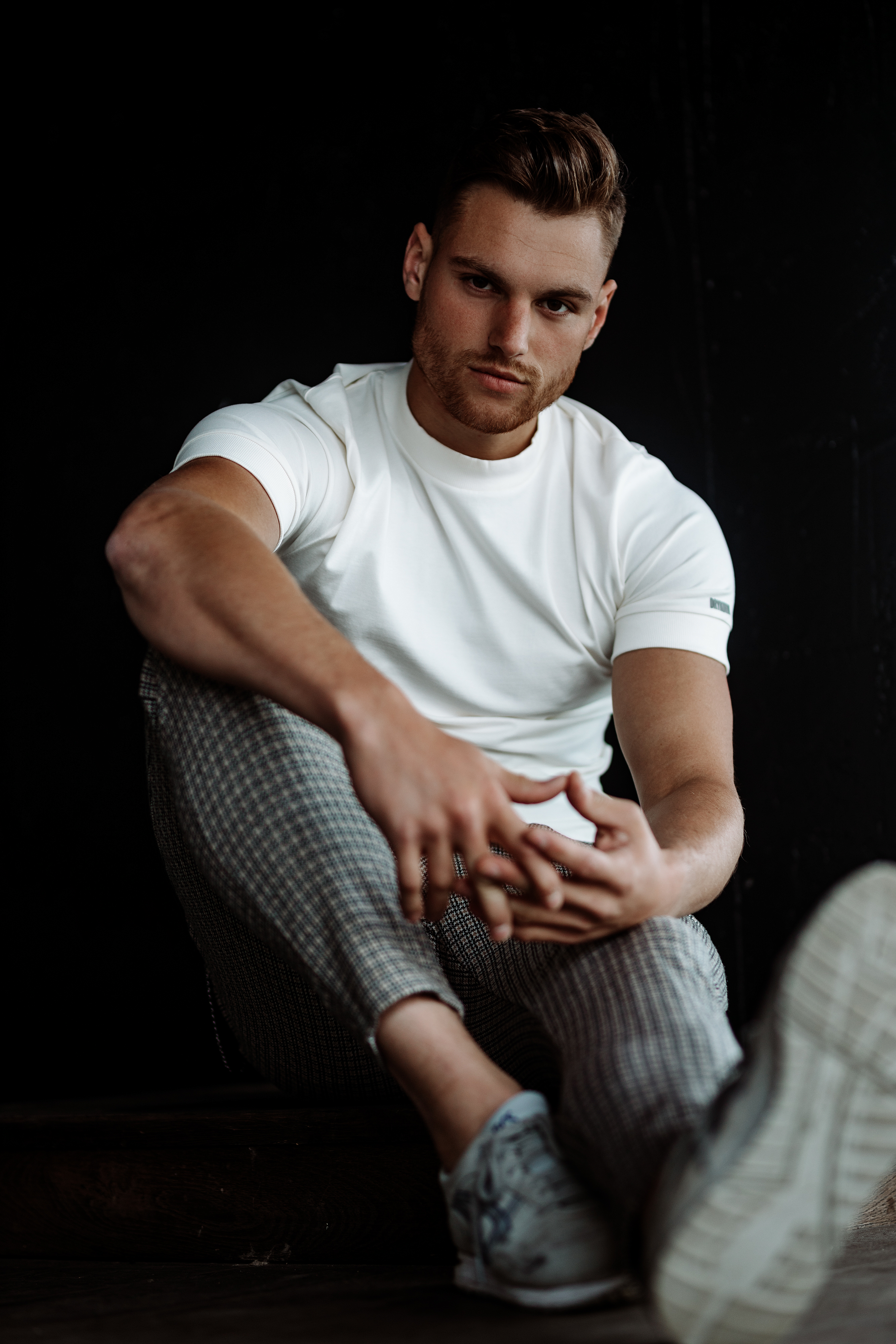
Manhunt International 2020
Paul Luzineau
Netherlands

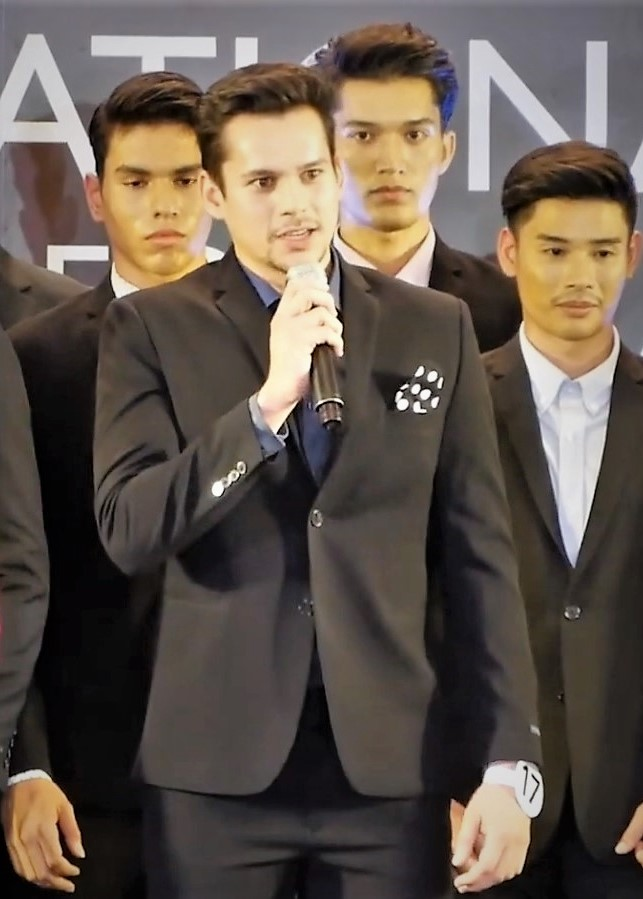
Manhunt International 2024
Kevin Dasom
Thailand

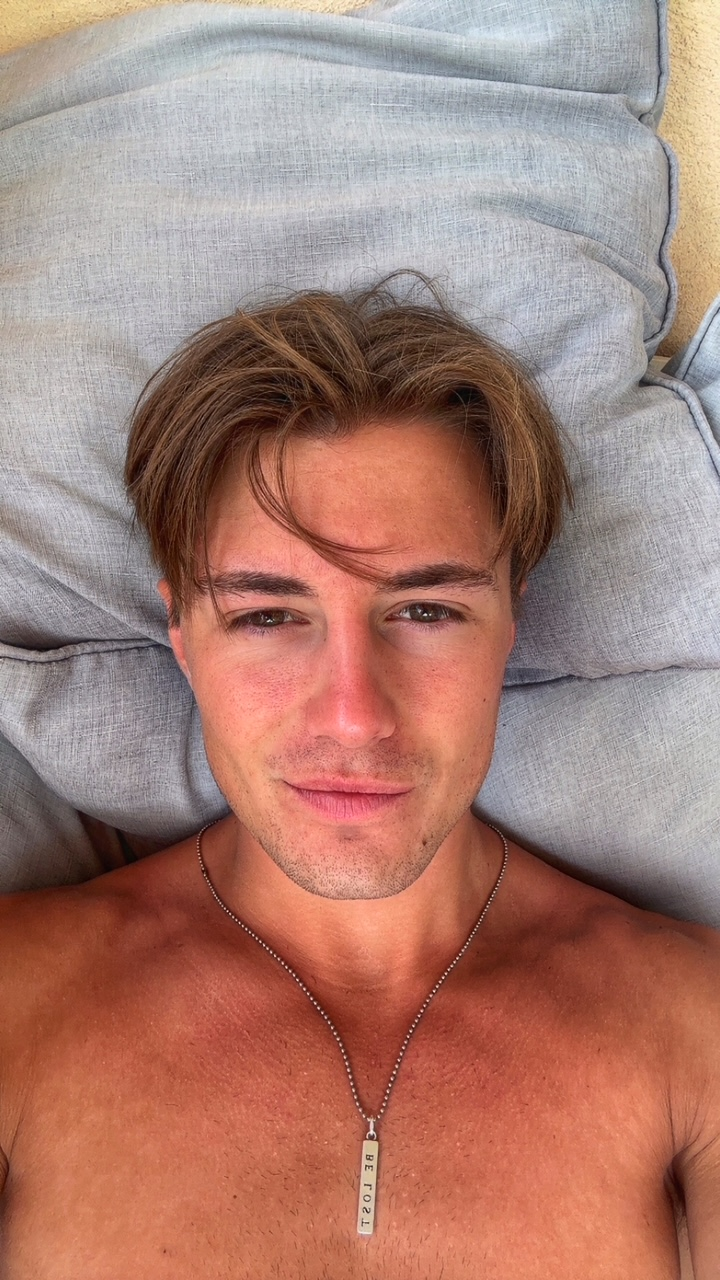
Manhunt International 2025
Adonis Renaud
France

=== Country by number of wins ===
Country	Titles	Year
France	3	2002, 2025, 2026
Australia	2	2000, 2022
Sweden	2	1998, 2016
China	2	2007, 2011
Thailand	1	2024
Netherlands	1	2020
Spain	1	2018
Vietnam	1	2017
Philippines	1	2012
Slovakia	1	2010
Morocco	1	2008
United States	1	2006
Turkey	1	2005
India	1	2001
Venezuela	1	1999
New Zealand	1	1997
South Africa	1	1995
Greece	1	1994
Germany	1	1993

=== Continents by number of wins ===
Continent	Titles	Years
Europe	10	1993, 1994, 1998, 2002, 2010, 2016, 2018, 2020, 2025, 2026
Asia	7	2001, 2005, 2007, 2011, 2012, 2017, 2024
Oceania	3	1997, 2000, 2022
Africa	2	1995, 2008
Americas	2	1999, 2006

=== Countries/Territories ranking statistics ===
Rank	Country	#Wins	#1ST R.U.s	#2ND R.U.s	#3RD R.U.s	#4TH R.U.s
1	France	3	1	0	0	0
2	Australia	2	2	0	1	0
3	Sweden	2	2	0	0	0
4	China	2	1	1	1	0
5	India	1	3	0	0	4
6	Philippines	1	1	2	3	0
7	Venezuela	1	1	1	2	1
8	Turkey	1	1	1	1	0
9	Greece	1	1	1	0	0
9	Germany	1	1	0	0	0
9	Thailand	1	1	0	0	0
10	United States	1	0	4	1	0
11	Netherlands	1	0	1	0	1
12	Vietnam	1	0	0	2	2
13	Spain	1	0	0	1	1
14	Slovakia	1	0	0	0	1
14	South Africa	1	0	0	0	1
15	Morocco	1	0	0	0	0
15	New Zealand	1	0	0	0	0
16	Belgium	0	2	1	0	0
17	Sri Lanka	0	1	0	1	0
17	Latvia	0	1	0	0	1
18	Mexico	0	1	0	0	0
18	Canada	0	1	0	0	0
18	Dominican Republic	0	1	0	0	0
18	Gibraltar	0	1	0	0	0
18	Hong Kong	0	1	0	0	0
19	Brazil	0	0	2	0	1
20	Singapore	0	0	1	2	1
21	Jamaica	0	0	1	1	0
21	Curacao	0	0	1	0	1
22	Costa Rica	0	0	1	0	0
22	Denmark	0	0	1	0	0
22	England	0	0	1	0	0
22	Lebanon	0	0	1	0	0
22	Macau	0	0	1	0	0
22	Switzerland	0	0	1	0	0
23	Puerto Rico	0	0	0	3	1
24	Angola	0	0	0	1	1
25	Croatia	0	0	0	1	0
25	Cuba	0	0	0	1	0
25	Korea	0	0	0	1	0
26	Italy	0	0	0	0	1
26	Cayman Islands	0	0	0	0	1
26	Indonesia	0	0	0	0	1
26	Kazakhstan	0	0	0	0	1
26	New Caledonia	0	0	0	0	1
26	Taiwan	0	0	0	0	1

== See also ==
- Mister World
- Mister Supranational
- Man of the World
- Mister Global
