= List of Indian representatives at international male beauty pageants =

National male beauty pageant competition in India

India selects its delegates for international male beauty pageants through several national competitions held throughout the year. Winners and runners-up from these events are sent to represent the nation at various prestigious international competitions.

Currently, three primary national pageants stand out: Times Mister India, Rubaru Mister India, and Mister Supranational India. Each selects contestants through their own processes, culminating in the coronation of winners and runners-up.

These national titles serve as gateways to various international platforms. Winners and runners-up may compete in renowned pageants like Mister World, Mister Supranational, Mister International, Mister Global, Manhunt International, and Man of the World, alongside several other prominent regional events.

== History ==
=== Early years and franchise development (1994–2012) ===
The inaugural Mister India World pageant (1994), organized by Adonis-Graviera, selected Bikram Saluja as India's representative for the first-ever Mister World in 1996. The same year (1994), the Gladrags Manhunt and Megamodel Contest chose Rajat Bedi to represent India at the inaugural Manhunt International, where he achieved the 4th Runner-Up placement. Graviera continued to organize the Mister India World pageant, with Sachin Khurana winning the 1998 edition and representing India at the international competition. Grasim Mr. India acquired the franchise for Mister World in 1994, holding it until 2007. They returned as franchise holders from 2010 to 2012, during which they actively sent delegates to the international pageant. Haywards 5000 briefly held the franchise ownership in 2007, sending Kawaljit Anand Singh to Mister World.

=== Ownership transition and recent developments (since 2014) ===
The Times Group acquired the rights to send India's representatives to Mister World in 2014, continuing the legacy established by previous franchise holders. In 2023, a new national organization named Mister Supranational India, led by Himadri Bhatnagar, acquired the rights to send a representative to Mister Supranational 2023. Their first delegate, Raj Sunil Singh, participated in the 2023 pageant but did not advance to the semi-finals, marking the end of India's consecutive placements at the competition since its inaugural edition in 2016.

Winners of major international Beauty pageant
Pageant	Titles	Winning year(s)	Winner(s)
Mister World	1		
Mister World	1	2016	Rohit Khandelwal
Mister Supranational	1		
Mister Supranational	1	2018	Prathamesh Maulingkar
Manhunt International	1		
Manhunt International	1	2001	Rajeev Singh
Mister Global	1		
Mister Global	1	2023	Jason Dylan Bretfelean

== Representatives to major beauty pageants ==
Color key

- Declared as Winner
- Ended as Runner-up
- Ended as one of the Finalists or Semi-finalists
- Competitions to be held/awaiting result

=== Manhunt International ===
Representatives to Manhut International is being sent by Gladrags organisation through Gladrags Manhunt and Megamodel Contest.

Year	Delegate	State	International Placement & Performance	
Year	Delegate	State	Placements	Special award(s)
1994	Rajat Bedi	Punjab	4th Runner-Up	
1995	Dino Morea	Karnataka	1st Runner-Up	
1997	Zulfi Syed Ahmad	Karnataka	4th Runner-Up	
1998	Balbir Meena	Rajasthan	Unplaced	
1999	John Abraham	Maharashtra	1st Runner-Up	
2000	Reji Varghese	Andhra Pradesh	Unplaced	
2001	Rajeev Singh	Rajasthan	Manhunt International 2001	2 Special Awards: Best National Costume; Sharmoon Best Dressed Gentleman Award
2002	Nitin Singh	Maharashtra	Top 15	
2005	Pawan Setpal	Maharashtra	Unplaced	1 Special Award: Mister Photogenic
2006	Aryan Baruah	Maharashtra	Top 15	1 Special Award: Mister Personality
2007	Abhimanyu Jain	Rajasthan	4th Runner-Up	
2008	Romeo Gates	New Delhi	Top 15	1 Special Award: Mister Internet Popularity
2010	Ahran Chaudhary	Uttar Pradesh	Top 16	1 Special Award: Mister Internet Popularity
2011	Shashvat Seth	Maharashtra	Unplaced	
2012	Arry Dabas	Haryana	Top 16	1 Special Award: Mister Photogenic
2016	Grewal Gurmehar	New Delhi	Unplaced	
2017	Takshanin Ram	Maharashtra	Unplaced	1 Special Award: Best Participant Award
2018	Prasad Cariappa	Karnataka	Unplaced	
2020	Mayur Gangwani	Karnataka	4th Runner-Up	
2022	Rakesh Nongmaithem	Manipur	Unplaced	
2024	Jomin D'souza	Maharashtra	Unplaced	
2026	Nipun Singh	Madhya Pradesh	1st Runner-Up	
2027	Pradhaan Ragava	Tamil Nadu	TBA	

Note – No pageant held in the years: 2015, 2014, 2013, 2009, 2004, 2003 and 1996

=== Mister World ===
Year	Delegate	State	International Placement & Performance	
Year	Delegate	State	Placements	Special award(s)
1996	Bikram Saluja	Punjab	Top 10	
1998	Sachin Khurana	New Delhi	Unplaced	
2007	Kawaljit Anand Singh	Assam	Top 12	
2010	Inder Bajwa	Karnataka	Top 15	2 Special Awards: Top 20 – Mister World Talent; Top 20 – Mister World Top Model
2012	Taher Ali	Maharashtra	Unplaced	
2014	Prateik Jain	Karnataka	Top 10	6 Special Awards: Continental King of Asia and Oceania; Winner – Shot-Put Challenge; Winner (Team) – The Tug-O-War; 1st Runner-Up – Mister Multimedia; Top 21 – Talent Round; Top 24 – Extreme Sports
2016	Rohit Khandelwal	Telangana	Mister World 2016	1 Special Award: Winner – Mister Multimedia
2019	Vishnu Raj Menon	Kerala	Unplaced	1 Special Award: 2nd Runner-Up – Mister Multimedia
2024	Gokul Ganesan	Tamil Nadu	Top 10	5 Special Awards: Top 5 – Multimedia Challenge; Top 5 – Top Model; Top 20 – Head-to-Head Challenge; Top 30 – Beauty With a Purpose; Top 36 – Talent Round
2026	Shevam Singh	Bihar	TBA	

=== Mister International (Thailand) ===
Year	Delegate	State	International Placement & Performance	
Year	Delegate	State	Placements	Special award(s)
2006	Sudhir Tewari	New Delhi	Unplaced	
2007	Nikhil Dharwan	New Delhi	Top 10	
2008	Vikas Mehandroo	New Delhi	Top 15	
2009	Imran Khan	New Delhi	Unplaced	
2010	Akash Charan	Rajasthan	Unplaced	
2012	Opangtongdang Jamir	Nagaland	Unplaced	
2013	Hukapa Chakhesang	Nagaland	Unplaced	
2014	Parmeet Wahi	Maharashtra	Unplaced	
2015	Halley Laithangbam	Manipur	Unplaced	1 Special Award: Top 10 – Best National Costume
2016	Mudit Malhotra	New Delhi	Top 9	
2017	Darasing Khurana	Maharashtra	Unplaced	
2018	Balaji Murugadoss	Tamil Nadu	Unplaced	
2022	Lukanand Kshetrimayum	Manipur	1st Runner-Up	
2023	Shashwat Dwivedi	Uttar Pradesh	Top 5	1 Special Award: Mister Smart Guy
2024	Vishnu Choudhary	Rajasthan	Unplaced	
2025	Madhuram Daga	West Bengal	Top 20	
2026	Aaryan Chawla	Daman and Diu	Unplaced	

Note: No pageant held in the years: 2019 – 2021 and no delegate was sent in 2011

=== Mister Global ===
Year	Delegate	State	International Placement & Performance	
Year	Delegate	State	Placements	Special award(s)
2015	Sandeep Sehrawat	New Delhi	Unplaced	
2016	Prateek Baid	Rajasthan	Top 16	1 Special Award: Best Model
2017	Srikant Dwivedi	Uttar Pradesh	Top 10	
2018	Dhwrwm Swargiary	Assam	Unplaced	
2019	Rishabh Kumar	New Delhi	Unplaced	
2021	Tseteej Shiwakoty	Sikkim	Top 17	1 Special Award: Top 5 – Most Inspirational Video Award
2022	Chena Ram Choudhary	Rajasthan	Top 15	
2022	Chena Ram Choudhary	Rajasthan	Top 15	
2023	Jason Dylan Bretfelean	Telangana	Mister Global 2023	1 Special Award: Mister Body Perfect
2024	Gemin Darin	Arunachal Pradesh	Top 20	
2025	Rakesh Bhosekar	Maharashtra	Unplaced	
2026	Harshit Solanki	Uttar Pradesh	Unplaced	

=== Mister Supranational ===
Year	Delegate	State	International Placement & Performance	
Year	Delegate	State	Placements	Special award(s)
2016	Jitesh Naresh Thakur	Rajasthan	2nd Runner-Up	3 Special Awards: Mister Supranational Asia; Winner – Top Model; 3rd Runner-Up – Mister Mobstar
2017	Altamash Faraz	New Delhi	Top 10	4 Special Awards: Mister Supranational Asia & Oceania; 1st Runner-Up – Best in Swimsuit; 1st Runner-Up – Extreme Race; 3rd Runner-Up – Best in Street-Wear
2018	Prathamesh Maulingkar	Goa	Mister Supranational 2018	2 Special Awards: Winner – Best Body; Winner – Mister Social Media
2019	Varun Verma	New Delhi	Top 10	3 Special Awards: Mister Supranational Asia; Top 10 – Digital Influencer; Top 10 – Mister Supra Fan Vote
2021	Rahul Rajasekharan Nair	Kerala	Top 10	4 Special Awards: Mister Supranational Asia; Winner – Mister Supra Chat; Top 10 – Digital Influencer; Top 10 – Mister Supra Fan Vote
2023	Raj Singh	Maharashtra	Unplaced	1 Special Award: Winner – Mister Talent
2024	Aman Rajesh Singh	Tamilnadu	Unplaced	
2025	Shubham Sharma	Maharashtra	Top 20	2 Special Awards: Winner – Mister Influencer Opportunity; Top 10 – Supra Model of the Year
2026	Abel Biju	Kerala	Top 20	2 Special Awards: Winner – Mister YouTube Supra-Influencer; Top 10 – Mister Supra Influencer

Note – No pageant held in the year 2022

=== Man of the World ===
Year	Delegate	State	International Placement & Performance	
Year	Delegate	State	Placements	Special award(s)
2018	Joshua Roshan Chhabra	Maharashtra	Top 17	2 Special Awards: (gold) Best in Fashion of the World; (bronze) Best in Talent
2019	Krishna Salak	Chandigarh	Top 10	2 Special Awards: (gold) Mister Photogenic; (bronze) Best in National Costume
2022	Aditya Khurana	Delhi	Man of the World 2022	1 Special Award: (bronze) Best in Beachwear
2023	Baskar Dhanasekar	Tamil Nadu	Unplaced	1 Special Award: (bronze) Mister Personality
2024	Ved Bharambe	Maharashtra	Top 10	2 Special Awards: (gold) Best in National Costume; (bronze) Best in Swimwear
2025	Azhan Memon	Madhya Pradesh	Unplaced	1 Special Award: (gold) Man of the World Charity
2026	Moha Kiran	Karnataka	Unplaced	1 Special Award: (bronze) Mister Photogenic; Finalist – Best in Formal Wear; Finalist – Fashion of the World; Finalist – Mister Personality

Note – No pageant held in the years: 2020, 2021

== Representatives to other beauty pageants ==
=== Mister Continental World ===
Year	Delegate	State	International Placement & Performance	
Year	Delegate	State	Placements	Special award(s)
2025	Syed Abubakkar	Karnataka	1st Runner-up	
2026	Karnajit Ningthoujam	Manipur	Mister Continental World 2026	

=== Mister Eco International ===
Year	Delegate	State	International Placement & Performance	
Year	Delegate	State	Placements	Special award(s)
2026	Nawang Dondup	Arunachal Pradesh	4th Runner-up	1 Special Award: Best Eco Video

=== Mister Tourism World ===
Year	Delegate	State	International Placement & Performance	
Year	Delegate	State	Placements	Special award(s)
2016	Sanju Ray	Assam	Unplaced	
2017	Kunal Arora	New Delhi	Unplaced	
2018	Zulfi Aziz SK	Assam	Unplaced	
2021	Shouryaditya Singh	Jharkhand	2nd Runner-Up	
2022	Mithun Debbarma	Tripura	Top 17	
2023	Mukesh Ravi	Tamil Nadu	Did not participate	
2024	Sriloganand Kumar	Tamil Nadu	Top 10	
2025	Abhinav Anil Ballary	Telangana	4th Runner-Up	
2026	Piyush Lalwani	Rajasthan	TBA	

=== Mister Glam International ===
Year	Delegate	State	International Placement & Performance	
Year	Delegate	State	Placements	Special award(s)
2019	Mithun Debbarma	Tripura	Unplaced	
2022	Rishi Bodke Venkatesh	Karnataka	Unplaced	1 Special Award: Mister Glam Asia
2023	Vyasan A Nair	Kerala	3rd Runner-Up	3 Special Awards: Pageantry King; Mister Popularity; Mister Super Model
2024	Viraaj Babbar	Madhya Pradesh	1st Runner-Up	1 Special Award: Mister Popular
2025	Manjoy Bhattacharya	Maharashtra	Top 7	1 Special Award: Brand Ambassador
2026	Aryan Singh	Uttar Pradesh	TBA	

Note – No pageant held in 2020 and no delegate was sent in 2021

=== Mister Friendship International ===
Year	Delegate	State	International Placement & Performance	
Year	Delegate	State	Placements	Special award(s)
2022	Songashim Rungsung	Manipur	2nd Runner-Up	
2023	Daksh Chaudhary	New Delhi	3rd Runner-Up	1 Special Award: Mister Popular
2024	Saurabh Prabhudessai	Goa	Unplaced	
2025	Biswajit Roy	Sikkim	Unplaced	

=== Mister Model International ===
Year	Delegate	State	International Placement & Performance	
Year	Delegate	State	Placements	Special award(s)
2014	Dhwrwm Swargiary	Punjab	4th Runner-Up	
2015	Phany Padaraju	Maharashtra	1st Runner-Up	
2016	Anurag Fageriya	Rajasthan	Top 16	
2018	Mohit Sharma	Himanchal Pradesh	Unplaced	1 Special Award: Best Model Asia Pacific
2019	Dalton Dsouza	Goa	Unplaced	
2021	Armaan Hakim	Maharashtra	3rd Runner-Up	2 Special Awards: Top 3 – Best Headshot; Top 16 – Best Internet Model
2025	Abhishek Yadav	Maharashtra	Unplaced	
2026	Sarang Nagpure	Maharashtra	TBA	

Note – No pageant held in the years 2017, 2022, 2023 and no delegate sent in 2024

=== Mister National Universe ===
Year	Delegate	State	International Placement & Performance	
Year	Delegate	State	Placements	Special award(s)
2017	Pankaj Ahlawat	New Delhi	Mister National Universe 2017	2 Special Awards: Winner – People's Choice Award; Winner – So Cool Guy Award
2018	Farhan Qureshii	Madhya Pradesh	Top 5	
2019	Vikash Usham	Manipur	Mister National Universe 2019	
2019	Sahil Arora	Gujarat	Unplaced	
2022	Bharat Bhushan	New Delhi	3rd Runner-Up	1 Special Award: Mister National Earth
2023	Biswajit Roy	West Bengal	Unplaced	
2024	Tachang Phassang	Arunachal Pradesh	Unplaced	1 Special Award: Mister Flawless Skin
2025	Gokul Sahu	Uttar Pradesh	5th Runner-Up	1 Special Award: Mister National Universe Global Ambassador
2026	Vinay Meena	Rajasthan	Top 10	

Note – 2 editions of Mister National Universe were held in 2019

=== Caballero Universal ===
Year	Delegate	State	International Placement & Performance	
Year	Delegate	State	Placements	Special award(s)
2022	Kramik Yadav	Gujarat	2nd Runner-Up	1 Special Award: Mister Elegance
2023	Badal Bist	Karnataka	Top 15	1 Special Award: Mister Congeniality
2024	Adithya Subramanian	Tamil Nadu	2nd Runner-Up	
2025	Anantha Krishna	Kerala	2nd Runner-Up	1 Special Award: Mister Interactive
2026	Hasit Parikh	Maharashtra	Top 10	

=== Mister Gay World ===
Year	Delegate	State	International Placement & Performance	
Year	Delegate	State	Placements	Special award(s)
2011	Raul Patil	Maharashtra	Unplaced	
2013	Nolan Lewis	Maharashtra	Top 10	
2014	Sushant Divgikar	Maharashtra	Top 10	3 Special Awards: Mister Art; Mister Congeniality; People's Choice
2015	Thahir Sayer Mohammed	Maharashtra	Did not compete	
2016	Anwesh Sahoo	Odisha	Top 12	
2017	Darshan Mandhana	Maharashtra	Top 10	
2018	Samarpan Maiti	West Bengal	2nd Runner-Up	
2019	Suresh Ramdas	Karnataka	Top 10	
2020	Shyam Konnur	Maharashtra	Unplaced	
2023	Vishal pinjani	Maharashtra	Top 5	
2024	Mayur Saroj Rajput	Maharashtra	Unplaced	
2025	Nikhil Jain	Karnataka	Unplaced	1 Special Award: Best in Social Media Award
2026	Vrujen Rakesh Andhare	Goa	TBA	

Note – No pageant held in the year 2012 and no delegate sent in 2021, 2022

=== Mister International (Philippines) ===
Since the founder Alan Sim's death on October 12, 2022, two Mister International organizations emerged, with one being headquartered to Thailand led by Pradit Pradinunt and other being headquartered at Philippines led by Manuel Deldio. Manuel Deldio assumed Mister International 2022 1st Runner-Up, Lukanand Kshetrimayum from India as his Mister International 2022 and later on continued with a separate Mister International pageant.

Year	Delegate	State	International Placement & Performance	
Year	Delegate	State	Placements	Special award(s)
2022	Lukanand Kshetrimayum	Manipur	1st Runner up	
2023	Jairus Singh	Punjab	Unplaced	
2024	Adong Jamatia	Tripura	Top 16	
2025	Okram Nikhil Singh	Manipur	TBA	

== Defunct Pageants ==
The following is a list of former Indian representatives to beauty pageants that have been discontinued/de facto.

=== Top Model of the World ===
Year	Delegate	State	International Placement & Performance	
Year	Delegate	State	Placements	Special award(s)
2024	Martin Irengbam	Manipur	1st Runner-up	3 Special Awards: Best Catwalk; Best Face; Best Physique

=== Mister Grand International (Based in Philippines) ===
Year	Delegate	State	International Placement & Performance	
Year	Delegate	State	Placements	Special award(s)
2022	Nehal Patil	Goa	Top 18	
2023	Satya Vishwanadh	Karnataka	Unplaced	

=== Man of the Universe ===
Year	Delegate	State	International Placement & Performance	
Year	Delegate	State	Placements	Special award(s)
2021	Shivam Ravnit	Bihar	Man of the Universe Ambassador 2021	1 Special Award: Man of Social Media

=== Mister Grand International (Based in Brazil) ===
Year	Delegate	State	International Placement & Performance	
Year	Delegate	State	Placements	Special award(s)
2017	Debojit Batacharya	Assam	Unplaced	
2018	Lakshay Chaudhary	Delhi	Top 9	
2019	Ashwani Neeraj	New Delhi	Mister Grand International 2019	1 Special Award: Best National Costume

Note – No pageant held in the years: 2020 – 2021 and no delegate sent in 2022

=== Mister Model Worldwide ===
Year	Delegate	State	International Placement & Performance	
Year	Delegate	State	Placements	Special award(s)
2018	Suraj Dahiya	New Delhi	2nd Runner-Up	2 Special Awards: Winner – Mister Perfect Body; 2nd Runner-Up – Best National Costume
2021	Ankit Sharma	Jammu and Kashmir	No pageant held	

Note – No pageant held in the years: 2020 – 2023 and no delegate sent in 2019

=== Mister United Continents ===
Year	Delegate	State	International Placement & Performance	
Year	Delegate	State	Placements	Special award(s)
2015	Dheeraj Sharma	New Delhi	5th Runner-Up	2 Special Awards: Best in Barong; Best in Runway
2016	Mohit Singh	Haryana	Mister United Continents 2016	1 Special Award: Winner – Online Popularity Award
2017	Mitendra Meeth Darshan	Madhya Pradesh	1st Runner-Up	
2018	Pardeep Kharera	Haryana	Unplaced	1 Special Award: Finalist – Best in Swimwear
2019	Amandeep Dahiya	Haryana	Unplaced	

=== Mister Model of the World ===
Year	Delegate	State	International Placement & Performance	
Year	Delegate	State	Placements	Special award(s)
2018	Dipankar Talukdar	Assam	4th Runner-Up	1 Special Award: Mister Model Star
2019	Dinesh Choudhary	Maharashtra	Mister Model of the World 2019	2 Special Awards: Mister Herb Gold; Mister Model Confidential

=== Mister Grand International (Based in Myanmar) ===
Year	Delegate	State	International Placement & Performance	
Year	Delegate	State	Placements	Special award(s)
2018	Vatsal Kapadia	New Delhi	Top 8	
2021	Sujith Kumar	New Delhi	No pageant held	

=== Men Universe Model ===
Year	Delegate	State	International Placement & Performance	
Year	Delegate	State	Placements	Special award(s)
2008	Kiran Gill	New Delhi	Top 10	
2009	Vikas Mehandroo	New Delhi	Unplaced	1 Special Award: Best National Costume
2015	Sumit Singh	New Delhi	Top 13	
2016	Himanshu Shailey	New Delhi	Unplaced	
2018	Amit Mehra	New Delhi	Top 12	

Note – No pageant held in the years: 2010 – 2014 and no delegate sent in 2017

=== Mister Universal Ambassador ===
Year	Delegate	State	International Placement & Performance	
Year	Delegate	State	Placements	Special award(s)
2015	Jagjeet Singh	New Delhi	Top 5	
2016	Parmeet singh wahi	New Delhi	Unplaced	2 Special Awards: Top 4 – Paper Presentation; Top 16 – Beach and Land Sports
2017	Rohit Jakhar	Haryana	4th Runner-Up	2 Special Awards: Mister Universal Ambassador Asia; 1st Runner-Up – People Choice's Award
2018	Amit Om Malik	Haryana	Top 6	

Note – No delegate sent in 2019

=== Mister International (India) ===
Year	Delegate	State	International Placement & Performance	
Year	Delegate	State	Placements	Special award(s)
1998	Diwakar Pundir	Andhra Pradesh	Semi-finalist	
1999	Abhijit Sanyal	Maharashtra	2nd Runner-Up	
2000	Aryan Vaid	Maharashtra	Mister International 2000	
2001	Vivan Bhatena	Maharashtra	Top 11	
2002	Raghu Mukherjee	Karnataka	Mister International 2002	
2003	Rajneesh Duggal	New Delhi	1st Runner-Up	

Note – The pageant has not been held since 2004 and has been de facto replaced by Mister International

== See also ==
- Grasim Mr. India
- Mr. Gay India
- Femina Miss India
- List of beauty pageants
