= Mr India 2025 season 2 =

Indian beauty pageant

- Date: 21 August 2025
- Presenters: Pooja Bhamrrah
- Entertainment: DJ Ganesh; Manasi Scott
- Venue: One8 Commune, Mumbai, India
- Broadcaster: Zoom TV; TimesPlay (OTT)
- Entrants: 12
- Placements: 6
- Winner: Shevam Singh (Mister India World 2025); Abel Biju (Mister India Supranational 2026)

The Times Mister India 2025 Season 2 was the 9th edition of the Mister India competition organized by the Times Group. This is the first instance of the organization holding two editions of the competition in the same year, the previous one having taken place in February to select India's representative for Mister Supranational 2025.

The grand finale was held at One8 Commune in Juhu, Mumbai, on 21 August 2025. At the end of the event, Shevam Singh was crowned Mister India World 2025 by the outgoing titleholder, Gokul Ganesan, while Abel Biju was crowned Mister India Supranational 2026 by Shubham Sharma. Both titleholders will represent India at the upcoming editions of the Mister World and Mister Supranational pageants, respectively. Additionally, a new title, Mister Rising Star, was awarded to Shiv Chordia.

== Results ==
=== Placements ===
Color keys

- The contestant secured victory in an international pageant.
- The contestant finished as a runner-up in an international pageant.
- The contestant reached the semi-finals in an international pageant.

Placement	Contestant	International Placement
Mister India World 2026	Shevam Singh	TBA – Mister World 2026
Mister India Supranational 2026	Abel Biju	Top 20 – Mister Supranational 2026
Mister Rising Star	Shiv Chordia	
Top 6	Adhish Chaturvedi; Lakshay Chaudhary; Toa Rakap	

=== Special awards ===
The sub-contests for Mr. India 2025 began on August 19, 2025, in Mumbai during the first day of Bootcamp 1. The initial group of finalists from these sub-contests was revealed via the organization's official social media platforms.

Award Categories	Results	Contestants
Bennet University Mr IQ	Chayan Mukherjee	
Mr Perfect Body	Winner	Aditya Rawtani; Toa Rakap
Mr Perfect Body	Top 6	Abel Biju; Hriday Valvani; Navleen Singh; Viraj Singh
Mr Top Model	Winner	Adhish Chaturvedi
Mr Top Model	Top 5	Chayan Mukherjee; Nishant Kumar; Shevam Singh; Shiv Chordia

== Background ==
=== Format ===
As per the traditional format, online registrations for Mister India 2025 Season 2 opened in early June. A final audition round was conducted in Mumbai, where shortlisted contestants competed for a place among the Top 12 finalists. These finalists participated in multiple segments, including interviews, sports and fitness challenges, and social impact presentations. They competed for three titles: Mister India World, Mister India Supranational, and a newly introduced title for that season, Mister Rising Star.

Rohit Khandelwal, Mister World 2016, and Nehal Chudasama, Miss Universe India 2018, served as mentors for Mister India 2025 Season 2.

=== Selection committee ===
==== Final Audition ====
- Altamash Faraz – Mister Supranational Asia & Oceania 2017
- Dr Blossom Kochhar – Happiness Coach
- Gayatri Bhardwaj – Actress, Femina Miss India United Continents 2018
- Gokul Ganesan – Mister India World 2024
- Rohit Khandelwal – Mister World 2016
- Sachiin Khumbhaar – Celebrity Anchor and Speech Expert
- Shubham Sharma – Mister India Supranational 2025
- Sunny Kamble – Supermodel and Rampwalk Coach

==== Grand Finale ====
- Aditi Govitrikar – Actress and Mrs. World 2001 from India
- Jatin Kampani – Fashion photographer
- Ken Ghosh – Filmmaker
- Rocky Star – Fashion designer
- Sangeeta Bijlani – Former Bollywood actress, Femina Miss India Universe 1980
- Varoin Marwah – Fashion designer

== Contestants ==
Progressing from the initial Top 100 to the Top 22 and ultimately the Top 12, the following is the list of finalists competing in Mr India 2025 (Season 2):

Nu.	Contestant	Age (Note: Ages at the time of the pageant)	Hometown	Height
1	Abel Biju	24	Kottayam	1.85 m (6 ft 1 in)
2	Adhish Chaturvedi	21	Kota	1.85 m (6 ft 1 in)
3	Aditya Rawtani	23	Mumbai	1.80 m (5 ft 11 in)
4	Chayan Mukherjee	28	Kolkata	1.92 m (6 ft 3 1/2 in)
5	Hriday Valvani	25	Indore	1.85 m (6 ft 1 in)
6	Lakshay Chaudhary	27	New Delhi	1.83 m (6 ft 0 in)
7	Navleen Singh	33	Tarn Taran Sahib	1.85 m (6 ft 1 in)
8	Nishant Kumar	26	Lucknow	1.83 m (6 ft 0 in)
9	Shevam Singh	30	Patna	1.88 m (6 ft 2 in)
10	Shiv Chordia	18	Pune	1.80 m (5 ft 11 in)
11	Toa Rakap	25	Itanagar	1.73 m (5 ft 8 in)
12	Viraj Singh	21	Delhi	1.73 m (5 ft 8 in)
