= Miss and Mister Supranational India =

National beauty pageant competition in India

- Formation: 2011 / 2017
- Type: Beauty pageant
- Headquarters: Mumbai
- Location: India
- Members: Miss and Mister Supranational
- Official language: English; Hindi
- Brand & Operations Head: Natasha Grover
- Key people: Vineet Jain
- Website: Femina.in

Miss and Mister Supranational India is a national beauty pageant that selects India's representatives for the global Miss Supranational and Mister Supranational competitions, which take place annually in Poland.

== History ==
=== Miss Supranational India ===
Miss Supranational India

India first participated in the Miss Supranational pageant in 2011, with Michelle Almeida representing the country. She was selected by the Indian Princess organization and made it to the top 20, winning the Miss Supranational Asia and Oceania title in 2011. In 2013, the pageant's license was acquired by The Times Group, and Vijaya Sharma, chosen through Femina Miss India 2013, also placed in the top 20 at Miss Supranational 2013.

From 2014 onwards, India's representatives were selected through Miss Diva, a sister pageant of Femina Miss India. In the same year, Asha Bhat won the Miss Supranational 2014 crown, becoming India's first titleholder at the international event.

Between 2016 and 2023, the runner-up of Miss Diva held the title of Miss Diva Supranational. However, starting in 2024, the primary Miss Diva winner will now be awarded the Miss Diva Supranational title, marking a shift in the pageant's structure.

=== Mister Supranational India ===
Mister Supranational India

India began participating in the Mister Supranational pageant in 2016, with Jitesh Naresh Thakur representing the country through the Mister India competition. Thakur achieved a 2nd Runner-up finish and won the title of Mister Supranational Asia.

In 2023, the Mister Supranational India license was held by Himadri Bhatnagar's organization, which sent Raj Sunil Singh as their first delegate. However, Singh did not advance to the semi-finals, marking the end of India's placement streak in the competition.

In 2024, The Times Group regained the license to select India's future representatives, starting with the 2025 edition of Mister Supranational.

=== International Victories ===
India has won two Miss Supranational titles and one Mister Supranational title.

The first Miss Supranational victory came in 2014 when Asha Bhat won the title, making India the second Asian country to achieve this. In 2016, Srinidhi Shetty secured India's second Miss Supranational title, making India the only country with two wins till day.

In 2018, Prathamesh Maulingkar became the first Indian to win Mister Supranational. He remains the only Asian to have won the Mister Supranational title so far.

== Representatives at Miss Supranational ==
- : Declared as Winner
- : Ended as Runner-up
- : Ended as one of the Finalists
- : Ended as one of the Semi-finalists
- : Unplaced but given special awards

Year	Delegate	Age^{[α]}	Hometown	Competition performance	
Year	Delegate	Age^{[α]}	Hometown	Placements	Special award(s)
2011	Michelle Almeida	22	Maharashtra	Top 20	2 Special Awards: Miss Supranational – Asia and Oceania; Miss Internet
2012	Gunjan Saini	23	New Delhi	Unplaced	
2013	Vijaya Sharma	20	New Delhi	Top 20	
2014	Asha Bhat	22	Karnataka	Miss Supranational 2014	2 Special Awards: Miss Talented; Top 5 – Miss Internet
2015	Aafreen Rachael Vaz	24	Karnataka	Top 10	4 Special Awards: Miss Supranational - Asia and Oceania; 1st Runner Up – Miss Internet; Top 10 – Miss Supranational Top Model; Top 10 – Best National Costume
2016	Srinidhi Shetty	24	Karnataka	Miss Supranational 2016	2 Special Awards: Miss Supranational – Asia and Oceania; 3rd Runner-up – Miss Mobstar
2017	Peden Ongmu Namgyal	22	Sikkim	Top 25	2 Special Awards: 2nd Runner-up – Miss Talent; 3rd Runner-up – Best in Swimsuit
2018	Aditi Hundia	21	Rajasthan	Top 25	
2019	Shefali Sood	24	Uttar Pradesh	Top 25	1 Special Award: Top 10 – Miss Influencer
2021	Aavriti Choudhary	23	Madhya Pradesh	Top 12	
2022	Ritika Khatnani	20	Maharashtra	Top 12	5 Special Awards: Miss Supranational Asia; Miss Photogenic; Top 3 – Miss Talent; Top 10 – Supra Influencer; Top 11 – Top Model
2023	Pragnya Ayyagari	21	Telangana	Top 12	4 Special Awards: Miss Supranational Asia; Top 5 – Supra Chat; Top 7 – Miss Talent; Top 10 – Supra Fan-Vote
2024	Sonal Kukreja	26	Rajasthan	Top 12	1 Special Award: Top 13 – Miss Influencer
2025	Ayushree Malik	19	Delhi	Top 24	2 Special Awards: Winner – Supra Chat; Top 21 – Miss Influencer
2026	Avni Gupta	22	Uttar Pradesh	Top 12	

Note – Due to the impact of COVID-19 pandemic, no pageant held in 2020

== Representatives at Mister Supranational ==
- : Declared as Winner
- : Ended as Runner-up
- : Ended as one of the Finalists
- : Ended as one of the Semi-finalists
- : Unplaced but given special awards

Year	Delegate	Age^{[α]}	Hometown	Competition performance	
Year	Delegate	Age^{[α]}	Hometown	Placements	Special award(s)
2016	Jitesh Naresh Thakur	27	Rajasthan	2nd Runner-up	3 Special Awards: Mister Supranational Asia – Winner; Top Model – Winner; Mister Mobstar – 3rd Runner-up
2017	Altamash Faraz	26	New Delhi	Top 10	4 Special Awards: Mister Supranational Asia & Oceania – Winner; Best in Swimsuit – 1st Runner-up; Extreme Race – 1st Runner-up; Best in Streetwear – 3rd Runner-up
2018	Prathamesh Maulingkar	27	Goa	Mister Supranational 2018	2 Special Awards: Best Body – Winner; Mister Social Media – Winner
2019	Varun Verma	27	New Delhi	Top 10	3 Special Awards: Mister Supranational Asia – Winner; Mister Supra Fan Vote – Top 10; Digital Influencer – Top 10
2021	Rahul Rajasekharan	32	Kerala	Top 10	4 Special Awards: Mister Supranational Asia – Winner; Mister Supra Chat – Winner; Digital Influencer – Top 10; Mister Supra Fan Vote – Top 10
2023	Raj Singh	22	Maharashtra	Unplaced	1 Special Award: Winner – Mister Talent
2024	Aman Rajesh Singh	24	Karnataka	Unplaced	
2025	Shubham Sharma	24	Maharashtra	Top 20	2 Special Awards: Winner – Mister Influencer Opportunity; Top 10 – Supra Model of the Year
2026	Abel Biju	25	Kerala	Top 20	2 Special Awards: Winner – Mister YouTube Supra-Influencer; Top 10 – Mister Supra Influencer

Note – Due to the impact of COVID-19 pandemic no pageant held in 2020. No representative was sent in 2022

== See also ==
- List of Indian representatives at international male beauty pageants
