= Mr India 2024 =

Indian beauty pageant

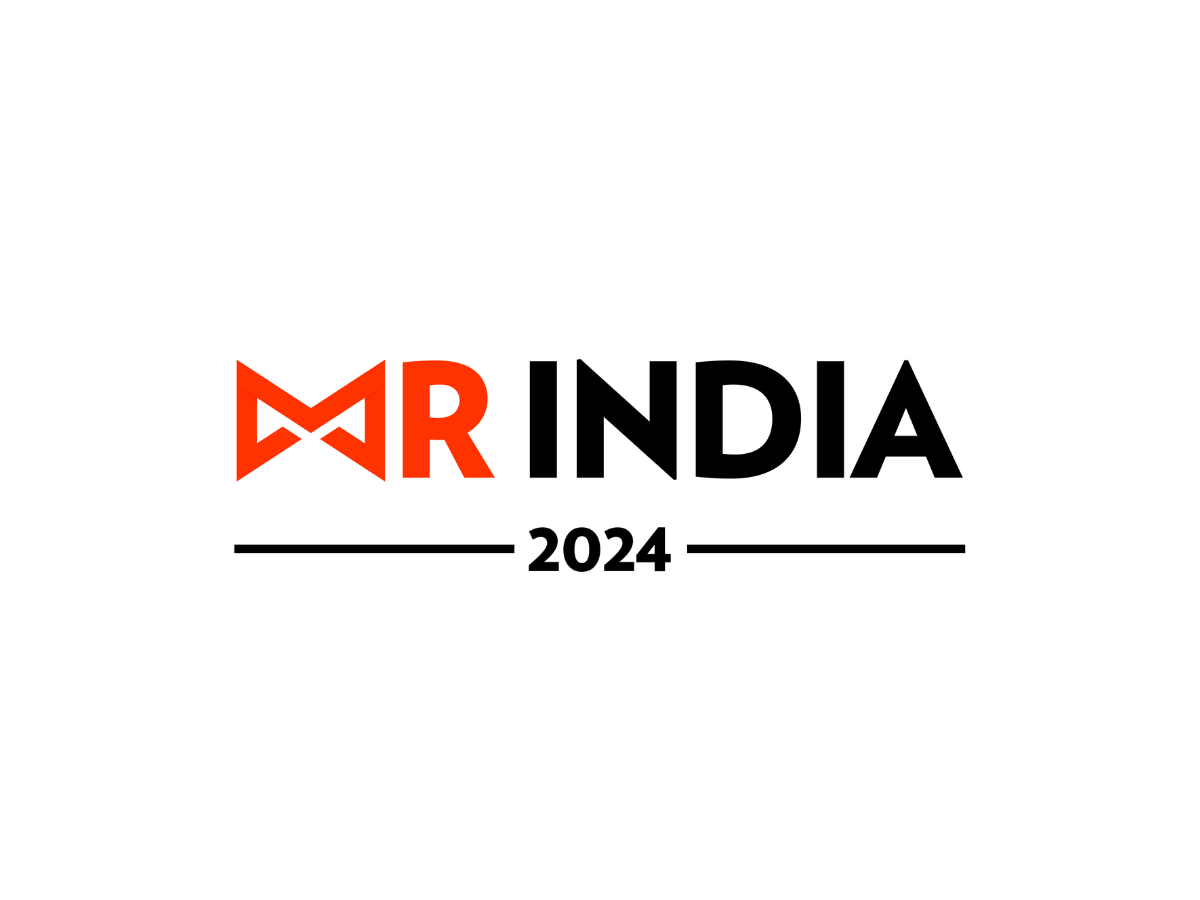
- Date: 20 July 2024
- Venue: Mumbai
- Entrants: 35
- Placements: 8
- Winner: Gokul Ganesan

Times Mister India 2024 was the 7th edition of Mister India under the Times Group, this edition marked the longest interval since the previous in-person event in 2017, excluding the digital edition of 2021. Notably, the 2021 edition was a virtual event held solely to select a representative for Mister Supranational 2021.

Gokul Ganesan was announced as the winner of the Mister India 2024 title on July 20, 2024, via the pageant's official social media account. He represented India at the Mister World 2024 competition, held on November 23, 2024, in Vietnam, and placed among the Top 10 finalists.

== Final Results ==
Color keys

- The contestant secured victory in an international pageant.
- The contestant finished as a runner-up in an international pageant.
- The contestant reached the semi-finals in an international pageant.

Placement	Contestant	International Placement
Mister India World 2024	Gokul Ganesan	Top 10 – Mister World 2024
Top 5	Dhanush Suresh; Ghanisht Dhall; Lucky Saran; Shaibaz Kokni	
Top 8	Eshaan Gautam; Saurabh Chaudhary; Vinay Manglani	

== Background ==
=== Selection of participants ===
The official announcement for the 2024 Mister India pageant was posted on the Mister India social media accounts on July 7, 2024. Promoted by Rohit Khandelwal, the winner of Mister World 2016, the application period closed on July 13, 2024. A shortlist of 35 contestants was revealed in groups on Mister India's social media platforms on July 16. The final round of auditions took place in Mumbai on July 17, where the top eight finalists were selected. The winner and runners-up of Times Mister India 2024 were announced on July 20, 2024.

Rahul Rajasekharan, Mister Supranational Asia 2021 and Mister India 2015 1st Runner-up, was announced as the mentor for the Mister India 2024 contestants on July 16, 2024, via Mister India's official social media handle.

All 35 shortlisted contestants arrived in Mumbai on July 17th for the final audition day. Navpreet Kaur, Femina Miss India Punjab 2017, hosted the event. The contestants participated in a multi-stage audition process evaluated by an eight-member judging panel. The top eight semi-finalists were then announced on July 18th via the Mister India social media handle.

=== Selection committee ===
- Nandini Gupta – Femina Miss India World 2023
- Natasha Grover – Brand & Operations Head, Femina Miss India Organisation
- Neeraj Gaba – Fashion & Lifestyle Director
- Rahul Rajasekharan – Mister Supranational Asia 2021 and Mr India 2015 1st Runner-up
- Rishu Bartaria – Head, Times Talent
- Rohit Khandelwal – Mister World 2016 from India
- Ruhi Singh – Miss Universal Peace and Humanity 2014 from India
- Suman Rao – Miss World Asia 2019

== Contestants ==
The following are the list of thirty-five contestants competing for the Mister India 2024 title:

Delegate	Hometown
Aasshman Kapoor	Jammu
Ali Shaquib	Patna
Athiban Krishna	Chennai
Avinash Sabarwal	Chandigarh
Chayan Mukherjee	Kolkata
Deepak Gurjar	Punhana
Dhanush Suresh	Bangalore
Dheeraj Bankar	Pune
Eshaan Gautam	Mumbai
Ghanisht Dhall	Delhi
Gokul Ganesan	Chennai
Hardik Panchal	Mumbai
Hritik Singh	Mumbai
Jitesh Nikam	Mumbai
Kiran More	Mumbai
Lucky Saran	Mumbai
Manish Chand	Lucknow
Meehir Kukreja	Sri Nagar
Pratham Ghatnur	Mumbai
Praveen Thanga	Chennai
Rahul Raju	Alappuzha
Rajsinh Thombare	Pune
Rence Nehal	Wayanad
Rishabh Jaiswal	Varanasi
Rissu Khan	Delhi
Roopam Goel	Delhi
Samir Arya	Mumbai
Saurabh Chaudhary	Mumbai
Shaibaz Kokni	Nasik
Shrey Devrukhar	Mumbai
Shubham Ravi	Mumbai
Sidhant Kashyap	Chandigarh
Sonish Hinduja	Delhi
Sumit Chandel	Mumbai
Vinay Manglani	Jaipur
