= Times Mister India =

National beauty pageant in India

Mister India
- Type: Men's beauty pageant
- Franchise holder: The Times Group
- Parent organization: Femina
- Headquarters: Mumbai, India
- Country represented: India
- Qualifies for: Mister World; Mister Supranational
- First edition: 2014 (May)
- Most recent edition: 2025 (August)
- Language: Hindi, English
- Predecessor: Grasim Mr. India

Times Mister India, aka Mister India World, is a beauty pageant and organization that selects India's official representative to the Mister World and the Mister Supranational pageants.

== History ==
The Times Group, the owner of the franchises for Femina Miss India and Miss Diva, launched Mister India in May 2014, holding its inaugural edition as "Mr India 2014" The pageant continued with consecutive editions until 2016. It then went on an extended temporary hiatus due to delays in the conduct of Mister World pageant, which resulted in no annual national competitions being held from 2018 to 2023.

The winner of the Times Mister India pageant primarily represents India at Mister World. Additionally, Mister India sent delegates to Mister Supranational from 2016 to 2021, with a separate digital edition held in 2021 to specifically select a representative for that year's Mister Supranational 2021 competition.

Marking its return in 2024, the Mister India pageant held its 6th edition on July 20th. This marked the longest hiatus between editions, with seven years having passed since the last competition held in 2017 formally on-stage. Also, the Mister India 2024 edition featured the highest number of shortlisted contestants (thirty-five) compared to any previous edition.

== International Victories ==
India has participated in the Mister World pageant since its inception. In 2014, the Times Group began sending representatives to the competition. Prateik Jain, India's inaugural participant (Times), achieved a Top 10 finish at the Mister World 2014 pageant and was also crowned Mister World Continental King of Asia.

In 2016, Rohit Khandelwal secured India's first and, to date, only Mister World title. This historic win also marked the first time an Asian contestant had claimed the coveted crown. That same year, Jitesh Naresh Thakur represented India at the inaugural Mister Supranational pageant, earning the position of second runner-up and the title of Mister Supranational Asia.

In 2018, Prathamesh Maulingkar became the first Indian and Asian winner of the Mister Supranational pageant. This achievement solidified India's position as the first country to have won both the Miss and Mister Supranational titles.

Rahul Rajasekharan was the last Indian representative to the Mister Supranational pageant selected by the Times Group, prior to the renewal of their partnership with the Mister Supranational organization in 2025. Since its inaugural edition until 2021, the Times Group has sent five representatives to the Mister Supranational pageant. All of their representatives have placed in the finals bagging 4 continental titles, with one winning the Mister Supranational title, one being the 2nd Runner-up and three in the Top 10.

=== Titles ===
Number of wins under Times Mister India
Pageant	Wins
Mister World	1
Mister Supranational	1

Note that the year designates the time Times Mister India has acquired that particular pageant franchise.

Current

- Mister World (2014–present)
- Mister Supranational (2016–2021, 2025–present)

== Editions ==
Below is the complete list of Times Mister India editions.

Year	Date	Mister India	Entrants	Pageant venue	Broadcaster
2014	May 8, 2014	Prateik Jain	14	D'Bell, Parel, Mumbai	Zoom TV
2015	July 11, 2015	Rohit Khandelwal	15	Club Royalty, Mumbai	Zoom TV
2016	December 11, 2016	Vishnu Raj Menon	16	Club Royalty, Mumbai	Zoom TV
2017	December 14, 2017	Jitesh Singh Deo	16	Castella de Aguada, Mumbai	Zoom TV
2019	September 26, 2019	Varun Verma	None	Rocky Star Cocktail Bar, Mumbai	Official Social Media Handle
2021	June 8, 2021	Rahul Rajasekharan	12	Virtual pageant	Official Social Media Handle
2024	July 20, 2024	Gokul Ganesan	35	Mumbai	Official Social Media Handle
2025	February 28, 2025	Shubham Sharma	80	Mumbai	Official Social Media Handle
2025	August 21, 2025	Shevam Singh	12	One8 Commune, Juhu, Mumbai	Zoom TV

=== Titleholders ===
Edition	Date	Mister India	Mister India Supranational	Current titles		
Edition	Date	Mister India	Mister India Supranational	Mister India World	1st Runner-up	2nd Runner-up
1	May 2014	Prateik Jain	Not awarded	Prateik Jain	Puneet Beniwal	Bharat Raj
2	July 2015	Rohit Khandelwal	Jitesh Thakur	Rohit Khandelwal	Rahul Rajasekharan	Prateek Gujral
3	December 2016	Vishnu Raj Menon	Altamash Faraz	Vishnu Raj Menon	Varun Verma	Devesh Khanduja
4	December 2017	Jitesh Singh Deo	Prathamesh Maulingkar	Jitesh Singh Deo	Abhi Khajuria	Pavan Rao
5	September 2019	Varun Verma		No pageant held instead appointed by Miss India Organization.		
6	June 2021	Rahul Rajasekharan		A virtual competition was held solely to select the representative for Mister Supranational 2021.		
7	July 2024	Gokul Ganesan	Not awarded	Gokul Ganesan	Not awarded	
8	February 2025	Shubham Sharma		Gokul Ganesan	Not awarded	
9	August 2025	Shevam Singh	Abel Biju	Shevam Singh	Shiv Chordia	Not awarded

== Placements in international pageants ==
The following is the placement of Times Mister India titleholders in international pageants.

- : Declared as Winner
- : Ended as runner-up or top 5/6 qualification
- : Ended as one of the finalist/Semi-finalists
- : Unplaced but given special award(s)

Mister World

Year	Delegate	Age^{[α]}	Hometown	Competition performance	
Year	Delegate	Age^{[α]}	Hometown	Placements	Special award(s)
2014	Prateik Jain	25	Bangalore	Top 10	6 Special Awards: Continental King of Asia and Oceania; Shot-Put – Winner; The Tug-O-War – Team Winner; Mister Multimedia – 1st Runner up; Talent Round – Top 21; Extreme sports – Top 24
2016	Rohit Khandelwal	27	Hyderabad	Mister World 2016	1 Special Award: Mister Multimedia - Winner
2019	Vishnu Raj Menon	28	Thrissur	Unplaced	1 Special Award: Mister Multimedia - 2nd Runner-up
2024	Gokul Ganesan	24	Chennai	Top 10	5 Special Awards: Top 5 – Multimedia Challenge; Top 5 – Top Model; Top 20 – Head-to-Head Challenge; Top 30 – Beauty With a Purpose; Top 36 – Talent Round
2025	Shevam Singh	30	Patna	TBA	

Mister Supranational

Year	Delegate	Age^{[α]}	Hometown	Competition performance	
Year	Delegate	Age^{[α]}	Hometown	Placements	Special award(s)
2016	Jitesh Naresh Thakur	27	Jaipur	2nd Runner-up	3 Special Awards: Mister Supranational Asia – Winner; Top Model – Winner; Mister Mobstar – 3rd Runner-up
2017	Altamash Faraz	26	New Delhi	Top 10	4 Special Awards: Mister Supranational Asia & Oceania – Winner; Best in Swimsuit – 1st Runner-up; Extreme Race – 1st Runner-up; Best in Streetwear – 3rd Runner-up
2018	Prathamesh Maulingkar	27	Tivim	Mister Supranational 2018	2 Special Awards: Best Body – Winner; Mister Social Media – Winner
2019	Varun Verma	27	New Delhi	Top 10	3 Special Awards: Mister Supranational Asia – Winner; Mister Supra Fan Vote – Top 10; Digital Influencer – Top 10
2021	Rahul Rajasekharan	32	Thrissur	Top 10	4 Special Awards: Mister Supranational Asia – Winner; Mister Supra Chat – Winner; Digital Influencer – Top 10; Mister Supra Fan Vote – Top 10
2025	Shubham Sharma	24	Mumbai	Top 20	1 Special Award: Mister Supra Influencer – Winner; Supra Model of the Year – Top 10
2026	Abel Biju	24	Kottayam	Top 20	2 Special Awards: Winner – Mister YouTube Supra-Influencer; Top 10 – Mister Supra Influencer

Note:
- ^α Age at the time of the international pageant

== See also ==
- List of Indian representatives at international male beauty pageants
- Femina Miss India
- List of beauty pageants
