= Mister Brazil CNB 2026 =

- Date: February 27, 2026
- Presenters: Eduarda Braum and Gabi Torbis
- Venue: WA Convention (Caruaru Mall), Caruaru, Brazil
- Broadcaster: Livestream (YouTube)
- Entrants: 23

Mister Brazil CNB 2026 was the 22nd edition of the traditional Mister Brazil male beauty pageant, which selects Brazilian representatives for prestigious international titles such as Mister International, Mister Global, Mister Supranational, among others. It was also the 18th edition under the management of CNB (Concurso Nacional de Beleza). Lucas Laet, Mister Brazil CNB 2025, crowned his successor at the end of the event, held in Caruaru and Recife, known as the capital of frevo. The contestants also visited Olinda. The contestant of Greater Curitiba Eduardo Castillo won the title at the end of the ceremony.

== Results ==
Color keys

- The contestant won the international pageant.
- The contestant was a finalist/runner-up in an international pageant.
- The contestant was a semi-Finalist in an international pageant.
- The contestant did not place.

=== Placements ===
Position	Representation & Contestant	International Placement
Mister Brazil CNB 2026	(Paraná (state)) Greater Curitiba - Eduardo Castillo	Unplaced at Mister International 2026.
2^{nd} Place	(São Paulo (state)) Southwest of São Paulo - Danton Miguel	Top 10 at Mister Supranational 2026.
3^{rd} Place	Pernambuco - Yago Ramon	Top 11 at Mister Global 2026.
Top 06	Maranhão - Paulo Vinícius	Top 20 at Mister Model International 2026.
Top 06	Paraíba - Igor Emanoel	1st runner-up at Mister Model International 2026.
Top 06	Rio Grande do Sul - Ezekiel Dall'Bello	
Top 10	Bahia - Felipe Silveira; Ceará - Edmundo Neto; (Rio Grande do Sul) Region of Missões - Felipe Primaz; (São Paulo (state)) São Paulo - Marcelo Montagner	
Top 16	(Amazonas (Brazilian state)) Amazonas - Rener Gomes; Espírito Santo - Pedro Totola; Mato Grosso do Sul - Matias Cenci; Minas Gerais - Tom Santana; Pará - Eduardo Vilhena; Paraná - Marcos Anacleto	

=== Special Prizes ===
Award	Representation & Contestant
Mister Friendship	Espírito Santo - Pedro Totola
Best in Swimwear by DNA	Rio Grande do Sul - Ezekiel Dall'Bello

=== Announcements order ===
==== Top 16 ====
1. Maranhão
2. Southwest of São Paulo
3. Pernambuco
4. Espírito Santo
5. Paraíba
6. Pará
7. Region of Missões
8. São Paulo
9. Ceará
10. Paraná
11. Rio Grande do Sul
12. Minas Gerais
13. Amazonas
14. Mato Grosso do Sul
15. Greater Curitiba
16. Bahia

==== Top 10 ====
1. Paraíba
2. São Paulo
3. Region of Missões
4. Rio Grande do Sul
5. Bahia
6. Ceará
7. Greater Curitiba
8. Maranhão
9. Southwest of São Paulo
10. Pernambuco

==== Top 06 ====
1. Maranhão
2. Pernambuco
3. Southwest of São Paulo
4. Rio Grande do Sul
5. Paraíba
6. Greater Curitiba

== Final Answer ==
The winner's answer about how we would use the national title to impact others, was:

I come from the state of Amazonas, and I am living proof that knowledge — or the lack of it — in the lives of young people is very scarce. I would use the visibility and influence of being Mister to help these people understand that, regardless of where they come from, they are capable of believing in themselves. That nothing should limit their power to dream. And with great pride, I would also like to invite you who are watching to be an example of transformation in these people's lives. Transform lives.

== Judges ==
=== Final ===
1. Jéssica Morais, businesswoman.
2. Jéssica Bruxelas, Miss Wellness World 2025;
3. Dr. Juliano Crema, CEO of Miss & Mister Brazil CNB;
4. Werner Wessels, from Miss and Mister Supranational organization;
5. João Ricardo Dias, director at Miss & Mister Brazil CNB;
6. Miro Sampaio, director at Miss & Mister Brazil CNB;
7. Adriana Fontana, M'Lev beachwear director;
8. Giovanna Starling, Miss Brasil Global 2026;
9. Dr. Diogo Dias, dermatologist;

== Fast Track Events ==
=== Mister Popular Vote ===
The winner classified in the Top 06:

Position	Representation & Contestant
1st place, gold medalist(s)	Maranhão - Paulo Vinícius
2nd place, silver medalist(s)	Agreste of Pernambuco - Daniel Carvalho
3rd place, bronze medalist(s)	Paraná - Marcos Anacleto
Top 10	Sergipe - Gullit Araújo; Pará - Eduardo Vilhena; Espírito Santo - Pedro Totola; (São Paulo (state)) Southwest of São Paulo - Danton Miguel; Mato Grosso do Sul - Matias Cenci; Ceará - Edmundo Neto; (Paraná (state)) Greater Curitiba - Eduardo Castillo

=== Mister Beauty with a Purpose ===
The winner classified in the Top 16:

Position	Representation & Contestant
1st place, gold medalist(s)	Maranhão - Paulo Vinícius
Top 05	(Acre (state)) Acre - Jefferson Silva; Espírito Santo - Pedro Totola; Paraná - Marcos Anacleto; Rio Grande do Sul - Ezekiel Dall'Bello
Classified	Agreste of Pernambuco - Daniel Carvalho; (Amazonas (Brazilian state)) Amazonas - Rener Gomes; (Federal District (Brazil)) Brasília - David Ambrósio; Ceará - Edmundo Neto; (Santa Catarina (state)) European Valley - Felipe Tomé; (Paraná (state)) Greater Curitiba - Eduardo Castillo; Mato Grosso do Sul - Matias Cenci; Sergipe - Gullit Araújo; (São Paulo (state)) Southwest of São Paulo - Danton Miguel

== Contestants ==
Confirmed contestants in this year's pageant, 23 in total:

Representation	Contestant	Age	Hometown	Occupation	Ref.
(Acre (state)) Acre	Jefferson da Silva Souza	33	Rio Branco, AC	Physical Education student	
Agreste of Pernambuco	Daniel de Melo Carvalho	36	Bezerros, PE	Doctor	
(Amazonas (Brazilian state)) Amazonas	Rener Gomes da Costa	28	Manaus, AM	Lawyer	
Bahia	Felipe Santana Silveira	29	Vitória da Conquista, BA	Lawyer	
(Federal District (Brazil)) Brasília	David Eduardo Ambrósio	25	Fercal, DF	Fitness instructor	
Ceará	Edmundo Barbosa da Silva Neto	36	Fortaleza, CE	Civil servant	
Espírito Santo	Pedro Henrique Balista Totola	28	Santa Teresa, ES	Dentist	
(Santa Catarina (state)) European Valley	Márcio Felipe Fernandes Tomé	32	São João do Oriente, MG	Model and Coach	
(Pará) Greater Belém	Daniel Silveira Freire	39	Belém, PA	Businessman	
(Paraná (state)) Greater Curitiba	Eduardo Gamberty dos Santos Castillo	28	Manaus, AM	Model and Lawyer	
Maranhão	Paulo Vinícius Silva Santos	36	Porto Franco, MA	Doctor	
Mato Grosso do Sul	Edrieno Fábio Matias dos Santos Cenci	38	Dourados, MS	HR Manager	
Minas Gerais	Alexsandro "Tom" Rodrigues Santana	34	Belo Horizonte, MG	Fitness instructor	
Pará	Eduardo da Silva Vilhena	33	Alenquer, PA	Pharmaceutical	
Paraíba	Igor Emanoel Oliveira	26	João Pessoa, PB	Model and Digital Influencer	
Paraná	Marcos Anacleto do Nascimento	31	Cascavel, PR	Model and Businessman	
Pernambuco	Yago Ramon Araújo Cavalcante	30	Caruaru, PE	Lawyer	
(Rio Grande do Sul) Region of Missões	Felipe Daninheimer Primaz	28	São Luiz Gonzaga, RS	Personal trainer	
Rio Grande do Norte	Victor Augusto Souza Grossi	31	Natal, RN	Software developer	
Rio Grande do Sul	Ezekiel Dall'Bello dos Santos	32	Santa Maria, RS	Businessman	
(São Paulo (state)) São Paulo	Marcelo Montagner Marassa	35	Campinas, SP	Private banker	
(São Paulo (state)) Southwest of São Paulo	Danton Murilo Miguel	35	Piraju, SP	Payroll Specialist	
Sergipe	Gullit Diego Araújo de Melo	31	Aracaju, SE	Physical Education student	

== Trivia ==
=== Replacement ===
- Bahia Enzzo Biondo ➡️ Felipe Silveira

=== Disqualified ===
- ⬇️ Mato Grosso - Willon da Costa Soares
- ⬇️ Santa Catarina - Rique Jones de Cândido Daros

=== Withdrawals ===
- ⬇️ Alagoas
- ⬇️ Goiás
- ⬇️ (Santa Catarina (state)) Greater Florianópolis
- ⬇️ (São Paulo (state)) Ipiranga Region
- ⬇️ (São Paulo (state)) Northwest Paulista
- ⬇️ (Paraná (state)) Parque das Águas de Pinhais
- ⬇️ (Federal District (Brazil)) Plano Piloto
- ⬇️ (Rio de Janeiro (state)) Rio de Janeiro
- ⬇️ (São Paulo (state)) São Paulo Capital
- ⬇️ (Santa Catarina (state)) Serra Catarinense
- ⬇️ (Rio de Janeiro (state)) South Fluminense Region
- ⬇️ Tocantins

=== Returnings ===
- Last competed in 2024 contest:
  - ⬆️ Paraíba
- Last competed in 2023 contest:
  - ⬆️ (Paraná (state)) Greater Curitiba
- Last competed in 2022 contest:
  - ⬆️ Espírito Santo
  - ⬆️ (Rio Grande do Sul) Region of Missões
- Last competed in 2019 contest:
  - ⬆️ (Pará) Greater Belém
  - ⬆️ (Santa Catarina (state)) European Valley

=== Debuts ===
- ⬆️ (São Paulo (state)) Southwest of São Paulo

== Crossovers ==
Contestants in other beauty pageants:

=== National ===
Mister Brazil

- 2022: Bahia - Felipe Silveira
  - (Representing Bahia in Balneário Camboriú, Santa Catarina)
- 2025: Bahia - Felipe Silveira (Top 06)
  - (Representing Bahia in Balneário Camboriú, Santa Catarina)

Mister Eco Brazil

- 2023: (Amazonas (Brazilian state)) Amazonas - Rener Gomes (Winner)
  - (Representing Amazonas in Brasília, Distrito Federal)

=== International ===
Mister Afro International

- 2021: (Santa Catarina (state)) Vale Europeu - Felipe Tomé (Winner)
  - (Representing Brazil in Buenaventura, Colombia)

Mister Model Mediterraneo

- 2023: (Amazonas (Brazilian state)) Amazonas - Rener Gomes (Mister Photogenic)
  - (Representing Brazil in Elche, Spain)
