= Prateik Jain =

Indian model

Prateek Jain
- Born: Prateik Jain; 14 June 1989 (age 37); Bangalore, Karnataka, India
- Education: Christ University
- Occupation: Model
- Height: 1.93 m (6 ft 4 in)
- Beauty pageant titleholder
- Title: Asian Supermodel 2015; Asian Supermodel India 2015; Provogue MensXP Mr India World 2014
- Years active: 2014–present
- Major competitions: Asian Supermodel Contest 2015 (Winner); Mister World 2014 (Top 10) (Continental King of Asia and Oceania); Provogue MensXP Mr India World 2014 (Winner) (Mr. Iron man)

Prateek Jain (born 14 June 1989) is an Indian model, actor and the winner of Provogue MensXP Mister World India 2014. He represented India at Mister World 2014 and was among Top 10 Finalists. In 2015, he won Asian Supermodel Contest held in China. He is the first Indian man to win the Asian Supermodel Contest.

== Career ==
He is an Indian Model and the winner of Mister India World 2014 . Earlier he was an investment banker.

He was announced the winner of the first edition of Provouge MensXP Mr World India 2014.He was also named MensXP Mr Iron Man.

He represented India at Mister World 2014 pageant held in Torbay, Britain on 15 June 2014 and was among the Top 10 finalists. He also won sub-awards there including Shot put, 1st runner up in multimedia, The Tug-O-War team winner and was placed in top 24 in extreme sports. He is placed 18th in Times Most Desirable Men 2014 polls by Times of India.

Prateek Jain is set to debut in Hindi movie Karmaanya.

== See also ==
- Mr India World
- Sushant Divgikar
- Sachin Khurana
- Puneet Beniwal

Awards and achievements
Preceded by (India) Taher Ali	Mister India World; 2014	Succeeded by (India) Rohit Khandelwal
