= Bem Paraná =

Brazilian daily newspaper

- Type: Daily newspaper
- Format: Tabloid, online newspaper
- Founder: Roberto Barrozo
- President: Roberto Barrozo Filho
- Founded: 17 June 1983; 43 years ago
- Language: Portuguese
- City: Curitiba
- Country: Brazil
- Website: www.bemparana.com.br

Bem Paraná is a Brazilian newspaper founded in Curitiba on 17 June 1983, under the name Jornal do Estado. Its name was changed in 2013 due to the success of its eponymous website.

== History ==
The newspaper Jornal do Estado was founded by Roberto Barrozo on 17 June 1983, circulating in Greater Curitiba. The initial name caused controversy, as there were several newspapers with similar names, such as O Estado do Paraná, and the name did not specify the state in which the newspaper circulated. The name change was denied due to the conservatism of the management. In 1996, the newspaper had its first color edition. Its daily circulation was between 9,000 and 10,000 copies.

In 1999, Roberto Barrozo Filho assumed the presidency of the newspaper after his father's death. During his tenure, Jornal do Estado launched its website in 2003, becoming a news portal in 2006. In 2008, the portal was renamed Bem Paraná. Due to its success, in 2013 the print newspaper was also renamed Bem Paraná. The name Jornal do Estado was used as the company's motto until 2017. In that same year, the portal received between 1 million and 1.2 million hits per month. During this period, the newspaper underwent a reduction in physical space and staff. In 2015, the change from the traditional format to a tabloid was completed. A new cultural programming section, the Bem Feito supplement, the weekly insert Bem na Segunda, and the police blog Plantão 190 were also created. The change was driven by the closure of the Gazeta do Povo daily newspaper, which opened up a space in the market. In 2015, there were over 40 blogs on the portal, including Curitiba Mil Grau and Curitiba Cult. In 2023, the newspaper began investing in audiovisual content, producing videos and podcasts.
