= Mr India 2015 =

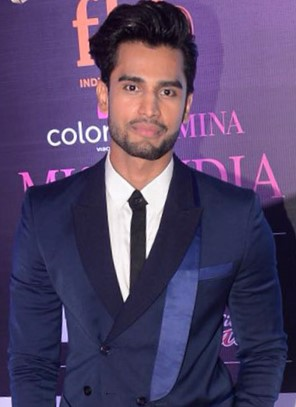
- Provogue Personal Care Mr India 2015
- Date: July 23, 2015
- Entertainment: Manasi Scott
- Venue: Club Royalty, Mumbai, Maharashtra; India
- Broadcaster: Zoom
- Entrants: 15
- Placements: 6
- Winner: Rohit Khandelwal; Telangana
- Congeniality: Ulhas Dhiman; Punjab
- Photogenic: Jitesh Thakur; Rajasthan

Provogue Personal Care Mr India 2015 was a contest held in Mumbai on July 23, 2015. Fifteen contestants from all over the country were shortlisted to compete in the main event held in Mumbai. Previous year's winner, Mr India 2014 and Mister World 2014 finalist, Prateik Jain passed on his title to Rohit Khandelwal of Hyderabad, Telangana. Rahul Rajasekharan from Kerala was declared the 1st Runner-up and Prateek Gujral from Maharashtra was declared the 2nd Runner-up at the grand finale held in Club Royalty, Mumbai.

Rohit Khandelwal had represented India at the Mister World contest and went on to win the title of Mister World 2016 creating history to become the first Asian ever to win the title.

Jitesh Thakur represented India at the first inception of Mr Supranational. Wherein he won the 2nd runner up position. He also bagged the sub title Top Model at the said Pageant.

== Results ==
Color keys

- The contestant Won in an International pageant.
- The contestant was a Runner-up in an International pageant.
- The contestant was a Semi-finalist in an International pageant.

Placement	Contestant	International Placement
Mister India World 2015	Rohit Khandelwal	Winner – Mister World 2016
Mister India Supranational 2016	Jitesh Thakur	2nd Runner-up – Mister Supranational 2016
1st Runner-up	Rahul Rajasekharan Nair	Top 10 – Mister Supranational 2021
2nd Runner-up	Prateek Gujral	
Top 6	Ankit Arora; Rupinderjit Singh; Akshay Jain	

=== Special awards ===
Award	Contestant
Times Mr Photogenic	Jitesh Thakur
Times Mr Talented	Neeraj Sharma; Ulhas Dhiman
Times Top Model	Sagar Gera
Dr. A's Clinic Mr Healthy Hair	Sagar Gera
Times Mr Congeniality	Ulhas Dhiman
Zoiro Mr Perfect Body	Ulhas Dhiman
Gio Collection Mr Trendsetter	Sagar gera
Wahl Mr Metrosexual	Suraj Chhajed
SRM University Mr Sudoku	Rajju Khadela (Surti Hiro)
Stay-On Mr Active	Rohit Khandelwal
Provogue Personal Care Best Actor	Rahul Rajasekharan; Rohit Khandelwal
Prosport Mr Ironman	Rahul Rajasekharan

== Contestants ==
- 15 contestants from all over India were shortlisted to compete in the main event in Mumbai.

Contestant No.	Name	State	Profession
01	Akshay Jain	Maharashtra	Engineer
02	Ankit Arora	New Delhi	Hotelier
03	Jitesh Thakur	Rajasthan	Marketing Manager, model
04	Manish Mudgil	New Delhi	Server Engineer, model
05	Neeraj Sharma	Haryana	Model
06	Prateek Gujral	Maharashtra	Software engineer, model
07	Rahul Rajasekharan	Kerala	Entrepreneur, model
08	Rajatdeep Singh	New Delhi	Student
09	Rishab Bajaj	Punjab	Model
10	Rohit Khandelwal	Telangana	Actor, model
11	Rupinderjit Singh	Maharashtra	Actor, model, engineer
12	Sagar Gera	Haryana	Model
13	Shishir Singh	Maharashtra	Actor
14	Suraj Chhajed	Maharashtra	Model
15	Ulhas Dhiman	Punjab	Actor, model
