= Bharat Kundra =

Indian actor

Bharat Kumar Kundra
- Born: New Delhi, India
- Citizenship: Indian
- Education: B.Tech Information technology
- Occupations: Model, actor
- Years active: 2007–2014
- Awards: Mr India 2007, Mr Photogenic, University Award (G.G.S.I.P University, New Delhi)

Bharat Kumar Kundra is an Indian model, actor, and anchor. He is a winner of title Mr. India 2007.

== Career ==
=== Modelling ===
Kundra after winning the title of Mr. India, worked with national and international brands.

== Awards ==
On 31 March 2007, Kundra was named as the winner of the title of Mr. India he also won the title of Mr. Photogenic at the Mr. India.
