= Mr India 2025 =

Indian beauty pageant

- Date: 28 February 2025
- Venue: Mumbai
- Entrants: 80
- Placements: 30
- Winner: Shubham Sharma

The Times Mister India 2025 was the 8th edition of the Mister India competition organized by the Times Group. The grand finale took place on 21 February 2025, in Mumbai, while the winner was officially revealed on 28 February 2024, through a six-part episode series broadcast on organization's social media platforms.

At the end of the event, Shubham Sharma was crowned Mister Supranational India 2025. He was sashed by Prathamesh Maulingkar, Mister Supranational 2018. Shubham represented India at the Mister Supranational 2025 competition, held on 28 July 2025, in Poland and placed among the Top 20 semi-finalists.

== Final Results ==
Color keys

- The contestant secured victory in an international pageant.
- The contestant finished as a runner-up in an international pageant.
- The contestant reached the semi-finals in an international pageant.

Placement	Contestant	International Placement
Mister India Supranational 2025	Shubham Sharma	Top 20 – Mister Supranational 2025
Top 5	Lucky Saran; Navee Rautela; Renny Td; Rohan Goradia	
Top 12	Aarnav Pande; Aryan Singh; Pratham Ghatnur; Shadab Kagadi; Sujit Muktan; Yash Baweja; Yash Dipak Dalvi	
Top 30	Amal Rajesh; Aminder Cogi; Animesh Tripathi; Dhruv Vijay Gagwani; Eshan Gautam; Kamlesh Solanki; Kuldeep Chouhan; Manan Singh Chhabra; Praveen Thanga; Rajeev Pawar; Ruchit Kamble; Satvik Shah; Shivam Raj; Somprabh Thakur; Tanuj Choudhary; Vibhash Kaushik; Vishal Gope; Vishal Manoj Parcha	

== Background ==
=== Selection of participants ===
Registration for the competition opened on 10 December 2024 and closed on 15 February 2025. On 18 February 2025, the organization announced the Top 80 contestants through social media. The final audition took place on 21 February 2025, where contestants participated in onstage interviews, resulting in the selection of the Top 30. The grand finale was also held on the same day. However, the titleholder was announced on 28 February 2025 through an episode released on the official YouTube channel. The episode covered the final audition day, hosted by Nehal Chudasama, Miss Diva Universe 2018.

On 25 February 2025, the organization unveiled the Top 30 finalists through its official social media channels.

=== Selection committee ===
- Jitesh Thakur – Mister Supranational 2016 2nd Runner-Up from India
- Nandini Gupta – Femina Miss India World 2023
- Nikita Porwal – Femina Miss India World 2024
- Prathamesh Maulingkar – Mister Supranational 2018 from India
- Ritika Khatnani – Miss Supranational Asia 2022 from India
- Rohit Khandelwal – Mister World 2016 from India

== Contestants ==
=== Top 80 ===
The following are the Top 80 contestants initially shortlisted for the competition:

- Aarnav Pande – Haryana
- Abhinav Thakur – Himachal Pradesh
- Abhishek Mishra – Tamil Nadu
- Aditya Khurana – Maharashtra
- Alfaiz Jagirdar – Madhya Pradesh
- Amal Rajesh – Kerala
- Aminder Cogi – Delhi
- Amogh Shivanand Shettar – Maharashtra
- Animesh Tripathi - Madhya Pradesh
- Aryan Singh – Uttar Pradesh
- Asad Shaikh – Uttar Pradesh
- Asif Bhat – Jammu and Kashmir
- Asif Khan – Jammu and Kashmir
- Athul Suresh – Kerala
- Ayussh Dadhich – Maharashtra
- Bhagyesh Tiwari – Maharashtra
- Darpan Sandip – Maharashtra
- Dhruv Vijay Gagwani – Maharashtra
- Divanshu Dixit – Rajasthan
- Eshan Gautam – Maharashtra
- Gagandeep Singh Banga – Chandigarh
- Jagjot Singh – Chandigarh
- Kalash Chandra – Uttar Pradesh
- Kamlesh Solanki – Tamil Nadu
- Karan Singh V – Rajasthan
- Krishna Adipudi – Telangana
- Kuldeep Chouhan – Rajasthan
- Kunal Dashora – Rajasthan
- Kunal Raghava – Rajasthan
- Lakshay Chaudhary – Maharashtra
- Lucky Saran – Rajasthan
- Manan Singh Chhabra – Madhya Pradesh
- Muhammed Naizal – Kerala
- Navee Rautela – Maharashtra
- Neeraj Sen – Tamil Nadu
- Nitin Yadav – Haryana
- Parkash Verma – Chandigarh
- Pranav Kumar – Maharashtra
- Pranav Pandey – Maharashtra
- Pratham Ghatnur – Maharashtra
- Praveen Thanga – Tamil Nadu
- Priyanshu Kumar Tiwari – Jharkhand
- Rahul Choudhary – Rajasthan
- Rajeev Pawar – Maharashtra
- Raghav Anand – Tamil Nadu
- Rasik Arun Ziite – Maharashtra
- Ravi Krishna Sankrit – Bihar
- Renny Td – Tamil Nadu
- Rhythm Garg – Uttar Pradesh
- Rohit Shankar Chhattani – Maharashtra
- Rohan Goradia – Maharashtra
- Ruchit Kamble – Maharashtra
- Rupendra Swarnkar – Chhattisgarh
- Sangam Patra – Odisha
- Sanjeev Panghal – Haryana
- Sapt Jeet Das – Maharashtra
- Satvik Shah – Gujarat
- Shadab Kagadi – Maharashtra
- Shivam Raj – Maharashtra
- Shubham Chandresh Sharma – Maharashtra
- Shubham Choudhary – Maharashtra
- Shubhneet Singh – Punjab
- Siiddhantsinh Jadeja – Gujarat
- Somprabh Thakur – Maharashtra
- Saurav Patwal – Haryana
- Sujit Muktan – Karnataka
- Sujith Koripa – Telangana
- Sunil Behl – Maharashtra
- Swapnil Suryakant Inarkar – Maharashtra
- Tanuj Choudhary – Haryana
- Vibhash Kaushik – Madhya Pradesh
- Vishal Gope – West Bengal
- Vishal Manoj Parcha – Maharashtra
- Vishal Takkekar – Karnataka
- Wahid Bhat – Maharashtra
- Yadnesh Pawar – Maharashtra
- Yash Baweja – Punjab
- Yash Dipak Dalvi – Maharashtra
