= Mister Supranational 2026 =

10th Mister Supranational pageant, beauty pageant edition

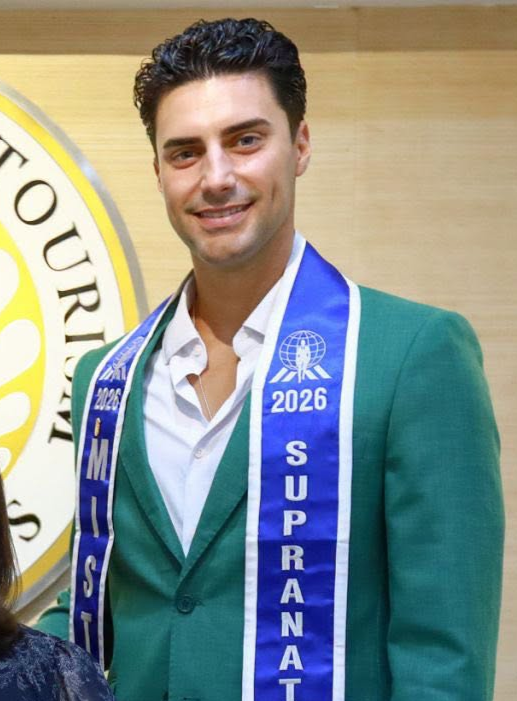
- Pedro Cordero
- Date: August 1, 2026
- Presenters: Fezile Mkhize; Ida Nowakowska; Justýna Zedníková; Kasandra Zawal
- Entertainment: FiśBanda; Mateusz Ziółko; Oktavvia; Tatiana Okupnik
- Venue: Strzelecki Park Amphitheater, Nowy Sącz, Poland
- Broadcaster: Polsat / Livestream (YouTube)
- Entrants: 41
- Placements: 20
- Debuts: Turkey; United States Virgin Islands; Zambia
- Withdrawals: Cameroon; Hong Kong; Macau; Namibia; Trinidad and Tobago
- Returns: Chile; Cuba; Ireland; Romania; Sweden
- Winner: Pedro Cordero; Spain
- Congeniality: Danton Miguel, Brazil
- Photogenic: Christopher Chidubem, Nigeria

Mister Supranational 2026 was the 10th edition of the Mister Supranational pageant, held on 1 August 2026 at the Strzelecki Park Amphitheater in Nowy Sącz, Poland.

Swann Lavigne of France crowned Pedro Cordero of Spain as his successor at the end of the event, marking the country's second victory in the pageant's history.

== Background ==
=== Location and date ===
The 10th edition of Mister Supranational will be held at the Strzelecki Park Amphitheater in Nowy Sącz, with the final night scheduled for August 1, 2026.

=== Selection of contestants ===
Contestants from 41 countries and territories were selected to compete for the 2026 edition, making this edition the largest turnout in the pageant's history, surpassing 2019 with 40.

==== Replacements ====
Zaw Sam Naw was the winner of Mister Supranational Myanmar and initially chosen to represent the country, but later relinquished his title due to personal reasons. The organisation then appointed Thiha Htun as the new titleholder.

Guillermo Lago was initially chosen to represent Spain, but later resigned due to health reasons. He was replaced by Pedro Cordero, who subsequently won the title of Mister Supranational 2026.

==== Debuts, returns, and withdrawals ====
This edition marked the debuts of Turkey, United States Virgin Islands, and Zambia; and also featured the returns of Chile, Cuba, Romania, and Sweden.

Cuba last competed in 2023; Romania last competed in 2021; Chile last competed in 2019; while Sweden last competed in 2016.

Karol Toth of Slovakia withdrew his title for unknown reasons.

Daniel Mbella of Cameroon withdrew from the competition due to administrative and travel issues. He previously joined the Supra Chat Challenge 2026.

Additionally, Geraldo Menéndez of Equatorial Guinea and Demitha Jayawardena of Sri Lanka, who were expected to participate, were no-shows in Poland; both also previously took part in the Supra Chat Challenge 2026.

== Results ==
=== Placements ===
Placement	Contestant
Mister Supranational 2026	Spain – Pedro Cordero
1st Runner-Up	South Africa – Marcél Roux
2nd Runner-Up	China – Daniel Jiawei Li
3rd Runner-Up	Dominican Republic – Ramón Alcántara
4th Runner-Up	Mexico – Gabriel Castañeda
Top 10	Brazil – Danton Miguel; Curaçao – Leonardo Pita Leça; Nigeria – Christopher Chidubem; Thailand – Jack Titus; Zambia – Luay Latif Kalisilira
Top 20	Cambodia – Thoanvannak You; Chile – Álvaro Flores; Czech Republic – Daniel Zedníček; India – Abel Biju; Malaysia – Asyraf Dasley; Philippines – Felipe Marasigan; Puerto Rico – Lazzaro Oertli Ortiz; Turkey – Mete Kayabaş; Venezuela – Juan Carlos da Silva; Vietnam – Nguyễn Hàn Việt

=== Continental titleholders ===
The award was presented to representatives with the highest ranking within the continent, excluding those in the Top 5.

Continent/Region	Contestant
Africa	Zambia – Luay Latif Kalisilira
Americas	Brazil – Danton Miguel
Asia	Thailand – Jack Titus
Caribbean	Curacao – Leonardo Leça
Europe	Czech Republic – Daniel Zedníček

=== Special awards ===
Award	Contestant
Supra Chat	Puerto Rico – Lazzaro Oertli Ortiz
Supra Influencer	Cambodia – Thoanvannak You
Supra Model of The Year	China – Daniel Jiawei Li

== Challenge events ==
=== Supra Chat ===
The Supra Chat with contestants premiered on June 20, 2026, and was broadcast on the official YouTube channel of Mister Supranational. During the event, contestants were grouped into clusters of four to five, where they individually presented themselves. There were eight groups, with winners from each group advancing to the final round of the challenge.

The winner of each group is determined by 60% of the judges' scores and 40% of the popular vote:

- Advanced to the semi-finals of SupraChat.
- Wildcard to the semi-final.

Group	Country or territory					Ref.
1	Belgium	Brazil	~~Cameroon~~	Curaçao	India	
2	Chile	China	Dominican Republic	France	Nigeria	
3	Colombia	Indonesia	Netherlands	Puerto Rico	Sierra Leone	
4	Ecuador	Poland	South Africa	South Korea	United States Virgin Islands	
5	Cuba	Malaysia	Peru	Romania	Zambia	
6	Cambodia	~~Equatorial Guinea~~	Philippines	Spain	Venezuela	
7	Malta	Mexico	Myanmar	~~Sri Lanka~~	Thailand	
8	Canada	Czech Republic	Ireland	United States	Vietnam	
9	Jamaica	Nepal	Sweden	Turkey	—N/a	

==== Final round ====
- Advanced to the Top 20 via Supra Chat.

Results	Country
Winner	Puerto Rico – Lazzaro Oertli Ortiz
Top 10	Brazil – Danton Miguel; China – Daniel Jiawei Li; Mexico – Gabriel Castañeda; Nepal – Mridul Achary; Philippines – Felipe Marasigan; South Korea – Kim Taewoo; Thailand – Jack Titus; United States – Marco Ybarra; Zambia – Luay Latif Kalisilira

=== Supra Model of the Year ===
- Advanced to the Top 20 via Supra Model of the Year.

Placement	Contestant
Winner	China – Daniel Jiawei Li
Top 5	Philippines – Felipe Marasigan; South Africa – Marcél Roux; Spain – Pedro Cordero; Zambia – Luay Latif Kalisilira
Top 10	France – Dimitri Châtelain; Malaysia – Asyraf Dasley; Mexico – Gabriel Castañeda; Puerto Rico – Lazzaro Oertli Ortiz; Sierra Leone – Alhaji Hassan Mansaray

== Contestants ==
41 contestants competed in the pageant.

Country	Contestant	Age	Hometown	Continent	Current/Previous National Qualification	Ref.
Belgium	Quinten Taelman	25	Tielt	Europe	Winner at Mister Belgium Style 2025	
Brazil	Danton Miguel	34	Piraju	Americas	1st runner-up at Mister Brazil CNB 2026	
Cambodia	Thoanvannak You	30	Siem Reap	Asia	Winner at Mister Supranational Cambodia 2026	
Canada	Ossama Mansour	24	Montreal	Americas	Appointed as Mister Supranational Canada 2026	
Chile	Álvaro Carvajal	25	Machalí	Americas	Winner at Mister Chile 2023	
China	Daniel Jiawei Li	36	Shenzhen	Asia	Appointed as Mister Supranational China 2026	
Colombia	Anthoan Ramírez	28	Pereira	Americas	Appointed as Mister Supranational Colombia 2026	
Cuba	Daniel Naranjo	26	Playa	Caribbean	2nd runner-up at Mister Cuba 2024	
Curaçao	Leonardo Leça	27	Harare	Caribbean	Appointed as Mister Supranational Curaçao 2026	
Czech Republic	Daniel Zedníček	31	Bratislava	Europe	Appointed as Mister Supranational Czechia 2026	
Dominican Republic	Ramón Alcántara	27	Miami	Caribbean	Winner at Mister Supranational DR 2026	
Ecuador	Sebastián Jaramillo	29	Quito	Americas	Winner at Mister Supranational Ecuador 2026	
France	Dimitri Chatelain	22	Mouans-Sartoux	Europe	1st runner-up at Mister France 2026	
India	Abel Biju	25	Kottayam	Asia	Top 03 at Mister India 2025	
Indonesia	Jehu Jedija	22	Malang	Asia	4th runner-up at The New L-Men of the Year 2025	
(Republic of Ireland) Ireland	Glenn Williamson	31	Cork	Europe	Winner at Mister Ireland 2023	
Jamaica	Kasheem Green	29	Kingston	Caribbean	Winner at Mister Supranational Jamaica 2026	
Malaysia	Asyraf Dasley	36	Sungai Petani	Asia	Appointed as Mister Supranational Malaysia 2026	
Malta	Wayne Buhagiar	23	Birkirkara	Europe	2nd runner-up at Mister Supranational Malta 2023	
Mexico	Gabriel Castañeda	35	Guadalajara	Americas	Winner at Mister Supranational Mexico 2026	
Myanmar	Thiha Htun	28	Yangon	Asia	Appointed as Mister Supranational Myanmar 2026	
Nepal	Mridul Achary	30	Kathmandu	Asia	Appointed as Mister Supranational Nepal 2026	
Netherlands	Chony Arim	22	Ammerzoden	Europe	Appointed as Mister Supranational Netherlands 2026	
Nigeria	Christopher Chidubem	27	Owerri	Africa	1st runner-up at Mister World Nigeria 2024	
Peru	Jorge Conroy	23	Lima	Americas	Winner at Mister Supranational Peru 2026	
Philippines	Felipe Marasigan	25	Fremont	Asia	Winner at Mister Pilipinas Supranational 2026	`
Poland	Bartosz Gwiazda	25	Płock	Europe	Appointed as Mister Supranational Poland 2026	
Puerto Rico	Lazzaro Oertli Ortiz	27	Tampa	Caribbean	Appointed as Mister Supranational Puerto Rico 2026	
Romania	Alexandru Șuțan	20	Pitești	Europe	Appointed as Mister Supranational Romania 2026	
Sierra Leone	Alhaji Hassan Mansaray	28	Freetown	Africa	Winner at Mister Sierra Leone 2021	
South Africa	Marcél Roux	28	Cape Town	Africa	Winner at Mister South Africa 2024	
South Korea	Kim Taewoo	28	Seoul	Asia	1st runner-up at Mister International Korea 2025	
Spain	Pedro Cordero	23	Cártama	Europe	1st runner-up at Mister RNB España 2023	
Sweden	Benjamin From	22	Stockholm	Europe	Appointed as Mister Supranational Sweden 2026	
Thailand	Jack Titus	34	Pattaya	Asia	Appointed as Mister Supranational Thailand 2026	
Turkey	Mete Kayabaş	22	İzmir	Europe	Winner at Miss & Mr Model of Türkiye 2025	
United States	Marco Ybarra	30	Veracruz	Americas	1st Runner-up at Mister México 2024	
United States Virgin Islands	Makijah Hodge	26	Saint Thomas	Caribbean	Winner at Mister American Virgin Islands 2025	
Venezuela	Juan Carlos da Silva	26	Caracas	Americas	Winner at Mister Supranational Venezuela 2026	
Vietnam	Hàn Việt Nguyễn	23	Nha Trang	Asia	Winner at Nam Vương Du Lịch Việt Nam 2026	
Zambia	Luay Latif Kalisilira	19	Lusaka	Africa	Winner at The Big 5 Pageants Zambia 2026	

== Crossovers ==
Contestants' track records in past beauty pageants:

Year	Pageant	Venue	Contestant	Placement	R
2022	Mister Grand International	Port of Spain, Trinidad and Tobago	Cambodia - Thoanvannak You	Top 12	
2022	Manhunt International	Manila, Philippines	Nigeria - Chris Chidubem	Top 16	
2023	Mister Global	Maha Sarakham, Thailand	Chile - Álvaro Carvajal	2nd runner-up	
2023	Mister Global	Maha Sarakham, Thailand	Spain - Pedro Cordero	Unplaced	
2024	Mister World	Bình Thuận, Vietnam	(Republic of Ireland) Ireland - Glenn Williamson	Unplaced	
2024	Mister World	Bình Thuận, Vietnam	Sierra Leone - Alhaji Mansaray	Top 20	
2025	Man of the Universe	Shenzhen, China	Belgium - Quinten Tælman	1st runner-up	
2025	Mister Tourism World	Ninh Thuận, Vietnam	Malaysia - Asyraf Dasley	Winner	
2025	Mister Model International	Barranquilla, Colombia	Thailand - Jack Titus	Winner	
2025	Mister Mesoamerica International	San Salvador, El Salvador	Cuba - Daniel Naranjo	1st runner-up	
