= Chalti Rahe Zindagi =

- Promotional release poster
- Directed by: Aarti S Bagdi
- Story by: Varsha Kharidaha; Aarti S Bagdi; Shakir Khan; Arun Bhutra
- Produced by: Ajay Kumar Singh; Shakir Khan; Rohandeep Singh
- Cinematography: Dharmendra Singh Bhurji
- Edited by: Sanjay Shri Ingle
- Music by: Sajjad Ali Chandwani; Amit N Dasani; Sarthak Karkare
- Production company: Lovely World Entertainment Production Jumping Tomato Studios
- Distributed by: Zee5
- Release date: 26 July 2024
- Country: India
- Language: Hindi

Chalti Rahe Zindagi is a Hindi film starring Seema Biswas, Barkha Sengupta, Rohit Khandelwal, Indraneil Sengupta, Manjari Fadnis, Siddhanth Kapoor. The film is directed by Aarti S Bagdi and produced by Ajay Kumar Singh, Shakir Khan and Rohandeep Singh.

== Synopsis ==
"Chalti Rahe Zindagi" is set in suburban Mumbai during the early days of the COVID19 pandemic. The story revolves around Krishna Bhagat, a local bread supplier to three families in a housing complex. The announcement of a lockdown triggers significant changes in the lives of these families. Arjun returns home to find his wife having an affair with their neighbor's husband. Forced to quarantine together, Arjun and the neighbor's wife, Aru, develop a unique companionship despite the awkward situation. Pressured by her son Akash, a TV journalist, Sushma demands Krishna return the money she had loaned him. This situation becomes a turning point for Akash, leading him to a personal revelation. Leela, an elderly woman with OCD, creates tension in her household. Her daughter-in-law, Naina, and granddaughter, Siya, struggle to cope with Leela's behaviour. In the end, Leela provides unexpected comfort to her family, helping them bond.

== Production ==
Produced under the banner of Lovely World Entertainment, the film is produced by Ajay Kumar Singh, Shakir Khan and Rohandeep Singh and directed by Aarti S Bagdi. The story is penned by Varsha Kharidaha, Aarti S Bagdi, Shakir Khan and Arun Bhutra. Lyrics by Shakir Khan, Sarthak Karkare, Mayur Puri. Hariharan, Orunima Bhattacharya, Sarthak Karkare, Nutana Mohan have sung the songs, Music by Sajjad Ali Chandwani, Amit N Dasani, Sarthak Karkare and Background Score by Amit N Dasani, Sajjad Ali – Shafaat Ali. Editing by Sanjay Shri Ingle and Director of Photography by Dharmendra Singh Bhurji.

== Cast ==
- Seema Biswas
- Barkha Sengupta
- Indraneil Sengupta
- Rohit Khandelwal
- Manjari Fadnis
- Siddhanth Kapoor
- Trimala Adhikari
- Smita Bharti
- Vaibhav Anand
- Flora Jacob
- Priyal Pandorwala
- Anaya Sivan
- Meira Sengupta
- Harsh Ghoghalia

== Reception ==
The film, shot during peak lockdown, was made with a desire to be authentic. It celebrates the human spirit to defy the odds with hope and courage. It was the Closing Film title at Diorama International Film Festival in New Delhi, won a Jury Special Mention Award in Washington DC for the 12th DCSAFF in December. International Premiere at 25th UK Asian Film Festival, London in May 2023. It did an American Premiere at the 14th Chicago South Asian Film Festival (CSAFF) in September 2023.

Archika Khurana, of The Times of India, fount the film was "a poignant reminder of the pandemic's challenges". In a review for DNA, Riya Sharma, however, found the film was "boring". A review in Times Now praised the acting and plot but criticised the dialogues.
