= Nicklas Pedersen (model) =

Danish model, Mister World 2014, international male pageant winner

- Born: Nicklas Pedersen; 5 May 1990 (age 36); København, Denmark
- Occupation: Carpenter
- Height: 1.81 m (5 ft 11 1/2 in)
- Beauty pageant titleholder
- Title: Mister Denmark 2014; Mister World 2014
- Hair color: Blond
- Eye color: Green
- Major competitions: Mister World 2014 (Winner) (Sports Challenge winner)

Nicklas Pedersen (born 5 May 1990) is a Danish carpenter, model and male pageant winner who was crowned Mister World 2014 at the Riviera International Conference Centre, Torbay, England.

== Pageantry ==
=== Mister World 2014 ===
Pedersen was crowned as Mister World 2014 represented Denmark at the Riviera International Conference Centre, Torbay, on 15 June 2014. He was overcame the 45 contestants to win the Mister World. Additionally, he was awarded as The Sport Challenge Winner. He was nominated into the Top 10 of Extreme Sport Challenge and Top 3 Multi-Media Challenge at the pageant.

During his reign, he travelled to Australia, Brazil, Denmark, France, Malta, Spain, Indonesia, United States and the United Kingdom.

He appeared as emcee at the Variety Telethon in Iowa in March 2015. A benefit for Variety, the Children's Charity - Iowa, United States

Awards and achievements
Preceded by (Colombia) Francisco Escobar	Mister World; 2014	Succeeded by (India) Rohit Khandelwal
