= Rahul Rajasekharan =

Indian model, actor and television personality

Rahul Rajasekharan Nair
- Born: Bangalore, Karnataka, India
- Education: Christ University
- Occupations: Model; actor; television personality
- Beauty pageant titleholder
- Title: Mister Supranational India 2021
- Years active: 2015–present
- Major competitions: Mister India 2015 (1st Runner-up); Mister India Supranational 2021 (Winner); Mister Supranational 2021 (Mister Supranational Asia) (Top 10)

Rahul Rajasekharan Nair is an Indian model, actor and the winner of Mister Supranational India 2021 beauty pageant title. He represented India at Mister Supranational 2021 held on 22 August 2021 at Nowy Sącz, Poland and made it to the Top 10 finalists and also bagged the Mister Supranational Asia 2021 title.

== Early life and career ==
Rahul was born and raised up in Bangalore, Karnataka to Malayali parents hailing from Kottayam, Kerala. After earning his Bachelor of Business Administration degree from Christ University, Rahul worked in the corporate industries for two years before shifting his focus to his passion for modeling and acting.

Rahul made his successful debut in the Malayalam film industry with Diwanjimoola Grand Prix (2018), followed by Varane Avashyamund (2020). Both films were declared box office successes and were well received by the film fraternity.

== Pageantry ==
=== Mister India 2015 ===
In 2015, Rahul participated at the 7th edition of Mister India competition held on 23 July 2015 at Club Royalty, Mumbai, Maharashtra where he ended up as 1st Runner-up to Rohit Khandelwal, who later became the first Indian to win the Mister World title. During the competition, Rahul also won the Best Actor and Mister Ironman sub-titles.

=== Mister Supranational India 2021 ===
In June 2021, Rahul was shortlisted to Top 12 contestants for the Mister Supranational India 2021 title amongst thousands of registrations. Due to the pandemic situation that has paralyzed the country, the entire competition followed the digital course, virtual projection and online interviews. On 8 June 2021, former Mister Supranational India 2019, Varun Verma, announced Rahul as the titleholder of Mister Supranational India 2021 via a video presentation on social media platforms.

=== Mister Supranational 2021 ===
As the winner of Mister Supranational India 2021, Rahul represented India at Mister Supranational 2021 pageant held at Nowy Sącz, Poland on 22 August 2021 where at the end of the event, Nate Crnkovich of United States crowned Varo Vargas of Peru as his successor. Rahul's placement made India's fifth-year streak of placing in the top 10 finalists in Mister Supranational pageant.

== Films ==
Year	Title	Role	Language	Notes
2018	Diwanjimoola Grand Prix	Saththan	Malayalam	Debut movie
2020	Varane Avashyamund	Aby	Malayalam	

== Television ==
Year	Title	Role	Language	Notes
2017	Minute to Win It	Contestant	Malayalam	Finale Winner
2018	Onnum Onnum Moonu	Guest	Malayalam	

Awards and achievements
Preceded by Puneet Beniwal	Mister India 1st Runner-up; 2015	Succeeded by Varun Verma
Preceded by Varun Verma	Mister Supranational India; 2021	Succeeded by Incumbent
