= São João do Oriente =

Municipality in Minas Gerais, Brazil

- Municipality
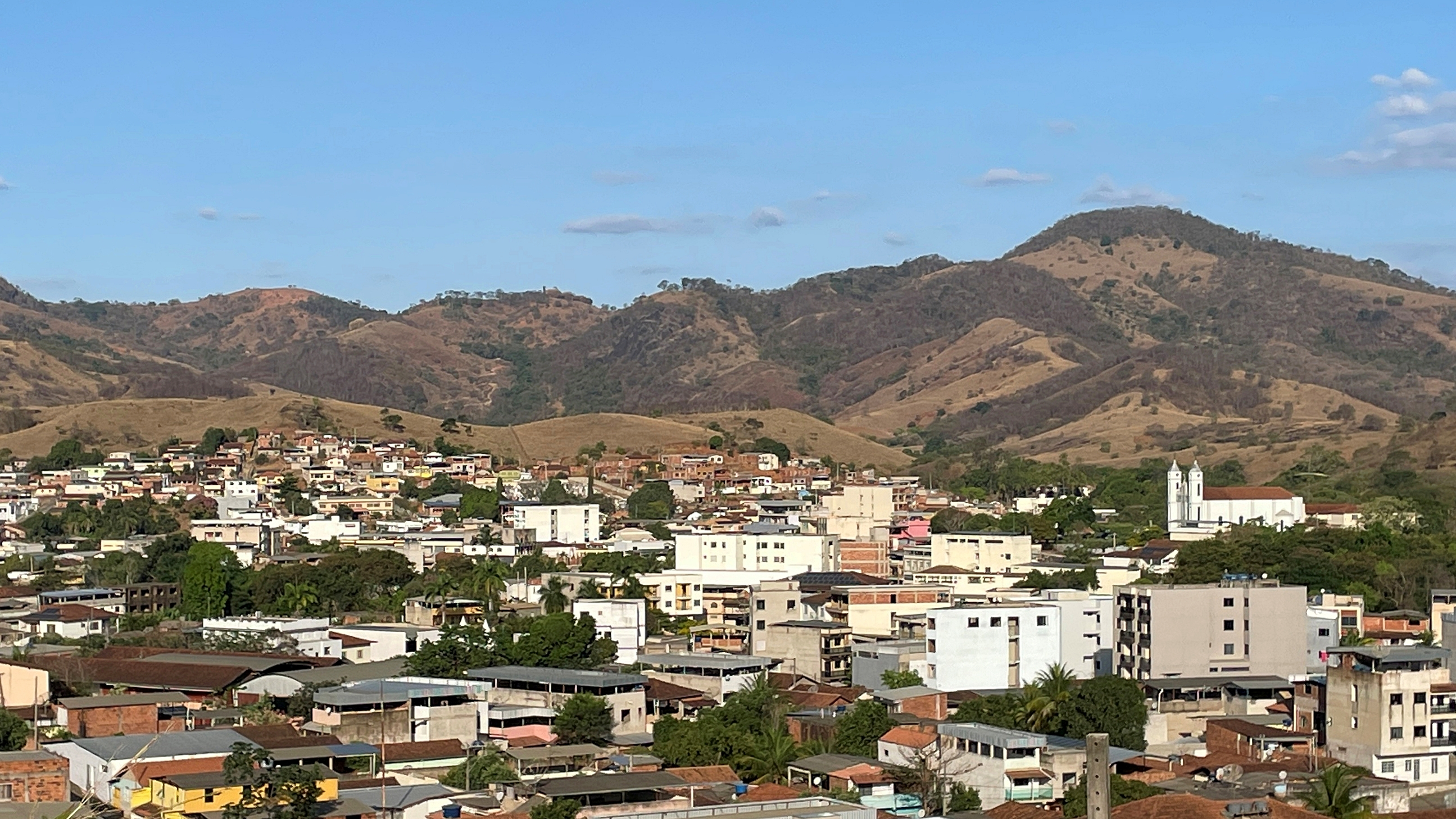
- Partial view of São João do Oriente

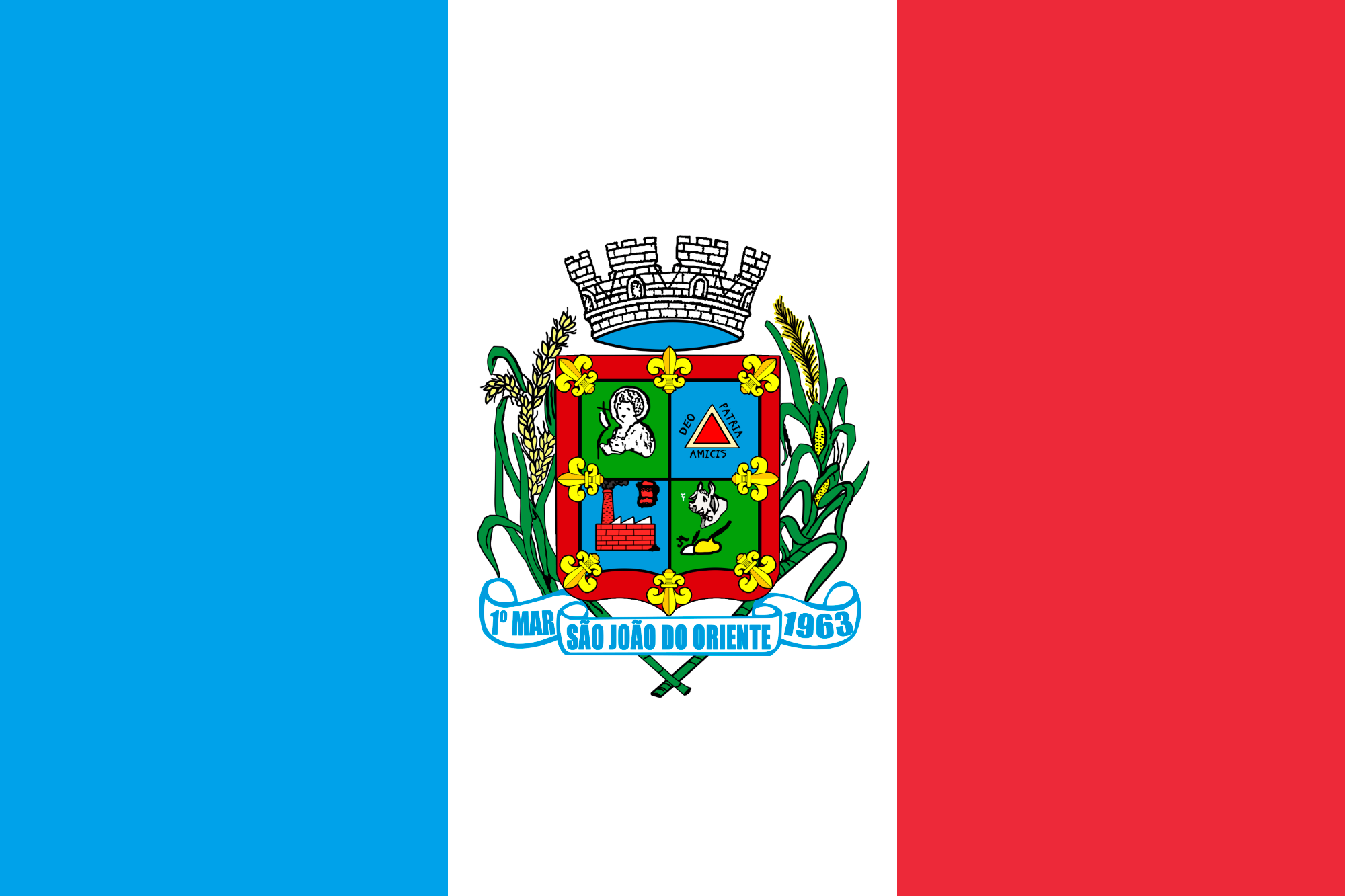
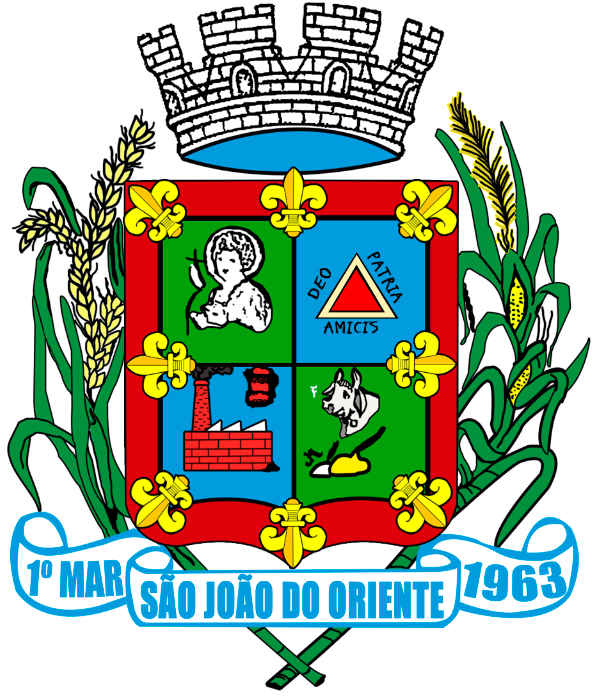
- Flag Coat of arms

- Location in Brazil
- Coordinates: 19°20′20″S 42°9′28″W
- Country: Brazil
- Region: Southeast
- State: Minas Gerais
- Mesoregion: Vale do Rio Doce

Population (2020)
  - Total: 7,444
- Time zone: UTC−3 (BRT)

São João do Oriente is a municipality in the state of Minas Gerais in the Southeast region of Brazil.

== See also ==
- List of municipalities in Minas Gerais
