= Shevam Singh =

Indian model

- Born: Patna, Bihar, India
- Occupations: Model; Entrepreneur
- Height: 1.88 m (6 ft 2 in)
- Beauty pageant titleholder
- Title: Mister India World 2025
- Major competitions: Mister India 2025 (Winner); Mister World 2026 (TBA)

Shevam Singh is an Indian model, entrepreneur and beauty pageant titleholder who was crowned Mister India World 2025 at the Mr India 2025 (Season 2) pageant, held on 21 August 2025 in Mumbai. He is set to represent India at the upcoming Mister World competition.

== Pageantry ==
=== Mister India 2025 ===
On 11 August 2025, Shevam was announced as one of the Top 100 contestants of Mister India 2025. Following the final auditions held in Mumbai on 13 August 2025, he advanced to the Top 22 finalists. At the grand finale, held at One8 Commune in Juhu, Mumbai, on 21 August 2025, Shevam was crowned Mister India World 2025 by his predecessor, Gokul Ganesan. During the competition, he was also among the Top 5 finalists for the Mr Top Model subtitle award.

=== Mister World 2026 ===
Shevam is set to represent India at the Mister World 2026 competition, scheduled to be held in 2026.

Awards and achievements
Preceded by Gokul Ganesan	Mister India World; 2025	Succeeded by Incumbent
