= Abel Biju =

Indian model

Abel Biju Ottappally
- Born: 28 June 2001 (age 25); Kottayam, Kerala, India
- Education: Marian College, Kuttikkanam
- Occupation: Model
- Height: 1.85 m (6 ft 1 in)
- Beauty pageant titleholder
- Title: Mister India Supranational 2025
- Major competitions: Mister India 2025 (Mister India Supranational); Mister Supranational 2026 (Top 20)

Abel Biju (born 29 June 2001) is an Indian model and beauty pageant titleholder who was crowned Mister India Supranational 2026 at the Mr India 2025 (Season 2) pageant, held on 21 August 2025 in Mumbai. He represented India at the Mister Supranational 2026 competition be held on August 1, 2026 in Poland and placed amongst the Top 20 semi-finalists.

== Pageantry ==
=== Mister India 2025 ===
On 11 August 2025, Abel was named among the Top 100 contestants for Mister India 2025. After the final auditions in Mumbai on 13 August 2025, he was selected as one of the Top 22 finalists. At the grand finale, held on 21 August 2025 at One8 Commune in Juhu, Mumbai, Abel was crowned Mister India Supranational 2026, succeeding Shubham Sharma.

=== Mister Supranational 2026 ===
Abel represented India at the Mister Supranational 2026 competition, which to took place in Poland on August 1, 2026 and made it to the Top 20 semi-finalists amongst 41 contestants. During the competition, he was also a Top 10 finalists for Mister Influencer challenge.

Awards and achievements
| Preceded by Shubham Sharma | Mister India Supranational; 2026 | Succeeded by Incumbent |
