= Gokul Ganesan =

Indian model

- Born: 26 November 1999 (age 26); Chennai, Tamil Nadu, India
- Education: Vellore Institute of Technology
- Occupations: Model; Entrepreneur
- Beauty pageant titleholder
- Title: Mister India World 2024
- Years active: 2021–present
- Major competitions: Rubaru Mister India 2022 (Mister India Model International); Mister India 2024 (Winner); Mister World 2024 (Top 10)

Gokul Ganesan (Tamil: கோனுள் கணேச) is an Indian model, entrepreneur and a beauty pageant titleholder who won the Mister India World 2024 title. He represented India at the Mister World 2024 competition, held on November 23, 2024, in Vietnam, and placed among the Top 10 finalists.

== Pageantry ==
=== Rubaru Mister India 2022 ===
In 2022, Gokul participated in the 18th edition of the Rubaru Mister India competition, held at Crowne Plaza Chennai Adyar Park, and won the title of Mister India Model International 2022. He also received the Mister Photogenic and Best Speaker sub-title awards during the competition. However, as the Mister Model International pageant was not held in 2022, he consequently did not participate.

=== Mister India 2024 ===
On July 16, 2024, Gokul was announced as one of the Top 35 contestants of Mister India 2024. He subsequently advanced to the Top 8 finalists after the final auditions in Mumbai on 18 July 2024. Gokul was declared the titleholder of Mister India World 2024 via Mister India's official social media handle on July 20, 2024. He was sashed by Rohit Khandelwal, the winner of the Mister World 2016 title.

=== Mister World 2024 ===
Gokul represented India at the Mister World 2024 competition held on 23 November 2024 in Phan Thiết, Vietnam. During the competition, he placed in the Top 5 of the Multimedia Challenge and Top Model event, Top 20 of the Head-to-Head Challenge, and Top 30 in the Beauty with a Purpose segment. He was also a finalist in the Talent Contest. At the grand finale, he placed among the Top 10 finalists.

Awards and achievements
Preceded by Jitesh Singh Deo	Mister India World; 2024	Succeeded by Shevam Singh
