= Grasim Mr. India =

Indian beauty pageant

Mister India
- Successor: Times Mister India
- Formation: 1996
- Dissolved: 2012
- Type: Beauty Pageant
- Headquarters: Mumbai, India
- Members: Mister World; Mr. International; Mr. Intercontinental; Best Model of the World
- Official language: Hindi, English
- Formerly called: Adonis - Graviera Man of the Year

Grasim Mr. India (formerly Adonis - Graviera Man of the Year) was a national male beauty pageant in India that annually selected representatives to compete globally at Mr. International, Mister World, Mr. Intercontinental and Best Model of the World. In the years 1996 and 1998, the winner of the contest represented India at Mister World contest. Later the title was changed to "Mr. India" International and the winner was sent to compete at Mr. International pageant. Later in 2007 and 2008, Hayward 5000 organized Mr India pageant and the winner was sent to Mister World. In 2010 and 2012, Grasim Mr. India again sent its winner to Mister World and the title was renamed Mr India World. Since 2014, The Times Group owns the right to organize Mr India World contest and its winner represents India at Mister World.

== History ==
The first Mister India called Graviera Adonis Man of the Year contest was held in 1995. Bikram Saluja of Punjab was named the first ever Mister India and represented India at Mister World, where he was placed among top 10 finalists.

== The Pageant ==
In earlier years, the winner of Grasim Mr. India Pageant used to represent India at Mister World contest. From 1997 to 2003 the winner was sent to Mr. International and on some occasions the winner was also sent to compete at other international pageants like Mr. Intercontinental or Best Model of the World.

== Winners ==
Below is the complete list of Mister India editions.

Year	Mister India	State
1994	Bikram Saluja	Punjab
1995	Tarun Raghavan	Maharashtra
1996	Sachin Khurana	Delhi
1997	Deepinder Gill	Punjab
1998	Diwakar Pundir	Uttarakhand
1999	Abhijit Sanyal	Maharashtra
2000	Aryan Vaid	Rajasthan
2001	Vivan Bhatena	Maharashtra
2002	Raghu Mukherjee	Karnataka
2003	Rajneesh Duggal	Delhi
2004	Sunil Mann	Delhi
2005	Viraf Patel	Maharashtra
2006	Rajveer Singh	Delhi
2007	Bharat Kundra	Delhi
2008	Pravesh Rana	Uttar Pradesh
2010	Inder Bajwa	Punjab
2012	Taher Ali	Maharashtra

== India representatives to international pageants ==
The following male models have represented India in international pageants:

Winner	Runner Up	Finalist/Semifinalist

=== Representatives to Mister World ===
- Usually the winner of Mister India pageant represented India at Mister World but if for any reason the winner is unable to compete then a runner up was sent to the pageant.
- India has been participating in Mister World since its inception in 1996. India did not compete in the Mister World from 2000 & 2003. Since 2014 representatives to Mister World are being sent by Mr India World

Year	Mister World India	State	Ranking	Special Awards
1996	Bikram Saluja	Punjab	Top 10	
1998	Sachin Khurana	Delhi	Unplaced	
2007	Kawaljit Anand Singh	Assam	Top 12	
2010	Inder Bajwa	Punjab	Top 15	Mister World Top Model - Top 20; Mister World Talent - Top 20
2012	Taher Ali	Maharashtra	Unplaced	

== Representatives to Mr. International ==
- Usually the winner of Mister India pageant represented India at Mr. International but if for any reason the winner is unable to compete then a runner up is sent to compete at the pageant.

Year	Representative	State	Ranking
1998	Diwakar Pundir	Uttarakhand	Top 12
1999	Abhijit Sanyal	Maharashtra	2nd Runner Up
2000	Aryan Vaid	Rajasthan	Mr. International 2000
2001	Vivan Bhatena	Maharashtra	Top 11
2002	Raghu Mukherjee	Karnataka	Mr. International 2002
2003	Rajneesh Duggal	Delhi	1st Runner Up

== Representatives to Mr. Intercontinental ==
Year	Representative	State	Ranking
1998	Diwakar Pundir	Uttarakhand	2nd Runner Up
1999	Raqesh Bapat	Maharashtra	1st Runner Up
2000	Bikram Singh Sandhu	Punjab	Unplaced
2001	Savio Bruto Da Costa	Goa	1st Runner Up
2002	Saumik Rao	Maharashtra	Top 12

== Representatives to Best Model of the World ==
Year	Representative	State	Ranking
1999	Vishal Yadav	Delhi	2nd Runner Up

== See also ==
- Mister World India
- Sports in India
