= Puneet Beniwal =

Indian Actor and model

- Born: 14 February 1989 (age 37); New Delhi, India
- Education: Sri Guru Gobind Singh College of Commerce (Bachelor of Commerce); Guru Gobind Singh Indraprastha University (MBA)
- Occupations: Model, Actor
- Years active: 2010-present
- Known for: Mr India World (1st Runner Up)
- Modeling information
- Height: 1.89 m (6 ft 2 1/2 in)

Puneet Beniwal (born 14 February 1989) is an Indian model. He was declared as 1st Runner-up at Mr India World 2014.

== Career ==
He was the 1st runner-up of Mister India World 2014.

He has walked the runway for fashion designers like Kenneth Cole, Rohit Bal, Manish Malhotra, Tarun Tahiliani, Raghavendra Rathore, Sabyasachi Mukherjee and others.

== See also ==
- Prateik Jain
- Mr India World
- Sushant Divgikar
- Mr India World 2014
