= Mr India 2014 =

- Date: 8 May 2014
- Venue: D'Bell, Parel, Mumbai, India
- Broadcaster: Zoom TV
- Entrants: 14
- Placements: 5
- Winner: Prateik Jain; Bangalore

Provogue MensXP Mr India World 2014 was a pageant held in Mumbai on May 8, 2014. Fourteen contestants from all over India were chosen as finalists to compete in the main event in Mumbai. 25 years old Prateik Jain from Bangalore was declared Provogue MensXP Mr India World 2014. 25 years old Puneet Beniwal from New Delhi was declared 1st Runner Up and 23 years old Bharat Raj from Chennai was declared 2nd Runner Up.

== Final results ==
Color key

- Declared as Winner
- Ended as Runner-up
- Ended as one of the Finalists or Semi-finalists
- Unplaced

Final Results	Candidate	International Placements
Mister India World 2014	Prateik Jain	Top 10
1st Runner-up	Puneet Beniwal	
2nd Runner-up	Bharat Raj	
Top 5	Pankaj Mundra; Karthik S Shivayanmath	

== Special awards ==
- Special Awards Mr World India 2014

Special Award	contestant
Provogue MenxXP Mr Iron Man	Prateik Jain
Provogue MensXP Mr Taleanted	Pankaj Mundra

== Judges ==
- Arjun Rampal
- Arjan Bajwa
- Manish Malhotra
- Rocky S
- Elli Avram

== Finalists ==
- Fourteen finalists were shortlisted from all over India to compete in the main event.

Contestant	Age	City
Abhijeet Singh	26	Jamshedpur
Arjun Kumar	23	Mumbai
Atul Kumar Tripathi	26	Bangalore
Bharat Raj	23	Chennai
Gurfateh Singh	18	Mumbai
Huzefa Talib	26	Bangalore
Karthik S Shivayanmath	25	Bangalore
Karan Kharas	21	Mumbai
Monik Gupta	26	Mumbai
Pankaj Mundra	23	Mumbai
Prateik Jain	25	Bangalore
Puneet Beniwal	25	New Delhi
Sahil Shah	24	Mumbai
Swapnil Kulkarni	25	Pune
