= Greater Curitiba =

Human settlement in Brazil

Coordinates: 25.4297°S 49.2719°W

Location of the Metropolitan Region of Curitiba

The Metropolitan Region of Curitiba, also known as Greater Curitiba, brings together 29 municipalities in the state of Paraná in a relative process of conurbation. The term refers to the extension of the capital of Paraná, forming with its bordering (or close) municipalities a continuous urban area. The population in 2022, according to the Brazilian Institute for Geography and Statistics was of 3,559,366 inhabitants.

In urban planning circles, the greater Curitiba area has received attention for advancing sustainable urbanization. Its leaders integrated the Bus Rapid Transit (BRT) and city development, using high-capacity, high-quality dedicated busways to guide growth along well-defined lineal axes.
