= Mister World 2014 =

8th Mister World competition, male beauty pageant edition

- Date: 15 June 2014
- Presenters: Megan Young; Frankie Cena
- Venue: Torbay, England
- Entrants: 46
- Placements: 10
- Debuts: Ghana; Moldova; Switzerland
- Withdrawals: Belgium; Bulgaria; Costa Rica; Croatia; Czech Republic; Greece; Honduras; Luxembourg; Macau; Mongolia; New Zealand; Singapore; Vietnam
- Returns: Australia; Austria; Curaçao; Denmark; Dominican Republic; South Korea; Nigeria; Romania; Sri Lanka; Swaziland
- Winner: Nicklas Pedersen; Denmark

Mister World 2014 was the 8th edition of the Mister World competition. It was held at The Riviera International Conference Centre in Torbay, Devon, England on June 15, 2014. Francisco Javier Escobar Parra of Colombia crowned Nicklas Pedersen of Denmark at the end of the event.

== Results ==
=== Placements ===
Placement	Contestant
Mister World 2014	Denmark – Nicklas Pedersen
1st Runner-Up	Nigeria – Emmanuel Ikubese
2nd Runner-Up	Mexico – José Pablo Minor
Top 10	Curacao – Zuemerik Veeris; England – Jordan Williams; India – Prateik Jain; Moldova – Valeriu Gutu; Netherlands – Demian Overduijn; Puerto Rico - Alberto Martinez; Ukraine - Bohdan Yusypchuk

=== Fast Track Events ===
Awards	Contestant
Fashion & Style Winner	Nigeria – Emmanuel Ikubese
Multimedia Winner	Netherlands – Demian Overduijn
Sports Winner	Denmark – Nicklas Pedersen
Talent Winner	Curacao – Zuemerik Veeris
Extreme Challenge Winner	Moldova – Valeriu Gutu

=== Talent ===
Final results	Contestant
Winner	Curaçao – Zuemerik Veeris
Top 4	England – Jordan Williams; Netherlands – Demian Overduijn; Ukraine – Bohdan Yusypchuk
Top 13	Australia – Nick Kennett; Ghana – Nii Tackie Laryea; Ireland – Karl Bowe; Mexico – José Pablo Minor; Nigeria – Emmanuel Ikubese; Northern Ireland – Dwayne-Andrew Kerr; Peru – Diego Gutiérrez; Puerto Rico – Alberto Krezner; Swaziland – Bonelelwe Makhanya
Top 21	Argentina – José Santillán; France – Thibault Marchand; Guadeloupe – Borys Marester; India – Prateik Jain; Japan – Tsuyoshi Akaboya; Moldova – Valeriu Gutu; Poland – Michał Rostek; South Africa – Matthew Fincham
Top 28	Austria – Philipp Knefz; Canada – Stewart Kwon Jin-seon; Colombia – Tomás Marín; Lebanon – Ayman Moussa; Paraguay – Joaquín Sandoval; Spain – José Ignacio (Nacho) Ros; Wales – Michael-Rae Formston

=== Multimedia Challenge ===
The winners of the Multimedia Award were announced during the coronation show.

Final results	Contestant
Winner	Netherlands – Demian Overduijn
1st Runner-Up	India – Prateik Jain
2nd Runner-Up	Denmark – Nicklas Pedersen

=== Extreme Challenge ===
The Extreme Sports Challenge was held on June 3 at Royal Marine Commando Training Centre in Lympstone.

Final results	Contestant
Winner	Moldova – Valeriu Gutu
1st Runner-Up	Austria – Philipp Knefz
2nd Runner-Up	Ukraine – Bohdan Yusypchuk
Top 10	Argentina – José Santillán; Denmark – Nicklas Pedersen; England – Jordan Williams; Philippines – John Spainhour; Puerto Rico – Alberto Krezner; Romania – Bogdan Mierla; Venezuela – Jesús Sarmiento
Top 24	Australia – Nick Kennett; Canada – Stewart Kwon Jin-seon; Colombia – Tomás Marín; Ghana – Nii Tackie Laryea; Guadeloupe – Borys Marester; India – Prateik Jain; Ireland – Karl Bowe; Latvia – Ivans Jevstigņejevs; Mexico – José Pablo Minor; Netherlands – Demian Overduijn; Peru – Diego Gutiérrez; Poland – Michał Rostek; Spain – José Ignacio Ros; Wales – Michael-Rae Formston

=== Sports ===
Final results	Contestant
Winner	Denmark – Nicklas Pedersen
Top 3	Bahamas – DeVaughn Gow; France – Thibault Marchand

Sports Events	Winners
Sailing (Team)	Blue Team: Bahamas – DeVaughn Gow; England – Jordan Williams; France – Thibault Marchand; Guadeloupe – Borys Marester; Lebanon – Ayman Moussa; Malta – Björn Demicoli; Nigeria – Emmanuel Ikubese; Northern Ireland – Dwayne-Andrew Kerr; Philippines – John Spainhour; South Africa – Matthew Fincham; Swaziland – Bonelelwe Makhanya; Wales – Michael-Rae Formston
Sailing (Individual)	Bahamas – DeVaughn Gow
The Tyre Race	Red Team: Austria – Philipp Knefz; Brazil – Reinaldo Dalcin; Denmark – Nicklas Pedersen; Romania – Bogdan Mierla
The Shot Put	Bahamas – DeVaughn Gow (tied); India – Prateik Jain (tied)
The Tug-O-War	Yellow Team: India – Prateik Jain; Ireland – Karl Bowe; Italy – Adamo Pasqualon; Latvia – Ivans Jevstigņejevs; Moldova – Valeriu Gutu; Russia – Mails Makkarti; Sri Lanka – Angelo Barnes; Turkey – Efekan Akal
Penalty Shootout	Peru – Diego Gutiérrez

=== Fashion & Style ===
The Fashion & Style Challenge winner was announced during the coronation show.

Final results	Contestant
Winner	Nigeria – Emmanuel Ikubese

== Teams ==
Team	Red Team	Green Team	Yellow Team	Blue Team
Countries	Australia; Austria; Bolivia; Brazil; China; Denmark; Japan; South Korea; Puerto Rico; Romania	Argentina; Canada; Curaçao; Dominican Republic; Ghana; Mexico; Netherlands; Paraguay; Poland; Spain; Ukraine; Venezuela	Colombia; Germany; India; Ireland; Italy; Latvia; Moldova; Peru; Russia; Sri Lanka; Switzerland; Turkey	Bahamas; England; France; Guadeloupe; Lebanon; Malta; Nigeria; Northern Ireland; Philippines; South Africa; Swaziland; Wales

== Judges ==
The judges' panel for Mister World 2014 consisted of the following personalities:

- Julia Morley – chairwoman and CEO of Miss World LTD
- Mike Dixon – Musical director
- Donna Derby – Choreographer & Stage Director
- Andrew Minarik – Hair, Make-up and Stylist expert
- Pilín León – Miss World 1981 from Venezuela
- Erin Holland – Miss World Australia 2013

== Contestants ==
46 contestants competed for the title

Country/Territory	Contestant	Age	Height	Hometown
Argentina	José Santillán	25	1.83 m (6 ft 0 in)	Córdoba
Australia	Nick Kennett	25	1.84 m (6 ft 1/2 in)	Adelaide
Austria	Philipp Knefz	21	1.85 m (6 ft 1 in)	Fohnsdorf
Bahamas	DeVaughn Gow	28	1.93 m (6 ft 4 in)	Nassau
Bolivia	Anyelo Roca	18	1.96 m (6 ft 5 in)	Cochabamba
Brazil	Reinaldo Dalcin	28	1.80 m (5 ft 11 in)	Canoas
Canada	Stewart Kwon Jin-seon	26	1.80 m (5 ft 11 in)	Vancouver
China	Tang Hongzhen	25	1.90 m (6 ft 3 in)	Wuhan
Colombia	Tomás Marín	28	1.90 m (6 ft 3 in)	Medellín
Curaçao	Zuemerik Veeris	22	1.94 m (6 ft 4 1/2 in)	Willemstad
Denmark	Nicklas Pedersen	23	1.81 m (5 ft 11 1/2 in)	Copenhagen
Dominican Republic	Braylin Núñez	22	1.88 m (6 ft 2 in)	Santiago de los Caballeros
England	Jordan Williams	26	1.85 m (6 ft 1 in)	Hinckley
France	Thibault Marchand	21	1.93 m (6 ft 4 in)	Tracy-le-Mont
Germany	Yasin Bozkurt	23	1.86 m (6 ft 1 in)	Cologne
Ghana	Nii Tackie Laryea	23	1.77 m (5 ft 9 1/2 in)	Accra
Guadeloupe	Borys Marester	22	1.77 m (5 ft 9 1/2 in)	Pointe-à-Pitre
India	Prateik Jain	25	1.91 m (6 ft 3 in)	Bangalore
Ireland	Karl Bowe	25	1.91 m (6 ft 3 in)	Dublin
Italy	Adamo Pasqualon	21	1.96 m (6 ft 5 in)	San Giorgio delle Pertiche
Japan	Tsuyoshi Akaboya	21	1.89 m (6 ft 2 1/2 in)	Tokyo
Latvia	Ivans Jevstigņejevs	25	1.90 m (6 ft 3 in)	Riga
Lebanon	Ayman Moussa	28	1.85 m (6 ft 1 in)	Beirut
Malta	Björn Demicoli	22	1.85 m (6 ft 1 in)	Pietà
Mexico	José Pablo Minor	23	1.86 m (6 ft 1 in)	Mexico City
Moldova	Valeriu Gutu	22	1.84 m (6 ft 1/2 in)	Chișinău
Netherlands	Demian Overduijn	23	1.80 m (5 ft 11 in)	Venlo
Nigeria	Emmanuel Ikubese	25	1.88 m (6 ft 2 in)	Lagos
Northern Ireland	Dwayne-Andrew Kerr	21	1.83 m (6 ft 0 in)	Craigavon
Paraguay	Joaquín Sandoval	20	1.93 m (6 ft 4 in)	Luque
Peru	Diego Conroy	22	1.82 m (5 ft 11 1/2 in)	Lima
Philippines	John Spainhour	26	1.85 m (6 ft 1 in)	Manila
Poland	Michał Rostek	24	1.87 m (6 ft 1 1/2 in)	Warsaw
Puerto Rico	Alberto Kezner	19	1.85 m (6 ft 1 in)	Bayamón
Romania	Bogdan Mierla	22	1.86 m (6 ft 1 in)	Suceava
Russia	Mails Makkarti	24	1.95 m (6 ft 5 in)	Moscow
South Africa	Matthew Fincham	27	1.84 m (6 ft 1/2 in)	Pretoria
South Korea	Lim Jae-yeon	20	1.88 m (6 ft 2 in)	Seoul
Spain	José Ignacio Ros	27	1.84 m (6 ft 1/2 in)	Madrid
Sri Lanka	Angelo Barnes	25	1.80 m (5 ft 11 in)	Batticaloa
Swaziland	Bonelelwe Makhanya	21	1.80 m (5 ft 11 in)	Mbabane
Switzerland	Bruno Viglezio	21	1.83 m (6 ft 0 in)	Sorengo
Turkey	Efekan Akal	22	1.93 m (6 ft 4 in)	Istanbul
Ukraine	Bohdan Yusypchuk	25	1.84 m (6 ft 1/2 in)	Kyiv
Venezuela	Jesús Sarmiento	25	1.93 m (6 ft 4 in)	Barinas
Wales	Michael-Rae Formston	27	1.85 m (6 ft 1 in)	Bristol

== Notes ==
=== Debuts ===
- Ghana
- Moldova
- Switzerland

=== Returns ===
Last competed in 2007:

- Austria
- Curaçao

Last competed in 2010:

- Australia
- Denmark
- Dominican Republic
- Nigeria
- Romania
- Sri Lanka
- Swaziland

=== Crossovers ===
Manhunt International

- 2012: Latvia – Ivans Jevstigņejevs (Top 15)

Mister International

- 2014: Ukraine – Bohdan Romanovych Yusypchuk (Top 15)

Mister Global

- 2016: Canada – Stewart Kwon Jin-seon

Mister Model International

- 2018: Peru – Diego Marco Conroy Gutiérrez (3rd runner-up)
