= Mister Supranational 2021 =

5th Mister Supranational pageant, beauty pageant edition

- Date: 22 August 2021
- Presenters: Anna Matlewska; Ivan Podrez
- Theme: Aspirational • Inspirational
- Venue: Strzelecki Park Amphitheater, Nowy Sącz, Małopolska, Poland
- Entrants: 34
- Placements: 20
- Debuts: Aruba; Greece; Haiti; Morocco; Nepal; North Macedonia; Sierra Leone; Singapore
- Withdrawals: Laos; Malaysia; Suriname; Vietnam
- Returns: Belgium; Panama; Togo
- Winner: Varo Vargas; Peru
- Congeniality: Cho Young-Dong (Korea)
- Photogenic: William Badell (Venezuela)

Mister Supranational 2021 was the fifth edition of the Mister Supranational pageant. It was held on August 22, 2021 in Nowy Sącz, Poland. Nate Crnkovich of the United States crowned Varo Vargas of Peru as his successor at the end of the event. This edition marks the first time in history that Peru won the Mister Supranational pageant, the second South American country and the third Latin American country to do so.

The edition was originally scheduled at the end of 2020 but was postponed due to the global COVID-19 pandemic.

== Background ==
On 14 April 2021, Gerhard Parzutka von Lipinski, the president of Miss and Mister Supranational, announced that Mister Supranational 2021 is scheduled to be held on 22 August in Strzelecki Park Amphitheater, Nowy Sącz, Małopolska, Poland.

== Results ==
=== Placements ===
Placement	Contestant
Mister Supranational 2021	Peru – Varo Vargas
1st Runner-Up	Togo – Abdel Kacem Tefridj Δ
2nd Runner-Up	Venezuela – William Badell
3rd Runner-Up	Nepal – Santosh Upadhyaya Δ
4th Runner-Up	Spain – Lucas Muñoz-Alonso
Top 10 (in order of placements)	Mexico – Gustavo Rosas; Malta – Raffael Fiedler; India – Rahul Rajasekharan Δ; Dominican Republic – Ivan Oleaga; Indonesia – Okky Alparessi §
Top 20 (in order of placements)	Czech Republic – David Kremen; Puerto Rico – Francisco Vergara; Slovakia – Marek Jastráb; Colombia – Manuel Molano; Poland – Daniel Borzewski; Haiti – Theodore Bien-Aime; Philippines – John Adajar; France – Fabien Mounoussamy; Aruba – Derrel Lampe; Greece – Spyros Nikolaidis

Notes:
§ – placed into the Top 10 by fan-voting challenge
Δ – placed into the Top 20 by fast-track challenges

=== Continental Titleholders ===
Continent	Contestant	Ref.
Africa	Sierra Leone – Abu "Bakarr" Bakish Tarawalie	
Americas	Mexico – Gustavo Rosas	
Asia	India – Rahul Rajasekharan	
Caribbean	Dominican Republic – Ivan Olga	
Europe	Malta – Raffael Fiedler	

=== Special awards ===
Final results	Contestant	Ref.
Mister Friendship	South Korea – Cho Young-Dong	
Mister Fitness	United States – Felix Martin	
Mister Talent	Poland – Daniel Borzewski	
Mister Photogenic	Venezuela – William Badell	
Supra Chat	India – Rahul Rajasekharan	
Mister Influencer	Nepal – Santosh Upadhyaya	
Top Model	Togo – Abdel Kacem Tefridj	
Supra Fan Vote	Indonesia – Okky Alparessi	
Mister Hotel Beskid	Indonesia – Okky Alparessi	
Mister Gold Spa	Malta – Raffael Fiedler	
Mister Personality	Aruba – Derrel Lampe	

== Challenge events ==
=== Supra Chat ===
==== Round 1 ====
- Advanced to Semifinals

Group	Country 1	Country 2	Country 3	Country 4	Country 5	Country 6	Country 7	Ref.
1	Malaysia	Nepal	Philippines	Poland	Singapore	Togo	Thailand	
2	Brazil	Colombia	Dominican Republic	Ecuador	Mexico	Panama	Puerto Rico	
3	India	South Korea	Netherlands	Slovakia	South Africa	Sierra Leone	—N/a	
4	Aruba	France	Haiti	Indonesia	Malta	Morocco	Romania	
5	Czech Republic	Greece	North Macedonia	Peru	Spain	United States	Venezuela	

==== Final result ====
The winner of Supra Chat will automatically advance to the Top 20 semifinalists of Mister Supranational 2021.

Results	Country	Ref.
Winner	India – Rahul Rajasekharan	
Top 5	Brazil - João Henrique Lemes; Indonesia – Okky Alparessi; Singapore - Sauffi Gonzales; Venezuela – William Badell	

=== Top Model ===
The winner of Top Model will automatically advance to the Top 20 semifinalists of Mister Supranational 2021.

Result	Country
Winner	Togo – Abdel Kacem Tefridj
Top 3	Colombia – Manuel Molano; Malta – Raffael Fiedler
Top 11	Belgium – Jean Atekha; Mexico – Gustavo Rosas; Morocco – Walid Chakir; Peru – Varo Vargas; Sierra Leone – Abu Bakarr Bakish Tarawalie; Slovakia – Marek Jastráb; Spain – Lucas Muñoz-Alonso; Venezuela – William Badell

=== Supra Fan Vote ===
The winner of the Supra Fan Vote will automatically advance to the Top 10 finalists of Mister Supranational 2021.

Result	Country
Winner	Indonesia – Okky Alparessi
Top 10	Brazil – João Henrique Lemes; Ecuador – Mario Iglesias; France – Fabien Mounoussamy; India – Rahul Rajasekharan; Philippines – John Adajar; Nepal – Santosh Upadhyaya; Peru – Varo Vargas; South Africa – Akshar Birbal; Thailand – Nipun Kaewruan

=== Mister Talent ===
Result	Country
Winner	Poland – Daniel Borzewski
Top 5	Nepal – Santosh Upadhyaya; Peru – Varo Vargas; Puerto Rico – Francisco Vergara; Thailand – Nipun Kaewruan

==== Challenge Finalists ====
Challenge	Country	Ref.
Challenge 1 (Top 10)	Brazil – João Henrique Lemes; France – Fabien Mounoussamy; India – Rahul Rajasekharan; Indonesia – Okky Alparessi; Malta – Raffael Fiedler; Nepal – Santosh Upadhyaya; Peru – Varo Vargas; Philippines – John Adajar; Sierra Leone – Abu Bakarr Bakish Tarawalie; South Africa – Akshar Birbal	
Challenge 2 (Top 10)	Brazil – João Henrique Lemes; India – Rahul Rajasekharan; Indonesia – Okky Alparessi; South Korea – Cho Young-Dong; Morocco – Walid Chakir; Nepal – Santosh Upadhyaya; Philippines – John Adajar; Poland – Daniel Borzewski; Singapore – Sauffi Gonzales; United States – Felix Martin	
Challenge 3 (Top 11)	Czech Republic – David Kremen; India – Rahul Rajasekharan; South Korea – Cho Young-Dong; Malta – Raffael Fiedler; Nepal – Santosh Upadhyaya; North Macedonia – Denis Aljush; Philippines – John Adajar; Romania – Geany Daniel Zamfir; Singapore – Sauffi Gonzales; Slovakia – Marek Jastráb; Thailand – Nipun Kaewruan	
Challenge 4 (Top 10)	Brazil - João Henrique Lemes; Colombia - Manuel Molano; India - Rahul Rajasekharan; Indonesia - Okky Alparessi; Nepal - Santosh Upadhyaya; Poland - Daniel Borzewski; Romania - Geany Daniel Zamfir; Singapore - Sauffi Gonzales; Togo - Abdel Kacem Tefridj; United States - Felix Martin	
Challenge 5 (Top 10)	Brazil - João Henrique Lemes; France – Fabien Mounoussamy; India – Rahul Rajasekharan; Indonesia – Okky Alparessi; South Korea – Cho Young-Dong; Nepal – Santosh Upadhyaya; North Macedonia – Denis Aljush; Poland – Daniel Borzewski; Slovakia – Marek Jastráb; Thailand – Nipun Kaewruan	

==== Final result ====
The winner of Supra Influencer will automatically advance to the Top 20 semifinalists of Mister Supranational 2021.

Results	Country	Ref.
Winner	Nepal - Santosh Upadhyaya	
Top 10	Brazil - João Henrique Lemes; France - Fabien Mounoussamy; India - Rahul Rajasekharan; Indonesia - Okky Alparessi; South Korea - Cho Young-Dong; Philippines - John Adajar; Poland - Daniel Borzewski; Singapore - Sauffi Gonzales; Thailand - Nipun Kaewruan	

== Contestants ==
34 delegates from around the world have been selected to participate and have competed for the title of Mister Supranational 2021.

Country/Territory	Delegate	Age (Note: Ages at the time of the pageant)	Hometown	Continental Group
Aruba	Derrel Lampe	29	Santa Cruz	Caribbean
Belgium	Jean Atekha	27	Aalst	Europe
Brazil	João Henrique Lemes	22	Santiago	Americas
Colombia	Manuel Molano	29	Bogotá	Americas
Czech Republic	David Kremen	30	Miroslav	Europe
Dominican Republic	Ivan Oleaga	30	Santo Domingo	Caribbean
Ecuador	Mario Iglesias	30	Portoviejo~	Americas
France	Fabien Mounoussamy	25	Réunion	Europe
Greece	Spyros Nikolaidis	27	Thessaloniki	Europe
Haiti	Theodore Bien-Aime (Note: 1st Runner-up Mister Supra Star Search 2020)	28	Port-au-Prince	Caribbean
India	Rahul Rajasekharan	32	Kerala	Asia
Indonesia	Okky Alparessi	28	Binjai	Asia
Malta	Raffael Fiedler	29	Marsaskala	Europe
Mexico	Gustavo Rosas	29	Sinaloa	Americas
Morocco	Walid Chakir	26	Casablanca	Africa
Nepal	Santosh Upadhyaya (Note: Mister Supra Star Search 2020)	30	Achham	Asia
Netherlands	Sebastian Martinez	25	Zaandam	Europe
North Macedonia	Denis Aljush (Note: 2nd Runner-Up Mister Supra Star Search 2020)	31	Skopje	Europe
Panama	Luis José Baloyes Vega	22	La Arena	Americas
Peru	Varo Vargas	31	Lima	Americas
Philippines	John Adajar	30	Laguna	Asia
Poland	Daniel Borzewski	25	Nowe Radzikowo	Europe
Puerto Rico	Francisco Vergara	29	San Juan	Caribbean
Romania	Geany Daniel Zamfir	28	Brassó	Europe
Sierra Leone	Abu Bakarr "Bakish" Tarawalie	28	Bombali District	Africa
Singapore	Sauffi Gonzales	27	Singapore	Asia
Slovakia	Marek Jastráb	28	Myjava	Europe
South Africa	Akshar Birbal	25	Durban	Africa
South Korea	Cho Young-Dong	29	Seoul	Asia
Spain	Lucas Muñoz-Alonso	28	Ciudad Real	Europe
Thailand	Nipun Kaewruan	19	Bangkok	Asia
Togo	Abdel Kacem Tefridj	25	Lomé	Africa
United States	Felix Ray Martin II	32	Hollywood	Americas
Venezuela	William Badell	25	Maracaibo	Americas

== Notes ==
=== Debut ===
- Aruba
- Greece
- Haiti
- Morocco
- Nepal
- North Macedonia
- Sierra Leone
- Singapore

=== Returns ===
Last competed in 2016:

- Belgium

Last competed in 2018:

- Panama
- Togo

=== Withdrawals ===
- Laos – Phimmasone Singsavanh did not compete in the fifth edition due to the new coronavirus (COVID-19) visa restrictions.
- Malaysia – Malaysia was set to debut in this edition however the Malaysia's representative, Wan Mohammad Aiman was unable to compete due to having problems with visa restrictions.
- Mauritius – Jean-Laurent David did not compete in the fifth edition due to the new coronavirus (COVID-19) visa restrictions.
- Suriname – Glaucio Stekkel didn't in the fifth edition due to the new coronavirus (COVID-19) visa restrictions.
