= Rohit Khandelwal =

Indian model, actor and television personality

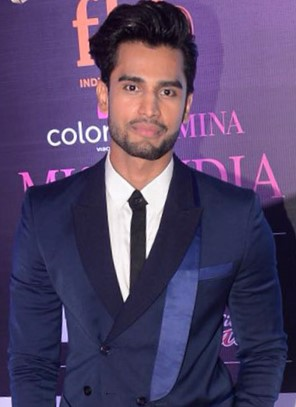
- Khandelwal at Femina Miss India 2018
- Born: 19 August 1989 (age 37); Hyderabad, Andhra Pradesh (now in Telangana), India
- Education: Aurora Degree College
- Occupations: Model; actor; television personality
- Beauty pageant titleholder
- Title: Mister World 2016; Mister World Asia & Oceania; Mister World Multimedia; Mr India 2015
- Years active: 2012–present
- Major competitions: Mr India 2015 (Winner); Mister World 2016 (Winner) (Mister World Asia & Oceania) (Mister World Multimedia)

Rohit Khandelwal (born 19 August 1989) is an Indian actor, model, tv host and beauty pageant titleholder who the winner of Mr India 2015 and the first ever Indian and Asian to be crowned Mister World 2016.

== Early life ==
Khandelwal was born in Hyderabad, Andhra Pradesh (now Telangana). He is a Marwari with family roots in Rajasthan. He is a graduate from Aurora Degree College and worked as a ground staff for SpiceJet and then as a technical support assistant for Dell Computers.

== Career ==
His first television advertisement was a jewellery advertisement with Kareena Kapoor. Later he appeared in other advertisements.

He made his television show debut in episode 76 of Yeh Hai Aashiqui, an Indian television series that presented dramatisation of love stories and aired on Bindass. Later he played role of Bhuvan, the leader of handloom weavers on the television series ‘’Million Dollar Girl’’, which was televised by Channel V. Growing up in Hyderabad, he was not fluent in Hindi so he had to take Hindi diction classes to learn the language.

In 2015, he won the Mr India 2015 contest held on 23 July 2015 at Club Royalty in Mumbai, Maharashtra. He also won two special awards at the contest, "Stay-On Mr Active" and "Provogue Personal Care Best Actor".

In 2016, he passed down his Mr India crown to Vishnu Raj Menon who was announced as Mr India 2016 by Hrithik Roshan who attended as main guest to the gala event which was held in Mumbai.

== Mr World 2016 ==
Khandelwal became the first Asian to win the title of Mister World on 19 July 2016 at Southport Theatre, Floral Hall, The Promenade, Southport. The competition saw 47 participants from around the world. Khandelwal received a cash prize of $50,000. He also competed for various sub-titles at the pageant, including Mr. World Multimedia Award, Mr. World Talent, Mobstar People's Choice Awards and Mr. World Sports Event, winning Mr. World Multimedia Award.

== Filmography ==
=== Films ===
Year	Title	Role	Notes	Ref.
2011	The Journey	Siddarth	Short film	
2024	Chalti Rahe Zindagi	Akash		

=== Television ===
Year	Title	Role	Notes	Ref.
2014	Yeh Hai Aashiqui	Veer	Episodic appearance	
2014	Million Dollar Girl	Bhuvan		
2015	Pyaar Tune Kya Kiya	Chris	Episodic appearance	
2015	MTV Big F	Varun Kohli	Episode: "Pati, Patni aur Pilot"	
2016	Pyaar Tune Kya Kiya	Sreedhar	Season 6, Episode 19	
2024	Cheakmate			

=== Music videos ===
Year	Title	Singer(s)	Ref.
2021	Rihaee	Yasser Desai	
2022	Jo Mujhe Deewana Karde	Tulsi Kumar, Manan Bhardwaj	
2022	Heer Ranjha	Rito Riba	

Awards and achievements
Preceded by (Denmark) Nicklas Pedersen	Mister World; 2016	Succeeded by (England) Jack Heslewood
Preceded by (India) Prateik Jain	Mister World - Asia and Oceania; 2016	Succeeded by (Philippines) Jody Baines Saliba
Preceded by (Netherlands) Demian Overduijn	Mister World - Multimedia Award; 2016	Succeeded by (Nepal) Akshay Rayamajhi
Preceded by Prateik Jain	Mr India World; 2015	Succeeded by Vishnu Raj Menon
