= Mr India 2017 =

Indian beauty pageant

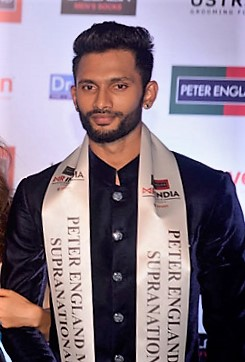
- Prathamesh Maulingkar Mr India Supranational 2017
- Date: 14 December 2017
- Presenters: Rohit Khandelwal; Raageshwari
- Venue: Castella de Aguada, Mumbai, Maharashtra, India
- Broadcaster: Zoom
- Entrants: 16
- Placements: 4
- Congeniality: Amit Om Malik
- Photogenic: Prathamesh Maulingkar

Peter England Mr India 2017 was a contest held on 14 December in Mumbai. Sixteen contestants from all over the country were shortlisted to compete in the finals. Previous year's winner, Mr India 2016, Vishnu Raj Menon passed on his title to Jitesh Singh Deo of Lucknow. Bollywood actress Kangana Ranaut took part of the event to felicitate the winners.

Prathamesh Maulingkar of Goa titled Mr India Supranational 2017 and represented the nation at Mister Supranational 2018 on 8 December where he won the title. He became the first Asian to win the Mister Supranational title.

== Results ==
Color keys

- The contestant secured victory in an international pageant.
- The contestant finished as a runner-up in an international pageant.
- The contestant reached the semi-finals in an international pageant.

Placement	Contestant	International Placement
Mister India Supranational 2017	Prathamesh Maulingkar	Winner – Mister Supranational 2018
Mister India World 2017	Jitesh Singh Deo	Did not compete
1st Runner-Up	Abhi Khajuria	
2nd Runner-Up	Pavan Rao	

=== Special awards ===
Award	Contestant
Mr. Congeniality	Amit Om Malik
Mr. Perfect Body	Balaji Murugadoss
Balenzia Top Model	Kamlesh Solanki
Dr. Tvacha Mr. Healthy Hair	Krushal Ahuja
Peter England Mr. Style Icon	Lakshya Sharma
Zeven Mr. Active	Pavan Rao
Mr. Talented	Pavan Rao
Mr. Photogenic	Prathamesh Maulingkar
Mr. Vibrant	Pavan Rao
Times Man with a Voice	Sagar Arora
Times Best Actor	Vishal Choudhary

== Contestants ==
16 contestants from all over India were shortlisted to compete in the main event in Mumbai.

Contestant No.	Name	State	Profession
01	Abhi Khajuria	Chandigarh	Cabin crew
02	Amit Om Malik	Panipat	Fitness Trainer
03	Ankit Sharma	Jammu	Business Man
04	Balaji Murugadoss	Chennai	Entrepreneur, Model, Actor
05	Jitesh Singh Deo	Lucknow	Actor
06	Kamlesh Solanki	Chennai	Entrepreneur, model
07	Junaid Khan	Kashmir	Actor
08	Krushal Ahuja	Kolkata	Self Employed
09	Lakshya Sharma	New Delhi	Model
10	Pavan Rao	Mumbai	Actor, Model, Dancer
11	Prathamesh Maulingkar	Goa	Entrepreneur, model, Dancer
12	Priyank Sharma	Jaipur	Actor, model
13	Sagar Arora	Ludhiana	Model
14	Sanam Bariar	Chandigarh	Actor, model
15	SK Tanveer Hussain	Kolkata	Model
16	Vishal Choudhary	Jaipur	Engineer

Mister International

- 2019: Balaji Murugadoss
