= Oberon Mall =

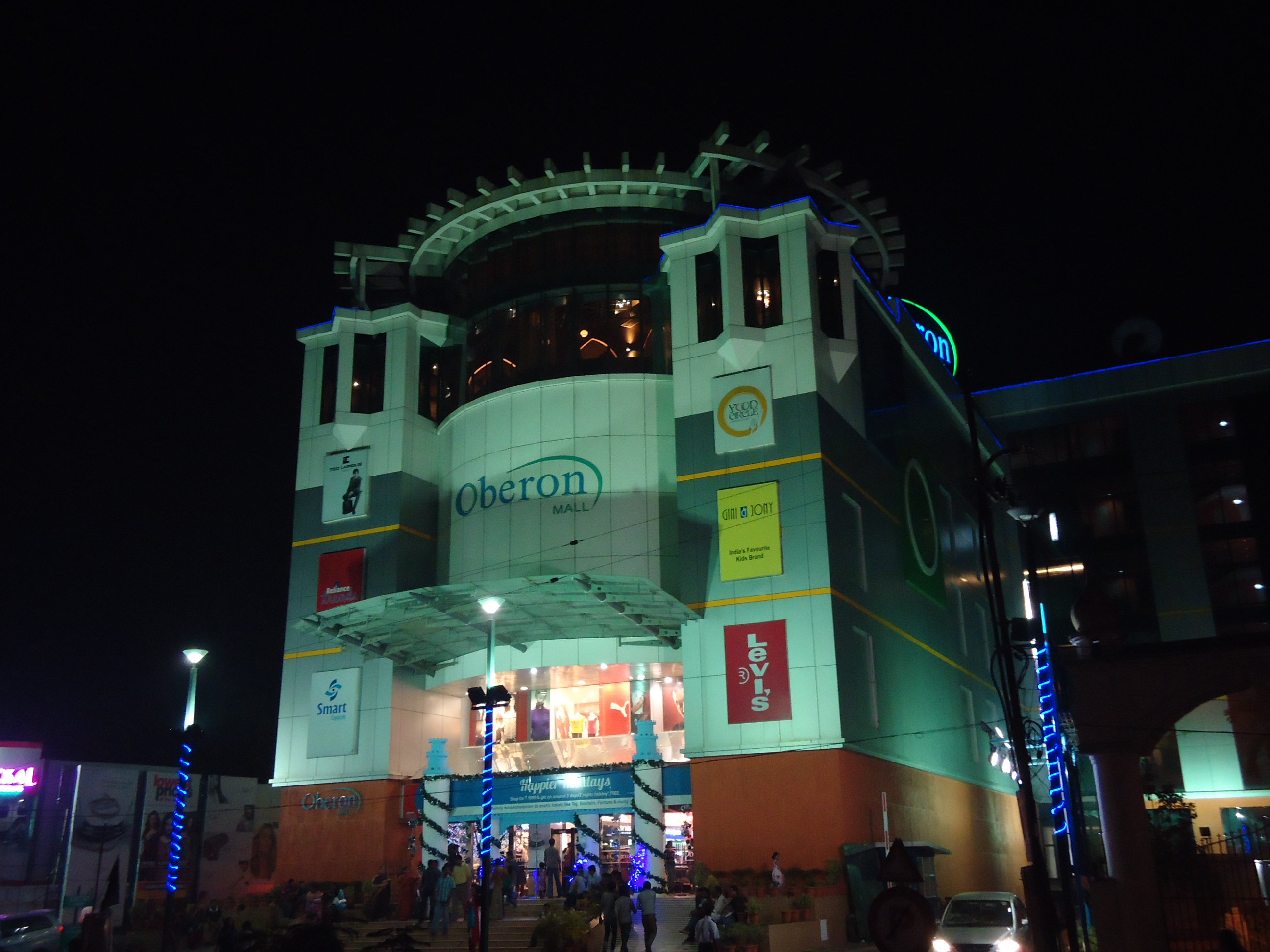
- Location: Kochi, India
- Coordinates: 10°0′52″N 76°18′44″E
- Address: NH 544 Bypass, Edapally
- Opened: 2008
- Developer: Oberon Group of Companies, Flora Group of Dubai
- Architect: A.K. Prasanth
- Num. of anchor tenants: 6 Reliance Retail
- Floor area: 350,000 square feet (33,000 m^{2})
- Floors: 2 Basements+GF+4
- Parking: 1200
- Website: Oberon Mall

Oberon Mall is a shopping mall located in the Indian city of Kochi. The mall was opened formally on 2 March 2009, though it was launched in 2008. The cost of construction of the mall is about ₹1 billion. It is built on an area of 350,000 square feet (33,000 m^{2}) across five floors of shops. It also has office spaces and covers grounds of up to 6 acres (2.4 ha).

Oberon Mall was developed and promoted by the Oberon Group of Companies, India.

Wild Fish, a world-class seafood store from Abad Food Services which offers live, fresh and frozen seafood, opened their store in Oberon Mall. A fire broke out at Oberon Mall in May 2017 but no severe damage was reported.

A renovation of the mall was completed in December 2024.

== Shopping ==
Shops at the mall include Reliance Trends, Smart Bazaar, Trends Footwear, Reliance Digital, Basics, Peter England, Navigator, Scullers, Style Play, Funskool, American Tourister, Twin Birds, Woodlands and Vismay.

== Entertainment ==
PVR Cinemas is the primary entertainment and family leisure activity offered by the mall.
