= Mister Nigeria =

National male beauty pageant competition in Nigeria

- Type: Male Beauty Pageant
- Headquarters: Lagos, Nigeria
- First edition: 2007; 19 years ago
- Most recent edition: 2025
- Current titleholder: Michael Mazi; Lagos
- Language: English

Mister Nigeria is a male pageant which selects contestants to compete at Mister World. Although ran by several organisers in previous decades, the current franchise holder is Silverbird Group who also organise Most Beautiful Girl in Nigeria.

The criteria for the competition includes Nigerian citizenship and at least a WAEC certificate, with the age limit being 18–25. Catwalk experience is also preferred, but not necessary. Prizes for the winner vary each year, but have always included cash; as of 2014, it stands at N1,000,000, and some winners have also received a car.

While Mr Nigeria is not as popular or consistent as MBGN, representatives from the Silverbird version have performed notably better than their female counterparts at international level, with three of its four winners placing at Mister World. Its biggest achievement to date was in 2014 when Emmanuel Ikubese emerged first runner-up at Mister World 2014 behind Danish carpenter Nicklas Pedersen.

== Title holders (Silverbird edition) ==
=== Color keys ===
- : Declared as Winner
- : Ended as runner-up or Top 5/6 qualification
- : Ended as one of the Finalists
- : Ended as one of the Semi-finalists
- : Ended as special awards winner

Year	Representative	State	International Pageant	Placement	Special Awards	Ref.
2026	Chris Chidubem	Onitsha	Mister Supranational 2026	Top 10		
2024	Michael Mazi	Lagos	Mister Supranational 2025	3rd Runner-up	Supra Fan-Vote	
2024	Michael Mazi	Lagos	Mister World 2024	Did not compete		
2019	Prince Nelson Enwerem	Cross River	Mister World 2019	Top 29		
2016	Michael Amilo	Anambra	Mister World 2016	Unplaced		
2014	Emmanuel Ifeanyi Ikubese	Lagos	Mister World 2014	1st Runner-Up	Fashion & Style	
2012	Deji Bakare	Abuja	Mister World 2012	Did not compete		
2010	Kenneth Obinna Okolie	Lagos	Mister World 2010	2nd Runner-Up		
2007	Ikenna Bryan Okwara	Imo	Mister World 2007	Top 12		

== See also ==
- Misters of Nigeria
