= MVJ =

MVJ may refer to:

- VJ (media personality), a music or mobile video jockey
- MVJ College of Engineering, an engineering college in Bangalore, India
- Marikina Verdiamonds Jewellers, a Filipino basketball team
- Marlboro Airport (Jamaica)
- Mavli Junction railway station, Rajasthan, India
