= Prathamesh Maulingkar =

Indian footballer and male beauty pageant titleholder

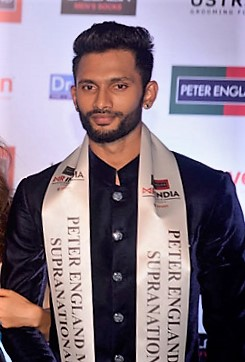
- Maulingkar after winning Mr. India Supranational at Mr India 2017.
- Born: 4 April 1991 (age 35); Tivim, Goa, India
- Occupations: Model, Football player
- Height: 1.91 m (6 ft 3 in)
- Beauty pageant titleholder
- Title: Mister India Supranational 2017; Mister Supranational 2018
- Years active: 2010–present
- Major competitions: Mr India 2017 (Winner – Mister Supranational India); Mister Supranational 2018 (Winner)

Prathamesh Maulingkar
Personal information
- Height: 1.91 m (6 ft 3 in)
- Position: Centre back

Team information
- Current team: Dempo
- Number: 30

Senior career*
Years	Team	Apps	(Gls)
2011–2013	Pailan Arrows	15	(2)
2013–2014	Dempo	1	(0)

International career
2012–	India U23	3	(0)
- * Club domestic league appearances and goals

Prathamesh Maulingkar (born 4 April 1991) is an Indian model and former footballer. He won the title of Mister Supranational in 2018. He had played as a centre back for Dempo in the I-League. Maulingkar is the first footballer in Asia to be featured on the cover of Men's Health magazine. He also works as a fitness trainer and owns a gym in Goa.

== Football ==
=== Youth career ===
Maulingkar hails from Tivim, a village near the Northern Goan town of Mapusa, Prathamesh had ambitions of being a cricketer. He showed the qualities of a footballer only in the teen years and made it to the Dempo U-16 team. He represented the state of Goa in the U-19 junior nationals. Playing against boys of same age group from other states, he realized that he has the potential to play along with the best in the country. Since then, he had focused only on his career in football. During this time he remained in Dempo youth team, represented them at U-19 level. He was also called up for India U-19 camp.

=== Pailan Arrows ===
Maulingkar made his Pailan Arrows debut on 6 November 2011 against Dempo in the I-League. Maulingkar scored his first goal of the 2012–13 season against Churchill Brothers on 9 January 2013 at the Duler Stadium in which Pailan Arrows lost the match 3–1.

=== Dempo ===
On 18 January 2013 it was confirmed that Maulingkar had signed for reigning champions Dempo of the I-League on loan for the rest of the season with the option to sign him permanently at the end of the season. He then made his debut for the club on 28 March 2013 against Pune in which he started and played for one full half before being subbed-off at half-time as Dempo went on to lose the match 2–0.

== Pageants and television shows ==
In 2015, Prathamesh participated in MTv Splitsvilla Season 8 hosted by Rannvijay Singh and Sunny Leone, which aired on MTV channel.

He participated in the 9th edition of Mister India contest. On the final gala held on 14 December 2017 in Mumbai, he won the title of Peter England Mr. India Supranational 2018. He represented India at the Mister Supranational 2018 pageant in Krynica-Zdrój, Poland where he was declared as the winner. He also won the Best Body award in the competition. Prathamesh is the first Asian to win the title of Mister Supranational.

== International ==
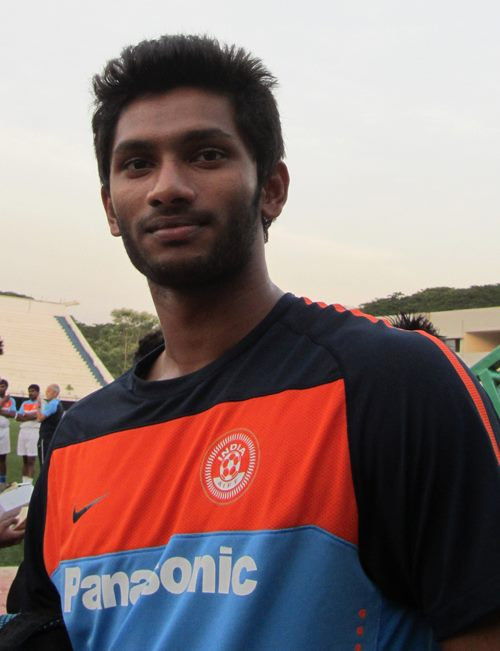

Maulingkar made his India U23 debut against Iraq U23 on 25 June 2012 during qualification for the 2013 AFC U-22 Asian Cup playing the full 90 minutes but drawing a yellow card in the 14th minute.

== Television ==
Year	Name	Role
2015	MTV Splitsvilla 8	Contestant

== Career statistics ==
=== Club ===
Statistics accurate as of 12 May 2013

Club	Season	League		Federation Cup		Durand Cup		AFC		Total	
Club	Season	Apps	Goals	Apps	Goals	Apps	Goals	Apps	Goals	Apps	Goals
Pailan Arrows	2011–12	6	1	0	0	0	0	—	—	6	1
Pailan Arrows	2012–13	9	1	1	0	1	0	—	—	11	1
Dempo (loan)	2012–13	1	0	0	0	0	0	—	—	1	0
Career total		16	2	1	0	1	0	0	0	18	2

Awards and achievements
Preceded by (Venezuela) Gabriel Correa	Mister Supranational; 2018	Succeeded by (United States) Nate Crnkovich
Preceded by Altamash Faraz	Mister India Supranational; 2017	Succeeded by Varun Verma
