= Enwerem =

Enwerem is a surname. Notable people with the surname include:

- Evan Enwerem, Nigerian politician
- Nelson Enwerem, Nigerian actor, TV host, and model
