= Mister Supranational 2024 =

8th Mister Supranational beauty pageant

- Date: 4 July 2024
- Presenters: Aleksander Sikora; Katarzyna Kołeczek; Nico Panagio
- Venue: Strzelecki Park Amphitheater, Nowy Sącz, Lesser Poland, Poland
- Broadcaster: Polsat; YouTube
- Entrants: 36
- Placements: 20
- Debuts: Côte d'Ivoire; Guatemala
- Withdrawals: Belgium; Cambodia; Cameroon; Cuba; Equatorial Guinea; France; Greece; Italy; Namibia; Panama; Zimbabwe
- Returns: Colombia; Dominican Republic; Germany; Haiti; Jamaica; Laos; Malta; Myanmar; Paraguay; Sierra Leone; Vietnam
- Winner: Fezile Mkhize; South Africa
- Congeniality: Alan Hierro; United States

Mister Supranational 2024 was the eighth edition of the Mister Supranational pageant held in Nowy Sącz, Lesser Poland, Poland on 4 July 2024. It was won by Fezile Mkhize of South Africa, making South Africa the first African nation to win, and with the first black winner of the title.

== Background ==
=== Selection of participants ===
Contestants from 36 countries and territories were selected to compete for the 2024 edition.

==== Debuts, returns and withdrawals ====
The 2024 pageant had the debut of Côte d'Ivoire and Guatemala. The following countries returned after a hiatus: Colombia, Dominican Republic, Germany, Haiti, Laos, Malta, and Myanmar all of which last participated in 2022. Furthermore, Myanmar and Paraguay, absent since 2018, returned, along with Jamaica, who last participated in 2019, and Colombia and the Dominican Republic, who last participated in 2021.

The contestants were officially confirmed to be competing during The Sashing Ceremony, on a broadcast on the pageant's YouTube channel on June 26, 2024.

Belgium, Cameroon, Cuba, France, Italy, Namibia, Panama, and Zimbabwe withdrew after their respective organizations failed to appoint a delegate, hold a national competition, or lost their national franchise. Delegates from Cambodia, Equatorial Guinea, and Greece were no-shows in Poland; they had all taken part in Supra Chat 2024.

== Results ==
=== Placements ===
Placement	Contestant
Mister Supranational 2024	South Africa – Fezile Mkhize ∆
1st runner-up	Netherlands – Casey de Vries
2nd runner-up	Philippines – Brandon Espiritu ∆
3rd runner-up	Venezuela – Marcos De Freitas
4th runner-up	Laos – Sanonh Maniphonh
Top 10	Colombia – Rafael Rapelo ∆; Dominican Republic – Bray Vargas; Mexico – Zait Reza; Poland – Patryk Karbowski; Vietnam – Đỗ Quang Tuyển ★
Top 20	Brazil – Matheus Maia ‡; Czech Republic – Adam Sedro; Indonesia – Nathaniel Christopher; Nepal – Dhiroj Kaji Basnet; Peru – Joel Farach; Puerto Rico – Cristian González; Sierra Leone – Uthman Issa Bangura; Spain – Álvaro Germes; Thailand – Chonlawit Wongsriwor; Trinidad and Tobago – Anderson Subero

Note:

^∆ Automatically qualified for the top 20 finalists after winning fast-track challenges.

^★ Automatically qualified for the top 10 finalists after winning the "Supra Fan Vote".

^‡ Automatically qualified for the top 20 finalists chosen as "the Candidate's Choice" (chosen by fellow contestants).

=== Continental titleholders ===
The award was presented to representatives with the highest ranking within the continent, excluding those in the Top 5.

Continent	Contestant	Ref.
Africa	Sierra Leone – Uthman Issa Bangura	
Americas	Colombia – Rafael Rapelo	
Asia	Vietnam – Đỗ Quang Tuyển	
Caribbean	Dominican Republic – Bray Vargas	
Europe	Poland – Patryk Karbowski	

== Challenge events ==
=== Supra Chat ===
The Supra Chat with contestants was on May 27, 2024, and was broadcast on the official YouTube channel of Mister Supranational. During the event, contestants were grouped into clusters of four to six, where they individually presented themselves. There were seven groups, with the winners from each group advancing to the final round of the challenge.

- Advanced to the semi-finals

Group	Country or territory						Ref.
1	~~Cuba~~	Dominican Republic	Ecuador	Paraguay	Spain	Venezuela	
2	Czech Republic	Germany	Malta	Netherlands	Poland	Sierra Leone	
3	Côte d'Ivoire	~~France~~	~~Greece~~	Haiti	Indonesia	Philippines	
4	Canada	~~Equatorial Guinea~~	Myanmar	Nepal	South Africa	South Korea	
5	~~Cambodia~~	India	Jamaica	Malaysia	Slovakia	—N/a	
6	Argentina	Brazil	Colombia	Guatemala	Mexico	—N/a	
7	Laos	Peru	Puerto Rico	Thailand	Trinidad and Tobago	United States	

Notes

- Cambodia withdrew with a no-show in the Supra Chat.
- Cuba withdrew from the competition.
- Equatorial Guinea withdrew with a no-show in Poland.
- France withdrew with a no-show in Poland.
- Greece withdrew with a no-show in Poland.
- Vietnam wasn't assigned to any group for the Supra Chat.

==== Final round ====
- Advanced to the Top 20 via Supra Chat

Results	Country	Ref.
Winner	South Africa – Fezile Mkhize	
Top 7	Indonesia – Nathaniel Christopher; Jamaica – Jermaine Harris; Mexico – Zait Reza; Netherlands – Casey De Vries; Thailand – Chonlawit Wongsriwor; Venezuela – Marcos De Freitas	

=== Mister Influencer Opportunity ===
In the selection process, two individuals were chosen as semifinalist winners via the Facebook competition, while the remaining candidates were selected through competitions on Instagram and YouTube. These individuals secured positions as part of the Top 8 semifinalists. The participant with the highest overall performance in the challenge automatically advanced to become one of the Top 20 semifinalists in the final round.

- Advanced to the Top 20 via Mister Influencer Opportunity

Results	Country	Ref.
Winner	Philippines – Brandon Espiritu	
Top 3	Brazil – Matheus Maia; Myanmar – Thet Oo Maung Maung	
Top 8	Argentina – Guillermo Layus; Malaysia – Siavesh Akbari; South Africa – Fezile Mkhize; Thailand – Chonlawit Wongsriwor; Vietnam – Đỗ Quang Tuyển	

=== Supra Fan-Vote ===
The Supra Fan-Vote event commenced on June 18, 2024, and concluded on the day of the finals. The recipient of the most votes in the Supra Fan Vote was directly promoted to the Top 10 of Mister Supranational 2024. The voting period occurred prior to the final evening and closed before the start of the finals. The definitive ranking of the leaderboard was disclosed on July 4, ahead of the finals night.

- Advanced to the Top 10 via Supra Fan-Vote.

Placement	Country	Ref.
Winner	Vietnam – Đỗ Quang Tuyển	
Top 10	Dominican Republic – Bray Vargas; Indonesia – Nathaniel Christopher; Laos – Sanonh Maniphonh; Mexico – Zait Reza; Myanmar – Thet Oo Maung Maung; Philippines – Brandon Espiritu; South Korea – Jo Seong Hyeon; Thailand – Chonlawit Wongsriwor; United States – Alan Hierro	

=== Supra Model of the Year ===
On June 29, 2024, the Supra Model of the Year contest was live-streamed on the official Miss Supranational YouTube channel at 6pm. During the finals, one of the three finalists was revealed as a semi-finalist in the finals.

- Advanced to the Top 20 via Supra Model of the Year

Placement	Contestant	Ref.
Winner	Colombia – Rafael Rapelo	
Top 3	Dominican Republic – Bray Vargas; Sierra Leone – Uthman Issa Bangura	
Top 11	Côte d’Ivoire – Firmin Junior Yapi; Haiti – Abdias Augustin; Laos – Sanonh Maniphonh; Peru – Joel Farach; Philippines – Brandon Espiritu; South Africa – Fezile Mkhize; South Korea – Jo Seong Hyeon; Venezuela – Marcos De Freitas	

=== Non-fast track events ===
==== Mister Talent ====
On June 25, ten talent entries were showcased on the official YouTube channel of Mister Supranational, and subsequent votes were cast. The Supra Talent Finals was streamed live on the Miss Supranational official YouTube channel at 9 pm on June 29, 2024.

Final results	Country	Ref.
Winner	Trinidad and Tobago – Anderson Subero	
Top 4	Canada – Jaime Cecar; Indonesia – Nathaniel Christopher; Mexico – Zait Reza	
Top 10	Argentina – Guillermo Layus; Brazil – Matheus Maia; Colombia – Rafael Rapelo; Haiti – Abdias Augustin; Jamaica – Jermaine Harris; Nepal – Dhiroj Kaji Basnet	

== Pageant ==
=== Presenters ===
On June 6, 2024, the President of the Miss Supranational Organization, Gerhard Parzutka von Lipinski, announced Nico Panagio as the host for the Miss and Mister Supranational 2024 Final Shows. Kasia Kołeczek will also be joining Panagio on the finals.

- Nico Panagio: South African actor, host of Survivor South Africa
- Kasia Kołeczek: Polish/British actress
- Aleksander Sikora: Polish presenter

=== Panel of experts ===
The Preliminary Competition was broadcast live on the official Mister Supranational YouTube channel at 6 pm CET on July 1, 2024.

- Andrea Aguilera – Miss Supranational 2023 from Ecuador
- Andre Sleigh – Creative director of Miss and Mister Supranational
- Iván Álvarez Guedes – Mister Supranational 2023 from Spain
- Katarzyna Krzeszowska – Miss Supranational 2014 fourth runner-up from Poland (only on the final broadcast)
- Keisha – Polish stylist and designer
- Louisa – Creative producer of Miss Supernational and Mister Supernational 2024 finals shows
- Nguyễn Huỳnh Kim Duyên – Miss Supranational 2022 second runner-up from Vietnam
- Rick Sotelo – Supranational stylist
- Robert Czepiel – General director of Jubiler Schubert / World of Amber

The final show was broadcast live on the official Mister Supranational YouTube channel at 8pm CET, on July 4, 2024.

== Contestants ==
Thirty-six contestants competed for the title:

Country/Territory	Contestant	Age (Note: Ages at the time of the pageant)	Hometown	Continental Group
Argentina	Guillermo Layus	28	San Miguel de Tucumán	Americas
Brazil	Matheus Maia	26	Cachoeirinha	Americas
Canada	Jaime Cesar	33	Toronto	Americas
Colombia	Rafael Rapelo	27	Santa Marta	Americas
Côte d'Ivoire	Firmin Junior Yapi	28	Yamoussoukro	Africa
Czech Republic	Adam Sedro	29	Prague	Europe
Dominican Republic	Bray Vargas	32	Santiago	Caribbean
Ecuador	Fernando Mendieta	33	Guayaquil	Americas
Germany	Marc Arthur Tsanang	34	Wiesbaden	Europe
Guatemala	Joshua Mata	32	Guatemala City	Americas
Haiti	Abdias Augustin	23	Cap-Haïtien	Caribbean
India	Aman Rajesh Singh	24	Bangalore	Asia
Indonesia	Nathaniel Christopher	20	Banten	Asia
Jamaica	Jermaine Harris	34	St. Catherine	Caribbean
Laos	Sanonh Maniphonh	26	Luang Prabang	Asia
Malta	Ruben Pulido	33	Msida	Europe
Malaysia	Siavesh Akbari	31	Kuala Lumpur	Asia
Mexico	Zait Reza	32	Saltillo	Americas
Myanmar	Thet Oo Maung Maung	25	Yangon	Asia
Nepal	Dhiroj Kaji Basnet	21	Bharatpur	Asia
Netherlands	Casey De Vries	28	Brielle	Europe
Paraguay	Osvaldo Orué	26	Asunción	Americas
Peru	Joel Farach	34	Callao	Americas
Philippines	Brandon Espiritu	29	Dededo	Asia
Poland	Patryk Karbowski	31	Augustów	Europe
Puerto Rico	Cristian González Pérez	21	San Juan	Caribbean
Sierra Leone	Uthman Issa Bangura	25	Freetown	Africa
Slovakia	Adam Palkovič	26	Bratislava	Europe
South Africa	Fezile Mkhize	33	Bloemfontein	Africa
South Korea	Jo Seong Hyeon	28	Seoul	Asia
Spain	Álvaro Germes	29	Huesca	Europe
Thailand	Chonlawit Wongsriwor	27	Khon Kaen	Asia
Trinidad and Tobago	Anderson Subero	25	Sangre Grande	Caribbean
United States	Alan Hierro	32	New York City	Americas
Venezuela	Marcos De Freitas	24	Caracas	Americas
Vietnam	Đỗ Quang Tuyển	24	Nam Định	Asia
