= MVJ College of Engineering =

VTU college in Karnataka, India

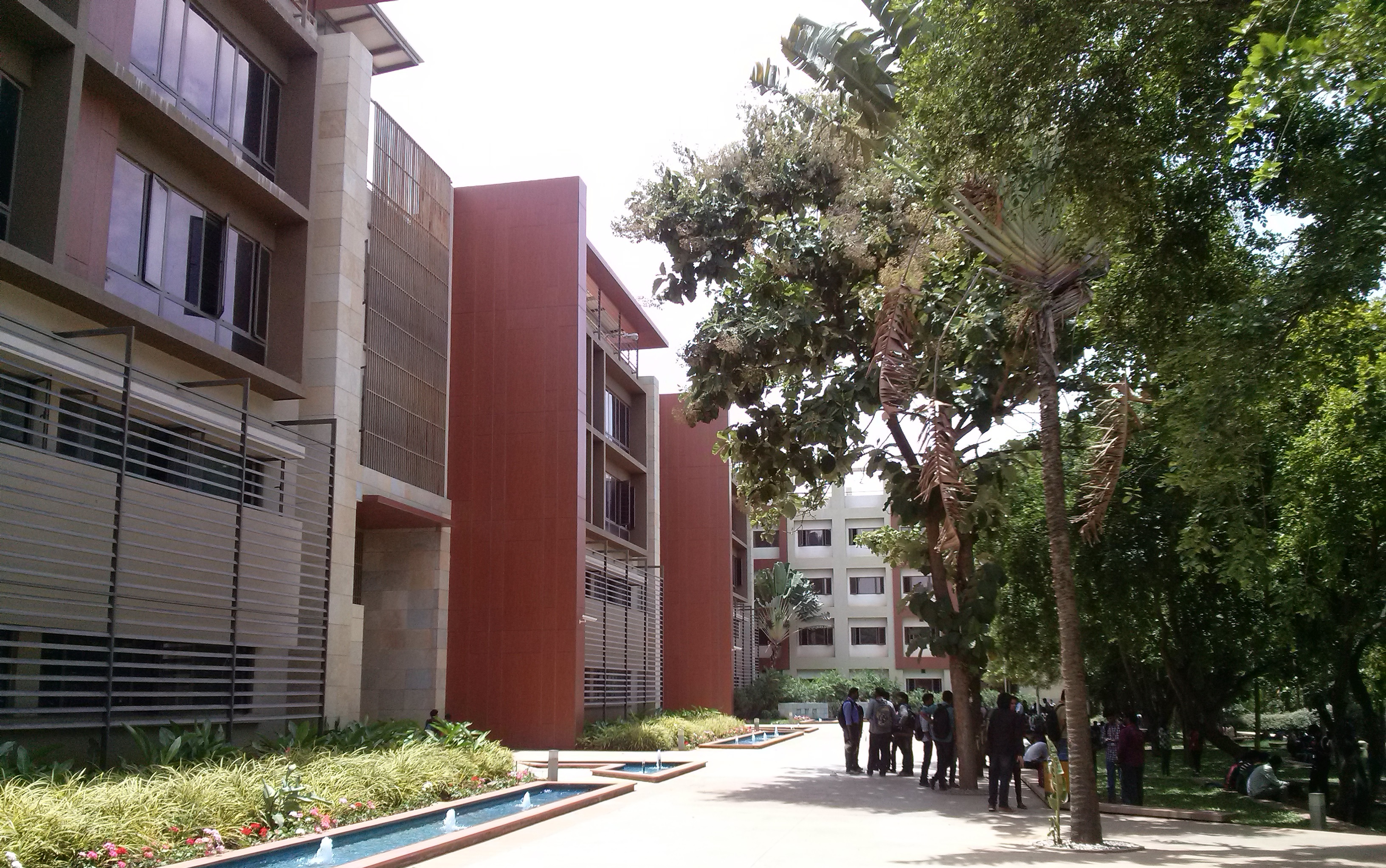
- Motto in English: Engineering A Better Tomorrow
- Type: Private
- Established: 1982
- Founder: M. V. Jayaraman
- Affiliations: VTU, UGC, AICTE, NBA, NAAC
- Chairman: M. J. Balachandar
- Principal: Dr. Ajayan K R
- Location: Bangalore, Karnataka, India
- Website: www.mvjce.edu.in
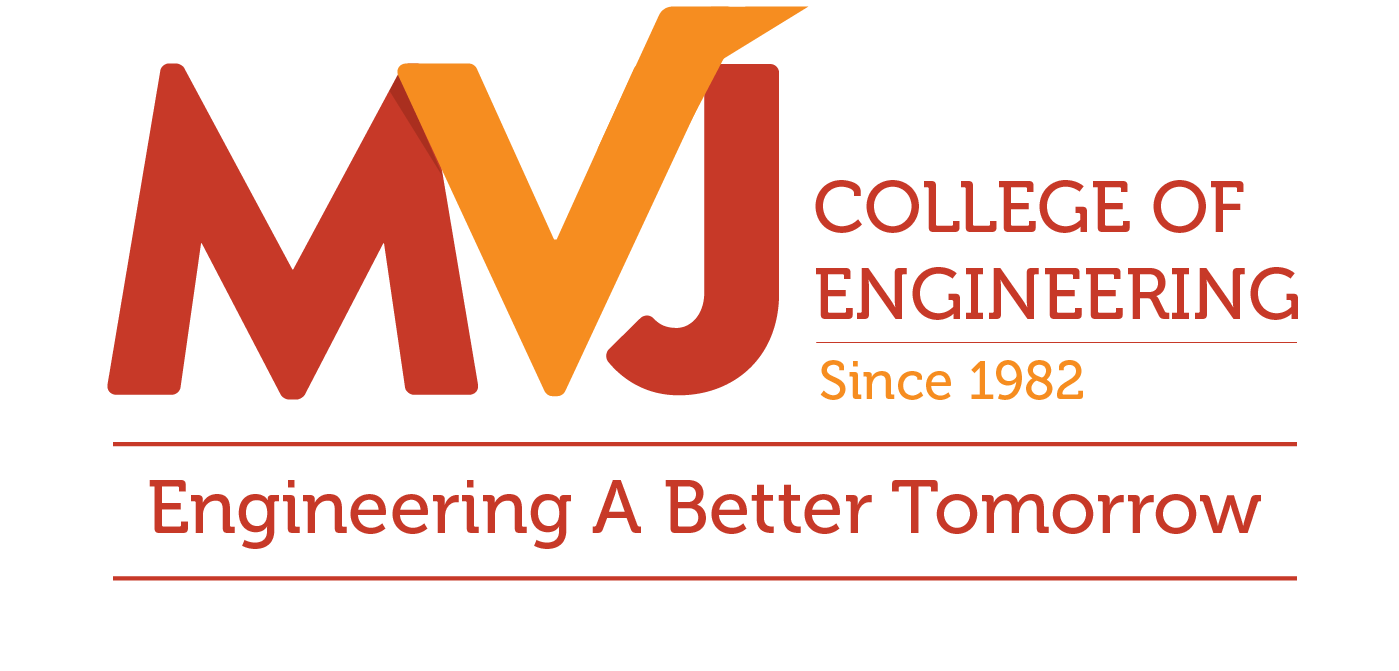

MVJ College of Engineering (MVJCE) is a private autonomous engineering college located in Bangalore, Karnataka, India. MVJCE is affiliated with Visvesvaraya Technological University (VTU). It was established in 1982 by Venkatesha Education Society. It is situated on a 15-acre campus in Whitefield, Bangalore.

== History ==
MVJ College of Engineering was established in 1982 under Bangalore University affiliation as a flagship institution of the Venkatesha Education Society by Dr. M. V. Jayaraman.

Initially, MVJCE started with undergraduate programs in four disciplines and a modest intake of 200 students. Over the years, the college has expanded its offerings and now provides 15 undergraduate programs, 8 postgraduate programs, and Ph.D. programs across various branches of engineering and management. The college is affiliated with Visvesvaraya Technological University (VTU) and is approved by the All India Council for Technical Education (AICTE).

== Campus ==
The MVJCE campus spans over a built-up area of 500,000 square feet. The college offers laboratories, classrooms, seminar halls, and video-conferencing and live media streaming facilities.

=== Library ===
The central library at MVJCE covers an area of 17,000 square feet and houses over 50,000 books and subscriptions to more than 120 national and international journals. The library also subscribes to over 200 e-journals through the INDEST-AICTE Consortium.

=== Hostels ===
MVJCE provides hostel facilities for both male and female students.

== Affiliation and accreditation ==
All the courses offered by MVJ College of Engineering are affiliated with Visvesvaraya Technological University (VTU), Belagavi & approved by the All India Council for Technical Education (AICTE).

Aeronautical Engineering, Chemical Engineering, Computer Science and Engineering, Electronics and Communication, Electrical and Electronics, Mechanical Engineering, and Information Science and Engineering programs offered by MVJ are accredited by the National Board of Accreditation (NBA), and the college is accredited by the National Assessment and Accreditation Council (NAAC).

Like all higher education institutes in India, MVJCE is recognized by the University Grants Commission (UGC). MVJCE is also approved by the All India Council for Technical Education (AICTE) and some courses are accredited by the National Board of Accreditation (NBA). It is also accredited by the National Assessment and Accreditation Council (NAAC) with a B++ Grade.

== Academics ==
Admission to most undergraduate and postgraduate courses in MVJCE is granted through written entrance examinations. The college offers a variety of programs, including B.Tech, M.Tech, MBA, and MCA.

=== Undergraduate Programs ===
Admission to undergraduate engineering programs (B.Tech) at MVJCE can be obtained through the Karnataka Common Entrance Test or the Consortium of Medical, Engineering and Dental Colleges of Karnataka (COMEDK) entrance examination. Students must have passed the II PUC/12th Standard or equivalent examination with English as one of the languages and obtained a minimum of 45% marks in aggregate in Physics and Mathematics, along with Chemistry/Bio-Technology/Biology/Electronics/Computer Science. For SC/ST and OBC (Cat-1, 2A, 2B, 3A, and 3B category) students from Karnataka, the minimum marks for eligibility shall be 40%.

=== Postgraduate Programs ===
Admission to postgraduate programs (M.Tech) is primarily granted through the Karnataka Postgraduate Common Entrance Test (PGCET) or the Graduate Aptitude Test in Engineering (GATE). For MBA programs, admission is based on valid scores from the Common Management Admission Test (CMAT) or the Karnataka PGCET.

== Departments and courses ==
MVJ College of Engineering offers 15 undergraduate programmes and 7 postgraduate programmes across various branches of Engineering.

=== Undergraduate ===
The following four-year undergraduate programs are offered:

1. Aeronautical Engineering
2. Aerospace Engineering
3. Chemical Engineering
4. Civil Engineering
5. Computer Science and Engineering
6. Computer Science and Design
7. Electronics and Communication Engineering
8. Electrical and Electronics Engineering
9. Information Science Engineering
10. Computer Science and Engineering (Data Science)
11. Artificial Intelligence & Machine Learning
12. Mechanical Engineering
13. Industrial IOT
14. Electronics Engineering ( VLSI Design and Technology)
15. Electronics and Communication (Advanced Communication Technology)

=== Postgraduate ===
The following two-year postgraduate programs are offered:

1. Aeronautical Engineering
2. Artificial Intelligence & Data Science
3. Computer Science and Engineering
4. Structural Engineering
5. Civil Engineering (Transportation Engineering)
6. Electronics Engineering (VLSI Design and Technology)
7. Electronics and Communication (Advanced Communication Technology)

Master's in Business Administration with dual specialization in HR/Finance/Marketing is also offered by MVJCE.

=== Research Centres ===
1. Department of Computer Science & Engineering
2. Civil Engineering
3. Electronics and Communication Engineering
4. Electrical and Electronics Engineering
5. Mechanical Engineering
6. Chemistry
7. Physics
8. Mathematics
9. Aeronautical Engineering

Above Courses are recognized as Research Centres by VTU to pursue Doctoral Programme.

== Board Of Governors ==
- M. J. Balachandar, chairman, MVJCE, Bangalore
- Venkatesh Apparay Raikar, former vice chancellor, Sanjay Ghodawat University
- Bhimaraya Metri, director, IIM, Nagpur
- Satish Vasu Kailas, professor, Dept. of Mechanical Engg., IISc., Bangalore
- R. Jagadeesh, former dean academics, SDMIMD, Mysore
- Krishna Venkatesh, director, CIIRC, SIRO (DSIR), Bangalore
- N. Alagumurthi, professor, Mechanical Engineering, Pondicherry Technological University
- Ajayan K R, principal, MVJCE, Bangalore
- M Brindha, dean-administration, MVJCE, Bangalore

== Student activities ==
MVJCE hosts three annual festivals, a technical fest called VertechX, a cultural fest called SWAYAM and Innovation Day.

== Rankings ==
- 61 among top private engineering colleges in India, The Outlook Magazine, 2020
- 28 among top private engineering colleges in India, India Today, 2020
- 37 among top private engineering colleges in India, The Week, 2020

== Research and projects ==
Research projects and contributions by MVJCE student:

Gold and Metal Extraction from Printed Circuit Boards (PCBs): Students of MVJCE has developed an environmentally friendly method to extract gold and other metals from the printed circuit boards of old mobile phones.

Yoga Pose Tracking System: students from the college developed a yoga pose tracking system designed to assist beginners in performing yoga correctly. This system uses advanced technology to provide real-time feedback, ensuring that users can learn and practice yoga in an accurate and safe manner.

Smart Braille Technology: MVJCE researchers worked on developing smart Braille systems that aim to enhance the reading experience for visually impaired individuals.

== Awards ==
MVJ College of Engineering has bagged the First Prize in the National Aerospace Conceptual Design Competition (NACDeC-IV). The college beat top institutions like IIT Bombay, BMS College of Engineering, Sastra University and Manipal Institute of Technology, to take home the prestigious prize. The MVJ team, named Abhimanyu 4.0, was awarded a cash prize of Rs 20,000 and certificates, for their excellent work. The competition was organised by Design Division and Mumbai Branch of The Aeronautical Society of India.

== Notable alumni ==
- Vishnu Raj Menon, Mr India 2016 and Indian model

== See also ==
- RV University, Bengaluru
- Visvesvaraya Technological University
- National Institute of Technology Karnataka, Surathkal
- Delhi Technological University
- Indian Institutes of Technology
- R.V. College of Engineering
