= Mister South Africa =

Beauty contest

- Formation: 1988; 38 years ago
- Type: Male Beauty pageant
- Headquarters: Johannesburg
- Location: South Africa
- Members: Mister World; Manhunt International; Mister International; Mister Supranational; Mister Global
- Official language: English
- President: JP Robberts
- Website: www.mrsa.co.za

Mister South Africa is a South African beauty pageant that selects representatives to compete in international men's beauty pageants.

== History ==
The contest welcomes South African men of all backgrounds. The Mister South Africa brand annually searches the nation for the next deserving titleholder to serve as a positive male role model to younger generations. Through the pageant, the finalists are provided opportunities to further their careers and promote causes.

The first official contestant on Mister South Africa was Shane Ford in 1994. Ford participated in Australia for the Manhunt International pageant.

Contestants have represented South Africa in major men's international beauty pageants, including Manhunt International, Mister World, Mister Supranational and Mister Global.

JP Robberts, the CEO of Mr South Africa, has been appointed as the new National Director for Mr Supranational South Africa. Since 2025 the winner of Mister South Africa will be competing in Mister Supranational.

== International Titles ==
- One – Manhunt International winners:
  - Albe Geldenhuys (1995)
- One – Mister Supranational winner:
  - Fezile Mkhize (2024)

== Titleholders ==
Mister South Africa
| 1988 | Dale Stevens | 1992 | Cliff Simon | 1993 | Glen Fisher | 1994 | Paul Phume | 1995 | Charl Hector Coode |
| 1996 | Michael Mol | 1997 | Sam Phororo | 1998 | John Berry | 2000 | Nicholas Volsteedt | 2001 | Andrew Prince |
| 2005 | Ryno van Wyk | 2006 | Marcus Muller | 2007 | Dieter Voigt | 2008 | Zino Ventura | 2009 | Stephen Segal |
| 2010 | Denver Burns | 2011 | Adriaan Bergh | 2012 | Andrew Govender | 2013 | John Owens | 2015 | Armand du Plessis |
| 2017 | Habib Noorbhai | 2019 | Heinrich Gabler | 2020 | Hannes Van Der Walt | 2021 | Ntando Lurwengu | 2022 | Fuad Williams |
| 2023 | Tiaan Massyn | 2024 | Marcel Roux | 2025 | JP Geldenhuys | | | | |

== International Placements ==
=== List of Mister South Africa at International pageants ===
Color key

- : Declared as Winner
- : Ended as runner-up
- : Ended as one of the finalists or semifinalists

| Year | Manhunt International | Mister World | Mister International | Mister Global | Mister Supranational |
|---|---|---|---|---|---|
| 1994 | Shane Ford | | | | |
| 1995 | Albe Geldenhuys (WINNER) (Vitality Award) (Sun Smart Award) | | | | |
| 1997 | Carlos Reis | | | | |
| 1998 | Joseph Urli | | | | |
| 1999 | Llewellyn Cordier (1st Runner-up) | | | | |
| 2000 | Paul Carlisle | | | | |
| 2001 | Mark Blair | | | | |
| 2002 | Jorge Maia (Top 15) | | | | |
| 2005 | William Roos | | | | |
| 2006 | Heimar Beukes | | | | |
| 2007 | Quinten van der Walt | Dieter Voigt (Top 12) | | | |
| 2008 | Christopher Lee | | | | |
| 2010 | Jacques Fagan (Top 16) | Jaco de Bruyn | | | |
| 2011 | Ryno Swanepoel (Top 15) | | Çhristo du Plessis | | |
| 2012 | Armand du Plessis | Andrew Govender | Daniel Wessels | | |
| 2014 | | Matthew Cole Fincham | | | |
| 2016 | | Armand du Plessis | | | |
| 2017 | Dylan Keeve van Niekerk (Top 15) (Best Africa Model) | | Dwayne Geldenhuis (2nd Runner-up) | Gerrie Havenga (1st Runner-up) (Best Physique) | |
| 2018 | Mawande Qeqe | | Lebogang Rameetse | Dwayne Geldenhuis (3rd Runner-up) | |
| 2019 | Heinrich Gabler | Fezile Mkhize (1st Runner-up) (Mister World Africa) | | Marcus Max Karsten | Rushil Jina (Top 10) (Supra Fan Vote) |
| 2021 | | | | Ruan Scheepers | Akshar Birbal |
| 2022 | Marcus Max Karsten (Top 10) | | | Pierre Nel (Top 15) | |
| 2023 | | | | Jonathan Lambert (Top 10) | Tylo Ribeiro (Top 20) |
| 2024 | Luke Van Greuning (10th Runner-up) | Samuel Chauke | S.J Pretorius | Anton Siebert (Top 20) | Fezile Mkhize (WINNER) (Mister Supra Chat) |
| 2025 | Jordan Petersen (Top 20) | | Tshiamo Malatsi | Charl-Jaquairdo (Top 20) | Luca Pontiggia (Top 20) |
| 2026 | Jonathan Lambert (Top 20) | TBA | Malwanduthando Khumalo (Top 20) | TBA | Marcél Roux (1st Runner-up) |

== See also ==
- Miss South Africa
- Miss Earth South Africa
- Miss Grand South Africa
- List of beauty pageants § Men's pageants
