= Fezile Mkhize =

South African actor and doctor

Fezile Thanda Mkhize
- Born: Fezile Thanda Mkhize; 8 March 1991 (age 35); KwaZulu-Natal, South Africa
- Education: University of Cape Town
- Occupations: Actor; doctor; model; tv presenter
- Height: 1.83 m (6 ft 0 in)
- Beauty pageant titleholder
- Title: Mister Supranational 2024; Mister World Africa 2019
- Years active: 2019–present
- Major competitions: Mister World 2019 (1st Runner-up) (Mister World Africa); Mister Supranational South Africa 2024 (Winner); Mister Supranational 2024 (Winner)

Fezile Thanda Mkhize (born 8 March 1991) is a South African actor, doctor, model, TV host and beauty pageant titleholder who was crowned Mister Supranational 2024 on July 4, 2024 in Poland. He became the first South African, the first African and consequently the first Black winner of the Mister Supranational pageant. He was previously crowned as the first runner-up at the Mister World 2019 pageant, held on August 23, 2019, in the Philippines where he also won the continental title of Mister World Africa 2019.

== Early life ==
Fezile, the second of three children, was born in Oslo Beach, a town on the south coast of KwaZulu-Natal. He grew up in a small township called Gamalakhe after his father died when Fezile was four years old. His mother, MaShusha Mkhize, a teacher, raised him and his two siblings.

Fezile graduated with a medical degree from the University of Cape Town in 2014. He later specialized in cardiothoracic surgery and currently practices at the Charlotte Maxeke Johannesburg Academic Hospital in Johannesburg.

== Career ==
He is known as an actor known for his roles in the South African romantic comedy television series Yoh! Christmas, which premiered on Netflix, Adulting which premiered on Showmax and the soap opera Generations: The Legacy.

== Pageantry ==
=== Mister World 2019 ===
Fezile competed at the Mister World 2019 pageant, held on August 23, 2019, at the Smart Araneta Coliseum in Quezon City, Metro Manila, Philippines. Representing South Africa, he faced off against 71 other contestants. During the competition, Fezile excelled in the Sports Challenge, winning the event. He also advanced to the Top 25 in the Top Model Challenge. At the end of the event, Fezile finished as the first runner-up to Jack Heslewood from England. However, he achieved the title of Mister World Africa 2019.

=== Mister Supranational 2024 ===
In 2024, Fezile Mkhize represented South Africa at the 8th edition of the Mister Supranational pageant, held in Poland on July 4 with 35 other contestants. He emerged victorious, winning the title of Mister Supranational 2024.

Fezile advanced to the first cut, the Top 20 of the competition by winning the Supra Chat fast-track event. He also placed at the Top 11 of the Supra Model of the Year event.

His victory marked a series of historic achievements. Fezile became the first African, the first South African, and the first Black winner of not only Mister Supranational but also any major international male beauty pageant. Additionally, South Africa's win solidified its position as the second nation, following India, to claim titles in both the Miss and Mister Supranational pageants.

Awards and achievements
Preceded by (Spain) Iván Álvarez Guedes	Mister Supranational; 2024	Succeeded by (France) Lavigne Swann
Preceded by Tylo Ribeiro	Mister Supranational South Africa; 2024	Succeeded by Luca Pontiggia
Preceded by (Puerto Rico) Fernando Alvarez	Mister World 1st Runner-up; 2019	Succeeded by (Vietnam) Phạm Tuấn Ngọc
Preceded by Armand du Plessis	Mister World South Africa; 2019	Succeeded by Samuel Chauke
