= Mister World 2019 =

10th Mister World competition, international male beauty pageant edition

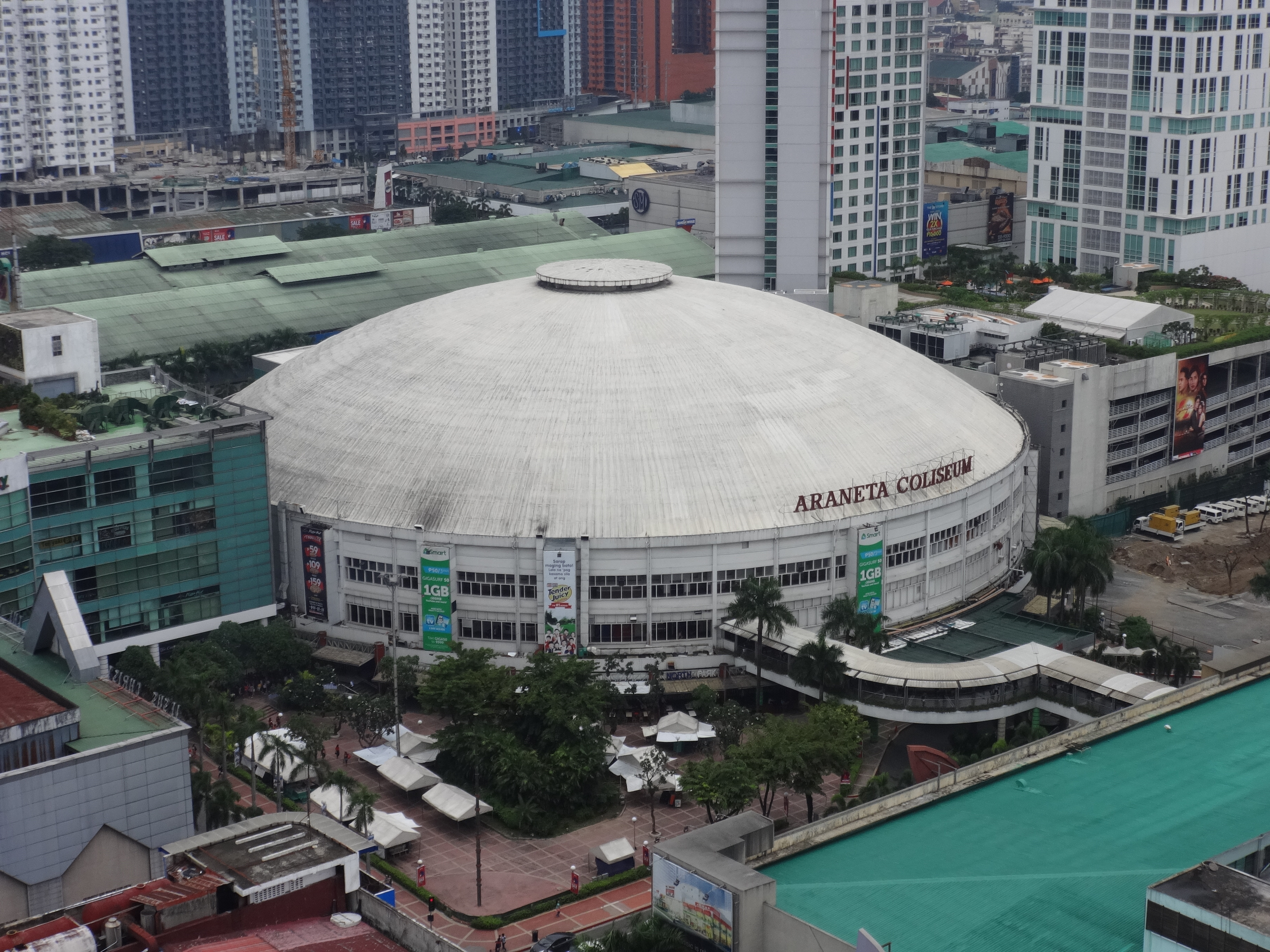
- Smart Araneta Coliseum, venue for Mister World 2019.
- Date: 23 August 2019
- Presenters: Megan Young; Mikael Daez; Katarina Rodriguez; Frankie Cena
- Venue: Smart Araneta Coliseum, Quezon City, Philippines
- Broadcaster: GMA Network; Sky Cable
- Entrants: 72
- Placements: 29
- Debuts: Armenia; Bangladesh; Cambodia; Cameroon; Ecuador; Equatorial Guinea; Finland; Kyrgyzstan; Mauritius; Myanmar; Samoa; Sierra Leone; Sint Maarten; South Sudan; Tonga
- Withdrawals: Bolivia; Denmark; France; Germany; Moldova; Romania; Scotland; Sweden; Switzerland; Wales
- Returns: Angola; Australia; Bosnia and Herzegovina; Chile; Colombia; Czech Republic; Dominican Republic; Estonia; Indonesia; Kazakhstan; Latvia; Lebanon; Luxembourg; Montenegro; Netherlands; Paraguay; Russia; Serbia; Singapore; Thailand; Venezuela
- Winner: Jack Heslewood; England

Mister World 2019 was the tenth edition of the Mister World competition. It was held on 23 August 2019 at the Smart Araneta Coliseum in Quezon City, Metro Manila, Philippines. Rohit Khandelwal of India crowned Jack Heslewood of England as his successor at the end of the event.

== Results ==
=== Placements ===
Placement	Contestant
Mister World 2019	England – Jack Heslewood
1st Runner-Up	South Africa – Fezile Mkhize
2nd Runner-Up	Mexico – Brian Faugier
Top 5	Brazil – Carlos Franco; Dominican Republic – Alejandro Martínez
Top 12	Austria – Alberto Nodale; Ireland - Wayne Walsh; Lebanon – Jean-Paul Bitar; Nepal – Akshay Rayamajhi; Northern Ireland – Adam Stensson; Philippines – Jody Tejano Saliba; Tonga – Mikaele Ahomana
Top 29	Argentina – Leonardo Díaz; Chile – Felipe Rojas; China – Zhang Zhiyu; Czech Republic – Jakub Krauś; Ghana – Bright Ofori; Indonesia – Radityo Senoputro; Italy – Marco D'Elia; Kenya – Robert Cula Budi; Latvia – Edvīns Ločmelis; Mauritius – Alexandre Curpanen; Netherlands – Ashley Peternella; Nigeria – Nelson Enwerem; Poland – Robert Kapica; Puerto Rico – José Cotto; Russia – Denis Khadyko; United States – Andresito Germosen; Venezuela – Jorge Núñez

Order of Announcements

Top 29

1. Argentina
2. Brazil
3. Chile
4. Dominican Republic
5. Mexico
6. Puerto Rico
7. United States
8. Venezuela
9. Ghana
10. Kenya
11. Mauritius
12. Nigeria
13. South Africa
14. Austria
15. Czech Republic
16. England
17. Ireland
18. Italy
19. Latvia
20. Netherlands
21. Northern Ireland
22. Poland
23. Russia
24. China
25. Indonesia
26. Lebanon
27. Nepal
28. Philippines
29. Tonga

Top 12

1. South Africa
2. Ireland
3. Tonga
4. Mexico
5. Nepal
6. Brazil
7. Dominican Republic
8. Austria
9. England
10. Northern Ireland
11. Philippines
12. Lebanon

Top 5

1. Brazil
2. Dominican Republic
3. England
4. Mexico
5. South Africa

=== Continental Zone Winners ===
Continent	Contestant
Africa	South Africa – Fezile Mkhize
Americas	Mexico – Brian Faugier
Asia Pacific	Philippines – Jody Tejano Saliba
Caribbean	Dominican Republic – Alejandro Martínez
Europe	Austria – Alberto Nodale

=== Special awards ===
Award	Contestant
Mr Photogenic	Mexico – Brian Faugier
Best in Barong Tagalog	England – Jack Heslewood

=== Challenge Events ===
- Extreme is a test of strength, endurance, and determination
- Sports is a test of skill, discipline, and athleticism
- Talent & Creativity focuses on the contestants' performing arts presentation, technique, and dedication
- Fashion looks at the contestants' runway skills, style and bearing, and overall fashion sense
- Multimedia looks at contestants' interaction with the online audience mainly on different social media platforms

=== Fast Track Events ===
Final results	Country	Contestant
Sports Challenge	South Africa	Fezile Mkhize
Extreme Challenge	Ireland	Wayne Walsh
Talent & Creativity	Tonga	Mikaele Ahomana
Top Model	Mexico	Brian Faugier
Multimedia Challenge	Nepal	Akshay Rayamajhi

=== Sports ===
Final result	Contestants
Winner	South Africa – Fezile Mkhize
1st Runner-Up	Colombia – Daniel Castrillon
2nd Runner-Up	Ireland – Wayne Walsh
3rd Runner-Up	Kenya – Robert Cula Budi
Swimming	Argentina – Leonardo Díaz
Basketball	England – Jack Heslewood
Shuttlerun	Peru – Jano Carper

Team	Red Team	Green Team	Yellow Team	Blue Team
Contestants	(Austria) Alberto Nodale; (Cameroon) Makala Nganda; (Canada) Alessandro Coward; (Chile) Felipe Rojas; (Colombia) Daniel Castrillón; (Curaçao) Naim Pieter	(Czech Republic) Jakub Krauś; (El Salvador) David Pivaral; (England) Jack Heslewood; (Equatorial Guinea) Joselayt Miko; (Guadeloupe) Luigy Manyri; (Republic of Ireland) Wayne Walsh	(Kenya) Robert Cula; (Luxembourg) Owen Hawel; (Mauritius) Alexandre Curpanen; (Netherlands) Ashley Peternella; (Paraguay) Alberto Silva; (Peru) Jano Carper	(Sint Maarten) Learie Hall; (South Africa) Fezile Mkhize; (Spain) Daniel Torres; (Thailand) Anakin Nontiprasit; (Tonga) Mikaele Ahomana; (Venezuela) Jorge Núñez
Reserve	(Armenia) Grigor Vardanyan; (Bangladesh) Mahadi Fahim	(Ecuador) Daniel Vallejo; (Finland) Tino Kantonen	(Malta) Daryl Azzopardi; (Nigeria) Nelson Enwerem	(Sri Lanka) Manoj de Silva; (United States) Andresito Germosen
Swimmers	(Argentina) Leonardo Díaz; (Australia) Jonathan Berry	(Greece) Thomas Tzekos; (Japan) Kenta Nagai	(Nicaragua) José Vallejos; (Panama) Algis González	(Philippines) Jody Tejano; (Poland) Robert Kapica
Others	(Angola) Pascoal André; (Bosnia and Herzegovina) Darko Milović; (Brazil) Carlos Franco; (Bulgaria) Oliver Staykov; (Cambodia) Somkhan Ou; (China) Zhang Zhiyu; (Costa Rica) Daniel Esquive	(Dominican Republic) Alejandro Martínez; (Estonia) Henri Keskküla; (Ghana) Bright Ofori; (Honduras) Moises Paredes; (India) Vishnu Raj Menon; (Indonesia) Radityo Senoputro; (Italy) Marco D'Elia; (Kazakhstan) Adilbek Nurakayev	(South Korea) Na Gi-wook; (Kyrgyzstan) Daniel Begaliev; (Latvia) Edvīns Ločmelis; (Lebanon) Jean-Paul Bitar; (Malaysia) Yong Kian Yik; (Mexico) Brian Faugier; (Montenegro) Nemanja Kaludjerović; (Myanmar) Sai Kaung Min Htet; (Nepal) Akshay Rayamajhi; (Northern Ireland) Adam Steenson	(Puerto Rico) José Cotto; (Russia) Denis Khadyko; (Samoa) Makalio Matalio; (Serbia) Nikola Boćanin; (Sierra Leone) Mohamed Kamanoh; (Singapore) Hugo Ong Jun Hui; (South Sudan) Deng Aguer

=== Extreme Challenge ===
Final Result	Contestant
Winner	Ireland – Wayne Walsh
Top 4	Austria – Alberto Nodale; Colombia – Daniel Castrillon; Philippines – Jody Saliba

=== Talent & Creativity ===
Final Result	Contestant
Winner	Tonga – Mikaele Ahomana
Top 3	England – Jack Heslewood; Netherlands – Ashley Peternella
Top 5	Indonesia – Radityo Wahyu; Nigeria – Nelson Enwerem

=== Top Model Challenge ===
Final Result	Contestant
Winner	Mexico – Brian Faugier
Top 5	Dominican Republic – Alejandro Martínez; England – Jack Heslewood; Philippines – Jody Tejano; Venezuela – Jorge Núñez
Top 25	Angola – Pascoal André; Argentina – Leonardo Díaz; Austria – Alberto Nodale; Bosnia and Herzegovina – Darko Milović; Brazil – Carlos Franco; Cambodia – Somkhan Ou; Canada – Alessandro Coward; Chile – Felipe Rojas; China – Zhang Zhiyu; Colombia – Daniel Castrillón; Czech Republic – Jakub Krauś; Italy – Marco D'Elia; Lebanon – Jean-Paul Bitar; Mauritius – Alexandre Curpanen; Northern Ireland – Adam Steenson; Poland – Robert Kapica; Sierra Leone – Mohamed Kamanoh; South Africa – Fezile Mkhize; Spain – Daniel Torres; Thailand – Anakin Nontiprasit

=== Multimedia Challenge ===
Final Result	Contestant
Winner	Nepal – Akshay Rayamajhi
1st Runner Up	Austria – Alberto Nodale
2nd Runner Up	India – Vishnu Raj Menon

== Contestants ==
72 contestants competed for the title.

Country/Territory	Contestant	Age	Height	Hometown
Angola	Pascoal Jorge André	21	1.85 m (6 ft 1 in)	Luanda
Argentina	Leonardo Díaz Alincastro (Note: ARGENTINA – Leonardo Díaz Alincastro was appointed to compete in Mister World 2019 by national director Nadia Cerri, as the original winner Thomas Lietti decided to pursue his modeling career. Díaz was the first runner-up in Mister World Argentina 2017.)	27	1.81 m (5 ft 11 1/2 in)	San Salvador de Jujuy
Armenia	Grigor Vardanyan	26	1.80 m (5 ft 11 in)	Ashtarak
Australia	Jonathan Berry (Note: AUSTRALIA – Jonathan Berry was appointed to compete in Mister World 2019 by national director Deborah Miller, as the original winner Eden Dally declined his invitation for undisclosed reasons. Berry was the second runner-up in Mr World Australia 2019.)	24	1.84 m (6 ft 1/2 in)	Melbourne
Austria	Alberto Nodale	28	1.78 m (5 ft 10 in)	Vienna
Bangladesh	Mahadi Hasan Fahim	22	1.80 m (5 ft 11 in)	Chittagong
Bosnia and Herzegovina	Darko Milović	17	1.91 m (6 ft 3 in)	Foča
Brazil	Carlos Wilton Teodoro Franco	27	1.90 m (6 ft 3 in)	Araras
Bulgaria	Oliver Staykov	28	1.95 m (6 ft 5 in)	Sofia
Cambodia	Somkhan Ou	24	1.82 m (5 ft 11 1/2 in)	Kampong Chhnang
Cameroon	Makala Nganda Courtez	25	1.94 m (6 ft 4 1/2 in)	Buea
Canada	Alessandro Coward	21	1.88 m (6 ft 2 in)	Vancouver
Chile	Felipe Rojas Ramírez	24	1.91 m (6 ft 3 in)	Calama
China	Zhang Zhiyu	19	1.90 m (6 ft 3 in)	Jinan
Colombia	Daniel Castrillón	23	1.85 m (6 ft 1 in)	Medellín
Costa Rica	Daniel Esquivel Navarro	25	1.72 m (5 ft 7 1/2 in)	Sarchí
Curaçao	Naim Jassir Pieter	25	1.86 m (6 ft 1 in)	Willemstad
Czech Republic	Jakub Krauś	29	1.86 m (6 ft 1 in)	Liberec
Dominican Republic	Alejandro Martínez	26	1.90 m (6 ft 3 in)	Salcedo
Ecuador	Daniel Andres Vallejo Arauz	25	1.82 m (5 ft 11 1/2 in)	Manta
El Salvador	David Pivaral	27	1.80 m (5 ft 11 in)	San Salvador
England	Jack Heslewood (Note: ENGLAND – Jack Heslewood was appointed to compete in Mister World 2019 by national director Angie Beasley, as a replacement to the original winner Jack Eyers who decided to pursue his sporting career on the road to Tokyo 2020. Heslewood was the first runner-up in Mister England 2017–2019.)	27	1.91 m (6 ft 3 in)	Hertfordshire
Equatorial Guinea	Joselayt Ebana Miko	20	1.83 m (6 ft 0 in)	Mongomo
Estonia	Henri Keskküla	21	1.76 m (5 ft 9 1/2 in)	Rapla
Finland	Tino Kantonen	21	1.80 m (5 ft 11 in)	Turku
Ghana	Bright Ofori	21	1.88 m (6 ft 2 in)	Koforidua
Greece	Thomas Tzekos	19	1.86 m (6 ft 1 in)	Athens
Guadeloupe	Luigy Manyri	27	1.81 m (5 ft 11 1/2 in)	Les Abymes
Honduras	Moises Darío Paredes Alvarado	25	1.78 m (5 ft 10 in)	Quimistán
India	Vishnu Raj Menon	26	1.84 m (6 ft 1/2 in)	Thrissur
Indonesia	Radityo Wahyu Senoputro	21	1.74 m (5 ft 8 1/2 in)	Bandung
Ireland	Wayne Walsh	28	1.87 m (6 ft 1 1/2 in)	Galway
Italy	Marco D'Elia (Note: ITALY – Marco D'Elia was appointed to compete in Mister World 2019 by Dario Diviacchi, the national director of Mister Italia, as the original winner Mirko Pividore declined his invitation to pursue studies. D'Elia was the first runner-up in Mister Italia 2017.)	22	1.87 m (6 ft 1 1/2 in)	Peschiera del Garda
Japan	Kenta Nagai	26	1.85 m (6 ft 1 in)	Fukuoka
Kazakhstan	Adilbek Nurakayev	21	1.88 m (6 ft 2 in)	Almaty
Kenya	Robert Cula Budi	28	1.75 m (5 ft 9 in)	Nairobi
Kyrgyzstan	Daniel Begaliev	29	1.80 m (5 ft 11 in)	Osh
Latvia	Edvīns Ločmelis	29	1.87 m (6 ft 1 1/2 in)	Gulbene
Lebanon	Jean-Paul Bitar	32	1.83 m (6 ft 0 in)	Beirut
Luxembourg	Owen Hawel (Note: LUXEMBOURG – Owen Hawel was appointed to compete in Mister World 2019, as a replacement to his predecessor Christophe Meisch, by Hervé Lancelin, the president of Miss Luxembourg pageant. Hawel was crowned Mister Luxembourg 2019.)	19	1.83 m (6 ft 0 in)	Luxembourg
Malaysia	Yong Kian Yik	26	1.91 m (6 ft 3 in)	Kuala Lumpur
Malta	Daryl Azzopardi	23	1.85 m (6 ft 1 in)	Swatar
Mauritius	Alexandre Curpanen	21	1.82 m (5 ft 11 1/2 in)	Grand-Gaube
Mexico	Brian Arturo Faugier González	25	1.90 m (6 ft 3 in)	Monterrey
Montenegro	Nemanja Kaludjerović	30	1.89 m (6 ft 2 1/2 in)	Podgorica
Myanmar	Sai Kaung Min Htet	21	1.83 m (6 ft 0 in)	Tachileik
Nepal	Akshay Jung Rayamajhi	23	1.80 m (5 ft 11 in)	Kathmandu
Netherlands	Ashley Karym Peternella (Note: NETHERLANDS – Ashley Karym Peternella was appointed to compete in Mister World 2019 by Katie Maes, the national director of Miss World Nederland, replacing the original winner Wahhab Hassoo.)	27	1.88 m (6 ft 2 in)	Amsterdam
Nicaragua	José Antonio Vallejos Pérez	23	1.83 m (6 ft 0 in)	León
Nigeria	Prince Nelson Enwerem	23	1.83 m (6 ft 0 in)	Calabar
Northern Ireland	Adam Steenson	24	1.81 m (5 ft 11 1/2 in)	Portadown
Panama	Algis Guillermo González Medina	30	1.86 m (6 ft 1 in)	Las Tablas
Paraguay	Alberto Magno Silva Romero	26	1.83 m (6 ft 0 in)	Villeta
Peru	Jano Carper	26	1.78 m (5 ft 10 in)	Lima
Philippines	Jody Baines Tejano Saliba	26	1.78 m (5 ft 10 in)	Olongapo City
Poland	Robert Kapica	23	1.88 m (6 ft 2 in)	Mstów
Puerto Rico	José Humberto Cotto Rodríguez	24	1.88 m (6 ft 2 in)	Río Grande
Russia	Denis Pavlevich Khadyko	26	1.98 m (6 ft 6 in)	Sudak
Samoa	Makalio Junior Matalio Alai	20	1.83 m (6 ft 0 in)	Apia
Serbia	Nikola Boćanin	20	1.88 m (6 ft 2 in)	Vrnjačka Banja
Sierra Leone	Mohamed Kamanoh	22	1.78 m (5 ft 10 in)	Waterloo
Singapore	Hugo Ong Jun Hui	22	1.93 m (6 ft 4 in)	Singapore
Sint Maarten	Learie Hall	23	1.78 m (5 ft 10 in)	Philipsburg
South Africa	Fezile Mkhize	28	1.83 m (6 ft 0 in)	Bloemfontein
South Korea	Na Gi-wook	27	1.82 m (5 ft 11 1/2 in)	Incheon
South Sudan	Deng Aguer Dunga	26	1.87 m (6 ft 1 1/2 in)	Juba
Spain	Daniel Torres Moreno	29	1.90 m (6 ft 3 in)	Málaga
Sri Lanka	Manoj Suranga de Silva	26	1.78 m (5 ft 10 in)	Colombo
Thailand	Anakin Nontiprasit	20	1.80 m (5 ft 11 in)	Maha Sarakham
Tonga	Mikaele Henry Ahomana	24	1.75 m (5 ft 9 in)	Nukuʻalofa
United States	Andresito Germosen De La Cruz (Note: UNITED STATES – Andresito Germosen dela Cruz was appointed to compete in Mister World 2019 by Michael Blakey, the national director of Miss World America and Mister World United States, as the original winner Keaton Parker West stepped down from the title to pursue his modelling career and college education.)	23	1.76 m (5 ft 9 1/2 in)	New York City
Venezuela	Jorge Eduardo Núñez Martínez	24	1.86 m (6 ft 1 in)	Cabimas

== Notes ==
=== Debuts ===
- Armenia
- Bangladesh
- Cambodia
- Cameroon
- Ecuador
- Equatorial Guinea
- Finland
- Mauritius
- Myanmar
- Saint Maarten
- Samoa
- Sierra Leone
- South Sudan
- Tonga

=== Returns ===
Last competed in 1996:

- Estonia

Last competed in 2007:

- Chile

Last competed in 2010:

- Angola
- Indonesia
- Kazakhstan
- Montenegro
- Serbia
- Thailand

Last competed in 2012:

- Bosnia and Herzegovina
- Czech Republic
- Luxembourg
- Singapore

Last competed in 2014:

- Australia
- Colombia
- Dominican Republic
- Latvia
- Lebanon
- Netherlands
- Paraguay
- Russia
- Venezuela

=== Withdrawals ===
- Bolivia – Christian Daniel Terán Anzaldo withdrew from the competition for undisclosed reasons.
- Denmark – No delegate was appointed due to a lack of funding and sponsorship.
- France – No delegate was appointed due to lack of funding and sponsorship.
- Germany – No delegate was appointed after Mister Deutschland lost its franchise.
- Moldova – No delegate was appointed due to a lack of funding and sponsorship.
- Romania – No delegate was appointed due to lack of funding and sponsorship.
- Scotland – Ian Alan Scott Adie withdrew from the competition for undisclosed reasons.
- Sweden – Johannes Leonidas Ulmefors suffered a high fever a few days before flying to Manila and thereby withdrew from the competition.
- Switzerland – No delegate was appointed after Mister Suisse Francophone lost its franchise.
- Vietnam – The Mister World Vietnam Organization originally revealed they would be sending Trần Công Hậu to the competition, but the representation did not push through for undisclosed reasons.
- Wales – Luke Williams withdrew from the competition for undisclosed reasons.

=== Crossovers ===
Mister Supranational

- 2024: South Africa - Fezile Mkhize (Winner)

Manhunt International

- 2018: England – Jack Heslewood (as United Kingdom; Top 15)

Mister International

- 2011: Latvia – Edvīns Ločmelis
- 2015: Czech Republic – Jakub Krauś (Top 5)
- 2016: Spain – Daniel Torres Moreno (Top 9)
- 2024: Mexico – Brian Arturo Faugier González (Top 10)

Mister Universal Ambassador

- 2016: Dominican Republic – Alejandro Martínez (Top 5)

Mister Globe

- 2021: Kazakhstan – Adilbek Nurakayev

Mister Model International

- 2018: Italy – Marco D'Elia (1st runner-up)

Mister Gay World

- 2013: Netherlands – Ashley Karym Peternella (as Aruba; 3rd runner-up)
