= Mister Slovak Republic =

National male beauty pageant competition in the Slovak Republic

- Formation: 1999
- Type: Male pageant
- Headquarters: Bratislava
- Location: Slovak Republic
- Members: Mister Supranational; Manhunt International; Mister International
- Official language: Slovak
- Director: David Novotný

Mister Slovak Republic is an annual national male beauty pageant that selects Slovak Republic's representatives to participate globally.

== History ==
Mister Slovak Republic was established in 2008 by Muž Roku Organization. The titleholders will represent their country at the Mister Supranational, Manhunt International and Mister International pageants. Since 2016 the organization is only taking the Mister Supranational franchise.

In 2010 Peter Meňky named as Manhunt International 2010 in China. He was Muž Roku Slovenskej Republiky 2009 crowned by Muž Roku Organization.

== Representatives at international pageants ==
=== Mister Supranational ===
- : Declared as Winner
- : Ended as runner-up
- : Ended as one of the finalists or semifinalists

Year	Election	Representative	Placement	Special Awards
2016	Muž Roku Slovenskej Republiky	Karol Kotlár	Top 20	Mister Personality
2017	Muž Roku Slovenskej Republiky	Michal Gajdošech	3rd Runner-up	Best Body
2018	Muž Roku Slovenskej Republiky	Ján Palko	Top 10	Mister Supranational Europe
2019	Muž Roku Slovenskej Republiky	Tomáš Kucuk	Unplaced	
2021	Muž Roku Slovenskej Republiky	Marek Jastráb	Top 20	
2023	Muž Roku Slovenskej Republiky	Tomáš Benko	Unplaced	
2024	Muž Roku Slovenskej Republiky	Adam Palkovič	Unplaced	
2026	Muž Roku Slovenskej Republiky	Karol Tóth	TBD	

=== Manhunt International ===
- : Declared as Winner
- : Ended as runner-up
- : Ended as one of the finalists or semifinalists

Year	Election	Representative	Placement	Special Awards
1999	Mister Slovak Republic	Roman Valenta	Unplaced	
2002	Mister Slovak Republic	Aleksander Kokotovic	Unplaced	
2010	Muž Roku Slovenskej Republiky	Peter Meňky	Manhunt International 2010	Mister Photogenic
2011	Muž Roku Slovenskej Republiky	Martin Smahel	4th Runner-up	
2012	Muž Roku Slovenskej Republiky	Karol Maly	Unplaced	
2016	Muž Roku Slovenskej Republiky	Kristián Kučera	Top 16	

=== Mister International ===
- : Declared as Winner
- : Ended as runner-up
- : Ended as one of the finalists or semifinalists

Year	Election	Representative	Placement	Special Awards
2010	Muž Roku Slovenskej Republiky	Adam Barabáš	Unplaced	
2011	Muž Roku Slovenskej Republiky	Jakub Lorencović	Top 10	
2012	Muž Roku Slovenskej Republiky	Ján Haraslín	4th Runner-up	
2013	Muž Roku Slovenskej Republiky	Michal Gajdosech	Top 10	
