= Nelson Enwerem =

Mr Nigeria winner 2018

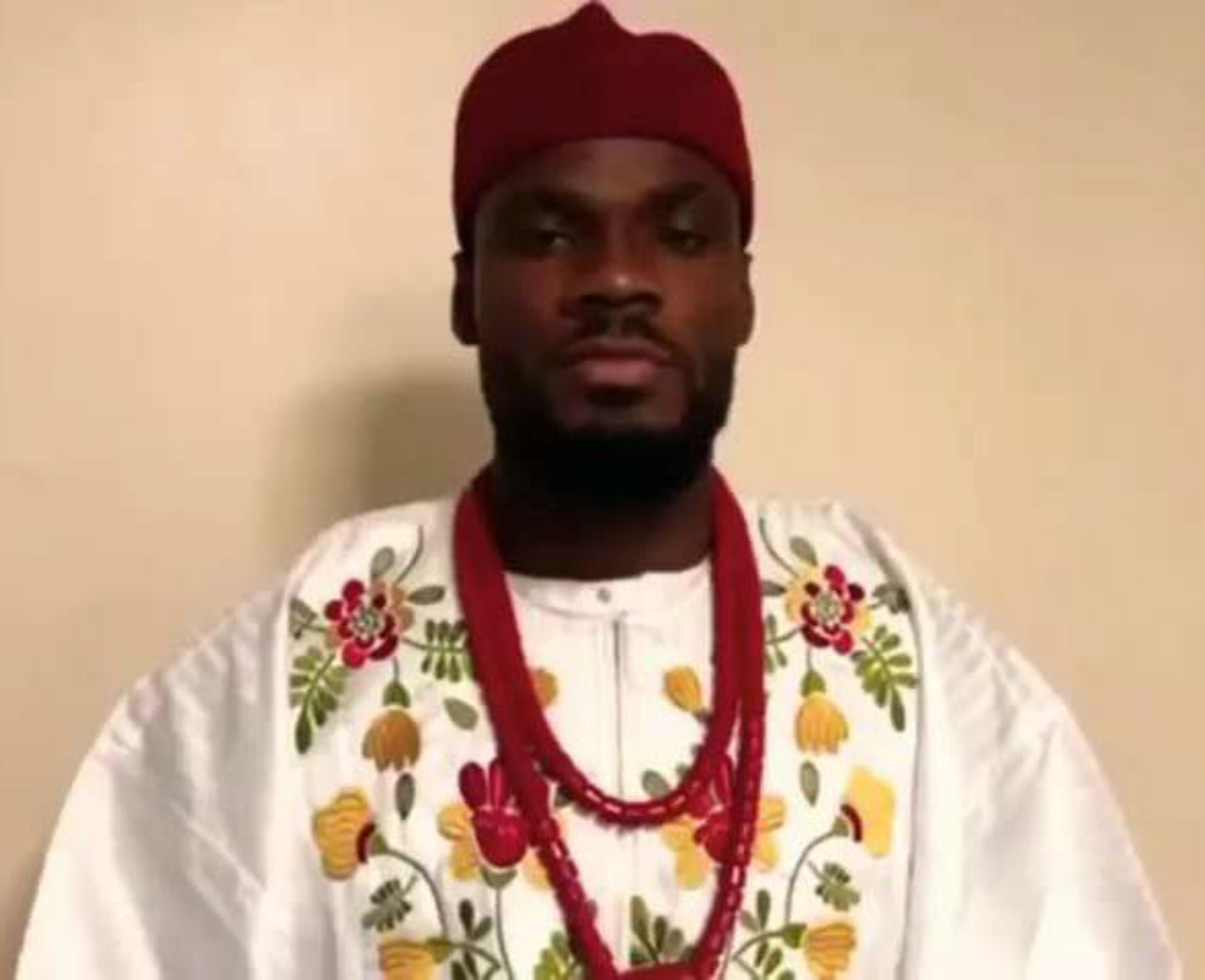
- Born: Aba, Abia State, Nigeria
- Education: University of Calabar
- Height: 1.83 m (6 ft 0 in)
- Beauty pageant titleholder
- Title: Mr Nigeria 2018
- Hair color: Black
- Eye color: Brown
- Major competitions: Mister World 2019 (Top 29)

Nelson Enwerem, known professionally as Prince, is a Nigerian actor, TV host, model and beauty pageant titleholder who won Mr Nigeria 2018. He represented Nigeria at the Mister World 2019 and was placed in the top 26. On 19 July 2020, he entered as the number three contestant in the Big Brother Naija season 5 and finished in ninth place.

== Early life and education ==
Enwerem was born and raised in Aba, Abia State. He went to Government College Umuahia for his secondary school education before preceding to University of Calabar where he studied pure physics. While in the university, Enwerem contested and won Face of University Nigeria 2016.

== Career ==
=== Mr Nigeria 2018 ===
In 2018, Enwerem competed and won the title of Mr Nigeria 2018 competition that was held on 28 October 2018 at the Silverbird Galleria, Victoria Island, Lagos, Nigeria. He also won Most Talented contestant in the competition. Afterwards, Enwerem earned the right to represent Nigeria at Mister World 2019.

=== Mister World 2019 ===
Enwerem represented Nigeria at the Mister World 2019 that was held on 23 August 2019 at the Smart Araneta Coliseum, Quezon City, Metro Manila, Philippines. He was placed in the top 29 and was placed in the top 5 best talents in the competition, winning the talent award of being the best in graceful contemporary dance.

=== Brand ambassador and brand influencer ===
After his stay at big brother, Prince Nelson Enwerem became a brand ambassador for various brands in Nigeria. He has appeared in adverts for Showmax, Dstv, Guinness and Samsung. He creates some of the content for the brands he works with on his Instagram account, directing the adverts and coming up with the idea behind it.

=== Actor, host and model ===
Prince Nelson Enwerem have acted in couple of movies named Head over bills where he played Leo and MOG the movie where his role was being a pastor. Head over bills will be available in cinemas all over Nigeria from 4 February 2022. He took it to twitter that he will be part of Netflix original movie.

He has hosted few events in Lagos and Abuja. He was also a judge and a speaker at African hair summit. He was chosen as a host at house at Guinness Bright House party for fashion master class. Hosted few Samsung meet and greet along aside with his colleague. He recently announced that he will have magazine TV show with MTV Base.

Prior to his Big Brother appearance, Enwerem worked as a model, winning Model of the Year in 2016, and has modelled for the 2022 Kimono Kollection. He is known as a person that has a good eye for fashion and won couple awards for being fashionable celebrity/influencer of year. He has been named as one of the best dressed men in events he has attended.

In 2022, Enwerem appeared in the movie The Man of God.

=== CEO of Hairline Royale ===
Prince Nelson Enwerem recently announced that he will be launching his very own Salon on 19 December 2021. He is the CEO of the Hairline Royale and a professional barber. Not only does he barber hair but he also braid cornrows. He started learning about hair before going to big brother house in 2020 and while in the house he did his fellow housemates' hair. He also recently introduced a new method that will be offered in his Salon which is known as wig installation for men. It's for men that have baldness and bald spots. Hairline Royale will offer different kinds of hairstyles for men, ladies and also children. Other services will be offered. The location of his salon is in Lagos, Lekki.

== Personal life ==
Enwerem is from Umuebie, Ugirinna, Isiala Mbano, Imo State, Nigeria and a member of the royal family. His father is HRH Eze Leo Mike Enwerem, Ebi I of Umuebie, Ugirinna Isiala Mbano. His mother is Ugoeze Catherine Chika Enwerem.

== Filmography ==
=== Feature films ===
Year	Title	Role	Notes
2022	Head Over Bills	Leo	
2022	Man of God	Pastor BJ	

=== Television ===
Year	Title	Role	Notes
2020	Big Brother season 5	Himself	Reality show

Awards and achievements
Preceded by Emmanuel Ikubese	Mr Nigeria; 2018	Incumbent
