= Funskool =

Indian toy manufacturing company

Funskool (India) Ltd.
- Type: Subsidiary
- Industry: Toys
- Founded: Madras, Tamil Nadu, India (1987; 39 years ago)
- Headquarters: Tarapore Towers, 6th Floor, 826, Anna Salai, Chennai, Tamil Nadu, India
- Number of locations: 13 (April 2016)
- Area served: Worldwide
- Key people: R Jeswant (CEO)
- Revenue: ▲₹235 crore (US$24 million) (FY18)
- Owners: MRF Ltd.
- Website: www.funskoolindia.com

Funskool (India) Ltd. is an Indian toy manufacturing company, founded in 1987 with headquarters in Chennai, Tamil Nadu. Apart from its own brands and its American counterpart Playskool, the company also manufactures and distributes products in the Indian market under license from foreign toy brands including Hasbro, Disney, Warner Bros., Takara Tomy, and Ravensburger.

Initially a joint-venture between Hasbro and MRF, the former backed out of the venture in 2014, becoming a wholly owned subsidiary of MRF in the process.

== History ==
Funskool was established in 1987 as a joint venture by MRF Ltd. and American toy manufacturer Hasbro, Inc. The company began commercial operations the following year. Funskool manufactures all its products (including licensed products) at manufacturing facilities in Ranipet and in Goa. Funskool opened its third manufacturing at Ranipet on 20 March 2019, which is dedicated to handling exports.

The company's main competitors in the Indian market are Mattel and Fisher-Price. In 2014, Funskool surpassed Mattel to become the market leader in the mid to premium range of the Indian toy market. That same year, Hasbro sold its stake in Funskool to MRF as the company opened a regional division in India.

Funskool's licence to manufacture Lego products was discontinued in 2019. In June 2022, the company acquired the rights to manufacture and distribute the board game Abalone from Asmodee. In July 2022, Funskool acquired the licence to manufacture action figures based on characters from Green Gold Animations' Chhota Bheem series.

Funskool products are currently exported to Africa, ASEAN countries, Bangladesh, Bhutan, China, Europe, the Gulf Cooperation Council countries, Maldives, Mongolia, Nepal, Oceania, Pakistan, Russia, Sri Lanka, and the United States.

== Stores ==
Funskool opened a Lego store in Chennai in 2013. Following the success of the venture, the company opened the first Funskool store in Coimbatore in March 2014. By September 2015, the company had opened one store each in eight cities across the country.

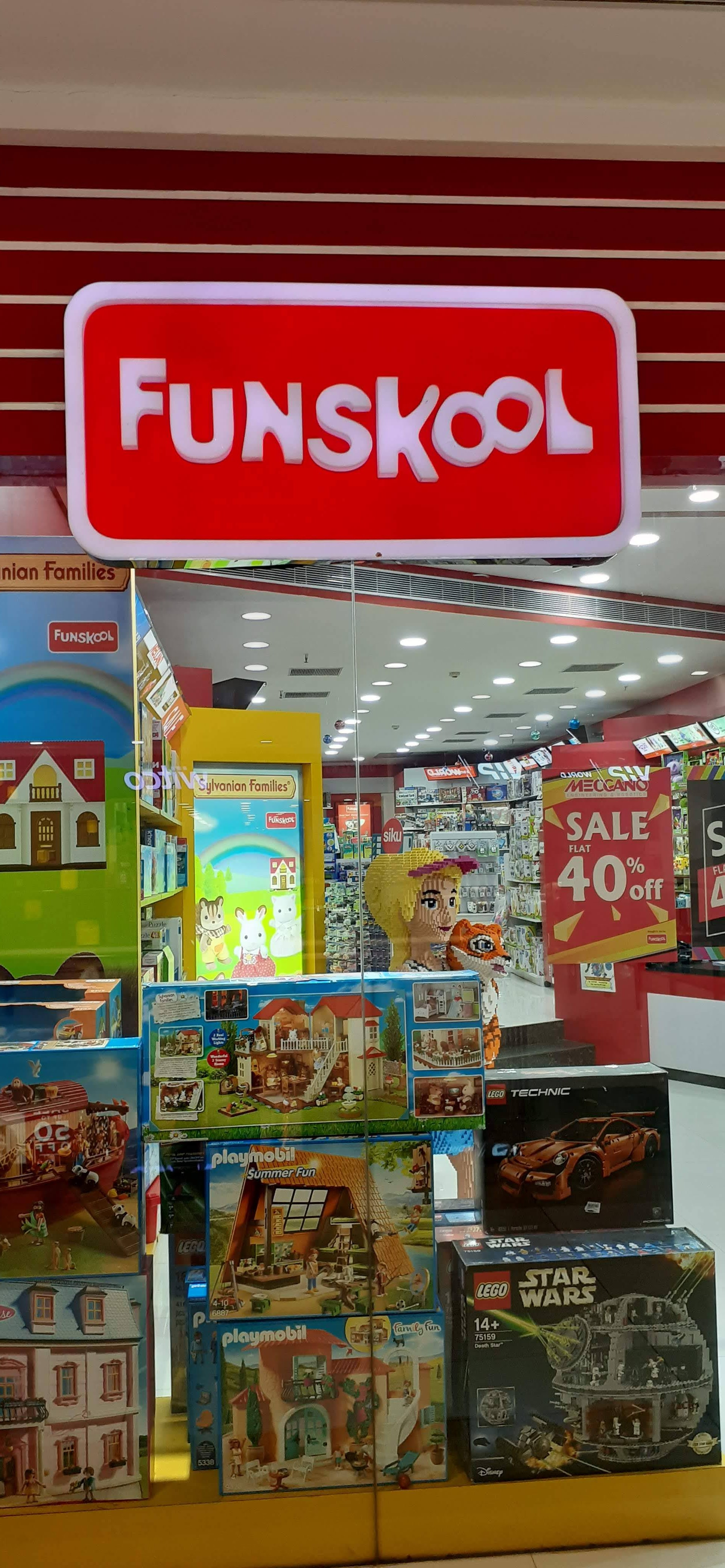
Funskool Store, Chennai, Tamil Nadu, India.

Most Funskool stores are operated by franchisees. As of February 2021, there are 18 Funskool stores nationwide.

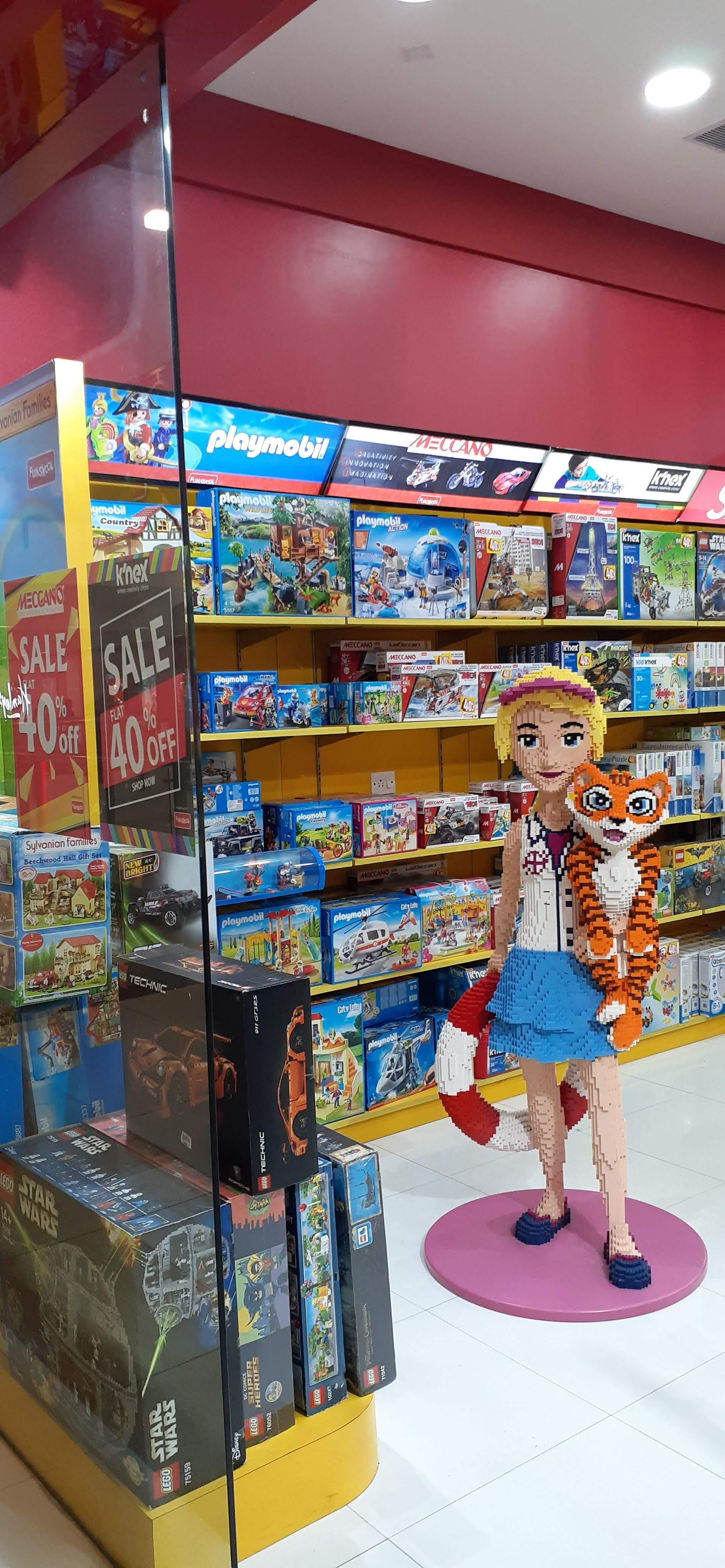
Display at Funskool Store in Chennai, Tamil Nadu, India.
