= Vishnu Raj Menon =

Indian model

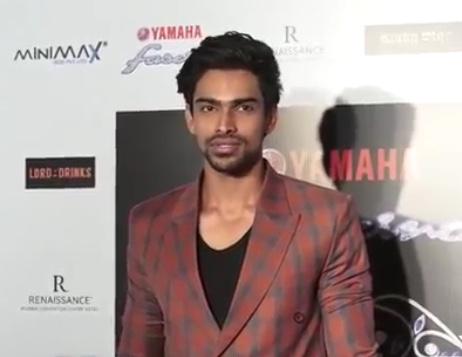
- Born: 10 June 1991 (age 35); Thrissur, Kerala, India
- Education: MVJ College of Engineering, Bangalore, India
- Occupation: Model
- Height: 6 ft 1 in (185 cm)
- Beauty pageant titleholder
- Title: Mr India 2016
- Years active: 2015–present
- Hair color: Black
- Eye color: Black
- Major competitions: Mr India 2016 (Winner) (Mr Photogenic); Mister World 2019 (Unplaced)

Vishnu Raj Menon is an Indian model and a beauty pageant titleholder who won Mr. India 2016.

== Early life and career ==
Vishnu was born on 10 June 1991 in Pattikkad, Thrissur, Kerala, India. His father, Surendran is a retired PWD engineer, while his mother, Padmavati, is an assistant bank manager. He did his schooling from Don Bosco School, Mannuthy in Kerala and shifted to Bangalore for further studies. He is a civil engineer and a model by profession. He has graduated from MVJ College of Engineering, Bangalore. He was crowned Mister India by the outgoing titleholder Rohit Khandelwal on 11 December 2016 in Mumbai.
Vishnu represented India at the Mister World pageant held on August 23, 2019 in Manila, Philippines.

Awards and achievements
Preceded by Rohit Khandelwal	Mr India World; 2016	Succeeded by Jitesh Singh Deo
