= Mr India 2016 =

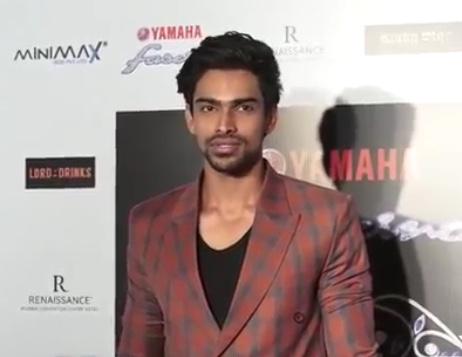
- Peter England Mr India 2016
- Date: 11 December 2016
- Venue: Club Royalty, Mumbai, Maharashtra; India
- Broadcaster: Zoom
- Entrants: 16
- Placements: 6
- Winner: Vishnu Raj Menon; Kerala
- Photogenic: Vishnu Raj Menon; Kerala

Mister India 2016 was a contest held in Mumbai on 11 December 2016. Sixteen contestants from all over the country were shortlisted to compete in the main event held in Mumbai. Previous year's winner, Mr India 2015 and Mister World 2016, Rohit Khandelwal passed on his title to Vishnu Raj Menon of Kerala. Viren Barman from New Delhi was declared the 1st Runner Up and Altamash Faraz from New Delhi was declared the 2nd Runner Up at the grand finale held in Club Royalty, Mumbai.

Vishnu Raj Menon represented India at the Mister World 2019 contest which held in Manila, Philippines on 27 January 2019. Altamash Faraz titled as Mr India Supranational 2017 and represented India at Mister Supranational 2017 at Poland where he ended up placing to Top 10 finalists

== Results ==
Color keys

- The contestant Won in an International pageant.
- The contestant was a Runner-up in an International pageant.
- The contestant was a Semi-Finalist in an International pageant.

Placement	Contestant	International Placement
Mister India World 2016	Vishnu Raj Menon	Unplaced – Mister World 2019
Mister India Supranational 2017	Altamash Faraz	Top 10 – Mister Supranational 2017
1st Runner Up	Varun Verma	Top 10 – Mister Supranational 2019
2nd Runner Up	Devesh Khanduja	
Top 9	Bunty Rana; Colin Jacob; Dev Paimal	

=== Special awards ===
Award	Contestant
Peter England Mr Photogenic	Vishnu Raj Menon
Peter England Mr Talented	Tejas Ravi Shankar
Times Top Model	Dev Paimal
Dr. Tvacha Mr Healthy Hair	Altamash Faraz
Mr Popular	Tejas Ravi Shankar
Peter England Mr Perfect Body	Varun Verma
O'Cean Mr Active	Ponnanna CB
Best Actor	Rakesh Sharma
Prosport Mr Personality	Tejas Ravi Shankar

== Contestants ==
- 16 contestants from all over India were shortlisted to compete in the main event in Mumbai.

Contestant No.	Name	State	Profession
01	Altamash Faraz	Delhi	Actor
02	Ankit Raj Pawar	Delhi	Model
03	Bharat Sainani	Rajasthan	Engineer, Model
04	Bunty Rana	Haryana	Actor, Model
05	Colin Jacob	Assam	Hotelier
06	Dev Paimal	Madhya Pradesh	Actor, Model
07	Devesh Khanduja	Delhi	Actor, Model
08	Lalit Choudhary	Rajasthan	Actor, Model
09	Madhu Mohan	Kerala	Actor, Model
10	Ponnanna CB	Karnataka	Actor, Model
11	Shubham Nagar	Uttar Pradesh	Model
12	Sourabh Arya	Madhya Pradesh	Model
13	Tejas Ravi Shankar	Maharashtra	Actor, Dancer, Voice-over Artist
14	Varun Verma	Delhi	Engineer
15	Viren Barman	Delhi	Lifestyle Consultant
16	Vishnu Raj Menon	Kerala	Engineer
