= Miss and Mister Supranational =

International beauty pageant

Miss Supranational is an annual international beauty pageant based in Poland, founded in 2009 and organized by the World Beauty Association and Nowa Scena. In 2016, the organization introduced a male counterpart, Mister Supranational, with its first edition taking place in Krynica-Zdrój.

The current titleholders of both pageants are Katrina Llegado from the Philippines, crowned on July 31, 2026, and Pedro Cordero from Spain, who was crowned separately on August 1, 2026, in Nowy Sącz.

== Miss Supranational ==
Miss Supranational
- Type: International women's beauty pageant
- Headquarters: Warsaw, Poland
- First edition: 2009
- Most recent edition: 2026
- Current titleholder: Katrina Llegado; Philippines
- President: Gerhard Parzutka von Lipinski
- Language: English
- Website: misssupranational.com

Miss Supranational is managed by the World Beauty Association S.A., which was founded in 2009 in Panama. The first World Beauty Association president was Tryny Marcela Yandar Lobón, with Gerhard Parzutka von Lipinski from Poland as executive producer and president of the production company Nowa Scena.

Parzutka von Lipinski has been referred to as the President of Miss Supranational since at least 2017.

The Miss Supranational contests began in 2009 and were held in Poland except 2013 which was in Minsk, Belarus, and 2016, which was co-hosted with Poprad, Slovakia. Mister Supranational also began in 2016, in Krynica-Zdrój, Poland.

The World Beauty Association, based in Hong Kong, organized a rival Miss Supranational 2014 pageant in India which could not be held in person due to responses to the West African Ebola virus epidemic. It crowned one candidate, Jennifer Poleo of Venezuela, remotely, and without runners-up, and did not hold any subsequent contests.

The Miss and Mister Supranational 2020 contests were postponed to 2021 due to the COVID-19 pandemic, with Anntonia Porsild from Thailand and Nate Crnkovich from the United States to retain their respective titles until then. 2020 was the first year that the Miss and Mister Supranational contests were not held since their inception.

=== Editions ===
The following is a list of Miss Supranational pageant edition and information.

Edition	Year	Date	Venue	Host country	Ref.
1st	2009	September 5	Płock Amphitheater, Płock, Masovian	Poland	
2nd	2010	August 28	Płock Amphitheater, Płock, Masovian	Poland	
3rd	2011	August 26	Płock Amphitheater, Płock, Masovian	Poland	
4th	2012	September 14	Hala Mera Studio, Warsaw, Masovian	Poland	
5th	2013	September 6	Minsk Sports Palace, Minsk	Belarus	
6th	2014	December 5	Hala MOSiR, Krynica-Zdrój, Lesser Poland	Poland	
7th	2015	December 4	Hala MOSiR, Krynica-Zdrój, Lesser Poland	Poland	
8th	2016	December 2	Hala MOSiR, Krynica-Zdrój, Lesser Poland	Poland	
9th	2017	December 1	Hala MOSiR, Krynica-Zdrój, Lesser Poland	Poland	
10th	2018	December 7	Hala MOSiR, Krynica-Zdrój, Lesser Poland	Poland	
11th	2019	December 6	Katowice International Congress Centre, Katowice, Silesian	Poland	
2020 Cancelled due to the COVID-19 pandemic. (Note: The 2019 titleholder Anntonia Porsild reigned Miss Supranational until 2021 due to the cancellation of the 2020 pageant because of the worldwide COVID-19 pandemic)
12th	2021	August 21	Strzelecki Park Amphitheater, Nowy Sącz, Lesser Poland	Poland	
13th	2022	July 15	Strzelecki Park Amphitheater, Nowy Sącz, Lesser Poland	Poland	
14th	2023	July 14	Strzelecki Park Amphitheater, Nowy Sącz, Lesser Poland	Poland	
15th	2024	July 6	Strzelecki Park Amphitheater, Nowy Sącz, Lesser Poland	Poland	
16th	2025	June 27	Strzelecki Park Amphitheater, Nowy Sącz, Lesser Poland	Poland	
17th	2026	July 31	Strzelecki Park Amphitheater, Nowy Sącz, Lesser Poland	Poland	

=== Crowns of Miss Supranational ===
- The Blue Blossom Crown (2009–2021; 2024–2025) was designed by jeweler and crown maker George Wittels from Venezuela. It is made of a fine silver base bordered by numerous white crystals, diamonds, and soft blue sapphires, at an approximate cost of US$300,000. Over the years, the crown has undergone several modifications but retained the significant elements of its original design. The Blue Blossom crown was retired in 2025 after the reign of Eduarda Braum from Brazil.
- The Supranational Crown (2022–2023) is the second Miss Supranational crown, designed by Mexican jeweler and crown maker Ricardo Patraca. It was unveiled during the 13th Miss Supranational competition. The crown was inspired by the pageant's slogan: Inspirational – Aspirational. It represents the union and the friendship that never ends the bonds. The lines go up from the bottom of the crown towards the upper part, symbolizing the inspirational aspect of Miss Supranational. The side of the crown has a motif representing the ribbons that are usually used to symbolize different social causes. The blue stones represent the peace and the family that usually characterizes the pageant. Only Lalela Mswane from South Africa in 2022 and Andrea Aguilera from Ecuador in 2023 had the opportunity to wear this crown.
- The Fioletowa Crown (2026–Present) is the third Miss Supranational crown, designed by Venezuelan jeweler and crown maker George Wittels, marking his return as the pageant's crown designer. It was unveiled during the 17th Miss Supranational competition. The name Fioletowa, meaning "purple" in Polish, references the pageant's Polish origins and the color linked with the new Miss Supranational branding. The crown maintains a similar silhouette to the Blue Blossom Crown, featuring new purple gemstones reflecting the pageant's values of confidence, purpose, resilience, and elegance. The purple gemstones embellished on the crown symbolize ambition and royalty. Katrina Llegado from the Philippines was the first to wear this crown after she won in 2026.

=== Gallery of Miss Supranational crowns ===
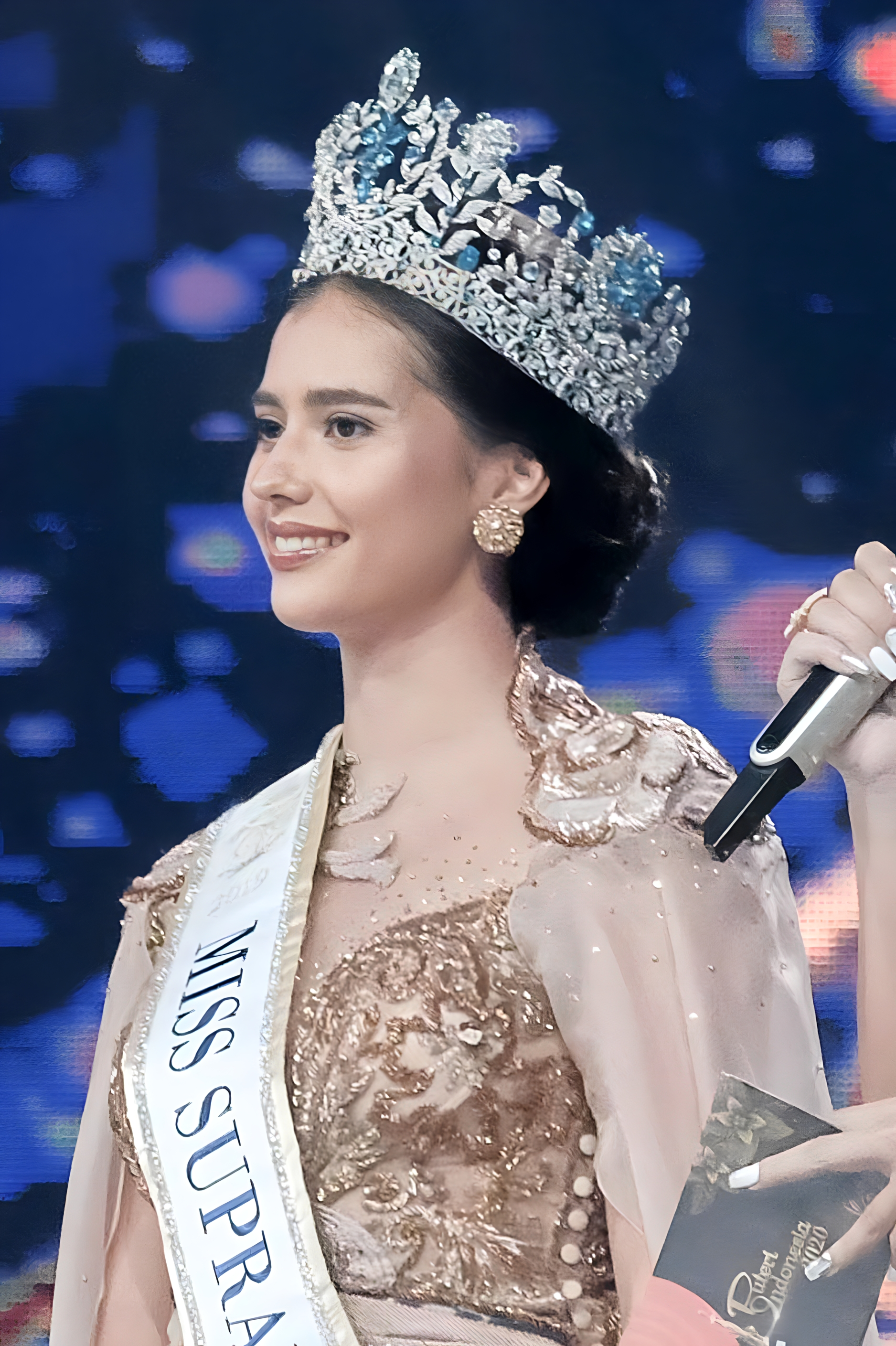
The Blue Blossom Crown, as worn by Miss Supranational 2019, Anntonia Porsild

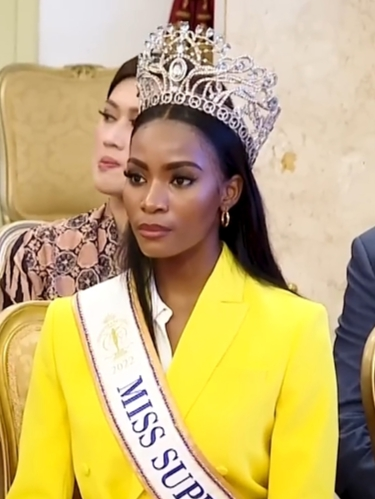
The Supranational Crown, as worn by Miss Supranational 2022, Lalela Mswane

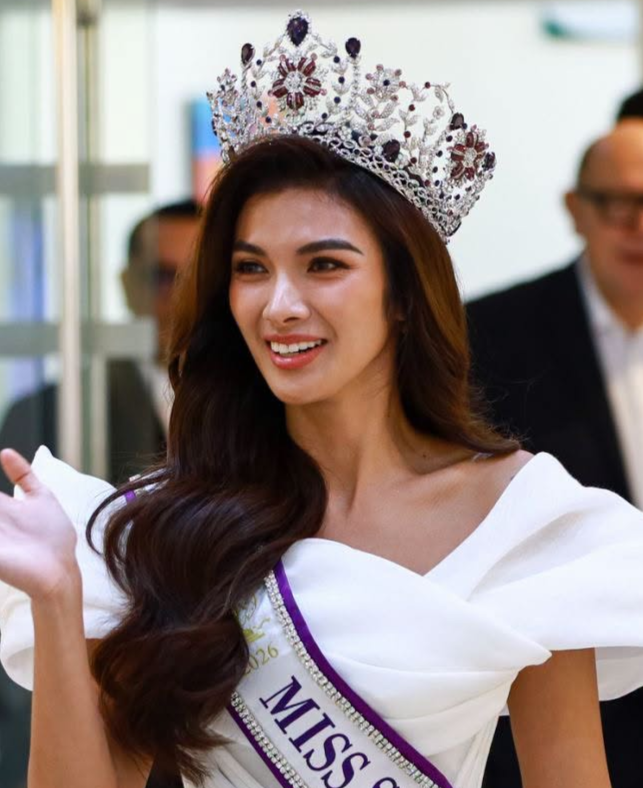
The Fioletowa Crown, as worn by Miss Supranational 2026, Katrina Llegado

=== Gallery of winners ===
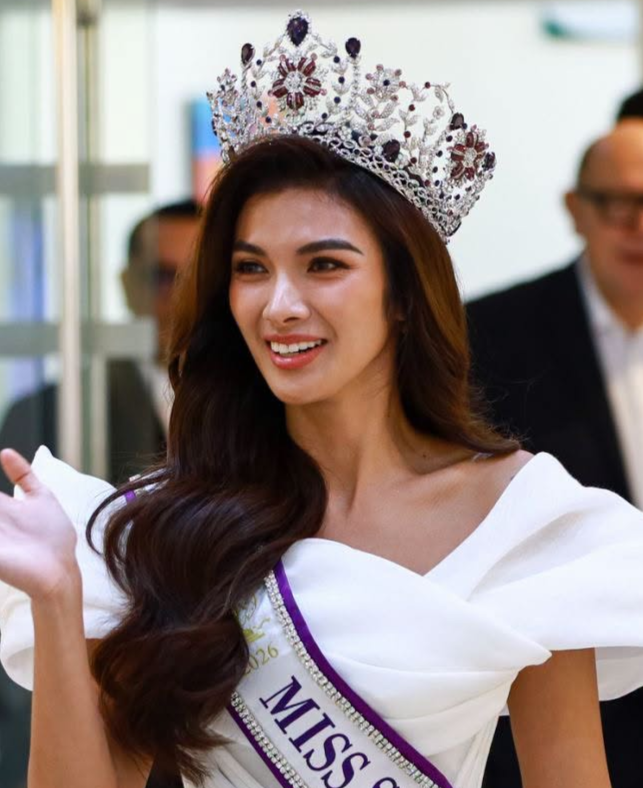
Miss Supranational 2026
Katrina Llegado,
Philippines

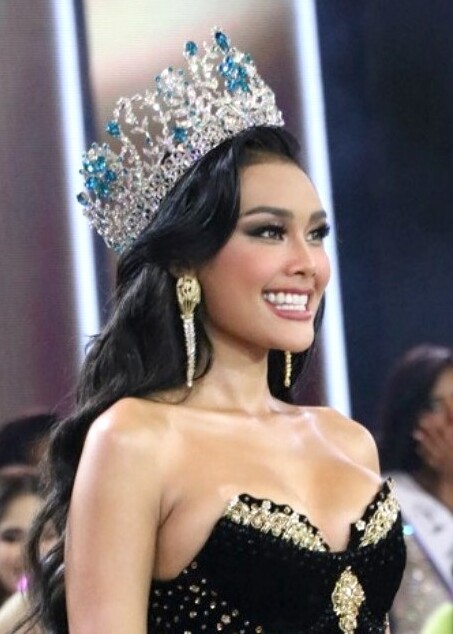
Miss Supranational 2024
Harashta Haifa Zahra,
Indonesia

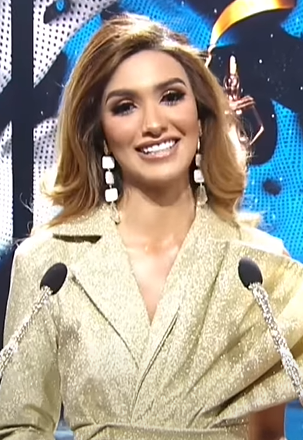
Miss Supranational 2023
Andrea Aguilera,
Ecuador

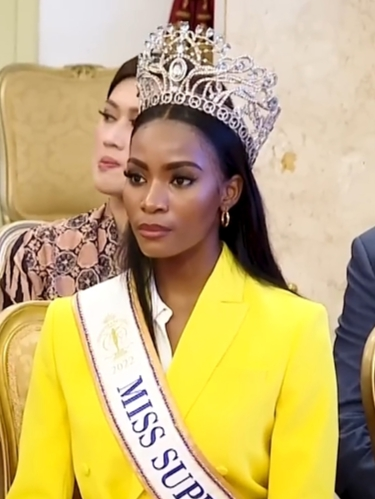
Miss Supranational 2022
Lalela Mswane,
South Africa

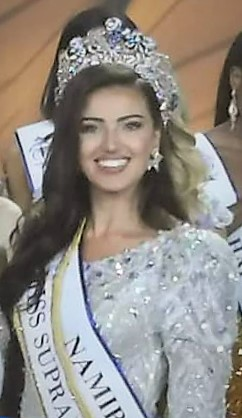
Miss Supranational 2021
Chanique Rabe,
Namibia

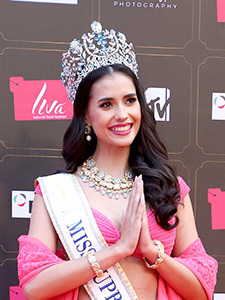
Miss Supranational 2019
Anntonia Porsild,
Thailand

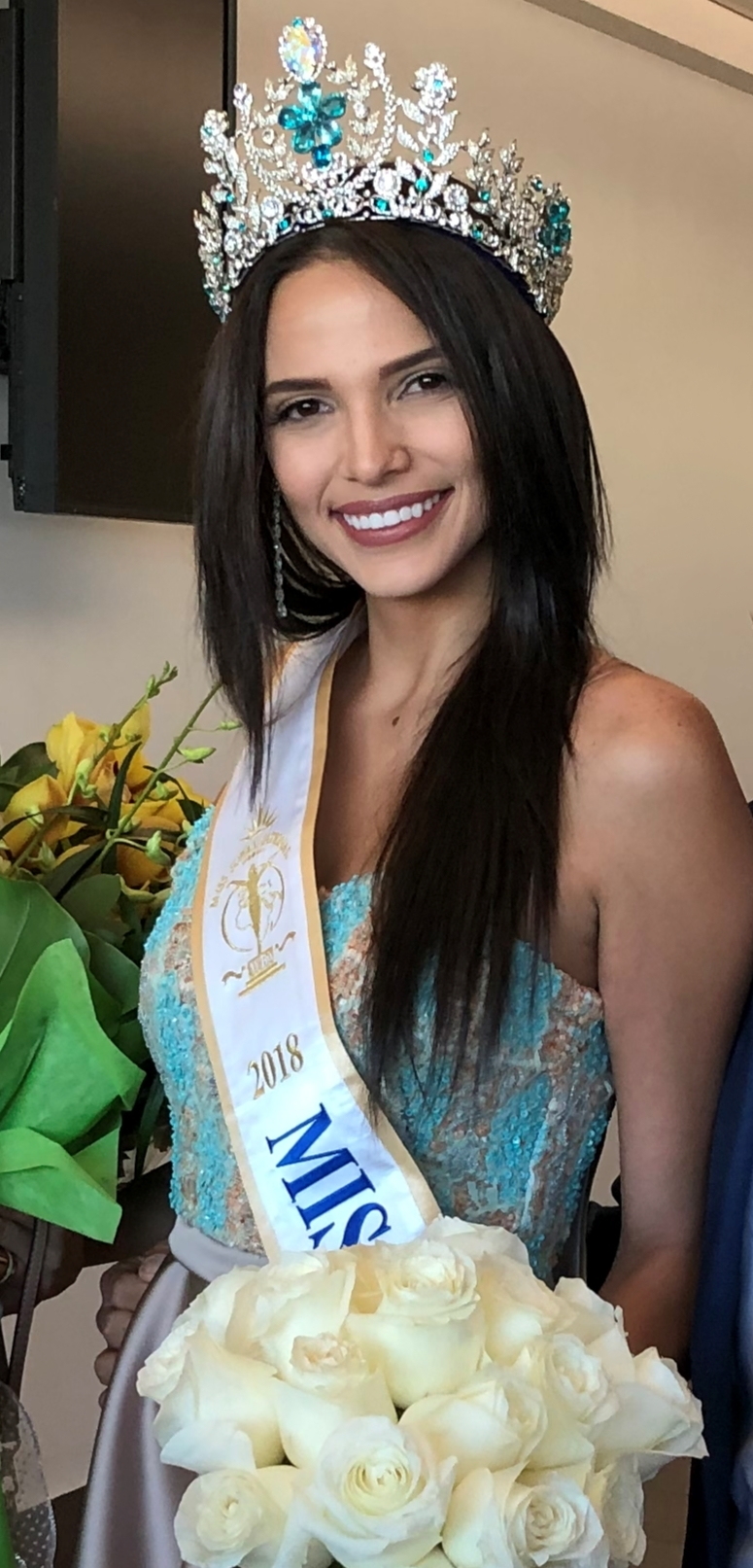
Miss Supranational 2018
Valeria Vázquez,
Puerto Rico

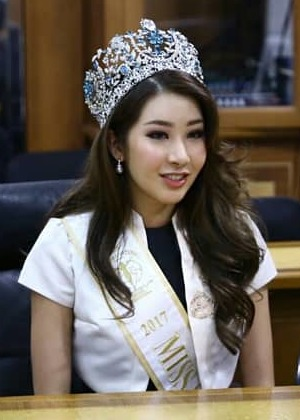
Miss Supranational 2017
Jenny Kim,
South Korea

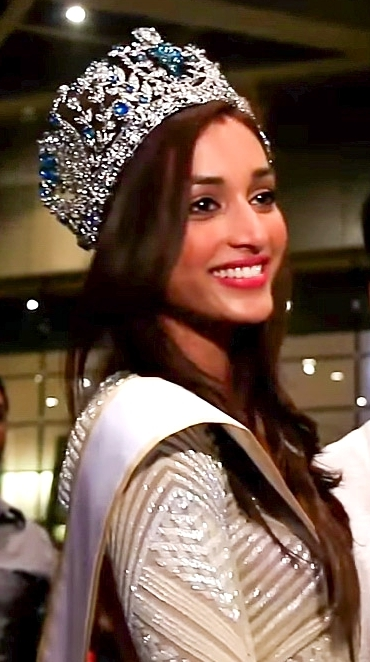
Miss Supranational 2016
Srinidhi Shetty,
India

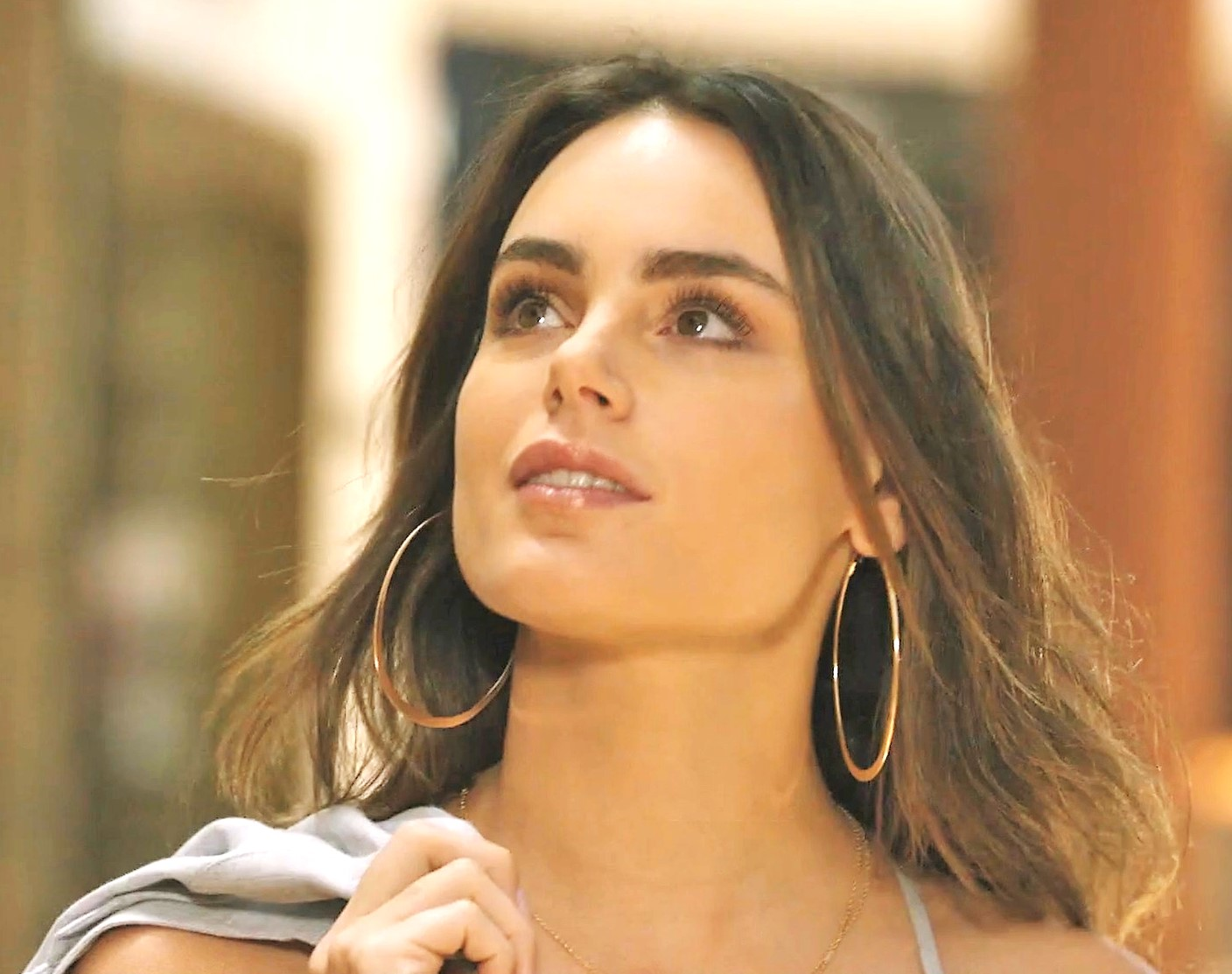
Miss Supranational 2015
Stephania Stegman,
Paraguay

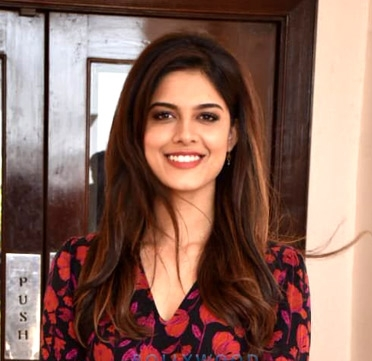
Miss Supranational 2014
Asha Bhat,
India

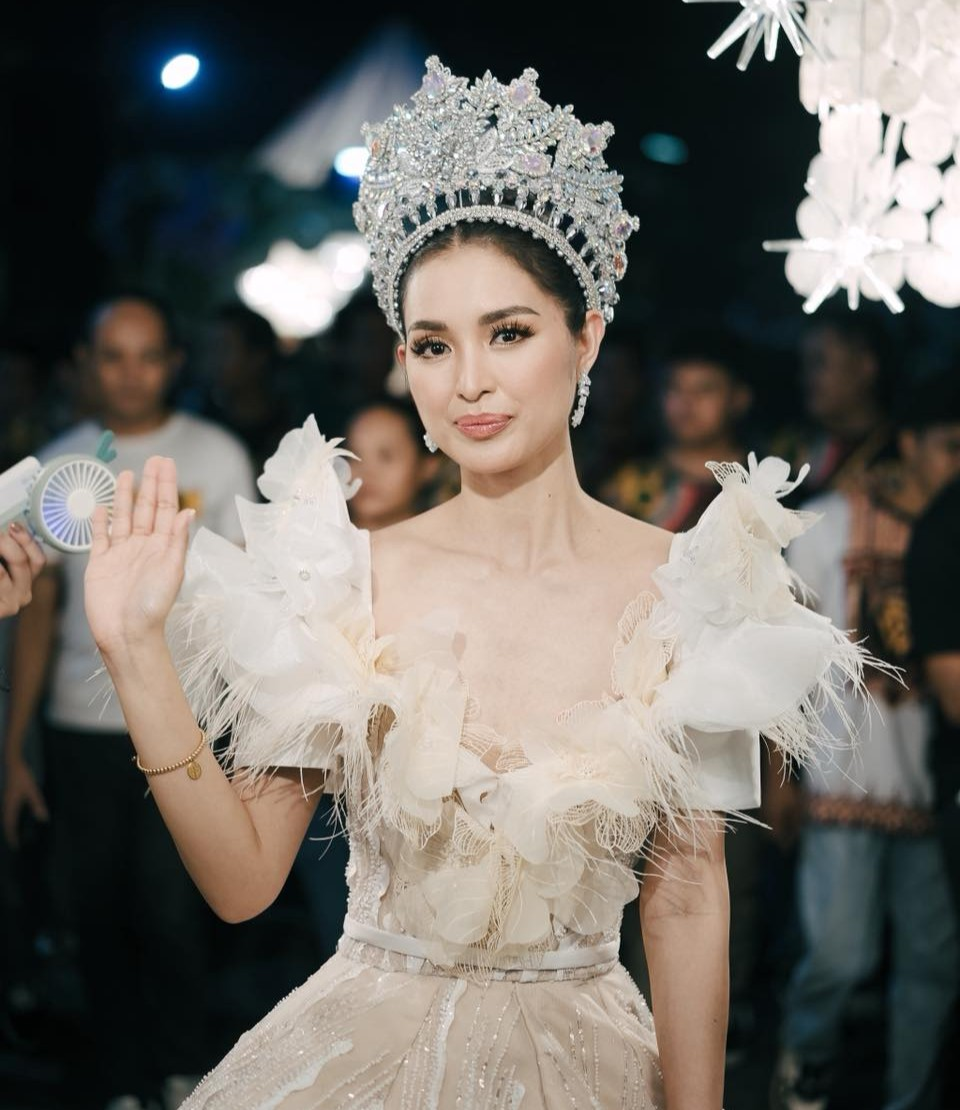
Miss Supranational 2013
Mutya Datul,
Philippines

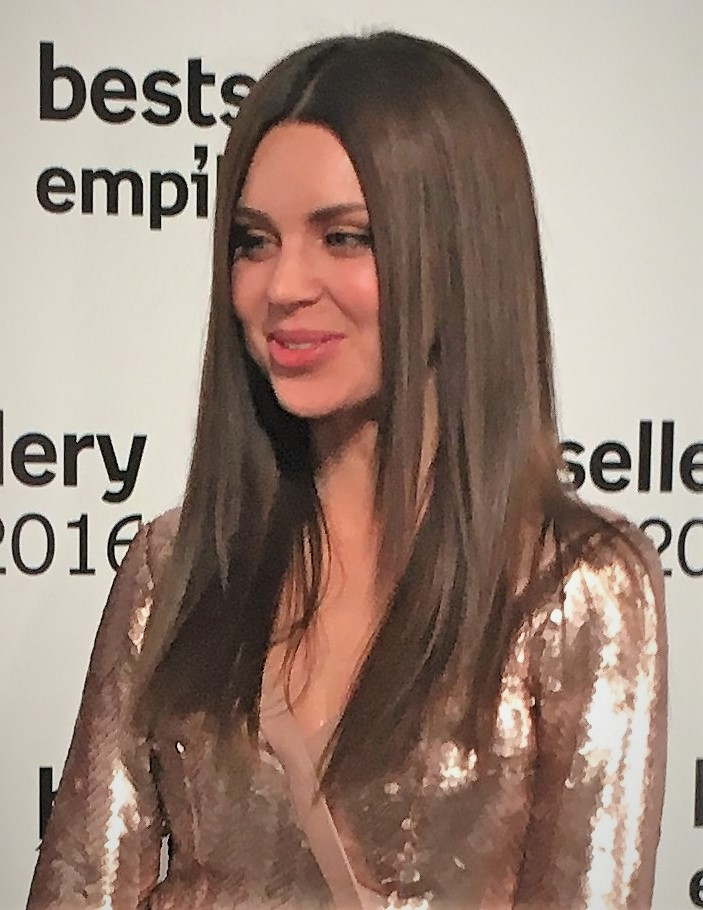
Miss Supranational 2011
Monika Lewczuk,
Poland

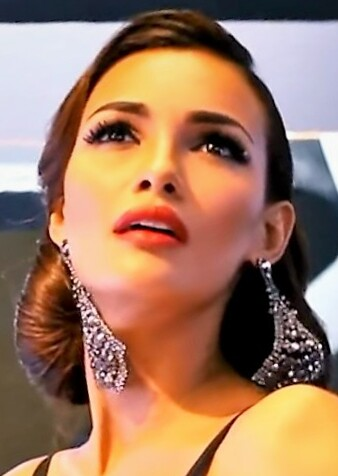
Miss Supranational 2010
Karina Pinilla,
Panama

== Mister Supranational ==
Mister Supranational
- Logo for Mister Supranational organization
- Type: International men's beauty pageant
- Headquarters: Panama City, Panama
- First edition: 2016
- Most recent edition: 2026
- Current titleholder: Pedro Cordero; Spain
- President: Gerhard Parzutka von Lipinski
- Language: English
- Website: www.mistersupranational.com

In 2016, the Polish businessman, producer, and international director of Miss Supranational, Gerhard Parzutka von Lipinski, founded the international male beauty contest, Mister Supranational, together with the Panamanian businesswoman Marcela Lobón, creator of WBA (World Beauty Association). The first edition of the contest was held on December 2, 2016, at the Municipal Sports and Recreation Center (MOSIR), in the city of Krynica-Zdrój, Poland, with the participation of 36 candidates from various countries around the world, with Diego Garcy from Mexico, the first winner of the contest.

Approximately 80 countries have participated in the contest, making it one of the most important male beauty pageants in the world.

=== Editions ===
The following is a list of Mister Supranational pageant edition and information.

Edition	Year	Date	Venue	Host country	Rep.
1st	2016	December 3	Stadion MOSiR, Krynica-Zdrój, Lesser Poland	Poland	
2nd	2017	December 2	Stadion MOSiR, Krynica-Zdrój, Lesser Poland	Poland	
3rd	2018	December 8	Stadion MOSiR, Krynica-Zdrój, Lesser Poland	Poland	
4th	2019	December 7	International Congress Centre, Katowice, Silesian	Poland	
2020 Cancelled due to the COVID-19 pandemic. (Note: The 2019 reigning titleholder Nate Crnkovich will remain Mister Supranational until 2021 due to the cancellation of the 2020 pageant because of the worldwide COVID-19 pandemic)
5th	2021	August 22	Strzelecki Park Amphitheater, Nowy Sącz, Lesser Poland	Poland	
6th	2022	July 16	Strzelecki Park Amphitheater, Nowy Sącz, Lesser Poland	Poland	
7th	2023	July 15	Strzelecki Park Amphitheater, Nowy Sącz, Lesser Poland	Poland	
8th	2024	July 4	Strzelecki Park Amphitheater, Nowy Sącz, Lesser Poland	Poland	
9th	2025	June 28	Strzelecki Park Amphitheater, Nowy Sącz, Lesser Poland	Poland	
10th	2026	August 1	Strzelecki Park Amphitheater, Nowy Sącz, Lesser Poland	Poland	

=== Gallery of winners ===
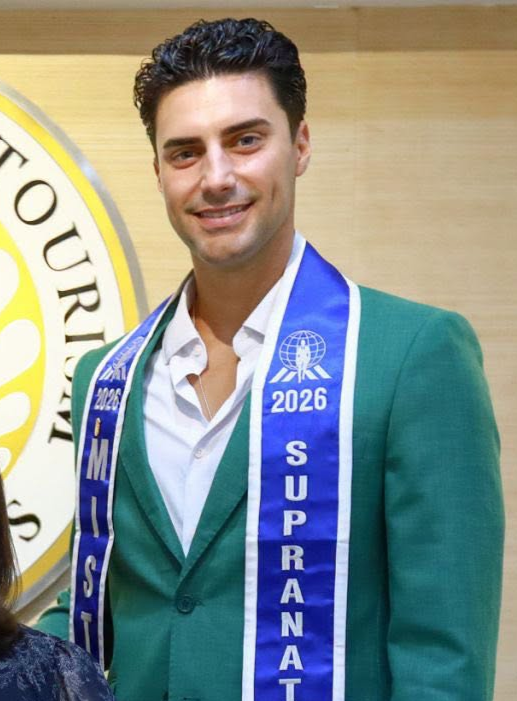
Mister Supranational 2026
Pedro Cordero,
Spain

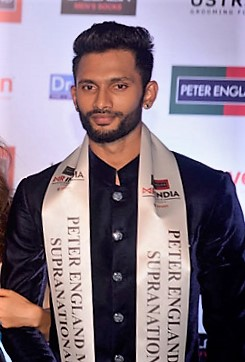
Mister Supranational 2018
Prathamesh Maulingkar,
India

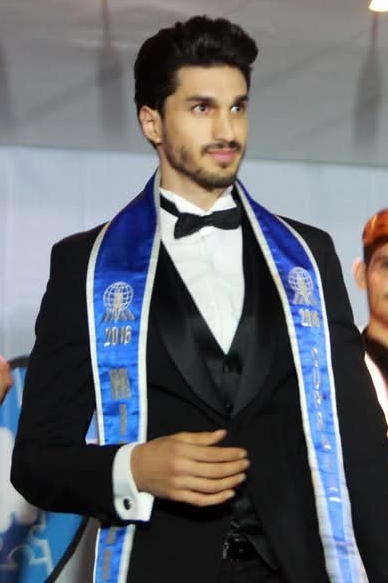
Mister Supranational 2016
Diego Garcy,
Mexico

== Titleholders ==
The following is a list of all Miss and Mister Supranational Organization titleholders from the establishment of each pageant until now.

Edition	Miss Supranational	National title	Country	Edition	Mister Supranational	National title	Country
2026	Katrina Llegado	The Miss Philippines Supranational	Philippines	2026	Pedro Cordero	Mister RNB España Supranacional	Spain
2025	Eduarda Braum	Miss Supranational Brazil	Brazil	2025	Swann Lavigne	Mister National France	France
2024	Harashta Haifa Zahra	Puteri Indonesia	Indonesia	2024	Fezile Mkhize	Mister Supranational South Africa	South Africa
2023	Andrea Aguilera	CNB Ecuador Supranational	Ecuador	2023	Iván Álvarez Guedes	Mister RNB España Supranacional	Spain
2022	Lalela Mswane	Miss South Africa	South Africa	2022	Luis Daniel Gálvez	Mister Cuba	Cuba
2021	Chanique Rabe	Miss Supranational Namibia	Namibia	2021	Varo Vargas	Mister Peru Supranational	Peru
2019	Anntonia Porsild	Miss Supranational Thailand	Thailand	2019	Nate Crnkovich	Mister Supranational USA	United States
2018	Valeria Vázquez	Miss Supranational Puerto Rico	Puerto Rico	2018	Prathamesh Maulingkar	Mister India Supranational	India
2017	Jenny Kim	Miss Supranational Korea	South Korea	2017	Gabriel Correa	Mister Venezuela	Venezuela
2016	Srinidhi Ramesh Shetty	Miss Diva Supranational	India	2016	Diego Garcy	Mister México	Mexico
2015	Stephanía Stegman	Miss Supranational Paraguay	Paraguay	↑ No Pageant Held (established in 2016)			
2014	Asha Bhat	Miss Diva Supranational	India	↑ No Pageant Held (established in 2016)			
2013	Mutya Datul	Binibining Pilipinas Supranational	Philippines	↑ No Pageant Held (established in 2016)			
2012	Katsiaryna Buraya	Miss Belarus Supranational	Belarus	↑ No Pageant Held (established in 2016)			
2011	Monika Lewczuk	Miss Polski Supranational	Poland	↑ No Pageant Held (established in 2016)			
2010	Karina Pinilla	Miss Supranational Panamá	Panama	↑ No Pageant Held (established in 2016)			
2009	Oksana Moria	Miss Supranational Ukraine	Ukraine	↑ No Pageant Held (established in 2016)			

== Supra Star Search ==
During a COVID-19 pandemic in 2020, Supra Star Search was introduced on 19 October 2020 as a virtual competition for men and women who want to compete for the Miss or Mister Supranational titles in countries with no national organizations.

=== Titleholders ===
Edition	Year	Supra Star Search		Represented	Notes	Placement at Supranational
1st	2020	Miss	Nyisha Tilus	Bahamas	Miss Supranational Bahamas 2021	Unplaced
1st	2020	Mister	Santosh Upadhyaya	Nepal	Mister Supranational Nepal 2021	3rd Runner-up
2nd	2022	Mister	Angel Olaya	Argentina	Mister Supranational Argentina 2022	Top 20

=== Other representatives ===
Year	Contestant		Represented	Placement at Supra Star Search	Notes	Placement at Supranational
2020	Miss	Sophie Marie Dunning	England	1st Runner-up	Later awarded as: Miss Supranational England 2021	Unplaced
2020	Miss	Melisha Lin	Malaysia	2nd Runner-up	Later won as: Miss Supranational Malaysia 2022	Top 24
2020	Mister	Theodore Bien-Aime	Haiti	1st Runner-up	Later awarded as: Mister Supranational Haiti 2021	Top 20
2022	Mister	RaÉd Fernandez Al-Zghayér	Jordan	Top 4	Later appointed as: Mister Supranational Philippines 2022	Top 20
2022	Mister	Marco Bauer	Germany	Top 15	Later appointed as: Mister Supranational Germany 2022	Unplaced

== See also ==
- List of beauty contests
