= Peter England =

International menswear brand

- Type: Public
- Industry: Textiles
- Founded: 1889, United Kingdom
- Headquarters: Mumbai, India
- Key people: Kumar Mangalam Birla (CEO and chairman)
- Products: Fabrics, denim
- Parent: Aditya Birla Fashion and Retail
- Website: peterengland.abfrl.in

Peter England is an international menswear brand based in India. Founded in 1889 in Ireland, it was acquired by Kumar Mangalam Birla's Aditya Birla Fashion and Retail Limited (ABFRL), a company of the Aditya Birla Group, in 2000. It produces suiting fabric, wool and wool-blended fabrics. According to the website of its parent company, as of 2014 it was the "largest menswear brand in India with over 10 million garments in sales".

== History ==
The Peter England brand was first formed in 1889 and the company was reputedly tasked with outfitting British soldiers during the Boer War. With a factory at Magherafelt in County Londonderry, as of the late 20th century it was owned by the British company Coats Viyella. The Magherafelt factory was subsequently closed, in 1992, resulting in the loss of several hundred jobs in the area.

The brand was launched in the Indian market in 1997, with bespoke and ready-made shirts. It was acquired in 2000 by the Aditya Birla Fashion and Retail company.

As of 2014, the brand was reputedly being sold from "over 600 EBOs" (exclusive brand outlet stores) in India.
