= List of Mister Supranational titleholders =

The following is a list of men who have won the Mister Supranational title.

== Mister Supranational titleholders ==
Year	Country/Territory	Titleholder	Age	Hometown	National Title	Location	Date	Entrants
2016	Mexico	Diego Garcy	26	Zapopan	Mister Supranational Mexico 2016	Krynica-Zdrój, Poland	December 3, 2016	36
2017	Venezuela	Gabriel Correa	27	Maracay	Mister Venezuela 2015	Krynica-Zdrój, Poland	December 2, 2017	34
2018	India	Prathamesh Maulingkar	27	Tivim	Mister India Supranational 2018	Krynica-Zdrój, Poland	December 8, 2018	39
2019	United States	Nate Crnkovich	24	Omaha	Mister USA 2019	Katowice, Poland	December 7, 2019	40
2020	No competition held due to the COVID-19 pandemic (Note: The 2019 titleholder Nate Crnkovich reigned Mister Supranational until 2021 due to the cancellation of the 2020 pageant because of the worldwide COVID-19 pandemic)							
2021	Peru	Varo Vargas	31	Lima	Mister Peru Supranational 2021	Nowy Sącz, Poland	August 22, 2021	34
2022	Cuba	Luis Daniel Gálvez	27	Havana	Mister Cuba 2022	Nowy Sącz, Poland	July 16, 2022	34
2023	Spain	Iván Álvarez Guedes	30	Pontevedra	Mister RNB España Supranational 2022	Nowy Sącz, Poland	July 15, 2023	34
2024	South Africa	Fezile Mkhize	33	Bloemfontein	Mister Supranational South Africa 2024	Nowy Sącz, Poland	July 4, 2024	36
2025	France	Swann Lavigne	25	Taulignan	Mister National France 2024	Nowy Sącz, Poland	June 28, 2025	39
2026	Spain	Pedro Cordero	23	Cártama	Mister RNB España Supranational 2026	Nowy Sącz, Poland	August 1, 2026	41

=== League tables ===
==== Countries by number of wins ====
Country or territory	Titles	Years
Spain	2	2023, 2026
France	1	2025
South Africa	1	2024
Cuba	1	2022
Peru	1	2021
United States	1	2019
India	1	2018
Venezuela	1	2017
Mexico	1	2016

==== Continents by number of wins ====
Continent or region	Titles	Years
Americas	5	2016, 2017, 2019, 2021, 2022
Europe	3	2023, 2025, 2026
Africa	1	2024
Asia	1	2018
Oceania	0	

== Gallery of winners ==
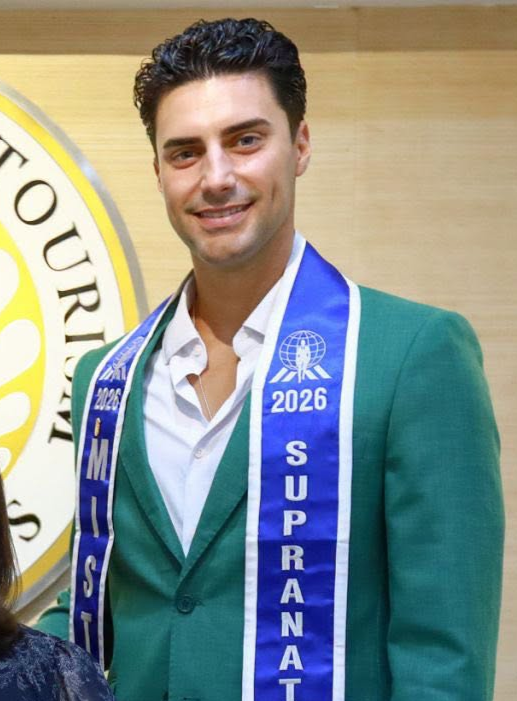
Mister Supranational 2026
Pedro Cordero,
Spain

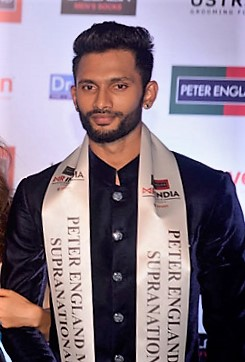
Mister Supranational 2018
Prathamesh Maulingkar,
India

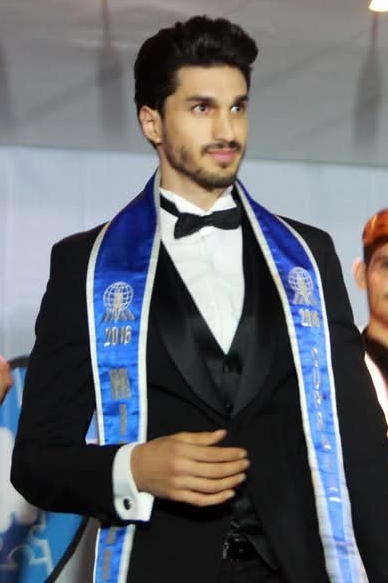
Mister Supranational 2016
Diego Garcy,
Mexico

== Table of Mister Supranational runners-up and finalists ==
Year	Mister Supranational	Runners-up				Ref.
Year	Mister Supranational	First	Second	Third	Fourth	Ref.
2026	**Spain**; Pedro Cordero	South Africa; Marcél Roux	China; Daniel Jiawei Li	Dominican Republic; Ramón Alcántara	Mexico; Gabriel Castañeda	
2025	**France**; Swann Lavigne	Curaçao; Zuemerik Veeris	Mexico; Mauricio Calvo	Nigeria; Michael Mazi-Michael	Philippines; Kenneth Cabungcal	
2024	**South Africa**; Fezile Mkhize	Netherlands; Casey De Vries	Philippines; Brandon Espiritu	Venezuela; Marcos De Freitas	Laos; Sanonh Maniphonh	
2023	**Spain**; Iván Álvarez	Brazil; Henrique Martins	Netherlands; Luca Derin	South Korea; Lee Yong–woo	Cameroon; Daniel Mbouda	
2022	**Cuba**; Luis Daniel Gálvez	Indonesia; Matthew Gilbert Wibowo	Greece; Leonidas Amfilochios	Mexico; Moisés Peñaloza	Puerto Rico; Heriberto Rivera	
2021	**Peru**; Varo Vargas	Togo; Abdel Kacem Tefridj	Venezuela; William Badell	Nepal; Santosh Upadhyaya	Spain; Lucas Muñoz-Alonso	
2019	**United States**; Nate Crnkovich	Brazil; Ítalo Cerqueira	Peru; Alonzo Martinez Vivanco	Poland; Tomasz Zarzycki	Venezuela; Leonardo Carrero	
2018	**India**; Prathamesh Maulingkar	Poland; Jakub Kucner	Brazil; Samuel Costa	Thailand; Kevin Dasom	Netherlands; Ennio Fafieanie	
2017	**Venezuela**; Gabriel Correa	Spain; Alejandro Cifo	Brazil; Matheus Song	Slovakia; Michal Gajdosech	Mexico; Hector Javier Parga	
2016	**Mexico**; Diego Garcy	Belarus; Sergey Bindalov	India; Jitesh Thakur	Brazil; Bruno Vanin	Romania; Catalin Brinza	

=== Finalists ranking ===
Rank	Country/Territory	Mister Supranational (1st place)	1st Runner-up (2nd place)	2nd Runner-up (3rd place)	3rd Runner-up (4th place)	4th Runner-up (5th place)	Total
1	Spain	2 (2023, 2026)	1 (2017)	×	×	1 (2021)	4
2	South Africa	1 (2024)	1 (2026)	×	×	×	2
3	Mexico	1 (2016)	×	1 (2025)	1 (2022)	2 (2017, 2026)	5
4	Venezuela	1 (2017)	×	1 (2021)	1 (2024)	1 (2019)	4
5	Peru	1 (2021)	×	1 (2019)	×	×	2
5	India	1 (2018)	×	1 (2016)	×	×	2
6	France	1 (2025)	×	×	×	×	1
6	Cuba	1 (2022)	×	×	×	×	1
6	United States	1 (2019)	×	×	×	×	1
7	Brazil	×	2 (2019, 2023)	2 (2017, 2018)	1 (2016)	×	5
8	Netherlands	×	1 (2024)	1 (2023)	×	1 (2018)	3
9	Poland	×	1 (2018)	×	1 (2019)	×	2
10	Curaçao	×	1 (2025)	×	×	×	1
10	Indonesia	×	1 (2022)	×	×	×	1
10	Togo	×	1 (2021)	×	×	×	1
10	Belarus	×	1 (2016)	×	×	×	1
11	Philippines	×	×	1 (2024)	×	1 (2025)	2
12	China	×	×	1 (2026)	×	×	1
12	Greece	×	×	1 (2022)	×	×	1
13	Dominican Republic	×	×	×	1 (2026)	×	1
13	Nigeria	×	×	×	1 (2025)	×	1
13	South Korea	×	×	×	1 (2023)	×	1
13	Nepal	×	×	×	1 (2021)	×	1
13	Thailand	×	×	×	1 (2018)	×	1
13	Slovakia	×	×	×	1 (2017)	×	1
14	Laos	×	×	×	×	1 (2024)	1
14	Cameroon	×	×	×	×	1 (2023)	1
14	Puerto Rico	×	×	×	×	1 (2022)	1
14	Romania	×	×	×	×	1 (2016)	1
**Rank**	Total	**10**	**10**	**10**	**10**	**10**	**50**

The country/territory who assumed a position is indicated in bold
The country/territory who was dethroned, resigned or originally held the position is indicated in striketrough
The country/territory who was dethroned, resigned or originally held the position but was not replaced is indicated underlined

== Mister Supranational continent ==
Year	Mister Supranational Asia	Mister Supranational Oceania	Mister Supranational America	Mister Supranational Europe	Mister Supranational Africa	Mister Supranational Caribbean
Year	Mister Supranational Asia-Pacific		Mister Supranational America	Mister Supranational Europe	Mister Supranational Africa	Mister Supranational Caribbean
2016	Jitesh Thakur; India	Fletcher Barnes; Hawaii	Diego Garcy; Mexico	Sergey Bindalov; Belarus	Mohamed Medhat; Egypt	Not awarded
2017	Altamash Faraz; India	Bruno Charley; New Caledonia	Cody Ondrick; USA	Justin Axiak; Malta	Tewolde Kiflom; Ethiopia	Not awarded
2018	Tymeron Carvalho; Sri Lanka	Kevin Aubry; New Caledonia	Nicholas Kotselas; USA	Jan Palko; Slovak Republic	Kwassy Adjamah; Togo	Daniel Sicheneder; Dominican Republic
2019	Varum Verma; India	Manutea Benet; New Caledonia	Nicolás Asanz; Ecuador	Jan Solfronk; Czech Republic	Rushil Jina; South Africa	Ángel Holguín; Dominican Republic
2021	Rahul Rajasekharan; India		Gustavo Rosas; Mexico	Raffael Fiedler; Malta	Abu Bakish Tarawalie; Sierra Leone	Iván Oleaga; Dominican Republic
2022	Bùi Xuân Đạt; Vietnam		Guilherme Werner; Brazil	Pierre Bondon; France	Jean-Louis Knouwds; Namibia	Wynter Mason; Trinidad & Tobago
2023	Nathanon Narathanyawirun; Thailand		Luis Cuadra; Mexico	Jakub Vitek; Czech Republic	Tylo Ribeiro; South Africa	Keathon Yallery; Trinidad & Tobago
2024	Đỗ Quang Tuyển; Vietnam		Rafael Rapelo; Colombia	Patryk Karbowski; Poland	Uthman Issa Bangura; Sierra Leone	Bray Vargas; Dominican Republic
2025	Mustanir Afif; Indonesia		Víctor Battista; Venezuela	Tomas Haring; Czech Republic	Luca Pontiggia; South Africa	Anthony Delgado; Puerto Rico
2026	Jack Titus; Thailand		Danton Miguel; Brazil	Daniel Zedníček; Czech Republic	Luay Latif Kalisilira; Zambia	Leonardo Leça; Curaçao

== See also ==
- List of Miss Supranational titleholders
- List of Miss Supranational countries
