= Mister Jalisco 2026 =

Beauty pageant

- Date: December 13, 2025
- Presenters: Jaime Núñez; Daniela Vázquez
- Venue: Auditorio Nexus, Guadalajara, Jalisco.
- Broadcaster: Facebook
- Entrants: 5
- Placements: 5
- Winner: Gabriel Castañeda; Guadalajara

Mister Jalisco 2026 was a male beauty pageant of the Mister México contest, held at the Auditorio Nexus of Guadalajara, Jalisco, on December 13, 2025. Five contestants competed for the title. At the conclusion of the final night of competition Gabriel Castañeda of Guadalajara was crowned the winner. Castañeda was crowned by Luis Cuadra, Mister Jalisco 2023 and Mister Supranational México 2023.

== Results ==
=== Placements ===
Final results	Contestant
Mister Jalisco 2026	Guadalajara – Gabriel Castañeda
1st Runner-up	Teuchitlán – Andrés Gómez Cortés
2nd Runner-up	San Julián – Gustavo Alejandro Padilla
3rd Runner-up	San Marcos – Javier Miranda Venegas
4th Runner-up	Zapotlán el Grande – Ivan Valencia

=== Special Award ===
Award	Contestant
Top Model	San Julián – Gustavo Alejandro Padilla
Best Body	Guadalajara – Gabriel Castañeda
Social Media	Teuchitlán – Andrés Gómez Cortés

== Contestants ==
Hometown	Candidate	Age
Guadalajara	Gabriel Castañeda	34
Teuchitlán	Andrés Gómez Cortés	27
San Marcos	Javier Miranda Venegas	23
San Julián	Gustavo Alejandro Padilla	32
Zapotlán el Grande	Ivan Valencia	32
