= Mister Panamá =

National male beauty pageant competition in Panama

- Formation: 1997
- Type: Beauty Pageant
- Headquarters: Panama City
- Location: Panama
- Members: Mister World; Manhunt International; Mister International; Man of the World; Mister Universe Model; Mr. Tourism International
- Official language: Spanish
- Agency: Panama Talents
- Website: www.misspanama.com.pa

Mister Panamá is a men's pageant held in Panama. The winner and finalists from the contest go on to represent Panama in many international pageants.

== Organization ==
The Mister Panamá pageant was started under the guardianship of the agency Panama Talents with the intent of creating a men's contest with the same discipline, quality and success of its feminine counterpart.Although currently the contest is carried out by the Mister Panama Oficial Organization who is in charge of choosing the representatives heading to the grand slam contests

== Titleholders ==
Year	Mister Panamá
2001	Junior Dean Kelly
2002	Christian Herrera
2003	Diego Alejandro Cedeño
2004	Harry Duncan
2005	Jaime Enrique Beitia Correa
2006	Jaime Valdez
2007	Jorge Prosperi
2008	Alexis Ríos
2009	Ryan Oliver dethroned
2009	Diomedes Bustavino
2010	Carlos Rodríguez
2011	Jafeth Gutierrez
2012	Henry Rodriguez Rivera
2013	Sergio Isaac López Goti
2014	Arian Alexis López
2015	Julian Javier Torres

== List of Mister Panamá at International pageants ==
=== Mister International ===
- : Winner
- : Runner-up
- : Finalist or Semifinalist
- : Special Award Winner

Year	Mister Panamá	Placement	Special Awards
2003	Rodrigo Díaz	4th Runner-up	Mister Elegance
2010	Francisco Navarro Miranda	Unplaced	
2011	Jafeth Gutierrez	Unplaced	
2013	Sergio Lópes Gotti	Unplaced	Best National Costume
2014	Arián Alexis López Abrego	Withdrew	
2015	Julian Torres	3rd Runner-up	
2016	Husam Ahmad Saavedra	Withdrew	
2017	Husam Ahmad Saavedra	Unplaced	
2018	Juan Ángel Barragán	Top 10	
2019	Efraín Enrique Valenzuela	Withdrew	
2022	Daniel Andrian Morán	Unplaced	
2023	Kevin Daniel Varela	Withdrew	
2024	Mario Bianco	Unplaced	
2025	Carlos Díaz	Unplaced	

=== Manhunt International ===
- : Winner
- : Runner-up
- : Finalist or Semifinalist
- : Special Award Winner

Year	Mister Panamá	Placement	Special Awards
1997	Francisco Jiménez Mery	Top 10	
1998	Angel Demelos	Unplaced	
2002	Christian Herrera	Unplaced	
2005	Jaime Enrique Beitia Correa	Top 15	Manhunt Americas
2006	Harry Duncan	Top 15	
2007	Orlando Mendienta	Top 15	
2008	Anthony Warren	Top 15	
2010	Enrique Lukowsky Sorto	Top 16	
2011	Juan Diego Sucre	Withdrew	
2012	Henry Rodriguez Rivera	Unplaced	
2018	Sergio Lópes Gotti	Withdrew	
2022	Jaime Garcia	Unplaced	
2024	Rubén Salcedo	Withdrew	
2025	Roderick Alberto Cruz	Top 20	

=== Mister Supranational ===
- : Winner
- : Runner-up
- : Finalist or Semifinalist
- : Special Award Winner

Year	Mister Panamá	Placement	Special Awards
2016	Michael Piggott	Top 10	
2017	Alan Valdés	Top 20	
2018	Ryan Stone	Top 20	
2019	Omar Collado	Withdrew	
2021	Luis Baloyes	Unplaced	
2022	Elvis Hidalgo	Unplaced	
2023	Mario Bianco	Top 20	

=== Mister Global ===
- : Winner
- : Runner-up
- : Finalist or Semifinalist
- : Special Award Winner

Year	Mister Panamá	Placement	Special Awards
2016	Jesús Linares	Unplaced	
2017	Arturo Lugo	Top 16	
2018	Angel Josue Tello	Withdrew	
2019	Kenny Guerra	Unplaced	Best in Swimwear
2021	Javier Vasquez	Unplaced	
2022	Carlos Córdova	Unplaced	
2023	Raúl Pinto	Top 15	
2024	Gilberto Peñalba	Unplaced	
2025	Frank Mendez	Unplaced	

=== Mister World ===
- : Winner
- : Runner-up
- : Finalist or Semifinalist
- : Special Award Winner

Year	Mister Panamá	Placement	Special Awards
2007	Diego Cedeño de Obaldía	Unplaced	
2010	Héctor Villarreal Franco	Unplaced	
2016	Sergio Lópes Gotti	Unplaced	
2019	Algis González Medina	Unplaced	
2024	Aarón Guerra Hernandéz	Withdrew	

=== Man of the World ===
- : Winner
- : Runner-up
- : Finalist or Semifinalist
- : Special Award Winner

Year	Mister Panamá	Placement	Special Awards
2017	Alejandro Castroverde	Withdrew	
2022	Alberto Henriquez	Withdrew	
2024	Cristian Jaramillo	Withdrew	
2025	Sworman Delgado	4th Runner-up	(gold) Best in Formal Wear; (gold) Mister Photogenic; (silver) Best in Arrival Outfit
2026	Saul Samudio	Unplaced	(silver) Mister Photogenic; (bronze) Best in National Costume

=== Mister Universe Model ===
- : Winner
- : Runner-up
- : Finalist or Semifinalist
- : Special Award Winner

Year	Mister Panamá	Placement	Special Awards
2008	Patrick Cobbett	4th Runner up	Mister Elegance
2009	Jorge Prosperi	Top 15	Best Catwalk
Did not compete between 2010 and 2011
2012	William Miranda	Unplaced	Best National Costume
2013	Arnulfo Rosario	Unplaced	
2014	Claudio Hawkins	Unplaced	
2015	Juan Diego Sucre	Unplaced	
2016	Marlon Stiven Polo Anaya	Mister Universe Model 2016	Best National Costume
2017	Idelfonso Castillo	Unplaced	
2018	Edwin Ayrtom Solís Araúz	Unplaced	

=== Mr. Tourism International ===
- : Winner
- : Runner-up
- : Finalist or Semifinalist
- : Special Award Winner

Year	Mister Panamá	Placement	Special Awards
2001	Jorge Herrera	Top 5	Mister Talent
2002	Junior Dean Kelly	Mr. Tourism International 2002	
2010	Yader Ibarra	1st Runner-up	
Did not compete between 2012 and 2013
2014	Adrián Arturo Pérez	Top 5	

=== Mister Grand Internacional ===
- : Winner
- : Runner-up
- : Finalist or Semifinalist
- : Special Award Winner

Year	Mister Panamá	Placement	Special Awards
2018	Elvis Franceschi	Unplaced	
2021	Abdiel González	Top 10	Best National Costume
2023	Carlos Pellicer	Unplaced	

=== Caballero Universal ===
- : Winner
- : Runner-up
- : Finalist or Semifinalist
- : Special Award Winner

Year	Mister Panamá	Placement	Special Awards
2022	Israel Guerra	Top 10	

== See also ==
- Señorita Panamá
- Manhunt International
- Mister International
- Mister World
