= Mister México 2022 =

3rd edition of Mister México

- Date: 12 June 2025
- Presenters: Ady Moss; Lezly Díaz
- Venue: Teatro Galerías, Guadalajara, Jalisco
- Broadcaster: MVS TV • Telemax
- Entrants: 31
- Placements: 12
- Winner: Moisés Peñaloza Tamaulipas

Mister México 2022 is the third edition of the contest Mister México, held on June 12, in Guadalajara, Jalisco. Thirty one candidates from the Republic of Mexico will compete to get the national title.

At the end of the event, Alejandro García crowned his successor Moisés Peñaloza of Tamaulipas as Mister Supranational México 2022. Peñaloza represented Mexico at the Mister Supranational 2022 competition held on 16 July in Nowy Sącz, Poland, where he finished as the 3rd runner-up, marking Mexico's second consecutive placement.

== Results ==
=== Placements ===
Color keys

- Declared as winner
- Ended as runner-up or top 5/6 qualification
- Ended as one of the finalists or semifinalists
- Ended did not place

=== Mister México 2022 ===
Placement	Contestant	International Placement
Mister Supranational México 2022	Tamaulipas – Moisés Peñaloza	3rd Runner-Up – Mister Supranational 2022
1st runner-up	Coahuila – Jairo Zait Villa Reza	
2nd runner-up	Veracruz – Felipe López Olivares	
3rd runner-up	Tlaxcala – Francisco Flores Zuñiga	
4th runner-up	Jalisco – Jesús Eloi Esparza	
Top 12	Chiapas – Francisco Iturralde; Durango – Ernesto Barraza; Estado de México – Ivan Varas Anguiano; Morelos – Alonso Molina; Oaxaca – Stephen Rivas; Querétaro – Isaac Zuñiga Campos; Yucatán – Javier Emmanuel Barrera	

=== Awards ===
Category	Awards	Winner
MAIN AWARDS	Mister Top Model	Tamaulipas – Moisés Peñaloza
MAIN AWARDS	Sports Challenge	Oaxaca – Stephen Rivas
MAIN AWARDS	Mister Talent	Veracruz – Felipe Flores Olivares
MAIN AWARDS	English Challenge	Durango – Ernesto Barraza
MAIN AWARDS	Multimedia Challenge	Chiapas – Francisco Iturralde
SPECIAL AWARDS	Fitness Body	Morelos – Alonso Molina
SPECIAL AWARDS	Mister Photogenic	Coahuila – Jairo Zait Villa Reza
SPECIAL AWARDS	Mister Congeniality	Tamaulipas – Moisés Peñaloza
SPECIAL AWARDS	Historia de México y Cultura General	Querétaro – Isaac Zuñiga Campos

== Official Delegates ==
31 candidates run to win the title.

State	Candidate	Age	Height
Aguascalientes	Alejandro Hernández	23	1.80 m (5 ft 11 in)
Baja California	Carlos Beltrán González	26	1.86 m (6 ft 1 in)
Baja California Sur	Felipe Sandez	21	1.90 m (6 ft 3 in)
Campeche	Merardo Hernández Estrada	25	1.82 m (5 ft 11 1/2 in)
Chiapas	Francisco Iturralde	25	1.84 m (6 ft 1/2 in)
Chihuahua	Javier Flores	29	1.84 m (6 ft 1/2 in)
Ciudad de México	Mario Alejandro Sánchez	24	1.84 m (6 ft 1/2 in)
Coahuila	Jairo Zait Villa Reza	30	1.90 m (6 ft 3 in)
Colima	Christian Cardenas Robles	30	1.82 m (5 ft 11 1/2 in)
Durango	Ernesto Barraza	32	1.84 m (6 ft 1/2 in)
Estado de México	Iván Varas Anguiano	25	1.89 m (6 ft 2 1/2 in)
Guanajuato	José Miguel Naveja	23	1.96 m (6 ft 5 in)
Guerrero	Cristian Mandujano	20	1.83 m (6 ft 0 in)
Hidalgo	Adrian González Téllez	24	1.85 m (6 ft 1 in)
Jalisco	Jesús Eloi Esparza	25	1.92 m (6 ft 3 1/2 in)
Michoacán	Alexis Guerrero Lozano	29	1.90 m (6 ft 3 in)
Morelos	Alonso Molina	24	1.80 m (5 ft 11 in)
Nayarit	César Armando Nuñez	27	1.85 m (6 ft 1 in)
Nuevo León	Mario António Falcone	22	1.80 m (5 ft 11 in)
Oaxaca	Stephen Rivas	21	1.81 m (5 ft 11 1/2 in)
Puebla	Diego Yael Ibarra	30	1.85 m (6 ft 1 in)
Querétaro	Isaac Zuñiga Campos	23	1.83 m (6 ft 0 in)
Quintana Roo	Armando Flores	26	1.84 m (6 ft 1/2 in)
San Luis Potosí	Vicente Martínez Oliva	23	1.83 m (6 ft 0 in)
Sinaloa	Hugo Alberto Lugo Castró	25	1.85 m (6 ft 1 in)
Sonora	Fernando Munguía	30	1.86 m (6 ft 1 in)
Tabasco	Zaul Nevarez	27	1.83 m (6 ft 0 in)
Tamaulipas	Moisés Peñaloza	30	1.85 m (6 ft 1 in)
Tlaxcala	Francisco Zuñiga	30	1.84 m (6 ft 1/2 in)
Veracruz	Felipe López Olivares	32	1.91 m (6 ft 3 in)
Yucatán	Javier Emmanuel Barrera	26	1.78 m (5 ft 10 in)
Zacatecas	Raúl Esparza	Did not compete	
