= Mister México 2025 =

6th edition of Mister México

- Date: 8 February 2025
- Presenters: Yoana Gutiérrez; Alejandro García
- Venue: Teatro Francisco Javier Clavijero, Puerto de Veracruz, Veracruz
- Broadcaster: MVS TV • Telemax
- Entrants: 32
- Placements: 16
- Winner: Mauricio Calvo Tabasco

Mister México 2025 was the sixth edition of the Mister México contest, held on 8 February in Puerto de Veracruz, Veracruz. Thirty-two candidates from across Mexico competed to win the national title.

At the end of the event, Zait Reza crowned his successor Mauricio Calvo of Tabasco as Mister Supranational México 2025. Calvo represented Mexico at the Mister Supranational 2025 competition held on 28 July in Nowy Sącz, Poland, where he finished as the 2nd runner-up. This marked Mexico’s fifth consecutive placement and their best result since 2022.

== Results ==
=== Placements ===
Color keys

- Declared as winner
- Ended as runner-up or top 5/6 qualification
- Ended as one of the finalists or semifinalists
- Ended did not place

=== Mister México 2025 ===
Final results	Candidates	International Placement
Mister Supranational México 2025	Tabasco – Mauricio Calvo	2nd Runner-up – Mister Supranational 2025
1st Runner-up	Oaxaca – Dustin Ozua	
2nd Runner-up	Mexico City – Alejandro Santana	
3rd Runner-up	Chiapas – Gerardo Bonilla Díaz	
4th Runner-up	Nuevo León – Nahum Molina	
Top 10	Coahuila – Manuel Duarte López; Estado de México – René Fosado; Guanajuato – Carlos Omar Sánchez; Sonora – Oscar Cruz; Yucatán – Fernando Iriarte Ibarra	
Top 16	Aguascalientes – Ángel Durón; Campeche – Gustavo Manuel; Colima – Alan García; Durango - Alejandro Herrera Alvarado; Querétaro – Armando Andrade; Tlaxcala – Sergio Orencio	

=== Awards ===
Category	Awards	Winner
MAIN AWARDS	Mister Top Model	Mexico City – Alejandro Santana
MAIN AWARDS	Sports Challenge	Oaxaca – Dustin Ozua
MAIN AWARDS	Mister Talent	Colima – Alan García
MAIN AWARDS	English Challenge	Aguascalientes – Ángel Durón
MAIN AWARDS	Supra Chat	Querétaro – Armando Andrade
SPECIAL AWARDS	Fitness Body	Sonora – Oscar Cruz
SPECIAL AWARDS	Hombres de Acción	Tamaulipas - Alejandro Sánchez Martínez
SPECIAL AWARDS	Mister Photogenic	Tabasco – Mauricio Calvo
SPECIAL AWARDS	Mister Congeniality	Campeche – Gustavo Manuel

== Official Delegates ==
32 candidates run to win the title.

State	Candidate	Age	Height
Aguascalientes	Angel Durón	23	1.80 m (5 ft 11 in)
Baja California	Alberto Arias	33	1.92 m (6 ft 3 1/2 in)
Baja California Sur	Noel Abraham Romero Cosio	21	1.85 m (6 ft 1 in)
Campeche	Gustavo Manuel	33	1.81 m (5 ft 11 1/2 in)
Chiapas	Gerardo Bonilla Díaz	33	1.85 m (6 ft 1 in)
Chihuahua	Gerardo Mendoza Betancourt	25	1.82 m (5 ft 11 1/2 in)
Ciudad de México	Alejandro Santana	30	1.86 m (6 ft 1 in)
Coahuila	Manuel Duarte López	28	1.85 m (6 ft 1 in)
Colima	Alan García	23	1.78 m (5 ft 10 in)
Durango	Alejandro Herrera Alvarado	23	1.84 m (6 ft 1/2 in)
Estado de México	René Fosado	28	1.80 m (5 ft 11 in)
Guanajuato	Carlos Omar Sánchez	30	1.91 m (6 ft 3 in)
Guerrero	Adrian Quihuis	25	1.78 m (5 ft 10 in)
Hidalgo	Carlos Ávila	26	1.87 m (6 ft 1 1/2 in)
Jalisco	Jair Cano De Santos	23	1.80 m (5 ft 11 in)
Michoacán	Getzemani Pantoja	25	1.81 m (5 ft 11 1/2 in)
Morelos	Amel Jauregui	23	1.83 m (6 ft 0 in)
Nayarit	Kevin Vicente Trejo	25	1.83 m (6 ft 0 in)
Nuevo León	Nahum Molina	21	1.90 m (6 ft 3 in)
Oaxaca	Dustin Ozua	29	1.95 m (6 ft 5 in)
Puebla	Mauro Montoya Hernández	19	1.82 m (5 ft 11 1/2 in)
Querétaro	Armando Andrade	33	1.80 m (5 ft 11 in)
Quintana Roo	Felipe López Olivares	34	1.91 m (6 ft 3 in)
San Luis Potosí	Giuseppe Loredo Hernandez	26	1.87 m (6 ft 1 1/2 in)
Sinaloa	Alonso Gastelum	28	1.81 m (5 ft 11 1/2 in)
Sonora	Oscar Cruz	23	1.84 m (6 ft 1/2 in)
Tabasco	Mauricio Calvo	28	1.93 m (6 ft 4 in)
Tamaulipas	Alejandro Sánchez Martínez	30	—
Tlaxcala	Sergio Orencio	28	1.80 m (5 ft 11 in)
Veracruz	Omar Silva	31	1.85 m (6 ft 1 in)
Yucatán	Fernando Iriarte Ibarra	26	1.80 m (5 ft 11 in)
Zacatecas	José Angel González	24	1.78 m (5 ft 10 in)

Notes

- Felipe López Olivares placed as Top 17 in Mister Model International 2025 in Barranquilla, Colombia.
- Armando Andrade placed as Top 17 in Mister Tourism World 2022 in Nueva Ecija, Philippines.
- Manuel Duarte López placed as Top 16 in Mister Global 2019 in Bangkok, Thailand.
