= Diego Garcy =

Mexican model

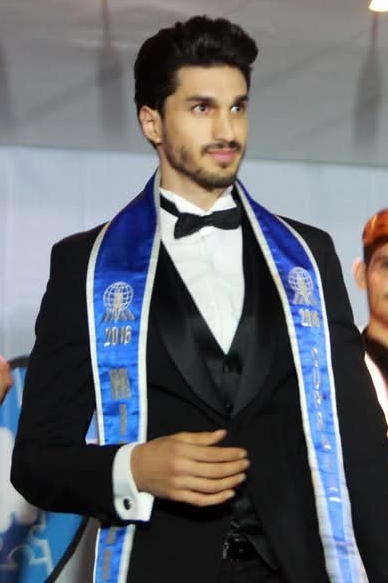
- Garcy in 2017
- Born: Diego Armando García Merino; December 26, 1990 (age 35); Zapopan, Jalisco, Mexico
- Occupation: Model
- Height: 1.89 m (6 ft 2 1/2 in)
- Title: Mister Supranational 2016

Diego Armando García Merino (born December 26, 1990), popularly known as Diego Garcy, is a Mexican model renowned for his extensive career in modeling competitions. He became the first winner of the Mister Supranational title.

== Life and career ==
=== Model ===
Garcy built his career in Mexico before moving into the international fashion circuit. His agencies included Citro Modelos and Avenue Modelos in Guadalajara, New Icon Model Management in New York, and Independent Model Management in Milan. Contemporary coverage specifically describes him as an international model working between the Mexican and European fashion markets. He was particularly associated with Milan Fashion Week and New York Fashion Week. In an interview, he described Milan as an important goal in his career and spoke about trying to establish himself sufficiently to obtain work with major Italian fashion houses.

=== Pageantry ===
In 2016, Garcy represented Mexico at the Mister Supranational pageant in Krynica-Zdrój, Poland. During the competition, he won the Mister Supranational Americas and Mister Elegance award. Garcy become the first ever winner of the Mister Supranational and winning the first title for the country.

Awards and achievements
Preceded by First	Mister Supranational; 2016	Succeeded by (Venezuela) Gabriel Correa
Preceded by First	Mister Supranational Americas; 2016	Succeeded by (United States) Cody Ondrick
Preceded by First	Mister Supranational Mexico; 2016	Succeeded by Héctor Javier Parga
