= Mister National France 2024 =

20th Mister National France competition

- Date: March 16, 2024
- Venue: Les Ateliers Magiques de Dani Lary, Grande Rue in Barbières, Drôme, France
- Entrants: 21
- Placements: 5
- Winner: Swann Lavigne; Rhône-Alpes

Mister National France 2024 was the 20th edition of the Mister National France pageant. The competition was held on March 16, 2024 at Les Ateliers Magiques de Dani Lary, Grande Rue in Barbières, Drôme Lucas Schlachter of Lorraine crowned Swann Lavigne of Rhône-Alpes as her successor at the end of the event. He represented France at Mister International 2024, placing in the top 15 and Mister Supranational 2025, winning the first title for the country.

== Results ==
=== Placements ===
- Declared as winner
- Ended as runner-up or top 5/6 qualification
- Ended as one of the finalists or semifinalists

Placement	Contestant	International Placement
Mister National France 2024	Rhône-Alpes – Swann Lavigne	Winner – Mister Supranational 2025
Mister National France 2024	Rhône-Alpes – Swann Lavigne	Top 15 – Mister International 2024
1st Runner-up	Picardie – Thomas Elie	
2nd Runner-up (Mister Global France)	Languedoc – Julien Didier	Top 20 – Mister Global 2024
3rd Runner-up	Midi-Pyrénées – Gabin Sechaud	
4th Runner-up	Provence – Christian Biette	

== Contestants ==
21 contestants competed:

- Aquitaine – Jeff Hudson
- Auvergne – Matheo Pontrucher
- Bretagne – Gwen Jegouzo
- Provence – Christian Biette
- Guadeloupe – Kenny Laurencin
- Guyane – Nicolas Mouchez
- Languedoc – Julien Didier
- Lorraine – Maxime Poirot
- Martinique – Jeeday
- Mayotte – Nimka Wayne
- Midi-Pyrénées – Gabin Sechaud
- Monaco – Tanguy Le Clerc
- Nord-Pas-de-Calais – Kamel Bakiri
- Normandy – Kylian MSX
- New Caledonia – Muavaka Foikaloni
- Pays de la Loire – Jordan
- Picardie – Thomas Elie
- Provence – Alexis Maniga
- Réunion – Quentin dijoux
- Rhône-Alpes – Swann Lavigne
- Roussillon – Maxence Gonzalez
