= Mister México 2023 =

4th edition of Mister México

- Date: 27 May 2023
- Presenters: Moisés Peñaloza
- Venue: Teatro Francisco Javier Clavijero, Puerto de Veracruz, Veracruz
- Broadcaster: MVS TV • Telemax
- Entrants: 32
- Placements: 16
- Winner: Luis Cuadra Jalisco

Mister México 2023 was the fourth edition of the Mister México contest, held on 27 May in Puerto de Veracruz, Veracruz. Thirty-two candidates from across Mexico competed to win the national title.

At the end of the event, Moisés Peñaloza crowned his successor Luis Cuadra of Jalisco as Mister Supranational México 2023. Cuadra represented Mexico at the Mister Supranational 2023 competition held on 15 July in Nowy Sącz, Poland, where he finished in the Top 10, marking Mexico’s third consecutive placement.

== Results ==
=== Placements ===
Color keys

- Declared as winner
- Ended as runner-up or top 5/6 qualification
- Ended as one of the finalists or semifinalists
- Ended did not place

=== Mister México 2023 ===
Final results	Candidates	International Placement
Mister Supranational México 2023	Jalisco – Luis Cuadra	Top 10 – Mister Supranational 2023
1st Runner-up	Coahuila – Jonathan Hurtado Zúñiga	
2nd Runner-up	Yucatán – Mauricio Cuevas Arouesty	
3rd Runner-up	Chiapas – Brian Avelar	
4th Runner-up	Nuevo León – Felipe López Olivares	
Top 10	Durango – Maximiliano Serrato Rivera; Guanajuato – Erick Bolivar; Nayarit – Gerardo González; Sonora – Jorge Alberto Gutiérrez; Tamaulipas – Jorge Hoyos	
Top 15	Ciudad de México – Sergio de Leija; Estado de México – Christian Liévana; Michoacán – Mario Miramontes; Morelos – Alexander Jehiel Flores; San Luis Potosí – Carlos Martinez	

=== Awards ===
Category	Awards	Winner
MAIN AWARDS	Mister Top Model	Coahuila – Jonathan Hurtado Zúñiga
MAIN AWARDS	Sports Challenge	Ciudad de México – Sergio de Leija
MAIN AWARDS	Mister Talent	Morelos – Alexander Jehiel Flores
MAIN AWARDS	English Challenge	Yucatán – Mauricio Cuevas Arouesty
MAIN AWARDS	Multimedia Challenge	Yucatán – Mauricio Cuevas Arouesty
SPECIAL AWARDS	Fitness Body	Coahuila – Jonathan Hurtado Zúñiga
SPECIAL AWARDS	Mister Photogenic	Chihuahua – Juan Manuel Lara
SPECIAL AWARDS	Mister Congeniality	Nayarit – Gerardo González
SPECIAL AWARDS	Historia de México y Cultura General	Nuevo León – Felipe López Olivares

== Official Delegates ==
32 candidates run to win the title.

State	Candidate	Age	Height
Aguascalientes	Alex Alejandro Castán	30	1.84 m (6 ft 1/2 in)
Baja California	Ivan Hernández	27	1.88 m (6 ft 2 in)
Baja California Sur	Leonardo Gutiérrez	22	1.85 m (6 ft 1 in)
Campeche	Óscar Rodríguez	28	1.80 m (5 ft 11 in)
Chiapas	Brian Avelar	24	1.86 m (6 ft 1 in)
Chihuahua	Juan Manuel Lara	33	1.80 m (5 ft 11 in)
Ciudad de México	Sergio de Leija	29	1.80 m (5 ft 11 in)
Coahuila	Jonathan Hurtado Zúñiga	34	1.90 m (6 ft 3 in)
Colima	Arturo Alcalá	24	1.87 m (6 ft 1 1/2 in)
Durango	Maximiliano Serrato Rivera	21	1.83 m (6 ft 0 in)
Estado de México	Christian Liévana	23	1.90 m (6 ft 3 in)
Guanajuato	Erick Bolivar	32	1.94 m (6 ft 4 1/2 in)
Guerrero	José Abraham Velázquez	24	1.80 m (5 ft 11 in)
Hidalgo	Carlos Robles	31	1.78 m (5 ft 10 in)
Jalisco	Luis Cuadra	30	1.83 m (6 ft 0 in)
Michoacán	Mario Miramontes	34	1.88 m (6 ft 2 in)
Morelos	Alexander Jehiel Flores	23	1.80 m (5 ft 11 in)
Nayarit	Gerardo González	21	1.89 m (6 ft 2 1/2 in)
Nuevo León	Felipe López Olivares	33	1.91 m (6 ft 3 in)
Oaxaca	Marco Ortega	21	1.80 m (5 ft 11 in)
Puebla	Jesús Oliva Langurén	20	1.81 m (5 ft 11 1/2 in)
Querétaro	António Tamayo	26	1.91 m (6 ft 3 in)
Quintana Roo	Yair Fong	24	1.78 m (5 ft 10 in)
San Luis Potosí	Carlos Andrés Martinez	24	1.78 m (5 ft 10 in)
Sinaloa	David Mariscal	29	1.83 m (6 ft 0 in)
Sonora	Jorge Alberto Gutiérrez	27	1.80 m (5 ft 11 in)
Tabasco	Francisco Zenteno	25	1.82 m (5 ft 11 1/2 in)
Tamaulipas	Jorge Enrique Hoyos García	30	1.82 m (5 ft 11 1/2 in)
Tlaxcala	Kevin Alejandro Lázaro	28	1.80 m (5 ft 11 in)
Veracruz	Eugenio Salco	28	1.93 m (6 ft 4 in)
Yucatán	Mauricio Cuevas Arouesty	33	1.81 m (5 ft 11 1/2 in)
Zacatecas	Hernán Rico Vázquez	25	1.96 m (6 ft 5 in)
