= Mister México 2017 =

2nd edition of Mister México

- Date: October 14, 2017
- Presenters: Carolina Morán; Karla Vallejo
- Venue: Palacio de la Cultura y la Comunicación, Guadalajara, Jalisco
- Broadcaster: MVS TV • Telemax
- Entrants: 32
- Placements: 15
- Winner: Brian Faugier Nuevo León; Héctor Parga Chihuahua

Mister México 2017 is the 2nd edition of Mister México pageant, held on October 14, 2017 in the Palacio de la Cultura y la Comunicación, Guadalajara, Jalisco. The Mister México 2016 winners subsequently passed on their titles to their respective successors at the end of the event.

The competition is slated to select Mexico's representatives to international male pageants, including Mister World and Mister Supranational.

== Results ==
=== Placements ===
Color keys

- Declared as winner
- Ended as runner-up or top 5/6 qualification
- Ended as one of the finalists or semifinalists
- Ended did not place

=== Mister World Mexico ===
Placement	Contestant	International Placement
Mister World Mexico 2017	Nuevo León – Brian Faugier	2nd Runner-Up – Mister World 2019
1st Runner-up	Veracruz – Rafael Aguilar	
2nd Runner-up	Tamaulipas – Alejandro García	
Top 5	Estado de México – Jacobo Bachrach; Guanajuato – Juan González	
Top 10	Ciudad de México – Eduardo Urquiza; Guerrero – Abdul Zavaleta; Morelos – Bernardo Fabre; Sonora – Juan Mungarro; Yucatán – Javier Hernández	

=== Mister Supranational Mexico ===
Placement	Contestant	International Placement
Mister Supranational Mexico 2017	Chihuahua – Héctor Parga	4th Runner-Up – Mister Supranational 2017
1st Runner-up (Appointed)	Tamaulipas – Alejandro García	Top 20 – Mister Supranational 2018
2nd Runner-up	Ciudad de México – Eduardo Urquiza	
3rd Runner-up	Querétaro – Bruno Almazán	
4th Runner-up	Zacatecas – Jonathan Norman	
Top 10	Chiapas – Rigoberto Chávez; Guerrero – Abdul Zavaleta; Hidalgo – Sebastián Gilardi; Oaxaca – Julio Barrientos; San Luis Potosí – Jaime Márquez	

== Official Contestant ==
32 contestant competed for the title.

State	Contestant	Age	Height
Aguascalientes	Hugo Robledo	21	1.78 m (5 ft 10 in)
Baja California	Angel Barbosa	25	1.85 m (6 ft 1 in)
Baja California Sur	Ernesto Amador	21	1.89 m (6 ft 2 1/2 in)
Campeche	Carlos Eduardo Ocampo	27	1.88 m (6 ft 2 in)
Chiapas	Rigoberto Chávez	28	1.80 m (5 ft 11 in)
Chihuahua	Hector Javier Parga Frías	23	1.86 m (6 ft 1 in)
Ciudad de México	Eduardo Urquiza	27	1.90 m (6 ft 3 in)
Coahuila	Omar Almeida	27	1.85 m (6 ft 1 in)
Colima	Jesus Valle	25	1.82 m (5 ft 11 1/2 in)
Durango	Alan Everest Carrillo	27	1.83 m (6 ft 0 in)
Estado de México	Jacobo Elias Bachrach	24	1.84 m (6 ft 1/2 in)
Guanajuato	Juan Carlos González	25	1.88 m (6 ft 2 in)
Guerrero	Abdul Zavaleta Faddul	23	1.90 m (6 ft 3 in)
Hidalgo	Sebastian Gilardi	21	1.84 m (6 ft 1/2 in)
Jalisco	Kyle Blagg	21	1.85 m (6 ft 1 in)
Michoacán	Alexis Guerrero Lozano	24	1.90 m (6 ft 3 in)
Morelos	Bernardo Fabre	27	1.85 m (6 ft 1 in)
Nayarit	Carlos Abraham Ramos	21	1.80 m (5 ft 11 in)
Nuevo León	Brian Arturo Faugier González	23	1.90 m (6 ft 3 in)
Oaxaca	Julio Barrientos Pailles	23	1.80 m (5 ft 11 in)
Puebla	Marco Antonio Cajica	26	1.82 m (5 ft 11 1/2 in)
Querétaro	Bruno Alamzan	22	1.83 m (6 ft 0 in)
Quintana Roo	Oscar Fernández Mendoza	27	1.87 m (6 ft 1 1/2 in)
San Luis Potosí	Jaime Márquez	24	1.88 m (6 ft 2 in)
Sinaloa	Javier López Hernández	24	1.84 m (6 ft 1/2 in)
Sonora	Juan Carlos Mungarro	24	1.86 m (6 ft 1 in)
Tabasco	José Manuel Enríquez	24	1.83 m (6 ft 0 in)
Tamaulipas	Alejandro García Torres	24	1.90 m (6 ft 3 in)
Tlaxcala	José Armando Esquivel	23	1.78 m (5 ft 10 in)
Veracruz	Rafael Aguilar	25	1.90 m (6 ft 3 in)
Yucatán	Javier Hernández González	22	1.80 m (5 ft 11 in)
Zacatecas	Jonathan Aranda Norman	25	1.91 m (6 ft 3 in)

Notes

- Alejandro García Torres placed as Top 17 in Mister Model International 2016 in Miami, United States.
- Bernardo Fabre unplaced in Mr Universe Model 2015 in Santo Domingo, Dominican Republic.
