= Miss and Mister Cuba 2022 =

Supranational Cuba pageant

- Date: June 19, 2022
- Presenters: Melisa Rauseo; William Valdés
- Venue: Manuel Artime Theater, Miami, United States
- Broadcaster: Mega TV
- Entrants: 12 (Miss & Mister)
- Placements: 3 (Miss & Mister)
- Winner: Liz Rodríguez; Luis Daniel Gálvez

Miss and Mister Cuba 2022 was the first Supranational Cuba pageant. It was held at the Manuel Artime Theater in Miami, United States on June 19, 2022.

At the end of the event, Prince Julio César crowned Liz Rodríguez of Camagüey as Miss Supranational Cuba 2022. She represented Cuba at the Miss Supranational 2022 pageant, where she did not place.

Also, Luis Daniel Gálvez of La Habana was titled as Mister Supranational Cuba 2022. He represented Cuba at the Mister Supranational 2022 pageant, winning the first title for the country.

== Results ==
=== Miss and Mister Cuba ===
Color key

- Declared as winner
- Ended as runner-up
- Ended as one of the finalists or semifinalists

| Placement | Contestant | International Placement |
|---|---|---|
| Miss Supranational Cuba 2022 | Liz Rodríguez | Unplaced – Miss Supranational 2022 |
| Mister Supranational Cuba 2022 | Luis Daniel Gálvez | Winner — Mister Supranational 2022 |
| Miss Grand Cuba 2022 | Daniela Espinoza (resigned) | Did not compete |
| Miss Grand Cuba 2022 | Fabien Laurencio (assumed) | Unplaced – Miss Grand International 2022 |

== Contestants ==
12 contestants competed for the title:

=== Miss Cuba ===
| Contestant | Age | Hometown |
|---|---|---|
| Daniela Espinosa | 26 | La Habana |
| Estephani Borges | 30 | Manzanillo |
| Fabien Laurencio | 28 | La Habana |
| Jennifer Chag | 26 | La Habana |
| Liz Rodríguez | 18 | Camagüey |
| Yamislaidy García | 25 | La Habana |

=== Mister Cuba ===
| Contestant | Age | Hometown |
|---|---|---|
| Favian Calleja | 23 | La Habana |
| Javier Gallestey | 32 | La Habana |
| José Antonio Rizo | 27 | La Habana |
| Luis Daniel Gálvez | 27 | La Habana |
| Osdany García | 23 | Matanzas |
| Roger Molina | 26 | Santiago de Cuba |
