= Mister Jalisco 2023 =

Beauty pageant

- Date: March 17, 2023
- Presenters: Regina Salman; Chema Goncort
- Venue: Main square of Amatitán, Jalisco
- Broadcaster: Facebook
- Entrants: 8
- Placements: 4
- Winner: Luis Cuadra; Zapopan

Mister Jalisco 2023 was a male beauty pageant of the Mister México contest, held at the main square of Amatitán, Jalisco, on March 17, 2023. Nine contestants competed for the title. At the conclusion of the final night of competition Luis Cuadra of Zapopan was crowned the winner. Cuadra was crowned by Miss Mexico Organization national director Adan Sotelo.

== Results ==
=== Placements ===
Final results	Contestant
Mister Jalisco 2023	Zapopan – Luis Cuadra
1st Runner-up	Guadalajara – Jorge Manuel Lamas
2nd Runner-up	Etzatlán – Felipe António Tamayo
3rd Runner-up	Chapala – Jesús Oliva Langurén

=== Special Award ===
Award	Contestant
Top Model	Zapopan – Luis Cuadra
Best Body	Guadalajara – Jorge Manuel Lamas
Social Media	Chapala – Jesús Oliva Langurén

== Contestants ==
Hometown	Candidate	Age	Height
Chapala	Jesús Oliva Langurén	20	1.81 m (5 ft 11 1/2 in)
El Arenal	Oswaldo Cuevas	25	1.84 m (6 ft 1/2 in)
Guadalajara	Jorge Manuel Lamas	34	1.81 m (5 ft 11 1/2 in)
La Huerta	César Díaz	22	1.80 m (5 ft 11 in)
Etzatlán	Felipe António Tamayo	26	1.91 m (6 ft 3 in)
Puerto Vallarta	Javier de la Torre	25	1.87 m (6 ft 1 1/2 in)
Zapopan	Luis Cuadra	30	1.83 m (6 ft 0 in)
Zapotlán el Grande	Héctor Leonardo Barajas	23	1.83 m (6 ft 0 in)
