= Adam Wyszyński =

Polish model, journalist, and activist

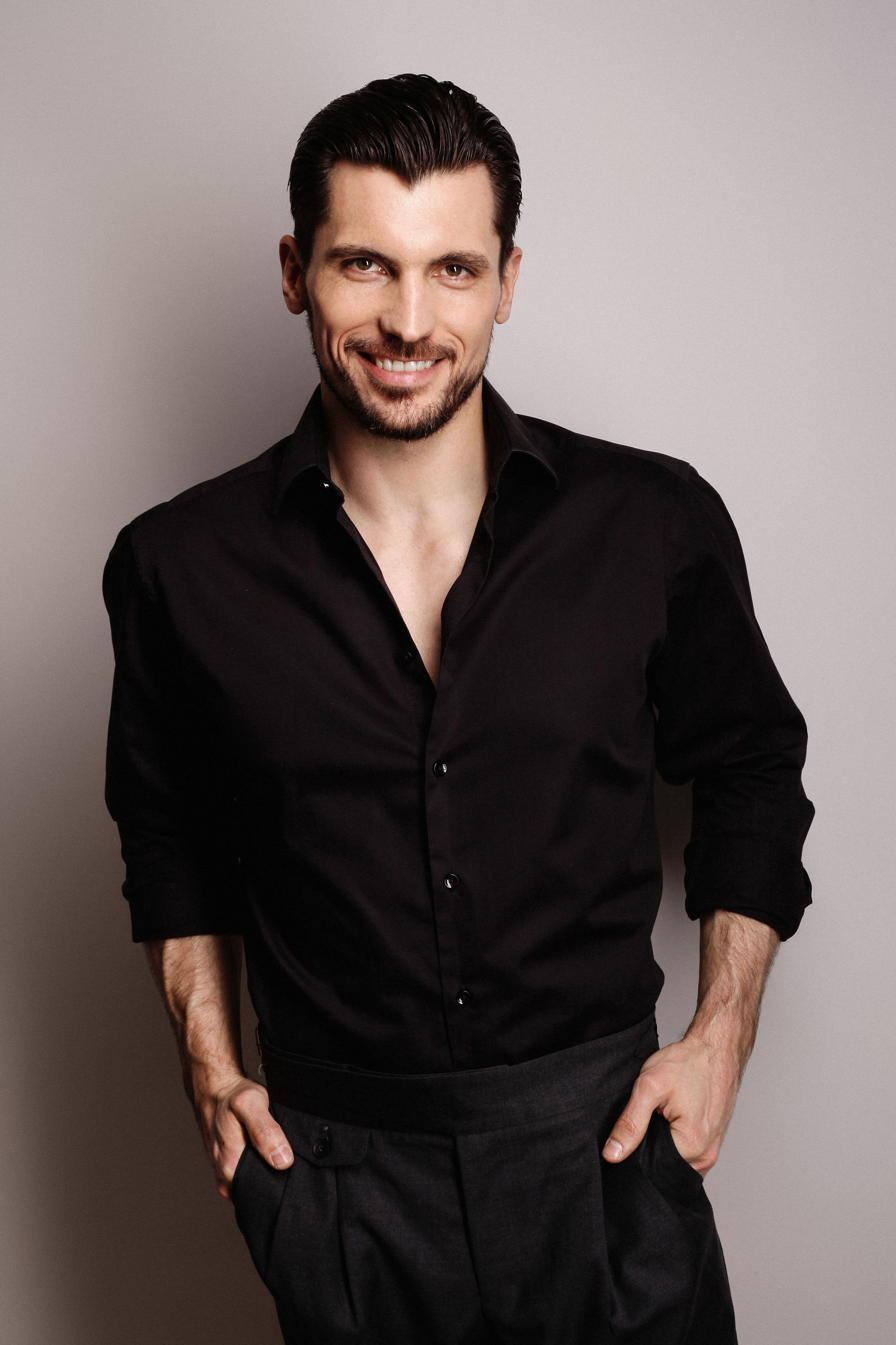
- Born: 1993 (age 32–33); Żagań
- Occupations: Journalist, Lawyer
- Known for: Mister Poland 2025

Adam Bronisław Wyszyński (born 1993 in Żagań) is a Polish male fashion model, journalist, social and political activist, entrepreneur and Mister Poland 2025.

== Life and career ==
He was born in 1993 in Żagań. He graduated in law studies from University of Szczecin. He also completed an postgraduate education of sales management at SGH Warsaw School of Economics.

He was an activist of the All-Polish Youth. In the 2014 European Parliament elections, he was the candidate of the National Movement Voters' Electoral Committee, coming third in constituency no. 13, covering the Lubusz and West Pomeranian Voivodeships, in which he won 466 votes, failing to obtain a seat.

Wyszyński is the owner of the Scrum Media group and the editor-in-chief of the PKB24.pl portal, which deals with economic and social issues. He also runs TimeMachines.pl - a vintage car rental company He was the originator and owner of a start-up Ready-Used that produced recycled leather weekend bags from car upholstery leather. In his business activities, he combines the areas of PR and Public Affairs. As a master of ceremonies, Wyszyński leads business conferences and events.

Adam Wyszyński is also involved in social activities. As a board member of the Institute of Social Entrepreneurship Foundation, he supports initiatives related to social responsibility, education and integration of business and public environments. In the foundation, he is responsible for promoting civic engagement and sustainable development.

In 2025, he won the title of Mister Poland. His victory in the competition allowed him to represent the Poland in international competitions. In June 2025, he will represent Poland at Mister Supranational.
