= List of Miss Supranational titleholders =

List of Miss Supranational titleholders, Miss Supranational winners

The following is a list of women who have won the Miss Supranational title.

== Miss Supranational titleholders ==
Year	Country/Territory	Titleholder	Age	Hometown	National Title	Location	Date	Entrants
2009	Ukraine	Oksana Moria	20	Dnipro	Miss Supranational Ukraine 2009	Płock, Poland	September 5, 2009	36
2010	Panama	Karina Pinilla	25	Chitré	Miss Supranational Panamá 2010	Płock, Poland	August 28, 2010	66
2011	Poland	Monika Lewczuk	23	Łomża	Miss Supranational Polski 2011	Płock, Poland	August 26, 2011	70
2012	Belarus	Katsiaryna Buraya	23	Minsk	Miss Supranational Belarus 2012	Warsaw, Poland	September 14, 2012	53
2013	Philippines	Mutya Datul	21	Santa Maria	Binibining Pilipinas Supranational 2013	Minsk, Belarus	September 6, 2013	83
2014	India	Asha Bhat	22	Bhadravati	Miss Diva Supranational 2014	Krynica-Zdrój, Poland	December 5, 2014	71
2015	Paraguay	Stephania Stegman	23	Asunción	Miss Supranational Paraguay 2015	Krynica-Zdrój, Poland	December 4, 2015	82
2016	India	Srinidhi Shetty	24	Mangaluru	Miss Diva Supranational 2016	Krynica-Zdrój, Poland	December 2, 2016	71
2017	South Korea	Jenny Kim	23	Seoul	Miss Supranational Korea 2017	Krynica-Zdrój, Poland	December 1, 2017	65
2018	Puerto Rico	Valeria Vázquez	24	San Juan	Miss Supranational Puerto Rico 2018	Krynica-Zdrój, Poland	December 7, 2018	72
2019	Thailand	Anntonia Porsild	23	Nakhon Ratchasima	Miss Supranational Thailand 2019	Katowice, Poland	December 6, 2019	77
~~2020~~	No competition held due to the COVID-19 pandemic (Note: The 2019 titleholder Anntonia Porsild reigned Miss Supranational until 2021 due to the cancellation of the 2020 pageant because of the worldwide COVID-19 pandemic)							
2021	Namibia	Chanique Rabe	24	Windhoek	Miss Supranational Namibia 2020	Nowy Sącz, Poland	August 21, 2021	58
2022	South Africa	Lalela Mswane	25	Richards Bay	Miss South Africa 2021	Nowy Sącz, Poland	July 15, 2022	69
2023	Ecuador	Andrea Aguilera	22	Ventanas	CNB Ecuador Supranational 2023	Nowy Sącz, Poland	July 14, 2023	65
2024	Indonesia	Harashta Haifa Zahra	20	Bandung	Puteri Indonesia 2024	Nowy Sącz, Poland	July 6, 2024	68
2025	Brazil	Eduarda Braum	24	Afonso Cláudio	Miss Supranational Brazil 2025	Nowy Sącz, Poland	June 27, 2025	66
2026	Philippines	Katrina Llegado	28	Taguig	The Miss Philippines Supranational 2025	Nowy Sącz, Poland	July 31, 2026	67

=== League tables ===
==== Countries by number of wins ====
Country or territory	Titles	Years
Philippines	2	2013, 2026
India	2	2014, 2016
Brazil	1	2025
Indonesia	1	2024
Ecuador	1	2023
South Africa	1	2022
Namibia	1	2021
Thailand	1	2019
Puerto Rico	1	2018
South Korea	1	2017
Paraguay	1	2015
Belarus	1	2012
Poland	1	2011
Panama	1	2010
Ukraine	1	2009

==== Continents by number of wins ====
Continent or region	Titles	Years
Asia	7	2013, 2014, 2016, 2017, 2019, 2024, 2026
Americas	5	2010, 2015, 2018, 2023, 2025
Europe	3	2009, 2011, 2012
Africa	2	2021, 2022
Oceania	0	

Debut wins

Debut wins timeline
Decade	Countries/Territories/States
2000s	List: 2009: Ukraine
2010s	List: 2010: Panama; 2011: Poland; 2012: Belarus; 2013: Philippines; 2014: India; 2015: Paraguay; 2017: South Korea; 2018: Puerto Rico; 2019: Thailand
2020s	List: 2021: Namibia; 2022: South Africa; 2023: Ecuador; 2024: Indonesia; 2025: Brazil

== Gallery of winners ==
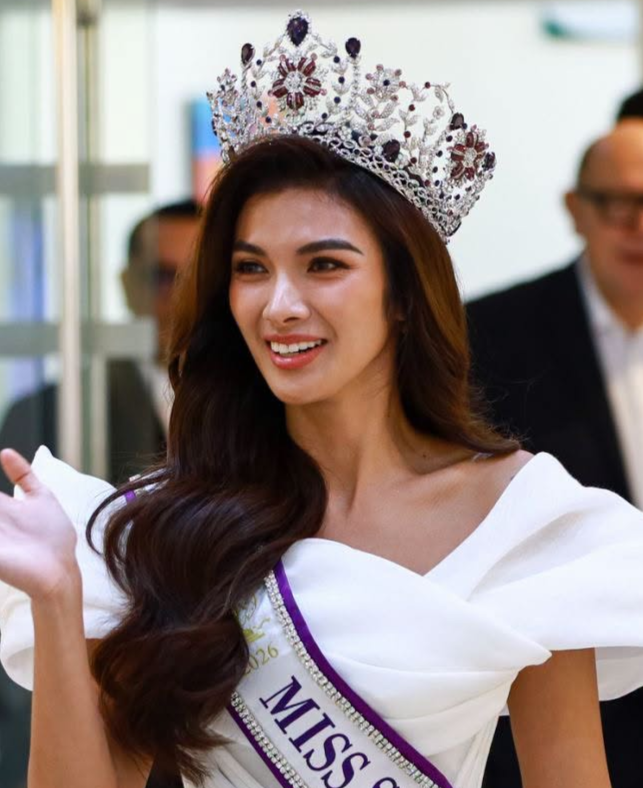
Miss Supranational 2026
Katrina Llegado,
Philippines

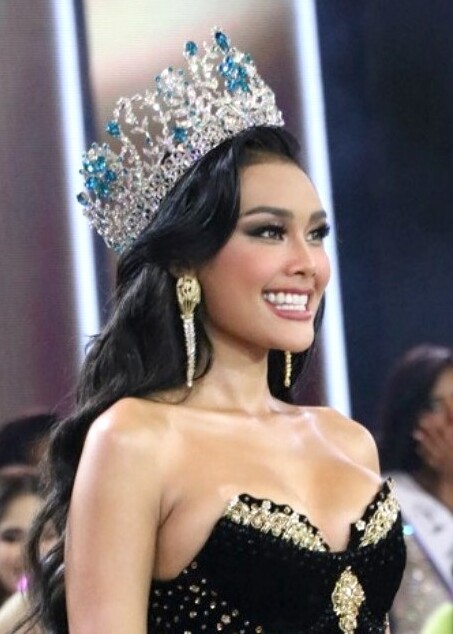
Miss Supranational 2024
Harashta Haifa Zahra,
Indonesia

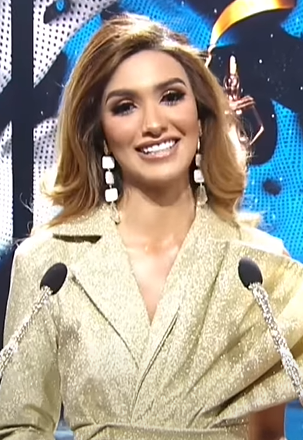
Miss Supranational 2023
Andrea Aguilera,
Ecuador

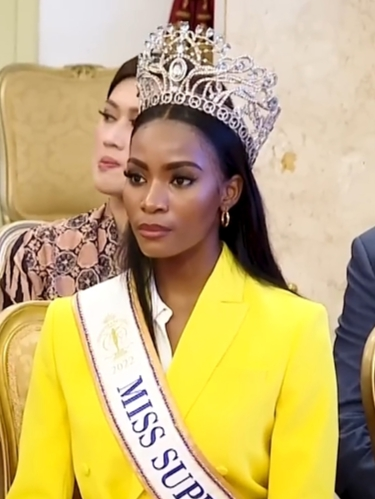
Miss Supranational 2022
Lalela Mswane,
South Africa

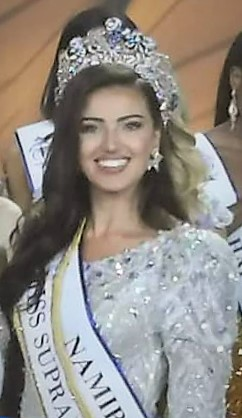
Miss Supranational 2021
Chanique Rabe,
Namibia

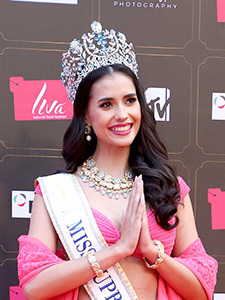
Miss Supranational 2019
Anntonia Porsild,
Thailand

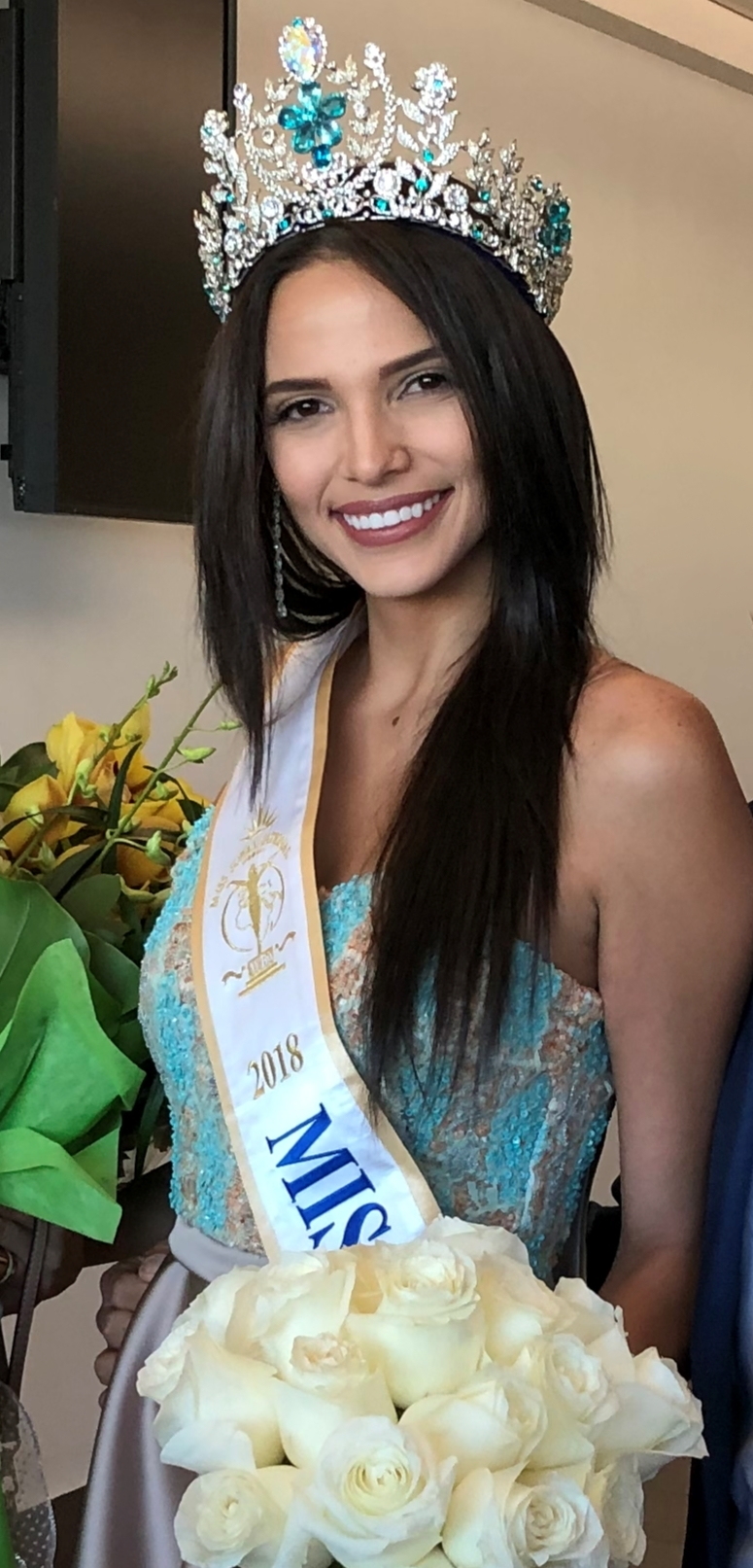
Miss Supranational 2018
Valeria Vázquez,
Puerto Rico

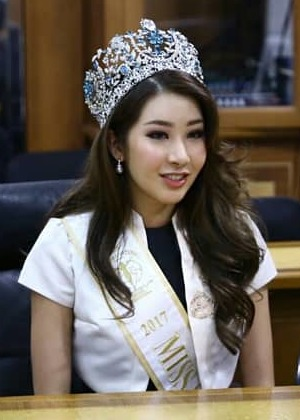
Miss Supranational 2017
Jenny Kim,
South Korea

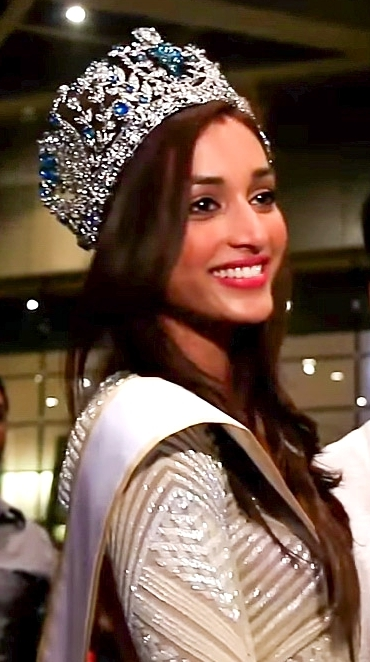
Miss Supranational 2016
Srinidhi Shetty,
India

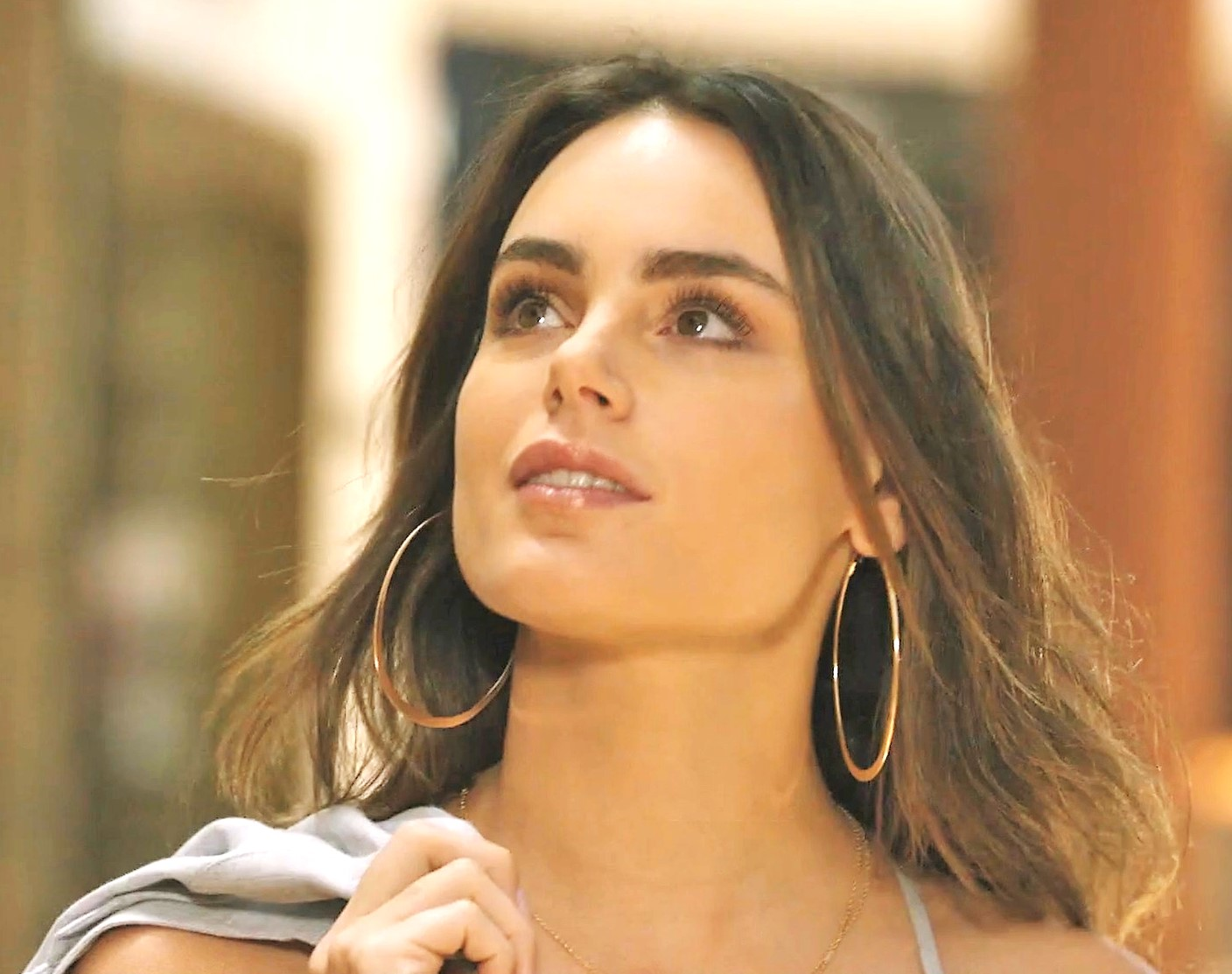
Miss Supranational 2015
Stephania Stegman,
Paraguay

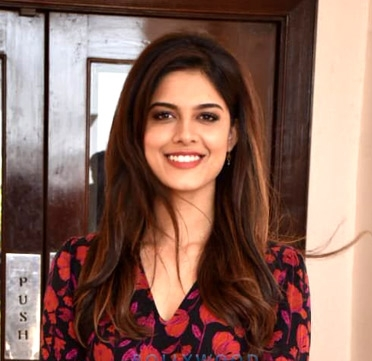
Miss Supranational 2014
Asha Bhat,
India

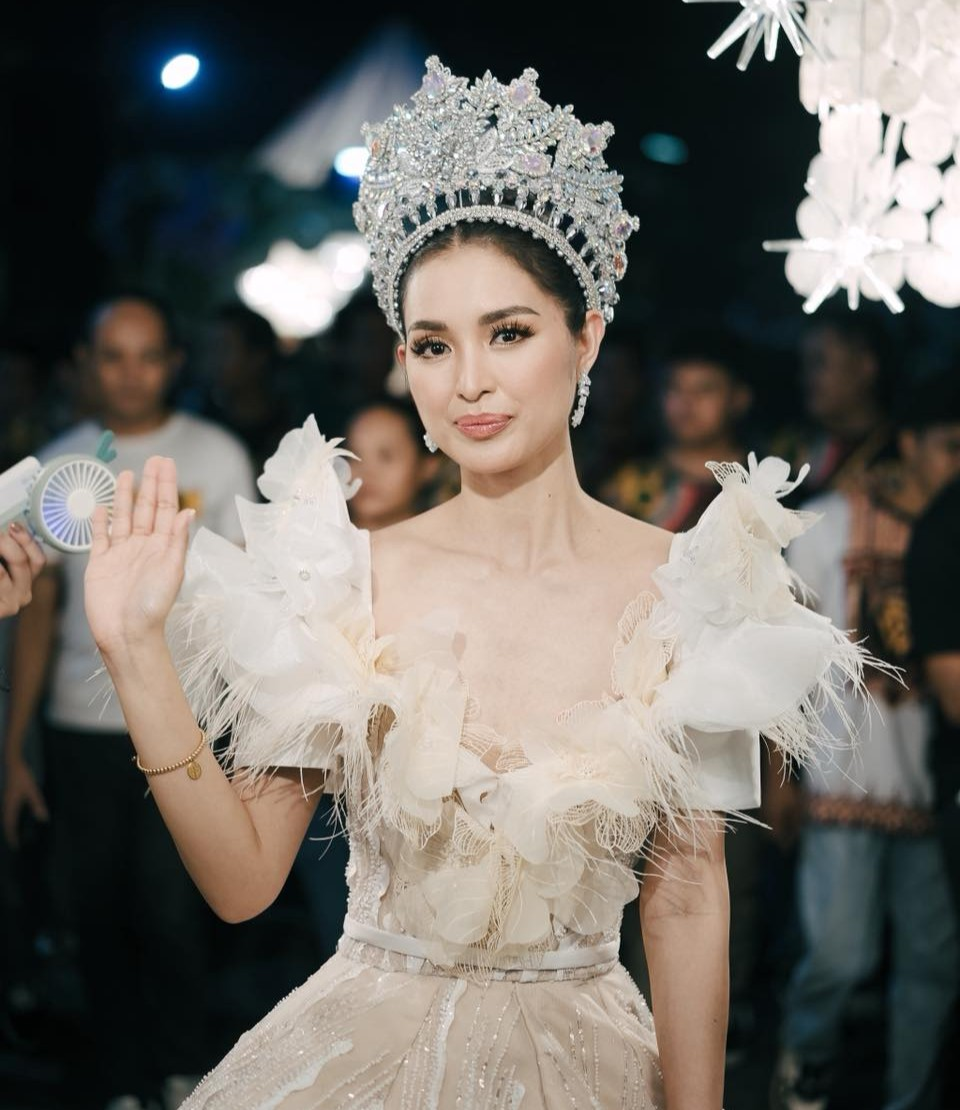
Miss Supranational 2013
Mutya Datul,
Philippines

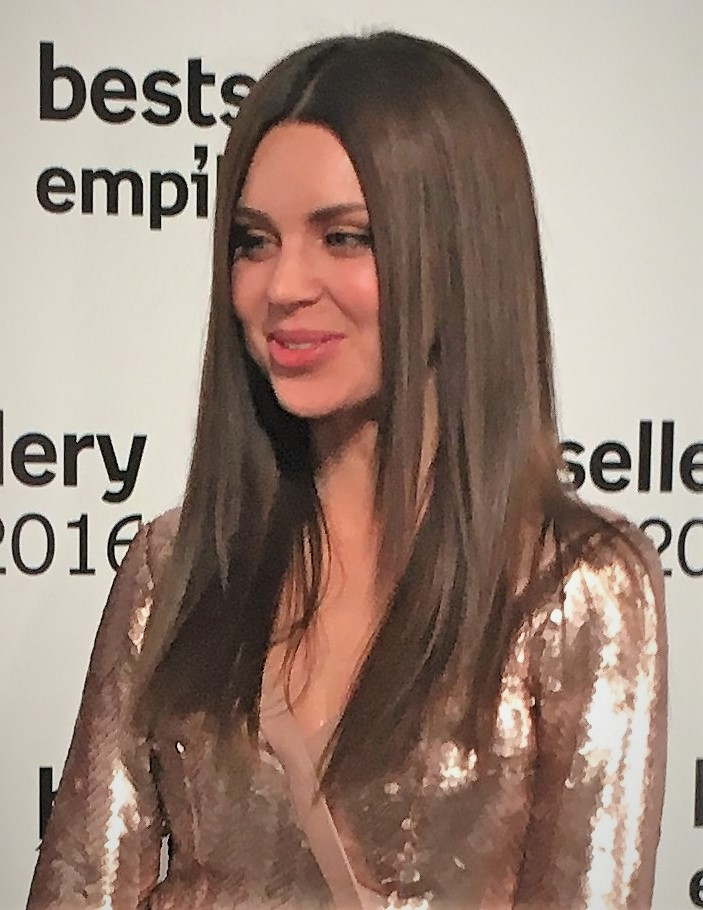
Miss Supranational 2011
Monika Lewczuk,
Poland

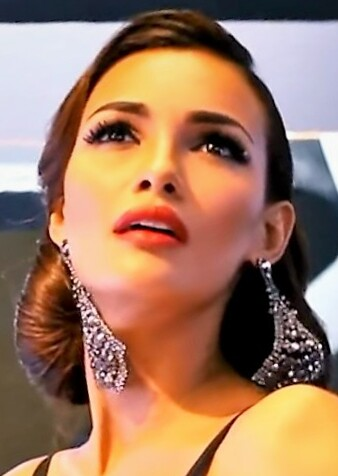
Miss Supranational 2010
Karina Pinilla,
Panama

== Table of Miss Supranational runners-up and finalists ==
Year	1st Runner-Up (2nd Place)	2nd Runner-Up (3rd Place)	3rd Runner-Up (4th Place)	4th Runner-Up (5th Place)
2009	Belarus; Marina Lepesha	Poland; Klaudia Ungerman	Honduras; Ruth Alvarado	England; Amanda Ball
2010	Czech Republic; Hana Věrná	Slovenia; Sandra Marinović	Peru; Claudia Villafuerte	Thailand; Maythavee Burapasing
2011	Belarus; Liudmila Yakimovich	Puerto Rico; Valery Velez	Vietnam; Daniela Nguyễn Thu Mây	United States; Krystelle Khoury
2012	Thailand; Nanthawan Wannachutha	Czech Republic; Michaela Dihlová	Philippines; Elaine Moll	Ecuador; Sulay Castillo
2013	Mexico; Jacqueline Morales	Turkey; Leyla Kose	Indonesia; Cokorda Widani	US Virgin Islands; Esonica Veira
2014	Thailand; Parapadsorn Vorrasirinda	Gabon; Maggaly Nguema	United States; Allyn Rose	Poland; Katarzyna Krzeszowska
2015	Canada; Siera Bearchell	Colombia; Mónica Castaño	Iceland; Tanja Ýr Ástþórsdóttir	Mexico; Karina Martin
2016	Venezuela; Valeria Vespoli	Suriname; Jaleesa Pigot	Sri Lanka; Ornella Gunesekere	Hungary; Korinna Kocsis
2017	Colombia; Tica Martinez	Romania; Bianca Tirsin	Ethiopia; Bitaniya Yosef	Puerto Rico; Larissa Santiago
2018	United States; Katrina Dimaranan	Poland; Magdalena Bieńkowska	Indonesia; Wilda Situngkir	Mexico; Diana Romero Ortega
2019	Namibia; Yana Haenisch	Indonesia; Jesica Fitriana	Peru; Janick Maceta	Venezuela; Gabriela de la Cruz
2021	Puerto Rico; Karla Guilfú	South Africa; Thato Mosehle	Venezuela; Valentina Sánchez	Dominican Republic; Eoanna Constanza
2022	Thailand; Praewwanich Ruangthong	Vietnam; Nguyễn Huỳnh Kim Duyên	Indonesia; Adinda Cresheilla	Venezuela; Ismelys Velásquez
2023	Philippines; Pauline Amelinckx	Brazil; Sancler Frantz	United Kingdom; Emma Collingridge	Vietnam; Đặng Thanh Ngân
2024	United States; Jenna Dykstra	Czech Republic; Justýna Zedníková	Brazil; Isadora Murta	Curacao; Chanelle de Lau
2025	Germany; Anna Lakrini	Curacao; Quishantely Leito	Philippines; Tarah Valencia	Puerto Rico; Valerie Klepadlo
2026	France; Eve Gilles	Brazil; Lara Marina	Nigeria; Ndah Eno	Czech Republic; Karolína Gorylová

=== First Runner-Up ===
If the winner cannot fulfill her duties as Miss Supranational for whatever reasons, the first runner-up will take over.

The following are the Miss Supranational first runners-up since the pageant's inception in 2009:

Country or territory	Titles	Years
Thailand	3	2012, 2014, 2022
Belarus	2	2009, 2011
United States	2	2018, 2024
France	1	2026
Germany	1	2025
Philippines	1	2023
Puerto Rico	1	2021
Namibia	1	2019
Colombia	1	2017
Venezuela	1	2016
Canada	1	2015
Mexico	1	2013
Czech Republic	1	2010

=== 2nd Runner Up ===
Here are the Second-Runner Ups since its inception in 2009.

Country or territory	Titles	Years
Poland	2	2009, 2018
Czech Republic	2	2012, 2024
Brazil	2	2023, 2026
Curaçao	1	2025
Vietnam	1	2022
South Africa	1	2021
Indonesia	1	2019
Romania	1	2017
Suriname	1	2016
Colombia	1	2015
Gabon	1	2014
Turkey	1	2013
Puerto Rico	1	2011
Slovenia	1	2010

=== 3rd Runner Up ===
Here are the Third-Runner Ups since its inception in 2009.

Country or territory	Titles	Years
Indonesia	3	2013, 2018, 2022
Philippines	2	2012, 2025
Peru	2	2010, 2019
Nigeria	1	2026
Brazil	1	2024
United Kingdom	1	2023
Venezuela	1	2021
Ethiopia	1	2017
Sri Lanka	1	2016
Iceland	1	2015
United States	1	2014
Vietnam	1	2011
Honduras	1	2009

=== 4th Runner Up ===
Here are the Fourth-Runner Ups since its inception in 2009.

Country or territory	Titles	Years
Puerto Rico	2	2017, 2025
Venezuela	2	2019, 2022
Mexico	2	2015, 2018
Czech Republic	1	2026
Curacao	1	2024
Vietnam	1	2023
Dominican Republic	1	2021
Hungary	1	2016
Poland	1	2014
US Virgin Islands	1	2013
Ecuador	1	2012
United States	1	2011
Thailand	1	2010
England	1	2009

== Miss Supranational runners-up and finalists table position ==
Country/territory	Total	Miss Supranational (1st Place)	1st Runner-Up (2nd Place)	2nd Runner-Up (3rd Place)	3rd Runner-Up (4th Place)	4th Runner-Up (5th Place)
Philippines	5	2 (2013, 2026)	1 (2023)	×	2 (2012, 2025)	×
India	2	2 (2014, 2016)	×	×	×	×
Thailand	5	1 (2019)	3 (2012, 2014, 2022)	×	×	1 (2010)
Belarus	3	1 (2012)	2 (2009, 2011)	×	×	×
Puerto Rico	5	1 (2018)	1 (2021)	1 (2011)	×	2 (2017, 2025)
Namibia	2	1 (2021)	1 (2019)	×	×	×
Poland	4	1 (2011)	×	2 (2009, 2018)	×	1 (2014)
Indonesia	5	1 (2024)	×	1 (2019)	3 (2013, 2018, 2022)	×
Brazil	4	1 (2025)	×	1 (2023, 2026)	1 (2024)	×
South Africa	2	1 (2022)	×	1 (2021)	×	×
Ecuador	2	1 (2023)	×	×	×	1 (2012)
South Korea	1	1 (2017)	×	×	×	×
Paraguay	1	1 (2015)	×	×	×	×
Panama	1	1 (2010)	×	×	×	×
Ukraine	1	1 (2009)	×	×	×	×
United States	4	×	2 (2018, 2024)	×	1 (2014)	1 (2011)
Czech Republic	4	×	1 (2010)	2 (2012, 2024)	×	1 (2026)
Colombia	2	×	1 (2017)	1 (2015)	×	×
Venezuela	4	×	1 (2016)	×	1 (2021)	2 (2019, 2022)
Mexico	3	×	1 (2013)	×	×	2 (2015, 2018)
France	1	×	1 (2026)	×	×	×
Germany	1	×	1 (2025)	×	×	×
Canada	1	×	1 (2015)	×	×	×
Vietnam	3	×	×	1 (2022)	1 (2011)	1 (2023)
Curacao	2	×	×	1 (2025)	×	1 (2024)
Romania	1	×	×	1 (2017)	×	×
Suriname	1	×	×	1 (2016)	×	×
Gabon	1	×	×	1 (2014)	×	×
Turkey	1	×	×	1 (2013)	×	×
Slovenia	1	×	×	1 (2010)	×	×
Peru	2	×	×	×	2 (2010, 2019)	×
Nigeria	1	×	×	×	1 (2026)	×
United Kingdom	1	×	×	×	1 (2023)	
Ethiopia	1	×	×	×	1 (2017)	×
Sri Lanka	1	×	×	×	1 (2016)	×
Iceland	1	×	×	×	1 (2015)	×
Honduras	1	×	×	×	1 (2009)	×
Dominican Republic	1	×	×	×	×	1 (2021)
Hungary	1	×	×	×	×	1 (2016)
US Virgin Islands	1	×	×	×	×	1 (2013)
England	1	×	×	×	×	1 (2009)
Total	**85**	**17**	**17**	**17**	**17**	**17**

The country/territory who assumed a position is indicated in bold
The country/territory who was dethroned, resigned or originally held the position is indicated in striketrough
The country/territory who was dethroned, resigned or originally held the position but was not replaced is indicated underlined

== Continental Queens ==
Year	Miss Supranational America	Miss Supranational Caribbean	Miss Supranational Asia	Miss Supranational Oceania	Miss Supranational Europe	Miss Supranational Africa
2009	Karine Osorio; Brazil	Not awarded	Xiaoou Liu; Taiwan	Not awarded	Linda Mosatova; Slovenia	Not awarded
2010	Laksmi Rodríguez; Venezuela	Not awarded	Yu Soo-jung; South Korea	Not awarded	Anna Jamroz; Poland	Fatou Khan; Gambia
2011	Sofinel Baez Santos; Dominican Republic		Michelle Almeida; India	Not awarded	Analisa Kebaili; France	Dhesha Jeram; South Africa
2012	Elissa Estrada Cortez; Panama	Not awarded	Lại Hương Thảo; Vietnam	Not awarded	Julia Prokopenko; Denmark	Michelle Ann Gildenhuys; South Africa
2013	Raquel Benetti; Brazil	Not awarded	Esma Voloder; Australia	Not awarded	Veronika Chachina; Belarus	Hillary Ondo; Gabon
2014	Bárbara Marrero; Puerto Rico		Han Thi; Myanmar	Not awarded	Jana Zapletalová; Czech Republic	Maria Andeme Obama; Guinea-Bissau
2015	Angie Keith; Panama	Not awarded	Aafreen Rachael Vaz; India	Not awarded	Petra Denkova; Slovenia	Sonia Gisa; Rwanda
2016	Valeria Vespoli; Venezuela	Not awarded	Srinidhi Shetty; India	Not awarded	Korinna Kocsis; Hungary	Ambika Geetanjalee; Mauritius
2017	Nicole Menayo; Costa Rica	Not awarded	Jiraprapa Boonnuang; Thailand	Not awarded	Paulina Maziarz; Poland	Anyier Deng Yuol; South Sudan
2018	Bárbara Reis; Brazil	Shamira Nadine Jap; Suriname	Nguyễn Minh Tú; Vietnam	Maddison-Clare Sloane; Australia	Andreea Coman; Romania	Anoushka Ah keng Mauritius
2019	Regina Grey; United States	Yaliza Burgos; Dominican Republic	Nguyễn Thị Ngọc Châu; Vietnam	Eva Louise Wilson; New Zealand	Hana Vagnerova; Czech Republic	Angele Kossinda; Cameroon
2021	Deise Benício; Brazil	Pascale Bélony; Haiti	Jihane Almira Chedid; Indonesia	Not awarded	Natalia Balicka; Poland	Phidelia Mutunga; Kenya
2022	Valentina Espinosa; Colombia	Carisa Peart; Jamaica	Ritika Khatnani; India	Not awarded	Agata Wdowiak; Poland	Alexandrine Belle-Étoile; Mauritius
2023	Valeria Flórez; Peru	Andreina Pereira; Curaçao	Pragnya Ayyagari; India	Not awarded	Michelle Lopez Desoisa; Gibraltar	Sakhile Dube; Zimbabwe
2024	Andrea Sáenz; Mexico	Fiorella Medina; Puerto Rico	Alethea Ambrosio; Philippines		Victoria Larsen; Denmark	Bryoni Govender; South Africa
2025	Marvelous Sanyaolu; United States	Karibel Perez; Dominican Republic	Firsta Yufi Amarta Putri; Indonesia		Lilja Sif Pétursdóttir; Iceland	NaMakau Nawa; Zambia
2026	Silvia Maestre; Venezuela	Rasheda Green; Jamaica	Agnes Rahajeng; Indonesia		Oliwia Mikulska; Poland	Tracy Nabukeera; Tanzania

== See also ==
- List of Mister Supranational titleholders
- List of Miss Supranational countries
- List of beauty pageants
