= Mister Tourism International =

International male beauty pageant competition

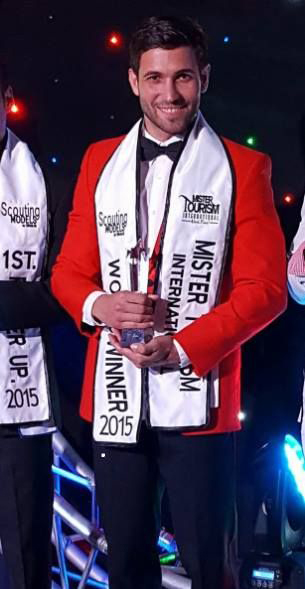
- Formation: 2001
- Dissolved: 2016
- Type: Beauty pageant
- Headquarters: Panama
- Official language: Spanish
- Budget: $1M
- Website: Official site

Mister Tourism International is a male beauty pageant realized annual in Panama. The competition gathers more than fifteen contestants around the world searching for one reason: the title of Mister Tourism International. The contest started in 2001 but failed between 2002 until 2010, backing with a new franchise. The current titleholder is José Alfredo Galarza from Puerto Rico.

== Winners ==
Year	Titleholder	Country	Venue	Nº
2001	Aitor Trigos Núñez	Spain	Riande Continental Hotel, Panama City, Panama	15
2002	Dean Kelly	Panama	Teatro Nacional, Panama City, Panama	18
2010	Jorge Alberto Rojas	Bolivia	Atlapa Convention Centre, Panama City, Panama	18
2012	Samuel Cassar	Malta	The Beach House, Panama City, Panama	17
2013	José Daniel Ramírez	Costa Rica	Sands Pure Lounge, Panama City, Panama	14
2014	Andrio Frazon	Brazil	Veneto Wyndham Grand Hotel, Panama City, Panama	19
2015	José Alfredo Galarza	Puerto Rico	BlueBay City Hotel, Panama City, Panama	17

== Winners by country ==
Titles	Country	Victories
1	Puerto Rico	2015
1	Brazil	2014
1	Costa Rica	2013
1	Malta	2012
1	Bolivia	2010
1	Panama	2002
1	Spain	2001

== Winners by Continent ==
Titles	Continent	Victories
5	Americas	Panama, Bolivia, Costa Rica, Brazil and Puerto Rico (1)
2	Europe	Spain and Malta (1)

== Ranking ==
Rank	Country	1st	2nd	3rd	4th	5th	Sem	Total
1º	Puerto Rico	1	1	1	1		1	5
2º	Spain	1	1			1		3
3º	Panama	1	1				3	5
4º	Bolivia	1						1
5º	Brazil	1						1
6º	Costa Rica	1						1
7º	Malta	1						1
8º	Latvia		1	1				2
9º	Mexico		1			1		2
10º	Ecuador		1				1	2
11º	Singapore		1					1
12º	Venezuela			2	1		4	7
13º	Colombia			1			2	3
14º	Nicaragua			1				1
15º	Denmark			1				1
16º	Dominican Republic				1		1	2
17º	Philippines				1			1
18º	United States						3	3
19º	Belgium						2	2
20º	Chile						1	1

== See also ==
- Manhunt International
- Mister World
- Mister International
