= Matthew Gilbert Wibowo =

Indonesian Ambassador, model and Mister Supranational Indonesia 2022

- Born: 13 March 2000 (age 26); Purwokerto, Banyumas Regency, Central Java, Indonesia
- Education: Universitas Prasetiya Mulya
- Height: 1.85 m (6 ft 1 in)
- Beauty pageant titleholder
- Title: Mister Supranational Indonesia 2022
- Hair color: Black
- Eye color: Brown
- Major competitions: L-Men of The Year 2021; (1st Runner-up); Mister Supranational 2022; (1st Runner-up)

Matthew Gilbert Wibowo (March 13, 2000) is an Indonesian model and entrepreneur who was named the first runner-up L-Men of The Year 2021. He represented Indonesia at Mister Supranational 2022 in Poland, where he managed to make history by reaching the first runner-up position.

== Early life and education ==
Matthew was born on March 13, 2000 in Purwokerto, Banyumas Regency, Central Java. He developed a fruit drink business with a zero-waste concept. In 2022, Matthew graduated with a business degree at the Universitas Prasetiya Mulya. With all the businesses that he has been involved in, he has received the Best of Beverage award for the Business Creation course at his campus.

== Pageantry ==
=== L-Men of The Year 2021 ===
In 2021, Matthew competed in the 15th edition of the L-Men of The Year contest, held in Jakarta, Indonesia. The event was attended by Puteri Indonesia 2016, Kezia Warouw, and L-Men of The Year 2019, Radityo Wahyu Senoputro as the jury. Matthew managed to get out and was announced as the 1st Runner-up.

=== Mister Supranational 2022 ===
The organizers of the L-Men of The Year officially appointed Matthew to compete at the Mister Supranational held on July 16, 2022, at the Strzelecki Park Amphitheater in Nowy Sącz, Małopolska, Poland. At the end of the event, he managed to come out as one of the top 5 finalists and was finally announced as the 1st Runner-up.

Awards and achievements
Preceded by (Togo) Abdel Kacem Tefridj	Mister Supranational 1st Runner-up; 2022	Succeeded by (Brazil) Henrique Martins
Preceded by Okky Alparessi	Mister Supranational Indonesia; 2022	Succeeded by Adib Dwitamma
