= Gabriel Castañeda =

Mexican model and male pageant titleholder

- Born: March 4, 1991 (age 35); Guadalajara, Jalisco, Mexico
- Occupation: Model
- Height: 1.86 m (6 ft 1 in)
- Beauty pageant titleholder
- Hair color: Black
- Eye color: Brown
- Major competitions: Mister Jalisco 2026; (Winner); Mister México 2026; (Winner – Mister Supranational Mexico); Mister Supranational 2026; (4th Runner-up)

Gabriel Castañeda (born March 4, 1991) is a Mexican model who won Mister Supranational Mexico and represented his country at the Mister Supranational pageant, where he finished as fourth runner-up.

== Pageantry ==
Castañeda received the title of Mister Jalisco 2026, thus gaining the responsibility of representing her state in the Mister México pageant. He competed in Mister México 2026, held at the Dion live Center, Monterrey, Nuevo León on April 18, 2026. At the end of the night, he was titled Mister Supranational Mexico 2026 by the outgoing titleholder, Mauricio Calvo of Tabasco.

Castañeda represented Mexico and competed against 41 candidates from their respective countries in the Mister Supranational pageant, held at Strzelecki Park Amphitheater, Nowy Sącz, Małopolska, Poland on August 1, 2026. At the end of the event, he finished as fourth runner-up.

== Personal life ==
He has a connection to the entertainment industry as the father of Irka Castillo, the eldest daughter of well-known Mexican actress and singer Irán Castillo.

Awards and achievements
Preceded by (Philippines) Kenneth Cabungcal	Mister Supranational 4th Runner-up; 2026	Succeeded by Incumbent
Preceded by (Tabasco) Mauricio Calvo	Mister Supranational Mexico; 2026	Succeeded by Incumbent
