= Mister México =

Male beauty pageant organization

- Formation: 2016; 10 years ago
- Type: Male pageant
- Headquarters: Mexico City
- Location: Mexico
- Members: Mister Supranational; Mister Cosmo; Mister World
- Official language: Spanish
- President: Hugo Castellanos

Mister México is a national male beauty contest in Mexico. The contest is responsible for selecting Mexico’s representatives at two international contests: Mister Supranational, Mister Cosmo and Mister World.

== History ==
Hugo Castellanos, franchise owner of Miss Mexico Organization, launched Mister Mexico, holding its inaugural edition on June 11, 2016. In association with Telemax and Televisa, the national pageant is one of biggest pageants in Mexico; 32 men from 31 states and Mexico City compete for the titles of Mister Supranational México, Mister Cosmo Mexico, or Mister World Mexico.

Diego Garcy secured Mexico's first and to date, only Mister Supranational title. This historic victory also marked the first ever win of the Mister Supranational competition. That same year, Aldo Esparza represented Mexico at the Mister World pageant, earning the position of second runner-up

In 2023, Mister Supranational Rising Star Award was awarded to the Mister México Organization for the dedication and work in building and platform for men in Mexico to have a have their voices heard.

== Titleholders ==
Below are the names of the annual titleholders of Mister México, the states they represented and the venue which played host to their victory, in ascending order.

Edition	Date	Mister Supranational Mexico	Mister World Mexico	Mister Cosmo Mexico	Venue	Entrants	Ref.
1st	June 11, 2016	Diego Armando García Merino	Aldo Esparza Ramírez	No Elected	DoubleTree by Hilton, Santa Fe, Mexico City.	15	
2nd	October 14, 2017	Héctor Javier Parga Frías	Brian Arturo Faugier González	No Elected	Palacio de la Cultura y la Comunicación, Jalisco.	32	
——	July 16, 2021	Gustavo Adolfo Rosas González	No Awarded	No Elected	A virtual competition was held solely to select the representative for Mister Supranational 2021.		
3rd	June 12, 2022	Jonathan Moisés Sierra Peñaloza	No Awarded	No Elected	Teatro Galerías, Guadalajara, Jalisco.	31	
4th	May 27, 2023	Luis Carlos García Cuadra	No Awarded	No Elected	Teatro Francisco Javier Clavijero, Puerto de Veracruz, Veracruz.	32	
5th	March 16, 2024	Jairo Zait Villa Reza	Alan Salazar Casillas	No Elected	Teatro Francisco Javier Clavijero, Puerto de Veracruz, Veracruz.	32	
6th	February 8, 2025	César Mauricio Calvo Barrera	No Awarded	No Elected	Teatro Francisco Javier Clavijero, Puerto de Veracruz, Veracruz.	32	
7th	April 18, 2026	Gabriel Castañeda	Sergio Ángel Castro Grijalva	Josué Tovar Torres	Dion live Center, Monterrey, Nuevo León.	31	

== Representatives at international pageants ==
Color key

- : Declared as Winner
- : Ended as Runner-up
- : Ended as one of the Finalist/Semi-finalists

=== Mister Supranational ===
Host/Year	Mister Supranational Mexico	State	Competition performance		Ref.
Host/Year	Mister Supranational Mexico	State	Placements	Title/Award	Ref.
(Poland) 2026	Gabriel Castañeda	Jalisco	4th Runner-up	2 Special Awards: Top 10 – Supra Chat; Top 10 – Mister Top Model	
(Poland) 2025	César Mauricio Calvo Barrera	Tabasco	2nd Runner-up	2 Special Awards: Top 3 – Mister Top Model; Top 6 – Supra Chat	
(Poland) 2024	Jairo Zait Villa Reza	Coahuila	Top 10	3 Special Awards: Top 4 – Talent Round; Top 7 – Supra Chat; Top 10 – Supra Fan-Vote	
(Poland) 2023	Luis Carlos García Cuadra	Jalisco	Top 10	3 Special Awards: Winner – Mister Supranational America; Top 3 – Mister Supra Influencer; Top 10 – Mister Top Model	
(Poland) 2022	Jonathan Moisés Sierra Peñaloza	Tamaulipas	3rd Runner-up	2 Special Awards: Winner – Mister Top Model; Winner – Mister Personality	
(Poland) 2021	Gustavo Adolfo Rosas González	Sinaloa	Top 10	2 Special Awards: Winner – Mister Supranational America; Top 10 – Mister Top Model	
Due to the impact of COVID-19 pandemic, no pageant in 2020
(Poland) 2019	Gustavo Dousset Ayala	Sonora	Unplaced	1 Special Awards: Winner – Mister Friendship	
(Poland) 2018	Alejandro García Torres	Tamaulipas	Top 20	1 Special Awards: Top 5 – Talent Round	
(Poland) 2017	Héctor Javier Parga Frías	Chihuahua	4th Runner-up	1 Special Awards: 4th Runner-up – Extreme Running	
(Poland) 2016	Diego Armando García Merino	Jalisco	Mister Supranational 2016	2 Special Awards: Winner – Mister Supranational America; Winner – Mister Elegance	

=== Mister Cosmo ===
Host/Year	Mister Cosmo Mexico	State	Competition performance		Ref.
Host/Year	Mister Cosmo Mexico	State	Placements	Title/Award	Ref.
(Vietnam) 2026	Josué Tovar Torres	Querétaro			

=== Mister World ===
Host/Year	Mister World Mexico	State	Competition performance	
Host/Year	Mister World Mexico	State	Placements	Title/Award
2026	Sergio Ángel Castro Grijalva	Morelos	TBD	
(Vietnam) 2024	Alan Salazar Casillas	Ciudad de México	Top 20	
(Philippines) 2019	Brian Arturo Faugier González	Nuevo León	2nd Runner-up	
(England) 2016	Aldo Esparza Ramírez	Jalisco	2nd Runner-up	

== See also ==
- Mr World Mexico
- Mr Model México
- Miss Mexico Organization
- Mexicana Universal
- Miss Earth Mexico
- Miss Grand Mexico
- Señorita México
