= Mister México 2016 =

1st edition of Mister México

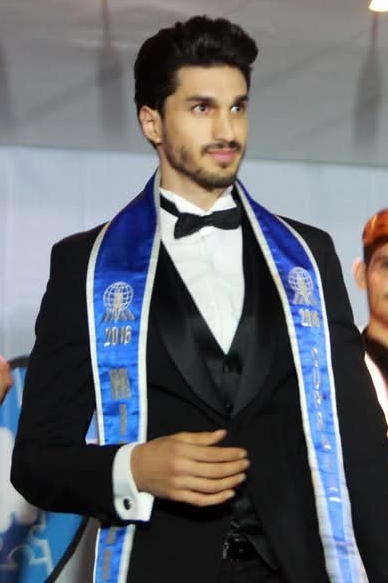
- Diego Garcy – Mister Supranational 2016
- Date: June 11, 2016
- Presenters: Miguel Fritz; Hugo Castellanos
- Venue: DoubleTree by Hilton, Santa Fe, Mexico City
- Broadcaster: MVS TV • Telemax
- Entrants: 15
- Placements: 5
- Winner: Aldo Esparza; Diego Garcy

Mister México 2016 is the first edition of the Mister México pageant, created by Hugo Castellanos after Lupita Jones, president of El Modelo México, lost the Mister World franchise. The competition was held on June 11, 2016 in Mexico City.

Aldo Esparza of Jalisco was crowned as Mister World Mexico 2016, the first winner under the new franchise. He represented Mexico at Mister World 2016, held in London, England on July 19, 2016 where he finished as second runner-up.

Diego Garcy of Jalisco was announced as Mister Supranational Mexico 2016, the first titleholder under the new franchise. He represented Mexico at Mister Supranational 2016, held in Krynica-Zdrój, Poland on December 3, 2016 where he become the first ever winner of the Mister Supranational competition and winning the first title for the country.

== Results ==
=== Placements ===
Color keys

- Declared as winner
- Ended as runner-up or top 5/6 qualification
- Ended as one of the finalists or semifinalists
- Ended did not place

=== Mister World Mexico ===
Placement	Contestant	International Placement
Mister World Mexico 2016	Jalisco – Aldo Esparza Ramírez	2nd Runner-Up – Mister World 2016
1st Runner-Up	Sinaloa – Rafael Armando Chávez	
2nd Runner-Up	Yucatán – Mauricio Cuevas Arouesty	
Top 5	Ciudad de México – David Ortega	Winner – Mister Mesoamerica 2017
Top 5	Estado de México – Erick Bolivar	

=== Mister Supranational Mexico ===
Title	Contestant	International Placement
Mister Supranational Mexico 2016	Jalisco – Diego Garcy	Winner – Mister Supranational 2016

== Official Contestant ==
15 contestant competed for the title:

State	Contestant	Age	Height
Baja California	Miguel Montaño Camberos	24	1.86 m (6 ft 1 in)
Chiapas	Jorge Ramos	25	1.83 m (6 ft 0 in)
Ciudad de México	David Ortega Hurtado	27	1.82 m (5 ft 11 1/2 in)
Durango	Fernando Valenzuela	21	1.92 m (6 ft 3 1/2 in)
Estado de México	Erick Bolivar	22	1.94 m (6 ft 4 1/2 in)
Guanajuato	Jonathan Hurtado Zuñiga	27	1.90 m (6 ft 3 in)
Jalisco	Aldo Esparza Ramírez	26	1.85 m (6 ft 1 in)
Nuevo León	Eugenio Treviño	26	1.87 m (6 ft 1 1/2 in)
Puebla	Arturo Beltrán	23	1.90 m (6 ft 3 in)
Sinaloa	Rafael Armando Chávez	25	1.90 m (6 ft 3 in)
Sonora	Mario Montaño	26	1.89 m (6 ft 2 1/2 in)
Tabasco	Francisco Folaz	21	1.82 m (5 ft 11 1/2 in)
Tamaulipas	Oscar Saldaña	27	1.81 m (5 ft 11 1/2 in)
Veracruz	Medarno Vázquez	27	1.89 m (6 ft 2 1/2 in)
Yucatán	Mauricio Cuevas Arouesty	26	1.81 m (5 ft 11 1/2 in)

Notes

- David Ortega Hurtado won the Mr Mesoamerica 2017 title in Guatemala City, Guatemala.
- Miguel Montaño Camberos placed as Top 10 in Mr Real Universe 2015 in Guayaquil, Ecuador.
- Rafael Armando Chávez won the Mr Universe Model 2013 title in Santiago de los Caballeros, Dominican Republic.
