= Moisés Peñaloza =

Mexican actor and model

- Born: Jonathan Moisés Sierra Peñaloza; October 22, 1991 (age 35); Tampico, Tamaulipas
- Occupations: Actor and model
- Height: 1.85 m (6 ft 1 in)
- Title: Mister México 2022

Jonathan Moisés Sierra Peñaloza is a Mexican actor and model who won Mister Mexico and represented his country at the Mister Supranational pageant, where he finished as third runner-up.

== Life and education ==
Peñaloza was born on October 22, 1991 in Tampico, Tamaulipas. He began his formal theater training by attending the at the Instituto Tamaulipeco para la Cultura y las Artes (ITCA). In 2015, he enrolled in the Centro de Educación Artística (CEA) of Televisa, where he trained in acting for two years until 2017.

== Career ==
Peñaloza started with guest appearances in popular series such as Vecinos and Una familia de diez in 2019, followed by roles in anthology shows like La rosa de Guadalupe and Como dice el dicho. His career gained momentum in the early 2020s with recurring parts in Diseñando tu amor (2021) and Si nos dejan (2021), leading to major roles in long-running telenovelas including Minas de pasión (2023–2024) and El ángel de Aurora (2024–2025). Peñaloza has also built a following as a social media personality, sharing fashion and lifestyle.

=== Pageantry ===
In 2022, Peñaloza represented Mexico at the Mister Supranational pageant in Krynica-Zdrój, Poland. During the competition, he won the Top Model and Mister Personality awards. At the end of the event, he finished as third runner-up.

Awards and achievements
Preceded by (Nepal) Santosh Upadhyaya	Mister Supranational 3rd Runner-up; 2022	Succeeded by (Korea) Lee Yong–woo
Preceded by (Sinaloa) Gustavo Rosas	Mister México; 2022	Succeeded by (Jalisco) Luis Cuadra
