= Mister Supranational 2023 =

7th Mister Supranational beauty pageant

- Date: 15 July 2023
- Presenters: Jo-Ann Strauss; Martin Fitch
- Venue: Strzelecki Park Amphitheater, Nowy Sącz, Małopolska, Poland
- Broadcaster: Polsat
- Entrants: 34
- Placements: 20
- Debuts: Cameroon; Malaysia; Zimbabwe
- Withdrawals: Dominican Republic; El Salvador; Germany; Ghana; Haiti; Laos; Malta; Mauritius; Vietnam
- Returns: Canada; Equatorial Guinea; India; Slovakia; South Africa
- Winner: Iván Álvarez Guedes; Spain
- Photogenic: Daniel Tracz (Poland)

Mister Supranational 2023 the seventh edition of the Mister Supranational pageant which was held on 15 July 2023 at Strzelecki Park Amphitheater in Nowy Sącz, Poland. Luis Daniel Gálvez of Cuba crowned Iván Álvarez Guedes of Spain as his successor at the end of the event. This was the first time that Spain had won this pageant, and the first European country to do so.

== Background ==
Starting in 2023, the Miss Supranational Organization has decided to accept men from the ages of 18 to 34 years old to participate in the pageant.

=== Selection of participants ===
Contestants from 34 countries and territories were selected to compete in the 2023 edition.

The 2023 edition will witness the debut of Cameroon, Ghana, Malaysia, Nigeria, and Zimbabwe; and the returns of Canada, Equatorial Guinea, India, Sierra Leone, Slovakia, and South Africa. Canada and Equatorial Guinea last competed in 2019, while the others last competed in 2021. Haiti withdrew from this edition because of the current political situation happening in the country. El Salvador, Germany, Laos, Malta, Mauritius and Vietnam withdrew for unknown reasons.

Contestants were officially confirmed to compete for Mister Supranational 2023 during The Sashing Ceremony which was broadcast live from Nowy Sącz, Malopolska via Mister Supranational official YouTube on 4 July 2023. Delegates from Dominican Republic, Equatorial Guinea, Ghana, Nigeria, Sierra Leone, and Zimbabwe were no show during the presentation; official count of 32 delegates as of 4 July 2023.

Delegates from the Dominican Republic and Sierra Leone had to withdraw due to Polish visa issues, and delegates from Ghana and Nigeria did no-shows in Poland; they all took part in Supra Chat with Misters 2023.

=== Presenters ===
On 2 June 2023, the President of the Miss Supranational Organization, Gerhard Parzutka von Lipinski, announced Jo-Ann Strauss as the host for the Miss and Mister Supranational 2023 Final Shows. Martin Fitch returned as host and be joining Strauss on the finals with backstage coverage by Ivan Podrez.

- Ivan Podrez, presenter of the Mister Supranational challenges
- Jo-Ann Strauss, model, television host, and entrepreneur
- Martin Fitch, presenter and actor

=== Panel of experts ===
The Preliminary competition was broadcast live on the official Mister Supranational YouTube channel at 7:30 pm CET on 11 July 2023.

- Luis Daniel Gálvez – Mister Supranational 2022 from Cuba
- Srinidhi Shetty – Miss Supranational 2016 from India
- Adinda Cresheilla – Miss Supranational 2022 3rd runner-up from Indonesia (only as preliminary judge)
- Andre Sleigh – Creative director of the Miss and Mister Supranational (only as preliminary judge)
- Lalela Mswane – Miss Supranational 2022 from South Africa (only as preliminary judge)

The final show was broadcast live on the official Mister Supranational YouTube channel at 8.05 pm CET on 15 July 2023.

- Andrea Aguilera – Miss Supranational 2023 from Ecuador (only on the final telecast)
- Gerhard Patzutka Von Lipinski – president of the Miss and Mister Supranational organisation (only on the final telecast)
- Marcelina Zawadzka – television host, model and Miss Polonia 2011 (only on the final telecast)
- Robert Czepiel – General director of Jubiler Schubert / World of Amber (only on the final telecast)
- Shontelle – singer and songwriter from Barbados (only on the final telecast)

== Results ==
=== Placement ===
Placements announced by the organizers are as follows:

Placement	Contestant
Mister Supranational 2023	Spain – Iván Álvarez Guedes
1st Runner-up	Brazil – Henrique Martins
2nd Runner-up	Netherlands – Luca Derin
3rd Runner-up	South Korea – Lee Yong–woo ∆
4th Runner-up	Cameroon – Daniel Mbouda
Top 10 (in order of placements)	Mexico – Luis Cuadra; Czech Republic – Jakub Vitek; Ecuador – Bruno Barbieri; Thailand – Nathanon Narathanyawirun; Malaysia – Danial Hansen ∆ §
Top 20 (in order of placements)	United States – Daniel Zemeida; Italy – Fabio Camattari; France – Quentin Bourg-Austruy; Panama – Mario Bianco; South Africa – Tylo Ribeiro; Poland – Daniel Tracz; Indonesia – Adib Dwitamma; Philippines – Johannes Rissler; Canada – Luis Portelles ∆; Trinidad and Tobago – Keathon Yallery
Top 25 (Non semifinalist) (in order of placements)	Venezuela – Jorge Eduardo Nuñez; Peru – Stefano Bermellón; Argentina – Giuliano Fessía; Belgium – Ben Steyaert; India – Raj Sunil Singh

Notes:

§ – placed into the Top 10 by Supra Fan Vote Winner

∆ – placed into the Top 20 by fast-track challenges

=== Continental titleholders ===
It was awarded to delegates with the highest placement in the continent without being in the Top 5.

Continent	Contestant	Ref.
Africa	South Africa – Tylo Ribeiro	
Americas	Mexico – Luis Cuadra	
Asia	Thailand – Nathanon Narathanyawirun	
Caribbean	Trinidad and Tobago – Keathon Yallery	
Europeg	Czech Republic – Jakub Vitek	

=== Special awards ===
Final Results		Contestant	Ref.
FAST-TRACKS	Supra Fan Vote	Malaysia – Danial Hansen	
FAST-TRACKS	Mister Influencer	Malaysia – Danial Hansen	
FAST-TRACKS	Supra Chat	Canada – Luis Portelles	
FAST-TRACKS	Top Model	South Korea – Lee Yong–woo	
SPECIAL AWARDS	Mister Personality	Peru – Stefano Bermellón	
SPECIAL AWARDS	Mister Photogenic	Poland – Daniel Tracz	
SPECIAL AWARDS	Mister Talent	India – Raj Sunil Singh	

== Challenge events ==
All times in this article are Central European Time (UTC+1)

=== Fast track events ===
==== Supra Fan-Vote ====
The winner of the Supra Fan Vote will automatically advance to the Top 10 finalists of Mister Supranational 2023. Voting will open till the finals night on 15 July 2023.

Results	Country	Ref.
Winner	Malaysia – Danial Hansen	

==== Top Model ====
Top Model was broadcast live via Mister Supranational official YouTube at 8 pm on 9 July 2023. One of the three finalists will be announced as the winner and be a semi-finalist in the finals.

Final results	Country	Ref.
Winner	South Korea – Lee Yong-woo	
Top 3	Cameroon – Daniel Mbouda; Spain – Iván Álvarez Guedes	
Top 10	Belgium – Ben Steyaert; Brazil – Henrique Martins; Czech Republic – Jakub Vitek; Mexico – Luis Cuadra; Netherlands – Luca Derin; Philippines – Johannes Rissler; Poland – Daniel Tracz	

==== Mister Supra Influencer ====
The Mister Influencer challenges started on 29 June 2023, at 3:00 pm. The first social media challenge began on their official YouTube channel and their Facebook page on 1 July. One of the three finalists will be the winner and announced as a Top 20 finalist.

Results		Country
Winner		Malaysia – Danial Hansen
Top 3	Challenge 1 (Youtube)	Indonesia – Adib Dwitamma
Top 3	Challenge 2 (Facebook)	Mexico – Luis Cuadra
Top 3	Challenge 3 (Instagram)	Malaysia – Danial Hansen

==== Supra Chat ====
Ivan Padrez returned as the host for Supra Chat 2023 Series. The voting duration in each episode will last for 48 hours.

===== Round 1 =====
Supra Chat 2023 Episode 1 premiered on Mister Supranational official YouTube channel on 21 June 2023.

- Advanced to second round

Group	Country 1	Country 2	Country 3	Country 4	Country 5	Country 6	Country 7	Country 8
1	Belgium	Greece	Namibia	Netherlands	~~Nigeria~~	Poland	South Africa	Zimbabwe
2	Argentina	Brazil	Canada	~~Dominican Republic~~	Ecuador	Equatorial Guinea	Spain	Trinidad and Tobago
3	Cameroon	Czech Republic	France	~~Ghana~~	Italy	~~Sierra Leone~~	Slovakia	—N/a
4	Cuba	Mexico	Panama	Peru	Puerto Rico	United States	Venezuela	—N/a
5	Cambodia	India	Indonesia	Korea	Malaysia	Nepal	Philippines	Thailand

Notes

- Dominican Republic withdrew due to Polish visa issues.
- Ghana withdrew with a no-show in Poland.
- Nigeria withdrew with a no-show in Poland.
- Sierra Leone withdrew due to Polish visa issues.

===== Finals =====
The five semi-finalists competed in the final round of Supra Chat—the winner advanced as a Top 20 finalist.

Final	Country	Ref.
Winner	Canada – Luis Portelles	
Top 5	Cameroon – Daniel Mbouda; Cuba – Richard Acosta; Malaysia – Danial Hansen; South Africa – Tylo Ribeiro	

=== Non-fast track events ===
==== Mister Talent ====
10 Talent entries were presented on the Mister Supranational official YouTube channel on 1 July, and votes were cast. The final four competed in the first Supra Talent 2023 finals with Miss Supranational 2023 Talent Finalists which was broadcast live via Miss & Mister Supranational official YouTube at 10 pm on 9 July 2023. Mister Philippines, Johannes Rissler and Mister Peru, Stefano Bermellón were invited to perform with the finalists.

Final results	Country	Ref.
Winner	India – Raj Sunil Singh	
Top 4	Ecuador – Bruno Barbieri; Indonesia – Adib Dwitamma; Nepal – Shishir Wagle	
Top 10	Cuba – Richard Acosta; Czech Republic – Jakub Vitek; ~~Dominican Republic – Jan Carlos Carrasco~~; Peru – Stefano Bermellón; Thailand – Nathanon Narathanyawirun; Trinidad and Tobago – Keathon Yallery	

== Contestants ==
Contestants were officially confirmed to compete for Mister Supranational 2023 during The Sashing Ceremony which was broadcast live from Nowy Sącz, Malopolska via Mister Supranational official YouTube on 4 July 2023. Delegates from Equatorial Guinea and Zimbabwe were absent during the presentation.

Country/Territory	Delegate	Age (Note: Ages at the time of the pageant)	Hometown	Continental Group
Argentina	Giuliano Fessia	33	Buenos Aires	Americas
Belgium	Ben Steyaert	26	Brussels	Europe
Brazil	Henrique Martins	31	Campinas	Americas
Cambodia	Sela Vorn	25	Pursat	Asia
Cameroon	Daniel Mbouda	25	Yaoundé	Africa
Canada	Luis Portelles	28	Montreal	Americas
Cuba	Richard Acosta	27	Havana	Caribbean
Czech Republic	Jakub Vitek	29	Bratislava	Europe
Ecuador	Bruno Barbieri	31	Guayaquil	Americas
Equatorial Guinea	Vicente Benjamín Roku	19	Malabo	Africa
France	Quentin Bourg-Austruy	24	Issy-les-Moulineaux	Europe
Greece	Michalis Kolikas	27	Athens	Europe
India	Raj Sunil Singh	22	Mumbai	Asia
Indonesia	Adib Dwitamma	24	Palembang	Asia
Italy	Fabio Camattari	25	Venice	Europe
Malaysia	Danial Hansen	28	Kuala Lumpur	Asia
Mexico	Luis Cuadra	30	Lázaro Cárdenas	Americas
Namibia	Malan van den Berg	25	Windhoek	Africa
Nepal	Shishir Wagle	24	Tanahu	Asia
Netherlands	Luca Derin	26	Sittard	Europe
Panama	Mario Bianco	28	Chiriquí	Americas
Peru	Stefano Bermellón	28	Lima	Americas
Philippines	Johannes Rissler	24	Panabo	Asia
Poland	Daniel Tracz	25	Jordanów Śląski	Europe
Puerto Rico	Rafael Pagán	30	Arecibo	Caribbean
Slovakia	Tomáš Benko	30	Žilina	Europe
South Africa	Tylo Ribeiro	30	Gauteng	Africa
South Korea	Lee Yong-woo	33	Seoul	Asia
Spain	Iván Álvarez Guedes	30	Pontevedra	Europe
Thailand	Nathanon Narathanyawirun	29	Nakhon Si Thammarat	Asia
Trinidad and Tobago	Keathon Yallery	27	Saint Augustine	Caribbean
United States	Daniel Zemeida	23	Peoria	Americas
Venezuela	Jorge Eduardo Núñez	28	Cabimas	Americas
Zimbabwe	Tatenda Njanike	27	Harare	Africa

== Notes ==
=== Debuts ===
- Cameroon
- Malaysia
- Zimbabwe

=== Returns ===
Last competed in 2019:

- Canada
- Equatorial Guinea

Last competed in 2021:

- India
- Slovakia
- South Africa

=== Withdrawals ===
- Dominican Republic — Jan Carlos Carrasco participated in Episode 2 of Supra Chat with Misters 2023 but withdrew due to Polish visa issues.
- El Salvador
- Germany
- Ghana — Is-Haq Abubakar participated in Episode 3 of Supra Chat with Misters 2023 with a no-show in Poland.
- Haiti
- Laos
- Malta
- Mauritius
- Nigeria — Gideon Anieti Nwawo participated in Episode 1 of Supra Chat with Misters 2023 with a no-show in Poland.
- Sierra Leone — Uthman Issa Bangura participated in Episode 3 of Supra Chat with Misters 2023 but withdrew due to Polish visa issues. He competed in the next edition of Mister Supranational.
- Vietnam
