= Mister Supranational 2025 =

9th Mister Supranational pageant, beauty pageant edition

- Date: 28 June 2025
- Presenters: Davina Reeves; Nico Panagio; Aleksander Sikora; Luis Portelles; Dani Walker
- Entertainment: Katarzyna Sawczuk; BeMy; Zach Day; Kaeyra; Jan Majewski
- Venue: Strzelecki Park Amphitheater, Nowy Sącz, Lesser Poland, Poland
- Broadcaster: TV 4; YouTube
- Entrants: 38
- Placements: 20
- Debuts: Hong Kong; Macau; Nigeria
- Withdrawals: Argentina; Côte d'Ivoire; Cuba; Germany; Guatemala; Haiti; Ireland; Laos; Paraguay; Slovakia
- Returns: Belgium; Cambodia; Cameroon; China; Curaçao; France; Namibia
- Winner: Swann Lavigne; France
- Congeniality: Luca Pontiggia; South Africa

Mister Supranational 2025 was the ninth edition of the Mister Supranational pageant, held at the Strzelecki Park Amphitheater in Nowy Sącz, Poland, on 28 June 2025.

Fezile Mkhize of South Africa crowned Swann Lavigne of France as his successor at the end of the event. This was the first time that France had won this pageant, and the second European country to do so.

== Background ==
=== Location and date ===
On 14 March 2025, Gerhard Parzutka von Lipinski, the president of the Mister Supranational Organization, announced that the 9th edition of Mister Supranational will take place on June 28, 2025 at Malopolska, Poland.

=== Selection of contestants ===
Contestants from 38 countries and territories were selected to compete for the 2025 edition.

==== Replacements ====
Daniel Purwandi of Indonesia was set to compete this edition, but stepped down from the title for unknown reasons. He was later replaced by Mustanir Afif.

Ugochukwu Nwokolo withdrew for undisclosed reasons. The Mr. Nigeria organization later replaced Michael-Mazi Michael as the new titleholder.

Jérémy Canizares was crowned as Mister Supranational France. However, he relinquish his title due to work commitments. Ten days later, the Mister National France organization later appointed Swann Lavigne as the new representative, who subsequently won the title of Mister Supranational 2025.

Hà Quang Anh Trung was appointed to compete this edition. However, he relinquish his title due to his injury. He was later replaced by Nguyễn Minh Khắc.

==== Debuts, returns, and withdrawals ====
This edition will mark the debuts of Hong Kong, Macau, and Nigeria; and will also feature the returns of Belgium, Cambodia, China, Curaçao, Ireland and Namibia.

Belgium, Cambodia, Cameroon, France, and Namibia last competed in 2023; while China and Curaçao last competed in 2018.

Argentina, Côte d'Ivoire, Germany, Guatemala, Haiti, Laos, Paraguay, and Slovakia withdrew after their respective organizations failed to appoint a delegate, hold a national competition, or lost their national franchise.

Additionally, Andrés Iyanga Merino of Equatorial Guinea and Erusha Gimshan of Sri Lanka, who were expected to participate, had no-shows in Poland; both had taken part of the Supra Chat Challenge 2025.

Glenn Williamson of Ireland withdrew before the finale, citing critical health issues.

== Results ==
=== Placements ===
Placement	Contestant
Mister Supranational 2025	France – Swann Lavigne ∆ ‡
1st Runner-Up	Curaçao – Zuemerik Veeris
2nd Runner-Up	Mexico – Mauricio Calvo
3rd Runner-Up	Nigeria – Michael Mazi-Michael ★
4th Runner-Up	Philippines – Kenneth Cabungcal
Top 10	Czech Republic – Tomas Haring; Indonesia – Mustanir Afif ∆; Puerto Rico – Anthony Delgado; Venezuela – Víctor Battista; Vietnam – Nguyễn Minh Khắc
Top 20	Canada – Daniel Rodríguez; China – Haoyong Qin; Hong Kong – Wei Zihong; India – Shubham Sharma ∆; Namibia – Mmoloki Samoka; Netherlands – Anthony Henricus; Poland – Adam Wyszyński; South Africa – Luca Pontiggia ∆; Spain – Pablo Herrera; Thailand – Piyapong Kammeesawang

Note:

^∆ Automatically qualified for the top 20 finalists after winning fast-track challenges.

^★ Automatically qualified for the top 10 finalists after winning the "Supra Fan Vote".

^‡ Automatically qualified for the top 20 finalists chosen as "the Candidate's Choice" (chosen by fellow contestants).

=== Continental titleholders ===
The award was presented to representatives with the highest ranking within the continent, excluding those in the Top 5.

Continent/Region	Contestant
Africa	South Africa – Luca Pontiggia
Americas	Venezuela – Víctor Battista
Asia	Indonesia – Mustanir Afif
Caribbean	Puerto Rico – Anthony Delgado
Europe	Czech Republic – Tomas Haring

=== Special awards ===
Award	Contestant
Friendship	South Africa – Luca Pontiggia
Fitness	China – Haoyong Qin
Talent	South Korea – Lee Seung Chan
Influencer	India – Shubham Sharma
Supra Chat	South Africa – Luca Pontiggia
Supra Model of The Year	France – Swann Lavigne
Supra Fan Vote	Nigeria – Michael Mazi
Candidates' Choice	France – Swann Lavigne
From The Ground Up	Indonesia - Mustanir Afif

== Challenge events ==
=== Fast track events ===
==== Supra Chat ====
The Supra Chat with contestants was premiered on April 23, 2025, and was broadcast on the official YouTube channel of Mister Supranational. During the event, contestants were grouped into clusters of four to six, where they individually presented themselves. There were six groups, with winners from each group will advance to the final round of the challenge.

- Advanced to the semi-finals

Group	Country or territory						Ref.
1	Cambodia	China	India	Indonesia	South Korea	Vietnam (Note: Hà Quang Anh Trung, withdrew from the competition.)	
2	Belgium	Curaçao	Czech Republic	Jamaica	Namibia	Netherlands	
3	Dominican Republic	Ecuador	Mexico	Peru	Spain	Venezuela	
4	Colombia	Equatorial Guinea	France	Nigeria	Poland	Puerto Rico	
5	Brazil	Canada	Malta	Sierra Leone	South Africa	Trinidad and Tobago	
6	Cameroon	Myanmar	Nepal	Philippines	Sri Lanka	—N/a	

==== Final round ====
- Advanced to the Top 20 via Supra Chat

Results	Country
Winner	South Africa – Luca Pontiggia
Top 6	China – Haoyong Qin; Mexico – Mauricio Calvo; Namibia – Mmoloki Samoka; Nigeria – Michael Mazi-Michael; Philippines – Kenneth Cabungcal

==== Mister Influencer Opportunity ====
The participant with the highest overall performance in the challenge will automatically be advanced to become one of the Top 20 semifinalists in the final round.

- Advanced to the Top 20 via Mister Influencer Opportunity

Placement	Contestant
Winner	India – Shubham Sharma

==== Supra Fan-Vote ====
The Supra Fan-Vote event commenced on June 19, 2025, and will conclude on the day of the finals. The recipient of the most votes in the Supra Fan Vote was directly promoted to the Top 10 of Mister Supranational 2025. The voting period occurred prior to the final evening and closed before the start of the finals. The definitive ranking of the leaderboard will disclose on June 28 ahead of the finals night.

- Advanced to the Top 10 via Supra Fan-vote

Placement	Contestant
Winner	Nigeria – Michael Mazi
Top 10	China – Haoyong Qin; Colombia – Cristian Pérez; France – Swann Lavigne; Indonesia – Mustanir Afif; Jamaica – Shevauni Powell; Philippines – Kenneth Cabungcal; Spain – Pablo Herrera; Thailand – Piyapong Kammeesawang; Venezuela – Víctor Battista

==== Supra Model of the Year ====
On June 23, 2025, the Supra Model of the Year contest was live-streamed on the official Miss Supranational YouTube channel at 8:30 PM. At the finals, one of the three finalists will be announced as the semi-finalist progressing to the final round.

- Advanced to the Top 20 via Supra Model of the Year

Placement	Contestant
Winner	France – Swann Lavigne
Top 3	Curaçao – Zuemerik Veeris; Mexico – Mauricio Calvo
Top 10	Czech Republic – Tomas Haring; India – Shubham Sharma; Indonesia – Mustanir Afif; Netherlands – Anthony Henricus; Nigeria – Michael Mazi; Puerto Rico – Anthony Delgado; Spain – Pablo Herrera

=== Non-fast track events ===
==== Mister Talent ====
On June 21, five talent entries will showcase on the official YouTube channel of Mister Supranational, and subsequent votes were cast. The Supra Talent Finals will stream live on the Miss Supranational official YouTube channel on June 23, 2025.

Results	Country
Winner	South Korea – Lee Seung Chan
Top 5	Cameroon – Gaetan Engamba; Curaçao – Zuemerik Veeris; Nepal – Cyrus Bishwakarma; Nigeria – Michael Mazi

== Contestants ==
Thirty-eight contestants competed for the title:

Country/Territory	Contestant	Age (Note: Ages at the time of the pageant.)	Hometown	Continental Group
Belgium	Somar Alsaho	24	Brussels	Europe
Brazil	Igor Thierry	24	Manaus	Americas
Cambodia	Seanghuy Heab	31	Battambang	Asia
Cameroon	Gaetan Engamba	33	Yaounde	Africa
Canada	Daniel Rodriguez	29	Maturín	Americas
China	Haoyong Qin	32	Linfen	Asia
Colombia	Cristian Pérez	28	Barranquilla	Americas
Curaçao	Zuemerik Veeris	33	Willemstad	Caribbean
Czech Republic	Tomas Haring	31	Prague	Europe
Dominican Republic	Stanley Castellanos	22	Mao	Caribbean
Ecuador	Andrey Soliz	30	Ibarra	Americas
France	Swann Lavigne	25	Taulignan	Europe
Hong Kong	Wei Zihong	25	Sichuan	Asia
India	Shubham Sharma	24	Mumbai	Asia
Indonesia	Mustanir Afif	30	Banda Aceh	Asia
Jamaica	Shevauni Powell	31	Manchester	Caribbean
Macau	Zhengqi Ai	30	Shenzhen	Asia
Malaysia	Leon Lo	34	Kota Kinabalu	Asia
Malta	Slaven Micallef	27	Naxxar	Europe
Mexico	Mauricio Calvo	29	Guadalajara	Americas
Myanmar	Hlaing Bwar	22	Mawlamyine	Asia
Namibia	Mmoloki Samoka	28	Windhoek	Africa
Nepal	Cyrus Bishwakarma	22	Kathmandu	Asia
Netherlands	Anthony Henricus	22	Rotterdam	Europe
Nigeria	Michael Mazi-Michael	26	Abagana	Africa
Peru	Eleazar Moreno	32	Lima	Americas
Philippines	Kenneth Cabungcal	25	Dumaguete	Asia
Poland	Adam Wyszyński	32	Warsaw	Europe
Puerto Rico	Anthony Delgado	26	Arecibo	Caribbean
South Africa	Luca Pontiggia	34	Johannesburg	Africa
South Korea	Lee Seung Chan	32	Seoul	Asia
Sierra Leone	Ibrahim Imram Kamara	29	Freetown	Africa
Spain	Pablo Herrera	33	Murcia	Europe
Thailand	Piyapong Kammeesawang	32	Phrae	Asia
Trinidad and Tobago	Le Vaun Oliver	27	Arima	Caribbean
United States	Christopher Hayden Cox	32	Honolulu	Americas
Venezuela	Víctor Battista	29	Caracas	Americas
Vietnam	Nguyễn Minh Khắc	33	Ho Chi Minh City	Asia
