= Luis Cuadra =

Mexican model and male pageant titleholder

- Born: Luis Carlos García Cuadra; February 21, 1993 (age 33); Uruapan, Michoacán
- Education: Universidad Autónoma de Guadalajara
- Occupations: Model, Dental surgeon
- Height: 1.83 m (6 ft 0 in)
- Beauty pageant titleholder
- Hair color: Black
- Eye color: Hazel
- Major competitions: Mister Jalisco 2023; (Winner); Mister México 2023; (Winner); Mister Supranational 2023; (Top 10); (Mister Supranational Americas)

Luis Carlos García Cuadra is a Mexican model, dental surgeon and pageant titleholder who won Mister Mexico and represented his country at the Mister Supranational pageant, where he placed Top 10.

== Early life and education ==
Cuadra was born on February 21, 1993, in Uruapan, Michoacán. After completing secondary school, he moved to Guadalajara, where he studied dentistry at the Universidad Autónoma de Guadalajara. He later opened his own private dental practice in the Guadalajara metropolitan area.

== Pegeantry ==
Cuadra received the title of Mister Jalisco 2023, thus gaining the responsibility of representing her state in the Mister México pageant, which would be held in May of the same year. He competed in the fourth edition of Mister México 2023, held on May 27, 2023 at the Teatro Francisco Javier Clavijero in Puerto de Veracruz. At the end of the event, he crowned by the outgoing titleholder, Moisés Peñaloza of Tamaulipas.

Cuadra represented Mexico at the seventh edition of Mister Supranational 2023, held on July 15, 2023 at Strzelecki Park Amphitheater, Nowy Sącz, Małopolska, Poland. At the end of the event, Luis ended up as one of the Top 10 finalists (ranked sixth) and was awarded the title of Mister Supranational Americas.

Awards and achievements
Preceded by (Brazil) Guilherme Werner	Mister Supranational Americas; 2023	Succeeded by (Colombia) Rafael Rapelo
Preceded by (Tamaulipas) Moisés Peñaloza	Mister México; 2023	Succeeded by (Coahuila) Zait Reza
