= Mister Supranational 2022 =

6th Mister Supranational pageant, beauty pageant edition

- Date: 16 July 2022
- Theme: Aspirational • Inspirational
- Venue: Strzelecki Park Amphitheater, Nowy Sącz, Małopolska, Poland
- Broadcaster: Polsat; Globovisión; Trinidad and Tobago Television
- Entrants: 34
- Placements: 20
- Debuts: Cambodia; Cuba; El Salvador; Italy; Mauritius; Namibia
- Withdrawals: Aruba; Colombia; India; Morocco; North Macedonia; Romania; Sierra Leone; Singapore; Slovakia; South Africa; Togo
- Returns: Argentina; Germany; Laos; Trinidad and Tobago; Vietnam
- Winner: Luis Daniel Gálvez; Cuba
- Congeniality: Giuseppe Santagata (Italy)
- Photogenic: Heriberto Rivera (Puerto Rico)

Mister Supranational 2022 was the sixth edition of the Mister Supranational, held on July 16, 2022 at Strzelecki Park Amphitheater in Nowy Sącz, Poland. Varo Vargas of Peru crowned Luis Daniel Gálvez of Cuba at the end of the event. This edition marked the first delegate from Caribbean to win Mister Supranational.

== Background ==
=== Location and date ===
On 26 April 2022, Gerhard Parzutka von Lipinski, the president of Miss and Mister Supranational, announced that 13th edition of the Miss Supranational competition will return to Nowy Sacz in the Małopolska region this June and July, the final night will be held on July 15, 2022.

=== Presenters ===
Anita Nneka Jones returned as host and joined by Martin Fitch, with backstage coverage by Ivan Podrez.

- Ivan Podrez, presenter of the Mister Supranational challenges
- Anita Nneka Jones, presenter for Sky News, BBC Radio London and Premier League
- Martin Fitch, presenter and actor

=== Panel of Experts ===
The Preliminary Competition was broadcast live on the official Mister Supranational YouTube channel at 11pm CET on July 12, 2022. Panel of Experts were announced.

- Anntonia Porsild – Miss Supranational 2019 from Thailand
- Varo Vargas – Mister Supranational 2021 from Peru
- Gerhard Patzutka Von Lipinski – President of the Nowa Scena organisation (only on the final telecast)
- Katarzyna Krzeszowska – Miss Polski 2012 from Poland (only on the final telecast)
- Lalela Mswane – Miss Supranational 2022 from South Africa (only on the final telecast)
- Magda Karwacka, TV presenter from Poland (only on the final telecast)
- Marzena Rogalska, Model and TV presenter from Poland (only on the final telecast)
- Mateusz Nowogrodzki, President of Jubiler Schubert from Poland (only on the final telecast)
- Andre Sleigh – Creative Director of the Miss and Mister Supranational (only as preliminary judge)
- Chanique Rabe – Miss Supranational 2021 from Namibia (only as preliminary judge)
- Eoanna Constanza – Miss Supranational 2021 4th Runner-up from Dominican Republic (only as preliminary judge)
- Valentina Sánchez – Miss Supranational 2021 3rd Runner-up from Venezuela (only as preliminary judge)
- Valeria Vazquez Latorre – Miss Supranational 2018 from Puerto Rico and ambassador for Jubiler Schubert (only as preliminary judge)

== Results ==
=== Placements ===
Placement	Contestant
Mister Supranational 2022	Cuba – Luis Daniel Gálvez
1st Runner-up	Indonesia – Matthew Gilbert Wibowo
2nd Runner-up	Greece – Leonidas Amfilochios
3rd Runner-up	Mexico – Moisés Peñaloza Δ
4th Runner-up	Puerto Rico – Heriberto Rivera
Top 10 (in order of placements)	Vietnam – Bùi Xuân Đạt; France – Pierre Bondon; Brazil – Guilherme Werner; El Salvador – Adrián Itzam Monge; Thailand – Teenarupakorn Muangmai §
Top 20 (in order of placements)	South Korea – Han Jung-wan Δ; Argentina – Angel Olaya; Belgium – Yentl van Hoorbeke; Peru – Nicola Roberto; Trinidad and Tobago – Wynter Mason; Spain – Manuel Ndele; Italy – Giuseppe Santagata Δ; Philippines – RaÉd Fernandez Al-Zghayér; Dominican Republic – Lewis Echavarria; Venezuela – Anthony Gallardo
Top 24 Non-Semifinalist (in order of placements)	United States – Keith Williams; Nepal – Sanish Shrestha; Ecuador – Alberto Arroyo; Czech Republic – Jiří Perout

Notes:
§ – placed into the Top 10 by fan-voting challenge
Δ – placed into the Top 20 by fast-track challenges

=== Continental Titleholders ===
It was awarded to delegates with the highest placement in the continent without being in the Top 5.

Continent	Contestant	Ref.
Africa	Namibia – Jean-Louis Knouwds	
Americas	Brazil – Guilherme Werner	
Asia	Vietnam – Bùi Xuân Đạt	
Caribbean	Trinidad and Tobago – Wynter Mason	
Europe	France – Pierre Bondon	

=== Special awards ===
§ – placed into the Top 10 by Supra Fan Vote Winner
Δ – placed into the Top 20 by fast-track challenges

Awards	Contestant	Ref.
§ Supra Fan Vote	Thailand – Teenarupakorn Muangmai	
Δ Mister Influencer	Italy – Giuseppe Santagata	
Δ Supra Chat	South Korea – Han Jung-wan	
Δ Supra Model	Mexico – Moisés Peñaloza	
Mister Fitness	France – Pierre Bondon	
Mister Friendship	Italy – Giuseppe Santagata	
Mister Personality	Mexico – Moisés Peñaloza	
Mister Photogenic	Puerto Rico – Heriberto Rivera	
Mister Talent	Nepal – Sanish Shrestha	

== Challenge events ==
=== Supra Fan-Vote ===
The winner of the Supra Fan Vote will automatically advance to the Top 10 finalists of Mister Supranational 2022.

Final results	Country	Ref.
Winner	Thailand – Teenarupakorn Muangmai	
Top 10	Argentina – Angel Olaya; Cuba – Luis Daniel Gálvez; Ecuador – Alberto Arroyo; Germany – Marco Bauer; Haiti – Mendossa Désir; Italy – Giuseppe Santagata; Peru – Nicola Roberto; Puerto Rico – Heriberto Rivera; United States – Keith Williams	

=== Supra Influencer ===
The winner of the Supra Influencer will automatically advance to the Top 20 finalists of Mister Supranational 2022.

Final results	Country	Ref.
Winner	Italy – Giuseppe Santagata	
Top 12	Argentina – Angel Olaya; Belgium – Yentl van Hoorbeke; Czech Republic – Jiří Perout; Ecuador – Alberto Arroyo; France – Pierre Bondon; Indonesia – Matthew Gilbert Wibowo; Italy – Giuseppe Santagata; South Korea – Han Jung-wan; Malta – Ron Bonsfiled; Nepal – Sanish Shrestha; Thailand – Teenarupakorn Muangmai; Vietnam – Bùi Xuân Đạt	

=== Supra Chat ===
==== Round 1 ====
Supra Chat with MISTERS 2022 Episode 1 premiered on Mister Supranational official YouTube channel on Jun 22, 2022.

- Advanced to next round

Group	Country 1	Country 2	Country 3	Country 4	Country 5	Country 6
1	Belgium	Czech Republic	France	Germany	Italy	Netherlands
2	Argentina	Brazil	Dominican Republic	Ecuador	Panama	Spain
3	Greece	Malta	~~Slovakia~~	Mauritius	Namibia	Trinidad and Tobago
4	Cambodia	Indonesia	South Korea	Laos	Thailand	Vietnam
5	Haiti	Nepal	Philippines	~~Sierra Leone~~	Poland	~~Zimbabwe~~
6	Cuba	El Salvador	Mexico	Peru	Puerto Rico	United States

- Note: Venezuela wasn't assigned to any group for the Supra Chat.

==== Final result ====
The Final premiered via Mister Supranational YouTube channel on July 14, 2022. The winner of Supra Chat will automatically advance to the Top 20 semifinalists of Mister Supranational 2022.

Results	Country	Ref.
Winner	South Korea – Han Jung-wan	
Top 12	Argentina – Angel Olaya; Belgium – Yentl van Hoorbeke; Cuba – Luis Daniel Gálvez; Ecuador – Alberto Arroyo; Italy – Giuseppe Santagata; Malta – Ron Bonsfield; Namibia – Jean-Louis Knouwds; Nepal – Sanish Shrestha; Peru – Nicola Roberto; Thailand – Teenarupakorn Muangmai; ~~Zimbabwe – Tatenda Njanike~~	

- Note: Zimbabwe officially withdrew from competition.

=== Top Model ===
The Top Model event was held on July 8, 2022. The delayed competition broadcast was officially premiered via the Mister Supranational YouTube channel on July 9, 2022. The winner of Top Model will automatically advance to the Top 20 semifinalists of Mister Supranational 2022.

Result	Country	Ref.
Winner	Mexico – Moisés Peñaloza	
Top 5	Cuba – Luis Daniel Gálvez; South Korea – Han Jung-wan; Spain – Manuel Ndele; Vietnam – Bùi Xuân Đạt	
Top 10	Argentina – Angel Olaya; France – Pierre Bondon; Peru – Nicola Roberto; Philippines – RaÉd Fernandez Al-Zghayér; Puerto Rico – Heriberto Rivera	

=== Non-Fast Track Events ===
==== Talent ====
Talent finalists were announced via Mister Supranational official Instagram account and was held on July 11, 2022. The delayed broadcast of the competition were official premiered via Mister Supranational YouTube channel on July 15, 2022.

Final results	Country	Ref.
Winner	Nepal – Sanish Shrestha	
Top 5	El Salvador – Adrián Itzam Monge; Haiti – Mendossa Désir; Indonesia – Matthew Gilbert Wibowo; Thailand – Teenarupakorn Muangmai	

== Contestants ==
Contestants were officially confirmed to compete for Mister Supranational 2022 during The Sashing Ceremony which was broadcast live from Nowy Sącz, Malopolska via Mister Supranational official YouTube on July 6, 2022.

Country/Territory	Delegate	Age (Note: Ages at the time of the pageant)	Hometown	Continental Group
Argentina	Angel Olaya (Note: Winner of Supra Star Search 2022)	26	Buenos Aires	Americas
Belgium	Yentl van Hoorbeke	26	Eeklo	Europe
Brazil	Guilherme Werner	27	Mafra	Americas
Cambodia	Panha Lao	24	Siem Reap	Asia
Cuba	Luis Daniel Gálvez	27	Havana	Caribbean
Czech Republic	Jiří Perout	23	Rájec-Jestřebí	Europe
Dominican Republic	Lewis Echavarria	27	Santo Domingo	Caribbean
Ecuador	Alberto Arroyo	28	Quito	Americas
El Salvador	Adrián Itzam Monge	26	San Salvador	Americas
France	Pierre Bondon	30	Bordeaux	Europe
Germany	Marco Bauer	33	Bensheim	Europe
Greece	Leonidas Amfilochios	23	Athens	Europe
Haiti	Mendossa Désir	26	Port-Au-Prince	Caribbean
Indonesia	Matthew Gilbert Wibowo	22	Purwokerto	Asia
Italy	Giuseppe Santagata	27	Alife	Europe
Laos	Tar Singsavanh	23	Vientiane	Asia
Malta	Ron Bonsfiled	22	Mġarr	Europe
Mauritius	Jean-Laurent David	31	Beau Bassin-Rose Hill	Africa
Mexico	Moisés Peñaloza	30	Tamaulipas	Americas
Namibia	Jean-Louis Knouwds	30	Windhoek	Africa
Nepal	Sanish Shrestha	22	Kathmandu	Asia
Netherlands	Fransel Meyers	26	Rotterdam	Europe
Panama	Elvis Alexis Hidalgo	22	Santiago de Veraguas	Americas
Peru	Nicola Roberto	21	Miraflores	Americas
Philippines	RaÉd Fernandez Al-Zghayér	22	Cebu City	Asia
Poland	Jakub Kowalewski	27	Szczecinek	Europe
Puerto Rico	Heriberto Rivera	23	Mayaguez	Caribbean
South Korea	Han Jung-wan	25	Namyangju	Asia
Spain	Manuel Ndele	26	Guadalajara	Europe
Thailand	Teenarupakorn Muangmai	27	Kamphaeng Phet	Asia
Trinidad and Tobago	Wynter Mason	25	Diego Martin	Caribbean
United States	Keith Williams	31	New Jersey	Americas
Venezuela	Anthony Gallardo	29	Caracas	Americas
Vietnam	Bùi Xuân Đạt	26	Hưng Yên	Asia

== Notes ==
=== Debuts ===
- Cambodia
- Cuba
- El Salvador
- Italy
- Mauritius
- Namibia

=== Returns ===
Last competed in 2017:

- Germany

Last competed in 2018:

- Argentina
- Trinidad and Tobago

Last competed in 2019:

- Laos
- Vietnam

=== Withdrawals ===
- Aruba
- Colombia
- India
- Morocco
- North Macedonia
- Romania
- Sierra Leone - Alhassan Dumbuya took part in Episode 5 of Supra Chat with Misters 2022 with no show in Poland.
- Singapore
- Slovakia - Michal Hlinka took part in Episode 3 of Supra Chat with Misters 2022 with no show in Poland.
- South Africa
- Togo
- Zimbabwe - Tatenda Njanike was named one of the winners in Episode 5 of Supra Chat with Misters 2022 with no show in Poland.
