= Muž roku =

National male beauty pageant competition in the Czech Republic

- Formation: 1997
- Type: Male Pageant
- Headquarters: Náchod
- Location: Czech Republic
- Members: Mister International (2010–); Man of the Year (2016–); Man of the World (2018–); Mister Tourism World (2021–); Mister Friendship International (2022–); Man of the GLOBE International (2023–); Mister Europea (2024)
- Official language: Czech
- Director: David Novotný
- Website: http://www.muzroku.cz/

Muž roku ("Man of the Year") is an annual national male beauty pageant that selects Czech Republic's representatives to participate globally. The winner of Muž roku competes in Mister International and the runners-up compete in Men Universe Model, Manhunt International, Mister Global, Man of the World and Mister United Continents pageants.

== Titleholders ==
Mister International
Mister Supranational
Mister Global
Man of the World
Man of the Year

Mister Grand International
Mister Tourism World
Men Universe Model
Manhunt International
Men Super Model

Mister United Continents
Mister Friendship International
Man of the GLOBE International
Mister Universe World

| Year | Muž roku | Town |
|---|---|---|
| 2000 | Jiří Vácha | Hradec Králové |
| 2001 | Martin Černý | Rokycany |
| 2002 | Jaroslav Filip | Prague |
| 2003 | Milan Souček | Prague |
| 2004 | Tomáš Rouha | Dvůr Králové nad Labem |
| 2005 | Eduard Kautský | Litoměřice |
| 2006 | David Bílek | Orlová |
| 2007 | Albert Smola | Psáry |
| 2008 | Miroslav Jech | České Budějovice |
| 2009 | Martin Zach | Vrchlabí |
| 2010 | Jan Hájek | Břeclav |
| 2011 | Martin Gardavský | Mořina |
| 2012 | Robert Anderle | Litovel |
| 2013 | Antonín Beránek | Brno |
| 2014 | Tomáš Dumbrovský | Brno |
| 2015 | Jakub Kraus | Liberec |
| 2016 | Josef Kůrka | Slaný |
| 2017 | Matyáš Hložek | Prague |
| 2018 | Jiří Kmoníček | Šestajovice |
| 2019 | Vojtěch Urban | Vsetín |
| 2020 | David Kremeň | Miroslav |
| 2021 | Lukáš Vyšehrad | Hradec Králové |
| 2022 | Matěj Švec | Velešín |
| 2023 | František Knobloch | Hostivice |
| 2024 | Jakub Mádl | Nový Bydžov |
| 2025 | Jiří Veselý | Mladá Boleslav |
| 2026 | Jakub Bolek | Náchod |

=== First runner-up ===
| Year | Muž roku | Town |
|---|---|---|
| 2000 | | |
| 2001 | Milan Pečko | |
| 2002 | Petr Zemánek | |
| 2003 | Karel Hájek | Prague |
| 2004 | Jan Smetana | Prague |
| 2005 | Michal Novák | Louny |
| 2006 | Jan Semlbauer | Beroun |
| 2007 | Michal Obrusník | Orlová |
| 2008 | not declared | not declared |
| 2009 | Jakub Kauer | Ústí nad Labem |
| 2010 | Jan Pochobradský | Prague |
| 2011 | Theodor Jareš | Prague |
| 2012 | Adam Klavík | Záhoří |
| 2013 | Adam Nitschmann | Ostrava |
| 2014 | Jan Pippinger | Teplice |
| 2015 | Tomáš Martinka (winner of Mister Global 2016) | Most |
| 2016 | Tomáš Dvořák | Litomyšl |
| 2017 | Roman Hein | Prague |
| 2018 | Jakub Kochta | Olomouc |
| 2019 | Jan Solfronk | Jablonec nad Nisou |
| 2020 | David Strnad | Nupaky |
| 2021 | Jiří Perout | Rájec-Jestřebí |
| 2022 | Filip Šanda | Prachatice |
| 2023 | Alexandros Panayi | Prague |
| 2024 | Petr Hantych | Ústí nad Labem |
| 2025 | Jakub Batfalský | Ostrava |
| 2026 | Oliver Laryea | Dolní Břežany |

=== Second runner-up ===
| Year | Muž roku | Town |
|---|---|---|
| 2000 | Tomáš Pokorný | Pardubice |
| 2001 | David Najman | |
| 2002 | | |
| 2003 | Radek Trojan | Lovosice |
| 2004 | | |
| 2005 | Matouš Bitto | Lelekovice |
| 2006 | Karel Frýd | Prague |
| 2007 | Michal Michajlec | Mladá Boleslav |
| 2008 | not declared | not declared |
| 2009 | not declared | not declared |
| 2010 | not declared | not declared |
| 2011 | not declared | not declared |
| 2012 | Miroslav Kolenyak | Dolní Jelení |
| 2013 | Tomáš Barthell | Cheb |
| 2014 | Jakub Šmiřák | Vsetín |
| 2015 | Jan Vurm | Poděbrady |
| 2016 | Miroslav Dubovický | Litoměřice |
| 2017 | Mikuláš Focko | Prague |
| 2018 | Jakub Jurčák | Litoměřice |
| 2019 | Immanuel Adenubi | Prague |
| 2020 | Kryštof Novák | Rumburk |
| 2021 | Dominik Chabr (winner of Man of the Year 2022) | Most |
| 2022 | Leon Vonaký | Chomutov |
| 2023 | Rostislav Procházka | Znojmo |
| 2024 | David Vencl | Náchod |
| 2025 | Tomáš Ondráček | Bludov |
| 2026 | David Ryba | Hradec Králové |

=== Third runner-up ===
| Year | Muž roku | Town |
|---|---|---|
| 2000 | not declared | not declared |
| 2001 | not declared | not declared |
| 2002 | not declared | not declared |
| 2003 | not declared | not declared |
| 2004 | not declared | not declared |
| 2005 | not declared | not declared |
| 2006 | not declared | not declared |
| 2007 | not declared | not declared |
| 2008 | not declared | not declared |
| 2009 | not declared | not declared |
| 2010 | not declared | not declared |
| 2011 | not declared | not declared |
| 2012 | not declared | not declared |
| 2013 | Jakub Kaplan | Vysoké Mýto |
| 2014 | Matěj Quitt | Brušperk |
| 2015 | David Šváb | Čáslav |
| 2016 | Lukáš Lesák | Plzeň |
| 2017 | Michal Žůrek | Brno |

=== Director's choice(s) ===
| Year | Muž roku | Town |
|---|---|---|
| 2014 | Lukáš Dostál | Brno |
| 2015 | not declared | not declared |
| 2016 | Jan Pultar | Holohlavy |
| 2016 | Jan Caha | Kouty |
| 2017 | Jakub Klíma | Chomutov |
| 2017 | Petr Koukal | Roudnice nad Labem |
| 2018 | Daniel Koždoň | Ostrava |
| 2018 | Cao Thanh Tung | Pustějov |
| 2019 | Lukáš Moučka | Krupka |
| 2019 | Jiří Hemelka | Prostějov |
| 2020 | Lukáš Veitl | Sokolov |
| 2021 | Viktor Agateljan | Ústí nad Labem |
| 2021 | Petr Kinský | Javorník |
| 2022 | David Pleva | Teplice |
| 2022 | Petr Ngo | Teplice |
| 2022 | Jan Balšán | Prague |
| 2022 | Philipp Stoimenov | Ostrava |
| 2022 | Denys Poljanskyj | Hořovice |
| 2023 | Jan Koželuh | Klatovy |
| 2023 | Lukáš Kupkovič | Cheb |
| 2023 | Jan Černhorský | Nové Strašecí |
| 2023 | Stefanos Panayi | Prague |
| 2023 | Matteo Lucano | Kralupy nad Vltavou |
| 2024 | Ondřej Valenta | Prague |
| 2024 | Daniel Sklář | Frýdek-Místek |
| 2024 | Daniel Štefan | Strančice |
| 2024 | Jan Jiránek | Mladá Boleslav |
| 2025 | Vojtěch Horálek | Sudovo Hlavno |
| 2025 | Rostislav Baďura | Frýdek-Místek |
| 2025 | Martin Černý | Svatý Mikuláš |

== International pageants ==
Color key

- Declared as Winner
- Ended as runner-up
- Ended as one of the finalists or semi-finalists

=== Mister International ===
| Year | Election | Muž roku | Placement | Special Awards |
|---|---|---|---|---|
| 2010 | 1st Runner-up | Jan Pochobradský | Unplaced | |
| 2011 | Muž roku | Martin Gardavský | 1st Runner-up | |
| 2012 | Muž roku | Robert Anderle | Unplaced | |
| 2013 | Muž roku | Antonín Beránek | 5th Runner-up | |
| 2014 | Muž roku | Tomáš Dumbrovský | 2nd Runner-up | |
| 2015 | Muž roku | Jakub Kraus | 4th Runner-up | |
| 2016 | Muž roku | Josef Kůrka | Top 16 | |
| 2017 | Muž roku | Matyáš Hložek | Unplaced | |
| 2018 | Muž roku | Jiří Kmoníček | 3rd Runner-up | |
| 2022 | Muž roku | Matěj Švec | Top 16 | |
| 2023 | 1st Runner-up | Alexandros Panayi | Top 20 | |
| 2024 | 6th Runner-up | Ondřej Valenta | Unplaced | |
| 2025 | Muž roku | Jiří Veselý | Unplaced | |
| 2026 | 1st Runner-up | Oliver Laryea | TBD | |

=== Mister Supranational ===
| Year | Election | Muž roku | Placement | Special Awards |
|---|---|---|---|---|
| 2016 | 5th Runner-up | Jan Pultar | Top 20 (11th place) | |
| 2017 | Finalist | David Jaček | Unplaced | |
| 2018 | 1st Runner-up | Jakub Kochta | Top 20 (13th place) | |
| 2019 | 1st Runner-up | Jan Solfronk | Top 10 (6th place) | Mister Supranational Europe; Mister Fitness |
| 2021 | Muž roku | David Kremeň | Top 20 (11th place) | |
| 2022 | 1st Runner-up | Jiří Perout | Unplaced | |
| 2023 | Mister Czech Republic | Jakub Vitek | Top 10 (7th place) | Mister Supranational Europe |
| 2024 | Mister Czech Republic | Adam Sedro | Top 20 (13th place) | |
| 2025 | Mister Czech Republic | Tomáš Haring | Top 10 | Mister Supranational Europe |
| 2026 | Mister Czech Republic | Daniel Zedníček | Top 20 | Mister Supranational Europe |

=== Mister Global ===
| Year | Election | Muž roku | Placement | Special Awards |
|---|---|---|---|---|
| 2015 | 2nd Runner-up | Jakub Šmiřák | Top 8 | Mister Photogenic |
| 2016 | 1st Runner-up | Tomáš Martinka | WINNER | |
| 2017 | 1st Runner-up | Tomáš Dvořák | Unplaced | |
| 2018 | 3rd Runner-up | Michal Žůrek | Unplaced | |
| 2019 | 3rd Runner-up | Cao Thanh Tung | Unplaced | |
| 2021 | 3rd Runner-up | Jiří Hemelka | Unplaced | |
| 2022 | 2nd Runner-up | Leon Vonaký | Unplaced | |
| 2023 | Muž roku | František Knobloch | Unplaced | |

=== Man of the World ===
| Year | Election | Muž roku | Placement | Special Awards |
|---|---|---|---|---|
| 2018 | Semifinalist | Ondřej Valenta | 3rd Runner-up | (gold) Best in Resort Wear |
| 2019 | 2nd Runner-up | Jakub Jurčák | 2nd Runner-up | (gold) Best in Beach Wear; (silver) Best in Swimwear |
| 2022 | 3rd Runner-up | Petr Kinský | Top 10 | (silver) Mister Personality |
| 2023 | 5th Runner-up | Jan Balšán | Top 10 | (gold) Best in Swimwear; (silver) Best in Formal Wear |
| 2024 | 2nd Runner-up | Rostislav Procházka | Unplaced | (gold) Mister Congeniality; (bronze) Best in Arrival Wear |
| 2025 | 3rd Runner-up | Jan Jiránek | 3rd Runner-up | (bronze) Fashion of the World |
| 2026 | 2nd Runner-up | Tomáš Ondráček | Top 18 | |
| 2027 | Top 5 | Jan Sumarta | TBD | |

=== Man of the Year ===
| Year | Election | Muž roku | Placement | Special Awards |
|---|---|---|---|---|
| 2016 | 2nd Runner-up | Jan Vurm | Unplaced | Man of the Year Mindful |
| 2017 | 3rd Runner-up | Lukáš Lesák | 2nd Runner-up | Man of the Year Europe |
| 2018 | 5th Runner-up | Jakub Klíma | 4th Runner-up | Man of the Year Europe; Best Prince |
| 2022 | 2nd Runner-up | Dominik Chabr | WINNER | Man of the Year Masculine; Man of the Year Europe |
| 2023 | 1st Runner-up | Filip Šanda | 2nd Runner-up | |
| 2024 | 4th Runner-up | Stefanos Panayi | Top 13 | |
| 2025 | Muž roku | Jakub Mádl | Top 8 | |
| 2026 | Top 5 | Tomáš Valinský | TBD | |

=== Mister Grand International ===
| Year | Election | Muž roku | Placement | Special Awards |
|---|---|---|---|---|
| 2021 | Muž roku | Lukáš Vyšehrad | Top 18 | |
| 2022 | 3rd Runner-up | Denys Poljanskyj | Top 18 | |
| 2023 | 3rd Runner-up | Matteo Lucano | Top 16 | |

=== Mister Friendship International ===
| Year | Election | Muž roku | Placement | Special Awards |
|---|---|---|---|---|
| 2022 | 1st Runner-up | David Strnad | Top 10 (7th place) | Best in Talent; Mister Khon Kaen |
| 2023 | 5th Runner-up | Jan Černohorský | 4th Runner-up | |
| 2024 | 1st Runner-up | Petr Hantych | | Mister Friendship Europe |
| 2025 | Muz Roku | Jakub Mádl | 3rd Runner-up | Mister Friendship Hot Icon |
| 2026 | Muz Roku | Jakub Bolek | TBD | |

=== Mister Tourism World ===
| Year | Election | Muž roku | Placement | Special Awards |
|---|---|---|---|---|
| 2021 | 3rd Runner-up | Petr Kinský | Top 10 | |
| 2022 | 4th Runner-up | Philipp Stoimenov | Unplaced | |
| 2023 | Top 8 | Lukáš Kupkovič | Unplaced | |
| 2024 | Top 8 | Daniel Štefan | Top 10 | Maschile Model Look |

=== Man of the GLOBE International ===
| Year | Election | Muž roku | Placement | Special Awards |
|---|---|---|---|---|
| 2023 | 2nd Runner-up | Jan Koželuh | 2nd Runner-up | Best in Swimwear |
| 2026 | Top 6 | Martin Černý | 1st Runner-up | |
| 2027 | 2nd Runner-Up | David Ryba | TBD | |

=== Men Universe Model ===
| Year | Election | Muž roku | Placement | Special Awards |
|---|---|---|---|---|
| 2013 | 2nd Runner-up | Miroslav Kolenyak | Top 12 | Best Body |
| 2014 | 1st Runner-up | Adam Nitschmann | Unplaced | Mister Elegance |
| 2015 | Finalist | Lukáš Dostál | Unplaced | |
| 2016 | 3rd Runner-up | David Šváb | Unplaced | |
| 2017 | 2nd Runner-up | Miroslav Dubovický | Top 15 | |
| 2018 | 4th Runner-up | Petr Koukal | Top 12 | |
| 2019 | 4th Runner-up | Daniel Koždoň | Top 15 | |

=== Men Super Model World ===
| Year | Election | Muž roku | Placement | Special Awards |
|---|---|---|---|---|
| 2021 | 3rd Runner-up | Lukáš Veitl | Unplaced | |
| 2021 | 4th Runner-up | Viktor Agateljan | Unplaced | |
| 2022 | Top 8 | David Pleva | 2nd Runner-up | Best Body |
| 2022 | Top 8 | Petr Ngo | Unplaced | |

=== Manhunt International ===
| Year | Election | Muž roku | Placement | Special Awards |
|---|---|---|---|---|
| 1994 | Appointed | Karel Kovarik | Unplaced | |
| 1999 | Appointed | Ondra Klement | Unplaced | |
| 2010 | Muž roku | Jan Hájek | Unplaced | |
| 2011 | 1st Runner-up | Theodor Jareš | Unplaced | |
| 2012 | 1st Runner-up | Adam Klavík | Unplaced | |
| 2016 | 4th Runner-up | Jan Caha | Unplaced | Best Masculine Charm |
| 2020 | Mr. Look Bella World | Jan Potočný | Unplaced | |

=== Mister United Continents ===
| Year | Election | Muž roku | Placement | Special Awards |
|---|---|---|---|---|
| 2016 | 2nd Runner-up | Jan Vurm | Top 13 | Best in Sports challenge |

== See also ==
- Czech Miss
