= Mister International Korea =

National male beauty pageant competition in South Korea

Mister International Korea 미스터 인터내셔널 코리아
- Formation: 2013; 13 years ago
- Type: Beauty pageant
- Headquarters: Seoul
- Location: South Korea
- Members: Mister International; Mister Global; Mister Supranational; Man of the World; Mister Cosmo; Man of The Year; Mister Friendship International; Mister Cosmopolitan; Mister Celebrity International; Mister Fitness Supermodel World; Mister Eco International
- Official language: Korean
- President: Ricky Junghoon Jun
- Parent organization: W.B.Q
- Website: website

Mister International Korea (Korean: 미스터 인터내셔널 코리아) is an annual national male beauty pageant responsible for selecting South Korea's representatives to the Mister International, Mister Global, Mister Supranational, Man of the World, Mister Cosmo, Man of The Year, Mister Friendship International, Mister Cosmopolitan, Mister Celebrity International, Mister Fitness Supermodel World, Mister Eco International and other beauty pageants.

== History ==
Exploring the world of South Korean male beauty contests, men's pageants are increasingly gaining popularity in South Korea. Previously, the Korean representatives were selected through an online announcement or an unofficial public contest, but in 2013, the tournament was officially held and Kim Jae Hyuk took the first win. The first competition was held in 2013.

== International Crowns ==
Number of wins under Mister International Korea
Franchises
Pageant	Title	Winning year(s)
Mister International	1	2017
Mister Global	1	2019
Man of the World	2	2019 • 2023
Man of The Year	1	2019
Mister Friendship International	1	2022
Mister Tourism & Culture Universe	1	2018

The following are the Mister International Korea titleholders throughout the years.

- One — Mister International winner:
  - Lee Seung-hwan (2017)
- One — Mister Global winner:
  - Kim Jong-woo (2019)
- Two — Man of the World winners:
  - Kim Jin-kyu (2019) • Kim Jin-wook (2023)
- One — Man of The Year winner:
  - Lee Ho-jin (2019)
- One — Mister Friendship International winner:
  - Yoo Byeong-eun (2022)
- One — Mister Tourism & Culture Universe winner:
  - Yoo Su-jae (2018)

== Placements at international pageants ==
- 11 placements at Mister International. The highest placement is Lee Seung-hwan as Mister International 2017.
- 11 placements at Mister Global. The highest placement is Kim Jong-woo as Mister Global 2019.
- 2 placements at Mister Supranational. The highest placement is Lee Yong-woo as 3rd Runner-up of Mister Supranational 2023.
- 5 placements at Man of the World. The highest placement is Kim Jin-kyu as Man of the World 2019, Kim Jin-wook as Man of the World 2023.
- 1 placements at Mister Grand International. The highest placement is Hwang Jun-sung as 4th Runner-up of Mister Grand International 2023.
- 5 placements at Man of The Year. The highest placement is Lee Ho-jin as Man of The Year 2019.
- 3 placements at Mister Friendship International. The highest placement is Yoo Byeong-eun as Mister Friendship International 2022.
- 2 placements at Mister Tourism & Culture Universe. The highest placement is Yoo Su-jae as Mister Tourism & Culture Universe 2018.

== Titles ==
Number of wins from Mister International Korea (licenses)
Pageant	Wins
Mister International	1
Mister Global	1
Mister Supranational	0
Man of the World	2
Mister Cosmo	0
Man of The Year	1
Mister Friendship International	1
Mister Cosmopolitan	0
Mister Celebrity International	0
Mister Fitness Supermodel World	0
Mister Eco International	0
Mister Grand International	0
Mister Universe Tourism	0
Mister Model International	0
Mister Tourism & Culture Universe	1
Man Hot Star International	0
Mister Model Worldwide	0
Mister Universe Model	0
Mister Tourism World	0
Mister National Universe	0
Mister Landscapes International	0
The Best Male Model of the Universe	0
Mister Asia	0

Note that the year designates the time Mister International Korea has acquired that particular pageant franchise.

- Mister International (2007–present)
- Mister Global (2014–present)
- Mister Supranational (2017–present)
- Man of the World (2017–present)
- Mister Cosmo (2027–present)
- Man of The Year (2018–present)
- Mister Friendship International (2021–present)
- Mister Cosmopolitan (2023–present)
- Mister Celebrity International (2024–present)
- Mister Fitness Supermodel World (2023–present)
- Mister Eco International (2026–present)
- Mister Grand International (2023)
- Mister Universe Tourism (2025)
- Mister Model International (2016)
- Mister Tourism & Culture Universe (2018–2019)
- Man Hot Star International (2022–2024)
- Mister Model Worldwide (2018–2019)
- Mister Universe Model (2011)
- Mister Tourism World (2018)
- Mister National Universe (2022)
- Mister Landscapes International (2019)
- The Best Male Model of the Universe (2022)
- Mister Asia (2014)

== Titleholders ==
Year	Mister International Korea	Runners Up				Final Entrants	Ref.
Year	Mister International Korea	First	Second	Third^{[α]}	Fourth	Final Entrants	Ref.
2013	Kim Jae-hyuk	Lee Jun-ho	Kim Tae-gyun	Park Young-ho	Chae Se-young	22	
2014	Jeong Jin-soo	Kim Ji-sung	Jeon Jung-geun	Kim Kwang-ho	Jang Kang-il	26	
2015	Lee Sang-jin	Jung Joo-yeong	Jang Ki-woong	Lee Seong-min	Shin Je-hwan, Kim Seon-woo	24	
2016	Jung Goo-yeong	Kim Jung-hoo	Choi Byung-jun	Kim Hyun-woo	Yoo Su-jae	25	
2017	Lee Seung-hwan	Kang Doo-hyung	Kim Young-geun	Ahn Seong-hwan	Jung Hyo-bin	25	
2018	Hwang Dae-woong	Kim Jong-woo, Park Cheong-woo	Cheon Dong-hun, Kim Jin-kyu, Kim Gyung-ho	Not awarded	Not awarded	27	
2019	Cho Jae-young	Yoon Chi-ho, Moon Jae-hoon	Moon Tae-joon, Cho In-hwan	Lee Jung-woo	Not awarded	40	
2020	Lee Gil-won	Lee Kyu-rim, Park Kang-hyun	Moon Seong-hun, Moon Byun-cheol, Cho Young-dong	Choi Seung-hyuk	Not awarded	33	
2021	Han Jung-wan	Cho Yong-tae, Lee Dong-hun	Jeong Da-hoon, Lee Jae-ho, Shin Dong-woo	Lee Jae-hong, Yea Seong-beom	Not awarded	34	
2022	Kim Hee-won	Lee Yong-woo, Kim You-soo	Hong Seok-jin, Yoo Byeong-eun, Kim Jin-wook	Lee Won-young, Kim Sang-hun	Not awarded	34	
2023	Kang Ho-sun	Jang Tae-hyeon, Lim Jeong-yun	Jung Hae-won, Ko Jun-hyeok, Hwang Jun-sung	Jo Seong-hyeon, Seok Bo-geun	Not awarded	35	
2024	Heo Joon-sung	Yun Hyun-jae, Lee Seung-chan	Park Hee-geon, Lee Hee-yoon, Shin Jae-min	Jeon Won-gi, Kwon Hyuk-joong	Not awarded	35	
2025	Choi Seung-ho	Eric Kang, Kim Tae-woo	Choi Ju-sung, Oh Ji-seok, Kim Jun-hyeok	Kim Jin-hyeong, Lee Yong-Seok	Not awarded	29	
2026	Park Jung-gyu	Lee Jeong-chan, Jung Myeong-cheol	Lee Jong-hyun, Shin Sang-min, Kim Woo-hyeuk	Kim Seung-han, Jun Yi-soo	Not awarded	31	

Note:
- ^α Third Runners Up: Wild Card from 2019

== National finalists ==
The following list is the national finalists of the Mister International Korea pageant, as well as the competition results.

Color keys
W Declared as the winner
Ended as a runner-up
Ended as a semi-finalist
Ended as a Quarterfinalist
Ended as special awards winner
– Did not participate
Withdraw during the competition

Year No.	2013	2014	2015	2016	2017	2018	2019	2020	2021	2022	2023	2024	2025	2026
01	Cha Young Chan	Kang Young Gyu	Shin Je Hwan	Choi Seon U	Lee Won Joon	Hwang Dae Woong	Park Kyu Heon	Moon Byung Cheol	Yoo Hyo Bum	Ryu Seol Mo	Kim Seong Hun	Kwon Hyuk Joong	Oh Ji Seok	Lee Jeong Chan
02	Kim Kyoung Ro	Jeon Jeong Geun	Lee Seong Min	Kang Jun Seok	Kim Han Woong	Na Gi Wook	Hwang Sung Hyun	Park Seon Jun	Lee Joo Yong	Kim Tae Hun	Kim Dae Hyun	Lee Hee Yoon	Lim Yo Han	Lee Seung Jae
03	Kim Yong Sik	Park Soon Seong	Jang Woo Hyeok	Choi Si Hyoung	Kim Young Geun	Cheon Dong Hun	Cho Jae Young	Choi Won Hui	Lee Jae Ho	Kim Young Jun	Seok Bo Geun	Jeon Won Gi	Choi Ju Sung	Ko Hee Seung
04	Kim Tae Gyun	Kim Bong Suk	Lee Jun Beom	Nam Eon Ha	Yoo Chang Hyun	Hwang Tae Ho	Yoon Chi Ho	Kim Yun Jae	Cho Yong Tae	Yoo Dong Jae	Won Chan Hyeok	Kang Min Chan	Jung Min Jong	Kim Woo Hyeok
05	Kim Ji Heon	Kim Dae Han	Im Che Ung	Kim Hyun Woo	Cho Ho Yeon	Baek Jun Hyeon	Cho In Hwan	Kwon Min Chan	Kim Dae Ho	Jo Woo Jae	Kang Ho Sun	Ji Seung Hyun	Moon Joo Won	Shin Sang Min
06	Lee Jun Ho	Sin Chul Min	Han Ji Won	Kim Seung Min	Kang Doo Hyung	Bae Yong Wook	Chae Jung Min	Kim Jae Sang	Kim Chang Hoi	Kim Do Yoon	Lee Joo Won	Kim Han Young	Kim Jin Hyeong	Jun Yi Soo
07	We Ji Woong	Jang Joseph	Kim Dong Young	Jeong Dae Jin	Jang Yoon Seong	Jeon Tae Kook	Lee Hyeong Seok	Kim Sung Jun	Kwon Yong Il	Lim Su Bin	Jeon Hyeong Sik	Park Hee Gun	kang Hyun Joon	Hwang Sung Hyeon
08	Park Young Ho	Jang Kang Il	Kim Su Bin	Woo Se Hyun	Son Young Min	Lee Kyeong Hoon	Kim Hyeon Joong	Lee Keon Seok	Kim Min Sung	Jeong Ho Gyun	Kim Sung Jun	Jo Jun	Jung Ji Seok	Kim Hyun Sung
09	Park Doo Won	Kim Hyun Woo	Park Seong Jun	Choi Byeong Jun	Min Yong Gyu	Cha Seung Jun	Jang Tae Poong	Moon Seong Hun	Kim Dong Hun	Song Guen Young	Jung Hae Won	Kim Dong Bin	Kim Jun Hyeok	Jung Sung Jun
10	Park Hyoung Seong	Jung Jin Soo	Jung Joo Young	Bae Jun Yeol	Woo Seung Seok	Kim Jin Kyu	Song Sang Hoon	Han Bo Seok	Wi Jae Ho	Han Jae Hyun	Jo Seong Hyeon	Ha Tae Won	Yoon Chan	Jeong Do Hoon
11	Choi In Ho	Jo Dong Hyun	Kim Seon Woo	Cho Young Myeong	Oh Shin Il	Kim Gyung Ho	Kim Beom Jun	Choi Min Gyu	Lee Kwang Won	Lee In Jae	Bae Jin Hyuk	Jeong Jun Won	Choi Seung Ho	Park Jung Hyun
12	Park Won Jin	Kim Un Hyung	Choi Gyu Min	Cho Han Him	Kim Man Jin	Kim Jong Woo	Han Jae Hyeon	Kim Sung Hun	Kim Jong Yeop	Kim You Soo	Park Ju Hyun	Park Jun Hyoung	Park Su Bin	Kim Min Geon
13	Kim Jae Hyuk	Seo Joo Hyuk	Jang Gi Woong	Kim Jeong Hoo	Lee Won Jun	Lim Jin Wook	Yu Seung Mok	Oh Han Su	Kim Min Jong	Lee Yong Woo	Choi Woo Seok	Joo Seong Hun	Na Hyun Seok	Yu Hee Seong
14	Jo Seong Hwan	Lee Sang Hak	Lee Sang Jin	Lee Jun Seok	Ann Seong Hwan	Kang Han Byeol	Moon Tae Joon	Kang Ju Hyung	Lee Dong Hun	Jung In Jae	Lim Jeong Yun	Kim Seon Woo	Lee Hyun Boo	Kim Jae Yoon
15	Won Chang Yeon	Choi In Ho	Kim Dong Gyu	Oh Yong Se	Lee Jae Dong	Kim Hyeon Woo	Chun Jae Hyeon	Park Kang Hyun	Shin Woo Sung	Jun Byeong Chan	Shin Jae Youp	Han Ji Hoon	Jeong Seung Hwan	Lee Jong Hyun
16	Kim Soo Byoung	Kim Kwang Ho	Kim Seong Dae	Jung Dae Jin	Koo Je Hyeong	Kim Chul Gi	Kim Ye Hyun	Lee Kyu Rim	Choi Kwang Jin	Kim Hee Won	Kim Min Seok	Choi Jae Hyuk	Jo Eun Il	Shin Jeong Min
17	Lee Jae Joon	We Ji Woong	Heo Jae Young	Choi Byeong Geun	Lee Seung Hwan	Park Hee Won	Kim Kang Rae	Jang Jun Seok	Koo Kyung Min	Kang Dong Woo	Yoo Seung Wan	Cha Jae Kwon	Lim Dong Gyun	Ahn Ho Yeon
18	Jeong Si Hyun	Lee Jin Woo	Choi Youn Im	Han Young Il	Han Tae Hee	Lee Sang Mok	Kim Min Seok	Lee Jin Hwan	Yea Seong Beom	Lee Won Young	Lee Ji Hoon	Won Hyun Woo	Park Gyu Beom	Park Jin Hyun
19	Chae Se Young	Kim Tae Geun	Kim Hyeong Tae	Kim Nam Yeon	Hong Pu Reum	Park Gyeong Hun	Hwang Sang Ho	Lee Gil Won	Hong Seong Min	Park Tae In	Na Jae Ho	Lee Jun Min	Lee Yong Seok	Lee Song Hun
20	Um Jong Kwon	Lee Min Jae	Park Il Seo	Kim Soo Hyun	Kim Gil Hwan	Jeon Seung U	Cho Hyo Joon	Kim Young Su	Yu Yu Tae	Kim Tae Beom	Kim Hye Sung	Shin Jae Min	Yim Sung Min	Park Ju Won
21	Woo Young Soo	Chae Chan Kuk	Oh Jae Uk	Cheon Ji Young	Park Cheong Woo	Park In Jae	Hong Sung Taek	Park So Cheol	Jeong Da Hoon	Jeong Yoon Seong	Park In Hyeok	Baek Jae Min	Eric kang	Kim Han Kyu
22	Hwang Sang Woon	Kim Ji Sung	Park Jong Min	Oh Hyeong Kyun	Jeon Jin Mo	Lee Chang Keon	Lee Ho Jin	Ji Chung Heon	Shin Dong Woo	Kim Joo Young	Hwang Jun Sung	Lim Ik Beom	Kim Moo Jin	Jung Myeong Cheol
23	—	Moon Pil	Kim Jin Seop	Yoo Su Jae	Wang Sung Yong	Min Kyu Hong	Kwon Jae Hee	Cho Young Dong	Ji Pyung Sun	Sohn Ki Jin	Kim Min Seong	Lee Seung Chan	Lee Seung Jun	Lee Jin Soo
24	—	Lee Do Yun	Kim Tae Heon	Seo Seung Woo	Jung Hyo Bin	Kim Ju Min	Park Beom Seok	Hwang Kyu Ha	Lee Jae Hong	Park Chan Min	Park Sang Hyun	Park Seung Gyu	Lee Ho Sung	Namgung Kang
25	—	Choi Chang Won	—	Jung Goo Yeong	Hwang In Jun	Kim Hwang Joong	Seong Do Yoon	Kwon Min Chang	Gang Dae Hyun	Hong Seok Jin	Kang Sang Muk	Shin Woon Seo	Kam Ju Won	Shin Jae Yong
26	—	Dang Hyeon Seok	—	—	—	Park Cheong Woo	Kim Won Seok	Bae Jae Hyeong	Kim Min Jae	Song Bon Hyang	Yeo Chang Geon	Jeong Seung Ho	Kim Tae Woo	Park Jung Gyu
27	—	—	—	—	—	—	Oh Byeong Hwa	Jung Tae Yang	Han Jung Wan	Kang Sang Hyuk	Kang Min Ho	Kim Eon Hyeong	Park Chang Min	Yang Seon Woo
28	—	—	—	—	—	—	Shin Sang Yoon	Jung Chang Young	Ban Kyu Young	Jin Suk Hyun	Jang Tae Hyeon	Jeong Han Seong	Kim Kyung Heon	Shin Je-hoon
29	—	—	—	—	—	—	Lee Jung Woo	Choi Seung Hyuk	Lee Heong Seok	Heo Jun Ho	Kim Sang Wook	Kwon Chang In	Lee Man Yeol	Seo Yi Chang
30	—	—	—	—	—	—	Moon Jae Hoon	Hwangbo Jin Woo	Seo Hee Seung	Yoo Byeong Eun	Lee Jong Hyun	Yoon Hyeon Jae	Go Geon Ho	Kim Seung Han
31	—	—	—	—	—	—	Sim Dong Jun	Han Hee Su	Na Hyun Su	Park Seon Geun	Soh Kyu Hwang	Kim Jae Hee	Lee Chae Yeol	Kim Woong Ki
32	—	—	—	—	—	—	Kim Bong Kyung	Um Poo Reun	Lee Do Kyun	Park Sang Jun	Kim Paul Cheong	Kim Hyun Jun	—	Kim Seung Ji
33	—	—	—	—	—	—	Jang Jae Won	Lee Bo Hyung	Lee Hee Chan	Kim Sang Hun	Kwon Ki Ha	Hwangbo Hyung Gyu	—	—
34	—	—	—	—	—	—	Koo Sung Geun	—	Hong Sung Je	Kim Jin Wook	Ko Jun Hyeok	Heo Jun Seong	—	—
35	—	—	—	—	—	—	Kim Young Don	—	—	Yun Sung Min	Jeong Chan Yang	Ahn Seon Jun	—	—
36	—	—	—	—	—	—	Kim Chan Hong	—	—	Park Hyeon Seok	Lee Dong Jin	Kwon Yong Wook	—	—
37	—	—	—	—	—	—	Song Jae Yoon	—	—	Yoon Dae Hyun	—	—	—	—
38	—	—	—	—	—	—	Woo In Chang	—	—	—	—	—	—	—
39	—	—	—	—	—	—	Jeong Jun Hyuk	—	—	—	—	—	—	—
40	—	—	—	—	—	—	Cho Hyun Sang	—	—	—	—	—	—	—
Total	22	26	24	25	25	26	40	33	34	37	36	36	31	32

== Representatives to international beauty pageants ==
Color keys

- : Declared as Winner
- : Ended as runner-up
- : Ended as top 5/6 qualification
- : Ended as one of the finalists or semifinalists
- : Ended as special awards

=== Mister International Korea ===
The winner of Mister International Korea competes in the Mister International pageant. Sometimes a Runner-up or finalist is sent instead of the winner.

W.B.Q
Year	Delegate	Korean Name	Residence	National Title	Placement at MI	Special Awards
2026	Park Jung-gyu	박정규	Cheongju, Chungbuk	Mister International Korea 2026	Top 10	1 Special Awards: Top 12 - King of Andaman
2025	Choi Seung-ho	최승호	Seoul	Mister International Korea 2025	2nd Runner-up	3 Special Awards: Herb Gold - Earth Gold Bright Skin Award; Xpedition - Star of the Night Award; Top 5 - Best in Swimwear
2024	Heo Joon-sung	허준성	Seoul	Mister International Korea 2024	Top 10	
2023	Kang Ho-sun	강호선	Seoul	Mister International Korea 2023	Top 20	1 Special Awards: CHAT Cosmetics - Smart Guy Award
2022	Cho Jae-young	조재영	Seoul	Mister International Korea 2019	Unplaced	
2022	Kim Hee-won	김희원	Jinju, Gyeongnam	Mister International Korea 2022	Did not compete	
2021	Han Jung-wan	한정완	Namyangju	Mister International Korea 2021	Due to the impact of COVID-19 pandemic, no competition held between 2019 and 2021	
2020	Lee Gil-won	이길원	Seoul	Mister International Korea 2020	Due to the impact of COVID-19 pandemic, no competition held between 2019 and 2021	
2018	Hwang Dae-woong	황대웅	Bucheon	Mister International Korea 2018	Top 15	1 Special Awards: Top 10 - Best in National Costume
2017	Lee Seung-hwan	이승환	Seoul	Mister International Korea 2017	Mister International 2017	
2016	Jung Goo-yeong	정구영	Seoul	Mister International Korea 2016	Unplaced	
2015	Lee Sang-jin	이상진	Seoul	Mister International Korea 2015	2nd Runner-up	
2014	Park Young-ho	박영호	Incheon	3rd Runner-Up of 2013	Top 10	1 Special Awards: Most Stylish
2014	Jeong Jin-soo	정진수	Seoul	Mister International Korea 2014	Did not compete	
2013	Kim Jae-hyuk	김재혁	Seoul	Mister International Korea 2013	Unplaced	
2012	Kim Do-yeop	김도엽	Ulsan	Appointed	Top 10	
2011	Oh Ji-sung	오지성	Seoul	Appointed	Top 10	1 Special Awards: Most Cute Man
2010	Kim Gi-jong	김기종	Daegu	Appointed	Unplaced	
2009	Baek Joo-suk	백주석	Seoul	Appointed: Biotherm & Ceci Model 2009	Unplaced	
2008	Park Jung-wan	박정완	Seoul	Appointed: Elite Model Korea 2007	Unplaced	
2007	Oh Jong-sung	오종성	Seoul	Appointed	1st Runner-up	

=== Mister Global Korea ===
The Runner-up or finalist of Mister International Korea competes in the Mister Global pageant.

W.B.Q
Year	Delegate	Korean Name	Residence	National Title	Placement at MG	Special Awards
2026	Lee Jeong-chan	이정찬	Bucheon, Gyeonggi	1st Runner-Up of 2026	Top 20	
2025	Eric Kang	강에릭	California, USA	1st Runner-Up of 2025	Top 11	1 Special Awards: 1st r-up - Mister Popularity
2024	Yun Hyun-jae	윤현제	Seoul	1st Runner-Up of 2024	Top 11	
2023	Lim Jeong-yun	임정윤	Busan	1st Runner-Up of 2023	Top 10	2 Special Awards: Mister Congeniality; Mister Kaeng Leng Chan Mahasarakham Winner
2022	Kim Hee-won	김희원	Jinju, Gyeongnam	Mister International Korea 2022	Top 5	3 Special Awards: Looker Thailand; Best Charming Smile; 2nd r-up - Herb Gold Shining Skin
2021	Shin Dong-woo	신동우	Seoul	2nd Runner-Up of 2021	2nd Runner-up	2 Special Awards: Herb Gold Ambassador; Runners-up - Mister Na Chuek Favorite
2021	Lee Kyu-rim	이규림	Seoul	1st Runner-Up of 2020	Due to the impact of COVID-19 pandemic	
2020	Yoon Chi-ho	윤치호	Ansan	1st Runner-Up of 2019	Due to the impact of COVID-19 pandemic, no competition held	
2019	Kim Jong-woo	김종우	Jecheon, Chungbuk	1st Runner-Up of 2018	Mister Global 2019	
2018	Kang Doo-hyung	강두형	Seoul	1st Runner-Up of 2017	Top 16 (Top 10)	2 Special Awards: Best Physique; Top 5 - Best in Talent
2017	Yoo Su-jae	유수재	Gwangju, Gyeonggi	4th Runner-Up of 2016	Top 16	1 Special Awards: Mister Congeniality
2016	Kim Gi-jong	김기종	Daegu	Appointed	Top 10	
2016	Jung Joo-yeong	정주영	Seoul	1st Runner-Up of 2015	Did not compete	
2015	Yoon Tae-ho	윤태호	Seoul	Appointed	Unplaced	1 Special Awards: Best Model
2015	Kim Ji-sung	김지성	Seoul	1st Runner-Up of 2014	Did not compete	
2014	Lee Jun-ho	이준호	Incheon	1st Runner-Up of 2013	2nd Runner-up	2 Special Awards: Mister Physique; Top 5 - Best in Talent

=== Mister Supranational Korea ===
The Runner-up or finalist of Mister International Korea competes in the Mister Supranational pageant.

W.B.Q
Year	Delegate	Korean Name	Residence	National Title	Placement at MS	Special Awards
2027	Jung Myeong-cheol	정명철	Seoul	1st Runner-Up of 2026	TBA	TBA
2026	Kim Tae-woo	김태우	Seoul	1st Runner-Up of 2025	Unplaced	1 Special Awards: Top 10 - Supra Chat
2025	Lee Seung-chan	이승찬	Seoul	1st Runner-Up of 2024	Unplaced	1 Special Awards: Mister Talent Winner
2024	Jo Seong-hyeon	조성현	Seoul	3rd Runner-Up of 2023	Unplaced	2 Special Awards: Top 10 - Supra Fan-Vote; Top 11 - Supra Model of the Year
2024	Jang Tae-hyeon	장태현	Gangneung	1st Runner-Up of 2023	Did not compete	
2023	Lee Yong-woo	이용우	Seoul	1st Runner-Up of 2022	3rd Runner-Up	1 Special Awards: Top Model Winner
2022	Han Jung-wan	한정완	Namyangju	Mister International Korea 2021	Top 20 (11th Place)	4 Special Awards: Supra Chat Winner; Top 5 - Top Model; Top 10 - Mister Talent; Top 12 - Mister Influencer
2021	Cho Young-dong	조영동	Seoul	2nd Runner-Up of 2020	Unplaced	2 Special Awards: Mister Friendship; Top 10 - Mister Influencer
2020	Park Kang-hyun	박강현	Seongnam	1st Runner-Up of 2020	Due to the impact of COVID-19 pandemic, no competition held	
2019	Woo Chang-wook	우창욱	Pohang	Appointed (Audition)	Unplaced	
2019	Moon Jae-hoon	문재훈	Daejeon	1st Runner-Up of 2019	Did not compete (Health reasons)	
2018	Park Cheong-woo	박청우	Mokpo	1st Runner-Up of 2018	Unplaced	
2017	Kim Young-geun	김영근	Daegu	2nd Runner-Up of 2017	Did not compete	

=== Man of the World Korea ===
The Runner-up or finalist of Mister International Korea competes in the Man of the World pageant.

W.B.Q
Year	Delegate	Korean Name	Residence	National Title	Placement at MW	Special Awards
2027	Shin Sang-min	신상민	Daegu	2nd Runner-Up of 2026	TBA	TBA
2026	Choi Ju-sung	최주성	Daejeon	2nd Runner-Up of 2025	Did not compete	
2025	Jeon Hyeong-sik	전형식	Seoul	Finalist of 2023	Unplaced	4 Special Awards: (bronze) Best in Formal Wear; Top 10 - Mister Photogenic; Top 10 - Mister Personality; Top 10 - Mister Congeniality
2025	Park Hee-geon	박희건	Sacheon	2nd Runner-Up of 2024	Did not compete	
2024	Kim Min-seong	김민성	Goyang	Best Manners Award of 2023	Unplaced	4 Special Awards: (silver) Mister Photogenic; Top 10 - Best in Swimwear; Top 10 - Best in Beachwear; Top 10 - Mister Personality
2024	Jung Hae-won	정해원	Seoul	2nd Runner-Up of 2023	Did not compete (Injury)	
2023	Kim Jin-wook	김진욱	Seoul	2nd Runner-Up of 2022	Man of the World 2023	7 Special Awards: (gold) Mister Congeniality; (gold) Best in Beachwear; (gold) Best in Formal Wear; (silver) Fashion of the World; (bronze) Best in Swimwear; (bronze) Mister Photogenic; Top 10 - Best Physique
2022	Woo Chang-wook	우창욱	Pohang	Appointed	Top 10	2 Special Awards: (gold) Fashion of the World; (bronze) Mr. Congeality
2022	Cho Yong-tae	조용태	Seoul	1st Runner-Up of 2021	Did not compete (COVID-19 pandemic, Postponed)	
2021	Moon Seong-hun	문성훈	Gwangju	2nd Runner-Up of 2020	Due to the impact of COVID-19 pandemic, no competition held	
2020	Moon Tae-joon	문태준	Jeju, Jeju	2nd Runner-Up of 2019	Due to the impact of COVID-19 pandemic, no competition held	
2019	Kim Jin-kyu	김진규	Seoul	2nd Runner-Up of 2018	Man of the World 2019 (Appointed)	5 Special Awards: SHA-WRAPS Ambassador; Dipolog City People’s Choice; (gold) Best in Formal Wear; (silver) Fashion of the World; (bronze) Best in Swimwear
2018	Kim Gil-hwan	김길환	Gwangju	Top 11 of 2017	Top 10	1 Special Awards: (silver) Best in Resort Wear
2018	Ahn Seong-hwan	안성환	Seoul	3rd Runner-Up of 2017	Did not compete	
2017	Jung Goo-young	정구영	Seoul	Mister International Korea 2016	Top 18	

=== Mister Cosmo Korea ===
W.B.Q
Year	Delegate	Korean Name	Residence	National Title	Placement at MCM	Special Awards
2027	Lee Jong-hyun	이종현	Seoul	2nd Runner-Up of 2026	TBA	TBA

=== Man of The Year Korea ===
W.B.Q
Year	Delegate	Korean Name	Residence	National Title	Placement at MY	Special Awards
2026	Kim Jae-yoon	김재윤	Pohang	Sukhyun Hanbok Best Manner Award	TBA	TBA
2026	Kim Seung-han	김승한	Daegu	3rd Runner-Up of 2026	Did not compete	
2025	Kim Jun-hyeok	김준혁	Seoul	2nd Runner-Up of 2025	Unplaced	1 Special Awards: Best in Lifestyle
2024	Jeon Won-gi	전원기	Seoul	3rd Runner-Up of 2024	Top 8	
2023	Seok Bo-geun	석보근	Daegu	3rd Runner-Up of 2023	Top 8	1 Special Awards: Top 3 - Manly
2022	Lee Joo-yong	이주용	Busan	Finalist of 2021	3rd Runner-Up	4 Special Awards: Best in Lifestyle; Spokesman; Top 3 - Masculine; Top 3 - Mindful
Due to the impact of COVID-19 pandemic, no competition held between 2020 and 2021
2019	Lee Ho-jin	이호진	Anyang, Gyeonggi	Top 17 of 2019	Man of The Year 2019	3 Special Awards: Most Cute Man; Top 3 - Best Talent; Top 3 - Best Body
2019	Kim Gyung-ho	김경호	Bundang	2nd Runner-Up of 2018	Did not compete	
2018	Jang Yoon-sung	장윤성	Seoul	Top 11 of 2017	Top 10	3 Special Awards: Mister Physique; Best Sexy Model; Masculine
2018	Jung Hyo-bin	정효빈	Incheon	4th Runner-Up of 2017	Did not compete	

=== Mister Friendship Korea ===
W.B.Q
Year	Delegate	Korean Name	Residence	National Title	Placement at MF	Special Awards
2026	Kim Woo-hyeuk	김우혁	Iksan, Jeonbuk	2nd Runner-Up of 2026	TBA	TBA
2025	Jo Eun-il	조은일	Daegu	Influencer of 2025	Top 16	1 Special Awards: Mister Friendship Asia
2025	Oh Ji-seok	오지석	Daejeon	2nd Runner-Up of 2025	Did not compete	
2024	Lee Hee-yoon	이희윤	Gunpo, Gyeonggi	2nd Runner-Up of 2024	Unplaced	
2023	Ko Jun-hyeok	고준혁	Gyeonggi	2nd Runner-Up of 2023	Top 10 (5th Runner-Up)	1 Special Awards: Best Physique
2022	Yoo Byeong-eun	유병은	Cheongju, Chungbuk	2nd Runner-Up of 2022	Mister Friendship International 2022	4 Special Awards: Best in Swimsuit Winner; Mister Photogenic; Aura Rich Man Award; 2nd r-up - Khon Kaen
2021	Woo Chang-wook	우창욱	Pohang	Appointed	Unplaced (Virtually)	
2021	Lee Jae-ho	이재호	Asan	2nd Runner-Up of 2021	Due to the impact of COVID-19 pandemic, Did not compete	

=== Mister Cosmopolitan Korea ===
W.B.Q
Year	Delegate	Korean Name	Residence	National Title	Placement at MC	Special Awards
2026	Lee Seung-jae	이승재	Seoul	Cosmopolitan Award of 2026	Unplaced	1 Special Awards: Best in Talent
2025	Kim Han-young	김한영	Mokpo	Finalist of 2024	Unplaced	2 Special Awards: Best Catwalk; 1st r-up - Fan Vote
2024	Shin Jae-min	신재민	Gyeongbuk	2nd Runner-Up of 2024	3rd Runner-up	
2023	Lee Ji-hun	이지훈	Seoul	Cosmopolitan Award of 2023	Top 8	1 Special Awards: Asia-Oceania

=== Mister Celebrity International Korea ===
W.B.Q
Year	Delegate	Korean Name	Residence	National Title	Placement at MCI	Special Awards
2026	Kim Seung-han	김승한	Daegu	3rd Runner-Up of 2026	TBA	TBA
2026	Jun Yi-soo	전이수	Busan	3rd Runner-Up of 2026	Did not compete	
2025	Kim Jin-hyeong	김진형	Seoul	3rd Runner-Up of 2025	Top 10	1 Special Awards: Best in Tuxedo
2024	Kim Jae-hee	김재희	Chungbuk	Celebrity Award of 2024	Top 15	1 Special Awards: Best in Tuxedo

=== Mister Fitness Supermodel World Korea ===
W.B.Q
Year	Delegate	Korean Name	Residence	National Title	Placement at MFS	Special Awards
2027	Lee Jin-soo	이진수	Busan	NAVI Plastic Surgery World Contest Award of 2026	TBA	TBA
2026	Lee Yong-Seok	이용석	Incheon	3rd Runner-Up of 2025	Did not compete	
2025	Kim Dae-hyun	김대현	Gyeongsan	Finalist of 2023	Unplaced	1 Special Awards: Mister Formal Wear
2025	Kwon Hyuk-joong	권혁중	Seoul	3rd Runner-Up of 2024	Did not compete	
2024	Kim Sung-jun	김성준	Jeonju, Jeonbuk	Best Body Award of 2023	Top 10	2 Special Awards: Best in Sportswear; Top 3 – Best Body
2023	Jin Seok-hyun	진석현	Seoul	Finalist of 2022	Unplaced	2 Special Awards: 2nd r-up - Mister Talent; 1st r-up - Best in Fashion

=== Mister Eco International Korea ===
W.B.Q
Year	Delegate	Korean Name	Residence	National Title	Placement at ME	Special Awards
2027	Park Jin-hyun	박진현	Jinju, Gyeongnam	Herb Gold Best Skin Award of 2026	TBA	TBA
2026	Na Hyun-seok	나현석	Seoul	Finalist of 2025	Unplaced	1 Special Awards: Best Catwalk
2026	Lee Man-yeol	이만열	Gyeonggi	Mister Eco Award of 2025	Did not compete	
2018	Jang Yoon-sung	장윤성	Seoul	Top 11 of 2017	Pageant not held	

=== Mister Grand International Korea ===
W.B.Q
Year	Delegate	Korean Name	Residence	National Title	Placement at MGI	Special Awards
2023	Hwang Jun-sung	황준성	Seoul	2nd Runner-Up of 2023	(Top 6) 4th Runner-Up	4 Special Awards: Limitless Potential; 2nd Runner-Up - Best in National Costume; Top 12 - High Fashion Formal Wear; Top 12 - High Fashion Sportswear

=== Mister Universe Tourism Korea ===
W.B.Q
Year	Delegate	Korean Name	Residence	National Title	Placement at MUT	Special Awards
2025	Kim Han-young	김한영	Mokpo	Finalist of 2024	Pageant not held	

=== Mister Tourism & Culture Universe Korea ===
W.B.Q
Year	Delegate	Korean Name	Residence	National Title	Placement at MTC	Special Awards
2020	Cho In-hwan	조인환	Seoul	2nd Runner-Up of 2019	Due to the impact of COVID-19 pandemic, no competition held	
2019	Cheon Dong-hun	천동훈	Busan	2nd Runner-Up of 2018	2nd Runner Up	2 Special Awards: Missosologist's Choice Award; Best Physique
2018	Yoo Su-jae	유수재	Gwangju	4th Runner-Up of 2016	Mister Tourism & Culture Universe 2018	2 Special Awards: Top 3 - Best Presentation; Top 3 - Swimwear

=== Mister National Universe Korea ===
W.B.Q
Year	Delegate	Korean Name	Residence	National Title	Placement at MNU	Special Awards
2023	Hong Seok-jin	홍석진	Daegu	2nd Runner-Up of 2022	Did not compete	
2022	Kim Dong-hun	김동훈	Busan	Best Influencer Award of 2021	2nd runner-up (Mister National Globe)	

=== Man Hot Star International Korea ===
W.B.Q
Year	Delegate	Korean Name	Residence	National Title	Placement at MH	Special Awards
2024	Park Jun-hyoung	박준형	Busan	Finalist of 2024	(Top 6) 3rd Runner-up	2 Special Awards: API Clinic Cash Voucher Award; 1st r-up - Popular Vote
2023	Jo Seong-hyeon	조성현	Seoul	3rd Runner-Up of 2023	2nd Runner-up	
2022	Kim Joo-young	김주영	Mokpo, Jeonnam	Best Physique Award of 2022	4th Runner-Up	1 Special Awards: Top 6 - Swimsuite

=== Mister Model Worldwide Korea ===
W.B.Q
Year	Delegate	Korean Name	Residence	National Title	Placement at MMW	Special Awards
2023	Kim You-soo	김유수	Seoul	1st Runner-Up of 2022	Pageant not held	
2019	Kim Hyun-joong	김현중	Seoul	2nd Runner-Up of 2019	1st Runner-up	2 Special Awards: Face of the Year; 2nd place - Mister Perfect Body
2018	Kim Gyung-ho	김경호	Bundang	2nd Runner-Up of 2018	Unplaced	2 Special Awards: Best Runway Model; 1st r-up - Mister Perfect Body

=== Mister Universe Model Korea ===
W.B.Q
Year	Delegate	Korean Name	Residence	National Title	Placement at MUM	Special Awards
2011	Seo Sang-woo	서상우	Seoul	Appointed	Unplaced	1 Special Awards: Best Original Costume

=== Mister Tourism World Korea ===
W.B.Q
Year	Delegate	Korean Name	Residence	National Title	Placement at MTW	Special Awards
2018	Baek Jun-hyeon	백준현	Incheon	Best Body Award of 2018	Unplaced	1 Special Awards: 1st r-up - Best Runway Model

=== Mister Model International Korea ===
W.B.Q
Year	Delegate	Korean Name	Residence	National Title	Placement at MMI	Special Awards
2016	Choi Byeong-jun	최병준	Chuncheon	2nd Runner-Up of 2016	Top 17	1 Special Awards: Best Physique

=== Mister Landscapes International Korea ===
W.B.Q
Year	Delegate	Korean Name	Residence	National Title	Placement at ML	Special Awards
2020	Lee Jung-woo	이정우	Seoul	3rd Runner-Up of 2019	Due to the impact of COVID-19 pandemic, no competition held	
2019	Lee Kyeong-hoon	이경훈	Bucheon	Finalist of 2018	Top 4	

=== Mister Asia Korea ===
W.B.Q
Year	Delegate	Korean Name	Residence	National Title	Placement at MA	Special Awards
2014	Park Young-ho	박영호	Incheon	3rd Runner-Up of 2013	4th place	

=== The Best Male Model of the Universe Korea ===
W.B.Q
Year	Delegate	Korean Name	Residence	National Title	Placement at TBM	Special Awards
2022	Yea Seong-beom	예성범	Busan	3rd Runner-Up of 2021	Did not compete (Postponed)	

== World Beauty Queen ==
World Beauty Queen 월드 뷰티 퀸
- Formation: 2015; 11 years ago
- Type: Beauty pageant
- Headquarters: Seoul
- Location: South Korea
- Members: Miss Supranational; Miss Cosmo; Miss Aura International; Supermodel International; Miss Friendship International; Miss Tourism Planet International; Miss Celebrity Internationatioanl; World Beauty Queen
- Official language: Korean
- President: Ricky Junghoon Jun
- Website: website

World Beauty Queen (Korean: 월드 뷰티 퀸) is an annual national beauty pageant responsible for selecting South Korea's representatives to the Miss Supranational, Miss Cosmo, Miss Aura International, Supermodel International, Miss Friendship International, Miss Tourism Planet International, Miss Celebrity Internationational and other beauty pageants.

=== Placements at international pageants ===
==== Current licenses ====
- 1 placements at Miss Supranational. The highest result is Yu Hyeon-jeong as Top 24 of 2025.
- 1 placements at Miss Aura International. The highest result is Koo Ji-eun as Top 20 of 2024.
- 4 placements at Supermodel International. The highest result is Yoo Ji-hyun as 2nd Runner-up of Supermodel International 2018.
- 4 placements at Miss Tourism Planet International. The highest result is Jo Nam-hee as 2nd Runner-up of Miss Tourism Planet International 2020.

==== Past licenses ====
- 3 placements at Miss Intercontinental. The highest result is Yoo Han-na as 1st Runner-up of 2007.
- 1 placements at Miss Tourism International. The highest result is Yoo Ji-hyun as Top 10 of 2018.
- 2 placements at Beauty of the World. The highest result is Oh Sa-rah as Top 5 of 2013.

=== Titles ===
Number of wins from World Beauty Queen (past licenses)
Pageant	Wins
Miss Intercontinental	0
Miss Tourism International	0
Queen of the World	0
Beauty of the World	0
Top Model of the World	0
Face of Beauty International	0
Miss Motors International	0
Miss Freedom of the World	0
Miss Tourism Queen of the Year International	0
Miss Tourism Metropolitan International	0
Miss Tourism Intercontinental	0
Miss Oriental Tourism	0

Number of wins from World Beauty Queen (current licenses)
Pageant	Wins
Miss Supranational	0
Miss Cosmo	0
Miss Aura International	0
Supermodel International	0
Miss Friendship International	0
Miss Tourism Planet International	0
Miss Celebrity Internationational	0
World Beauty Queen	0

Note that the year designates the time World Beauty Queen has acquired that particular pageant franchise.

Current

- Miss Supranational (2022–present)
- Miss Cosmo (2025–present)
- Miss Aura International (2022–present)
- Supermodel International (2011–present)
- Miss Friendship International (2025–present)
- Miss Tourism Planet International (2010–present)
- Miss Celebrity Internationatioanl (2025–present)
- World Beauty Queen (2015–present)

Past

- Miss Intercontinental (2004–2008)
- Miss Tourism International (2006–2023)
- Queen of the World (2006–2007)
- Beauty of the World (2009–2010, 2013)
- Top Model of the World (2005–2007)
- Face of Beauty International (2012)
- Miss Motors International (2011)
- Miss Freedom of the World (2010)
- Miss Tourism Queen of the Year International (2015)
- Miss Tourism Metropolitan International (2016)
- Miss Tourism Intercontinental (2010)
- Miss Oriental Tourism (2012)

=== Titleholders ===
Year	Miss Supranational Korea	Runners Up		Special Awards	Final Entrants	Ref.
Year	Miss Supranational Korea	First	Second	Special Awards	Final Entrants	Ref.
2025^{[α]}	Yu Hyeon-jeong	Woo Hae-su, Kim Seol-ha	Kim Gyu-ri, Ham Se-young, Kim Ah-hyun	Semi Kwon, Lee Seo-yul, Jaewon Kim, Jinah Park, Hyewon Park, Bae Ji-woo, Son Hye-im, Baek Eun-ha	18	

Note:
- ^α Hosted by World Beauty Queen and Organized by SY Personal Brand.

== Representatives to international beauty pageants ==
=== Current licenses ===
Color keys

- : Declared as Winner
- : Ended as runner-up
- : Ended as top 5/6 qualification
- : Ended as one of the finalists or semifinalists
- : Ended as special awards

=== Miss Supranational Korea ===
Began 2022 the license handed to Mister International Korea (World Beauty Queen) which also selected Korean representation at Mister Supranational pageant under Miss Supranational Management.

W.B.Q
Year	Delegate	Korean Name	Residence	National Title	Placement at MS	Special Awards
2026	Lee Yoon-jeong	이윤정	Seoul	Appointed: Note: Miss Chungbuk Sejong Mi 2015	Unplaced	1 Special Awards: Confidence Round (Fan Vote)
2025	Yu Hyeon-jeong	유현정	Daegu	Miss Supranational Korea 2025: Note: Miss Daegu 2024 Wildcard & Miss Korea 2024 Finalist & Korea Supermodel 2025 Finalists	Top 24	1 Special Awards: Top 10 - Supra Fan Vote
2024	Choi Jeong-eun	최정은	Seoul	Appointed: Miss Korea Global 2024 & Miss Korea 2024 Friendship Award	Withdrew	
2023	Roh Ju-hyeon	노주현	Seoul	Appointed: Miss Korea Global 2023 Special Award	Unplaced	1 Special Awards: Miss Talent Winner
2022	Song Che-ryun	송채련	Seoul	Appointed	Unplaced	1 Special Awards: Top 28 - Miss Talent
List of Miss Supranational Participant from 2014 to 2021, List of Miss Supranational Participant from 2010

=== Miss Cosmo Korea ===
W.B.Q
Year	Delegate	Korean Name	Residence	National Title	Placement at MCI	Special Awards
2026	TBA					
2025	Woo Hae-su	우해수	Ulsan	1st Runner-Up of 2025: Note: 1st Runner-Up of Miss Ulsan 2024 & TOP 15 of Miss Korea 2024	Withdrew (health reasons)	1 Special Awards: Top 26 - Cosmo Impactful Beauty Award

=== Miss Aura International Korea ===
W.B.Q
Year	Delegate	Korean Name	Residence	National Title	Placement at MAI	Special Awards
2026	Kim Seol-ha	김설하	Seoul	1st Runner-Up of 2025	Did not compete	
2025	Kang Han-na	강한나	Seoul	Appointed	Withdrew	
2024	Koo Ji-eun	구지은	Seoul	Appointed	Top 20	2 Special Awards: Miss Friendship; Top 13 - Intelligence
2023	Kim Ju-yeon	김주연	Seoul	Appointed	Unplaced	1 Special Awards: Miss Bikini Winner
2022	Park Seung-eun	박승은	Seoul	Appointed	Unplaced	

=== Supermodel International Korea ===
W.B.Q
Year	Delegate	Korean Name	Residence	National Title	Placement at SI	Special Awards
2026	Baek Eun-ha	백은하	Seoul	Skin Model of 2025	Did not compete	
2019	Jo Nam-hee	조남희	Seoul	Appointed	4th runner up	
2018	Yoo Ji-hyun	유지현	Chungbuk	Appointed: Miss Sejong Chungbuk 2016	2nd Runner-up	
2016	Yoon So-hee	윤소희	Seoul	Appointed	Top 15	1 Special Awards: Asia Pacific
2011	Lee Min-hee	이민희	Seoul	Appointed	Top 15	1 Special Awards: Tourism Ambassador

=== Miss Friendship Korea ===
W.B.Q
Year	Delegate	Korean Name	Residence	National Title	Placement at FDI	Special Awards
2025	Park Jin-ju	박진주	Seoul	Appointed: Miss Earth Korea 2025 Talent Award	Unplaced	2 Special Awards: Miss Congeniality Award; JEHOO Global Brand Ambassador
2025	Ham Se-young	함세영	Seoul	2nd Runner-Up of 2025	Did not compete	

=== Miss Tourism Planet International Korea ===
W.B.Q
Year	Delegate	Korean Name	Residence	National Title	Placement at MTP	Special Awards
2025	Kim Gyu-ri	김규리	Seoul	2nd Runner-Up of 2025: Note: Miss Gyeongbuk 2025 Manners Award & Miss Grand Korea 2025	Did not compete	
2020	Jo Nam-hee	조남희	Seoul	Appointed	2nd Runner-up	
2017	Sun Eun-ji	선은지	Busan	Appointed: Supermodel Korea 2017 2nd place	3rd Runner-up	3 Special Awards: Miss Tourism Asia; Miss Photogenic; Miss Fashion Model
2014	Moon Ga-bi	문가비	Incheon	Appointed	Unplaced	1 Special Awards: Press Award
2011	Hyun-hong Ryu	유현홍	Seoul	Appointed	Top 8	1 Special Awards: Miss Asia Award
2010	Kim Hye-ra	김혜라	Seoul	Appointed	Top 8	1 Special Awards: Congeniality Award

=== Miss Celebrity Internationatioanl Korea ===
W.B.Q
Year	Delegate	Korean Name	Residence	National Title	Placement at MC	Special Awards
2025	Kim Ah-hyun	김아현	Seoul	2nd Runner-Up of 2025	Did not compete	

=== World Beauty Queen Korea ===
W.B.Q
Year	Delegate	Korean Name	Residence	National Title	Placement at WBQ	Special Awards
2019	Kim Ga-young	김가영	Seoul	Appointed	Unplaced	1 Special Awards: Top Model
2018	Park Ji-na	박지나	Seoul	Appointed	Top 13	1 Special Awards: Miss Tas C&M
2017	Kim Jang-Mi	김장미	Seoul	Appointed	Top 16	1 Special Awards: People's Choice
2016	Kim Ga-ram	김가람	Seoul	Appointed	Top 14	
2015	Park Na-Young	박나영	Seoul	Appointed	Top 9	

=== Miss Intercontinental Korea ===
W.B.Q
Year	Delegate	Korean Name	Residence	National Title	Placement at MIC	Special Awards
List of Miss Intercontinental Participant from 2009 to 2010
2008	Park Eun-sil	박은실	Seoul	Appointed: World Miss University Korea Finalist	Top 15	
2007	Yoo Han-na	유한나	Seoul	Appointed: 2nd Runner-up of Miss Seoul 2007	1st Runner-up	
2006	Song Il-Young	송일영	Seoul	Appointed: 2nd Runner-up of Miss Seoul 2005	Top 12	1 Special Awards: Best National Costume
List of Miss Intercontinental Participant from 1977 to 1978

=== Miss Tourism International Korea ===
W.B.Q
Year	Delegate	Korean Name	Residence	National Title	Placement at MTI	Special Awards
2023	Lee Ha-young	이하영	Seoul	Appointed	Unplaced	
2022	Park Se-a	박세아	Ulsan	Appointed: 2nd Runner-up of Miss Busan 2022	Unplaced	1 Special Awards: Miss Popularity
2021	Jung Chae-yeon	정채연	Seoul	Appointed	Unplaced	
2020	Jo Nam-hee	조남희	Seoul	Appointed	Unplaced	
2018	Yoo Ji-hyun	유지현	Chungbuk	Appointed: Miss Sejong Chungbuk 2016	Top 10	2 Special Awards: Miss Wellness; Miss Beautiful Skin
2017	Kim Na-yeon	김나연	Daegu	Appointed: 2nd r-up - Miss Korea 2012	Unplaced	1 Special Awards: Miss Sogo Trendsetter
2014	Hyun-hong Ryu	유현홍	Seoul	Appointed	Unplaced	
2013	Noh Kyung min	노경민	Seoul	Appointed	Unplaced	2 Special Awards: Miss Charity Queen; Top 5 – Best in National Costume
2012	Sarah Oh	오사라	United States	Miss Tourism Korea 2012	Did not compete	
2009	Do Yeon-ju	도연주	Seoul	Appointed	Unplaced	1 Special Awards: Best Talent Award
2008	Shin Sun-ah	신선아	Seoul	Appointed	Unplaced	1 Special Awards: Best National Costume
2006	Jin-lee Yoon	윤진이	Seoul	Appointed	Unplaced	

=== Queen of the World Korea ===
W.B.Q
Year	Delegate	Korean Name	Residence	National Title	Placement at QW	Special Awards
2007	Seong Min-a	성민아	Jeju, Jeju	Appointed: Miss Jeju 2007	Unplaced	2 Special Awards: Miss Photogenic; Peace Award
2006	Jin-lee Yoon	윤진이	Gyeongnam	Appointed	Top 10	

=== Beauty of the World Korea ===
W.B.Q
Year	Delegate	Korean Name	Residence	National Title	Placement at BW	Special Awards
2013	Sarah Oh	오사라	United States	Appointed	5th place	
2010	Lee Bo-yeon	이보연	Seoul	Appointed	Unplaced	1 Special Awards: Miss Congeniality
2009	Yang Young-hwa	양영화	Seoul	Appointed	Top 10	1 Special Awards: Miss Photogenic

=== Top Model of the World Korea ===
W.B.Q
Year	Delegate	Korean Name	Residence	National Title	Placement at TM	Special Awards
2007	Yang Young-hwa	양영화	Seoul	Appointed	Unplaced	
2006	Song Il-Young	송일영	Seoul	Appointed	Unplaced	
2005	Jin-lee Yoon	윤진이	Seoul	Appointed	Unplaced	

=== Face of Beauty International Korea ===
W.B.Q
Year	Delegate	Korean Name	Residence	National Title	Placement at FB	Special Awards
2012	Lee Se-i	이세이	Seoul	Appointed	Unplaced	

=== Miss Motors International Korea ===
W.B.Q
Year	Delegate	Korean Name	Residence	National Title	Placement at MMI	Special Awards
2011	Hyun-hong Ryu	유현홍	Seoul	Appointed	Unplaced	

=== Miss Freedom of the World Korea ===
W.B.Q
Year	Delegate	Korean Name	Residence	National Title	Placement at MFW	Special Awards
2010	Kang Bo-ram	강보람	Seoul	Appointed	Top 10	1 Special Awards: Best National Costume

=== Miss Tourism Queen of the Year International Korea ===
W.B.Q
Year	Delegate	Korean Name	Residence	National Title	Placement at MTQY	Special Awards
2015	Sun Eun-ji	선은지	Busan	Appointed	Unplaced	

=== Miss Tourism Metropolitan International Korea ===
W.B.Q
Year	Delegate	Korean Name	Residence	National Title	Placement at MTM	Special Awards
2016	Kim Min-seo	김민서	Seoul	Appointed	Unplaced	

=== Miss Tourism Intercontinental Korea ===
W.B.Q
Year	Delegate	Korean Name	Residence	National Title	Placement at MTIC	Special Awards
2010	Choi Han-na	최한나	Seoul	Appointed	Unplaced	1 Special Awards: Miss Goodwill Miri

=== Miss Oriental Tourism Korea ===
W.B.Q
Year	Delegate	Korean Name	Residence	National Title	Placement at MOT	Special Awards
2012	Noh Kyung-min	노경민	Seoul	Appointed	Unplaced	1 Special Awards: Miss Press Princess

== See also ==
- Mister International
- Mister Global
- Mister Supranational
- Man of the World
- Miss Cosmo
- Miss Korea
- Miss Queen Korea
- Miss Grand Korea
- Mister World Korea
- Mister Korea
- Miss International Korea
- Miss Earth Korea
- Miss and Mister Supranational Korea
- Miss and Mister World Korea
- Miss and Mister Korea beauty pageants
- Miss Universe Korea Representative
