= Mr World Vietnam =

- Logo of Mr World Vietnam
- Formation: 2024
- Founder: Sen Vàng Entertainment
- Type: Men national beauty pageant
- Headquarters: Ho Chi Minh City
- Location: Vietnam
- Members: Mister World
- National Director: Phạm Kim Dung
- Key people: Julia Morley

Mr World Vietnam (Vietnamese: Nam vương Thế giới Việt Nam) is a beauty contest for men, aiming to find outstanding representatives in appearance, intelligence, talent and moral qualities to participate in international beauty arenas such as Mister World. The contest is held periodically and receives great attention from the media, the public, especially the youth. The current Mr World Vietnam titleholder is Phạm Tuấn Ngọc from Haiphong, who was crowned on July 14, 2024.

Looking for worthy representatives with outstanding appearance, good knowledge, bravery and masculine style to represent Vietnam in the international beauty arena. At the same time, honoring the beauty of men, changing the perception of the image of modern men — not only strong, in the field but also elegant, intelligent and responsible to society. On the other hand, promoting the development of culture—tourism, the image of the country — Vietnamese people to international friends. Finally, building an ideal male model, inspiring the passion for extreme living for the young generation, encouraging physical training, morality and spirit to contribute to the community.

== History ==
In 2007, the first representative of Vietnam at the Mr World 2007 contest was Hồ Đức Vĩnh, but he did not achieve any results. Then in 2012, Trương Nam Thành became the second representative at the Mr World 2012 and reached the top 10. Over the years, Vietnam has had impressive achievements in a number of international male beauty contests, however, in Mister World alone, Vietnam's achievements were very low.

By 2024, Sen Vàng Entertainment (the organizer of Miss World Vietnam) had established the Mr World Vietnam contest, with a systematic approach. Although Vietnam has many national beauty contests, there is only one national contest for men, Mr World Vietnam. And the third representative, Mr World Vietnam 2024 – Phạm Tuấn Ngọc, has achieved the first runner-up position simultaneously Vietnam successfully hosted the Mr World 2024 contest.

== Editions ==
=== Titleholders ===
Year	Mr World Vietnam	1st Runner-Up	2nd Runner-Up	Venue	#
2024	Phạm Tuấn Ngọc; Hải Phòng City	Võ Minh Toại; Bình Định province	Đinh Ta Bi; Gia Lai province	Nguyễn Du Indoor Stadium, District 1, Ho Chi Minh City	29
2026	TBA				

=== Regional rankings ===
Province/City	Titles	Winning years
Hải Phòng City	1	2024

== Vietnam's representatives at international beauty pageant ==
Color keys

- : Declared as Winner
- : Ended as Runner-up or Top 5
- : Ended as one of the finalists
- : Ended as one of the semi-finalists
- : Ended as special awards winner

=== Main pageant ===
==== Mister World ====
Year	Mr World Vietnam	National title	Province	Result	Prize	Ref.
2024	Phạm Tuấn Ngọc	Mr World Vietnam 2024	Hải Phòng City	1st Runner-Up	7 Special Awards: Mister World Asia & Oceania; Top 05 – Beauty With a Purpose; Top 05 – Talent; Top 12 – Top Model; Top 17 – Multimedia; Top 20 – Head-to-Head Challenge; Top 20 – Best National Costume	
2019	Trần Công Hậu	Appointed: (1st Runner-Up – Vietnam model fashion 2018)	Quảng Nam province	Did not compete		
2012	Trương Nam Thành	Appointed: (Silver prize – Vietnam Supermodel 2010)	Hồ Chí Minh City	Top 10	2 Special Awards: Mr. World Fashion & Style; Top 10 - Mr. World Talent	
2007	Hồ Đức Vĩnh	—N/a	Hồ Chí Minh City	Unplaced		

=== Other pageant ===
==== Manhunt International ====
Year	Representatives	Province	Result	Prize	Ref.
2002	Nguyễn Bình Minh	Lạng Sơn province	Unplaced		
2006	Lê Quang Hòa	Hà Nội City	Unplaced	1: Top 3 Manhunt Asia	
2007	Ngô Tiến Đoàn	Cần Thơ City	Top 16	1: Mr. Physique	
2008	Nguyễn Văn Thịnh	Hải Phòng City	Unplaced		
2010	Hoàng Gia Ngọc	Hải Phòng City	Unplaced		
2011	Trương Nam Thành	Hồ Chí Minh City	3rd Runner-Up	1: Mr. Internet Popularity	
2012	Nguyễn Quang Huân	Bình Thuận province	Unplaced	1: 1st Runner-up – Best National Costume	
2016	Vũ Hoàng Tuấn	Hồ Chí Minh City	Unplaced		
2017	Trương Ngọc Tình	Hồ Chí Minh City	Winner	3: Mr. Internet Popularity; Best Fashion Model; Face of the Year	
2018	Mai Tuấn Anh	Hưng Yên province	4th Runner-Up		
2020	Phạm Đình Lĩnh	Hà Nội City	Top 16	5: Winner Rudy Project's Choice (Sponsor); Mr World Balance Top Model (Sponsor); Mr FOX Undergarment (Sponsor); Mr Rancio De Baluyot (Sponsor); Best Runway Model	
2022	Trần Mạnh Kiên	Hà Nội City	Unplaced	1: Best Swimwear Model	
2024	Huỳnh Võ Hoàng Sơn	Tuyên Quang province	Unplaced	1: Best Asia Model	
2025	Nguyễn Vũ Linh	Bến Tre	4th Runner-Up		

==== Mister International ====
Year	Representatives	Province	Result	Prize	Ref.
2008	Ngô Tiến Đoàn	Cần Thơ City	Winner	1: Best Body	
2009	Lê Xuân Vĩnh Thụy	Hồ Chí Minh City	Top 15	1: Mr. Photogenic	
2011	Lê Khôi Nguyên	Đồng Tháp province	3rd Runner-Up	1: Top 3 – Best National Costume	
2012	Đỗ Bá Đạt	Hồ Chí Minh City	Unplaced	1: Best National Costume	
2016	Nguyễn Tiến Đạt	Hà Nội City	Top 6	1: Mister Charming Smile	
2017	Trần Minh Trung	Bà Rịa–Vũng Tàu province	Top 5		
2018	Trịnh Văn Bảo	Hải Phòng City	Winner	1: Top 10 – Best National Costume	
2023	Phạm Minh Quyền	Đồng Nai province	Unplaced		
2024	Nguyễn Mạnh Lân	Hà Nội City	1st Runner-Up	1: Top 5 – Best in National Costume	
2025	Đoàn Công Vinh	Tây Ninh province	Top 11	2: Dr. Face Choice; Mr. Photogenic	

==== Mister Global ====
Year	Representatives	Province	Result	Prize	Ref.
2014	Nguyễn Hữu Vi	Hà Nội City	3rd Runner-Up	2: Mister Photogenic; Top 5 – Mister Talent	
2015	Nguyễn Văn Sơn	Thanh Hóa province	Winner	1: Mister Internet Popularity	
2016	Nguyễn Phúc Vĩnh Cường	Đà Nẵng City	Unplaced		
2017	Nguyễn Văn Thuận	Long An province	4th Runner-Up	1: Best Talent	
2018	Mạc Trung Kiên	Hải Dương province	Top 16	1: Best Model	
2019	Nguyễn Hùng Cường	Đồng Nai province	Top 16	1: Mister Internet Popularity	
2021	Danh Chiếu Linh	Kiên Giang province	Winner	1: Top 5 – Mister Na Chuek Favorite	
2022	Thạch Kiêm Mara	Trà Vinh province	Top 15		
2023	Lê Hữu Đạt	Hải Phòng City	4th Runner-Up	2: 1st Runner-Up – Best National Costume; 4th Runner-Up – Mister Katharawichai	
2024	Cao Quốc Thắng	Hồ Chí Minh City	Unplaced		
2025	Đoàn Công Vinh	Tây Ninh province	Unplaced		

==== Man of the World ====
Year	Representatives	Province	Result	Prize	Ref.
2017	Nguyễn Hữu Long	Hồ Chí Minh City	1st Runner-Up	2: Best Formal Wear; Missosology People's Choice	
2018	Cao Xuân Tài	Đà Nẵng City	Winner	4: (gold) Best in Casual Wear; (silver) Best in Swimwear; Mister Pervil; Darlings of the Press	
2019	Tạ Công Phát	Quảng Ngãi province	Top 18	1: 1st Runner-Up – Fashion of the World	
2022	Nguyễn Hữu Anh	Quảng Ngãi province	4th Runner-Up	3: (gold) Best in BAHAG; (bronze) Best in Swimwear; (bronze) Best in National Costume	
2023	Lâm Kim Khánh	Hồ Chí Minh City	4th Runner-Up	3: (gold) Press Favorite; (silver) Best Physique; (bronze) Best in Swimwear	
2024	Đoàn Công Vinh	Tây Ninh province	Top 10	3: (gold) Multimedia Award; (silver) Best Physique; (bronze) Fashion of the World	
2025	Lý Minh Quân	Hồ Chí Minh City	Top 18	2: (silver) Man of the World Charity; (silver) Best Physique	
2026					

==== Mister Supranational ====
Year	Representatives	Province	Result	Prize	Ref.
2019	Trần Mạnh Khang	Hà Nội City	Top 20	1: Top 10 – Supra Fan-Vote	
2022	Bùi Xuân Đạt	Hưng Yên province	Top 10	2: Mister Supranational Asia; Top 5 – Supra Model	
2024	Đỗ Quang Tuyển	Nam Định province	Top 10	3: Mister Supranational Asia; Supra Fan-Vote; Top 8 – Mister Influencer Opportunity	
2025	Nguyễn Minh Khắc	Tây Ninh province	Top 10		

== See also ==
- Miss World Vietnam
