= Mister Egypt =

Mr Egypt
- Formation: 2007
- Type: Male Beauty Pageant
- Headquarters: Cairo
- Location: Egypt
- Members: Mister International; Man of the World; Mister Eco International
- Official language: Arabic
- Organization: Egypt's Ministry of Tourism

Mister Egypt is a national male beauty pageant in Egypt. Major competitive areas are charisma, fitness, good looks and personality. The contest is sponsored by Oriflame Men and is held under the auspices of Egypt's Ministry of Tourism.

Egyptian representatives from the Mister Egypt pageant have participated in various international male beauty competitions, showcasing the country's talent on a global stage, though detailed placements are often limited in documentation.

== Placements ==
The following men have represented Egypt in the international beauty pageants. These are Mister International, Man of the World and Mister Eco International

Color Key

- : Declared as Winner
- : Ended as runner-up or top 5/6 qualification
- : Ended as one of the finalists or semifinalists
- : Ended as special awards winner

=== Mister Egypt International ===
Year	Governorate	Mister Egypt	Placement	Special award(s)
2007	Cairo	Amr Samaha	Unplaced	
Did not compete in 2008
2009	Cairo	Karim Koge	Unplaced	
Did not compete between 2010—2024
2025	Beheira	Mohamed Basa	Top 20	

=== Man of the World ===
Year	Governorate	Mister Egypt	Placement	Special award(s)
2017	Cairo	Mostafa Elezali	Man of the World 2017	Mister Photogenic
2018	Cairo	Ahmed Madkour	Unplaced	
Did not compete between 2019—present

=== Mister Eco International ===
Year	Governorate	Mister Egypt	Placement	Special award(s)
2026	Cairo	Yosef Ali	Mister Eco International 2026	
