= Holohlavy =

- Municipality
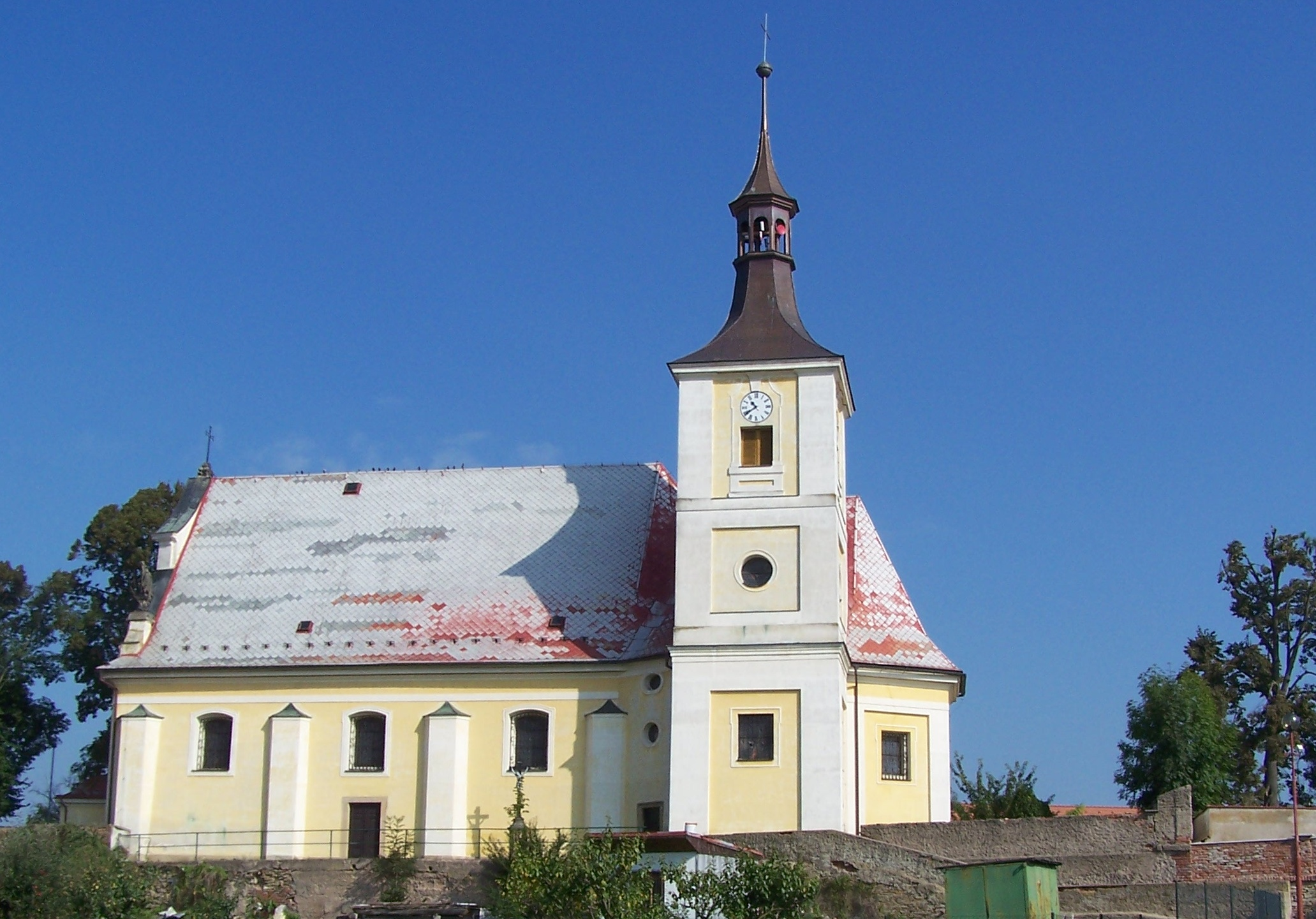
- Church of Saint John the Baptist

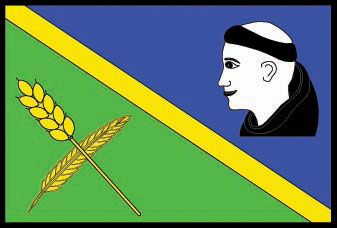
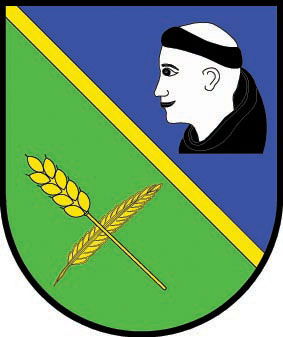
- Flag Coat of arms

- Location in the Czech Republic
- Coordinates: 50°18′29″N 15°51′37″E
- Country: Czech Republic
- Region: Hradec Králové
- District: Hradec Králové
- First mentioned: 1318

Area
  - Total: 5.90 km^{2} (2.28 sq mi)
- Elevation: 254 m (833 ft)

Population (2026-01-01)
  - Total: 916
  - Density: 155/km^{2} (402/sq mi)
- Time zone: UTC+1 (CET)
  - Summer (DST): UTC+2 (CEST)
- Postal code: 503 03
- Website: www.holohlavy.cz

Holohlavy is a municipality and village in Hradec Králové District in the Hradec Králové Region of the Czech Republic. It has about 900 inhabitants.

== Demographics ==
Historical population
Year	Pop.	±%
1869	641	—
1880	828	+29.2%
1890	843	+1.8%
1900	876	+3.9%
1910	820	−6.4%
1921	793	−3.3%
1930	854	+7.7%
1950	608	−28.8%
1961	681	+12.0%
1970	746	+9.5%
1980	705	−5.5%
1991	723	+2.6%
2001	812	+12.3%
2011	869	+7.0%
2021	889	+2.3%
Source: Censuses
