= Nupaky =

- Municipality
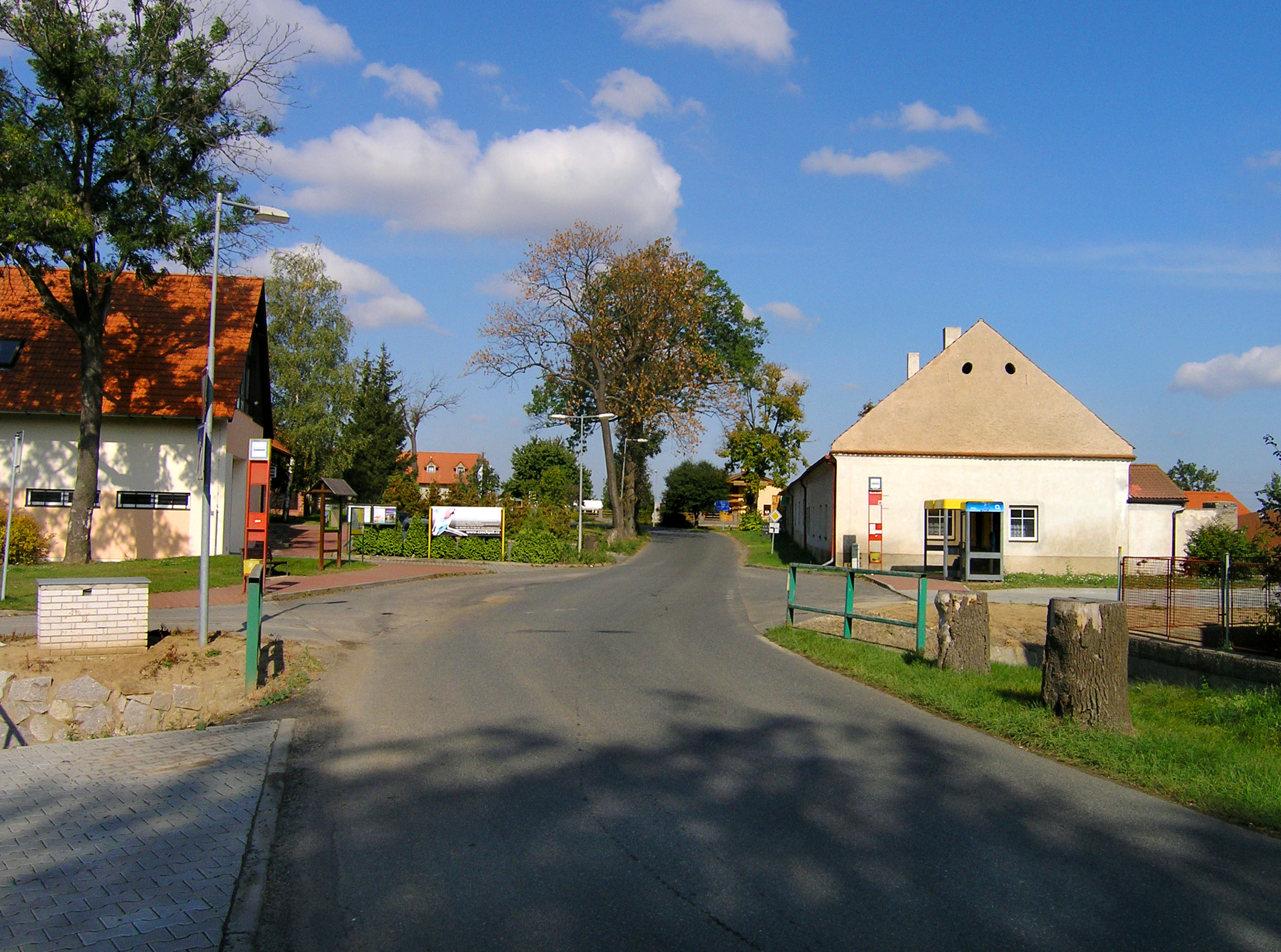
- Common in Nupaky

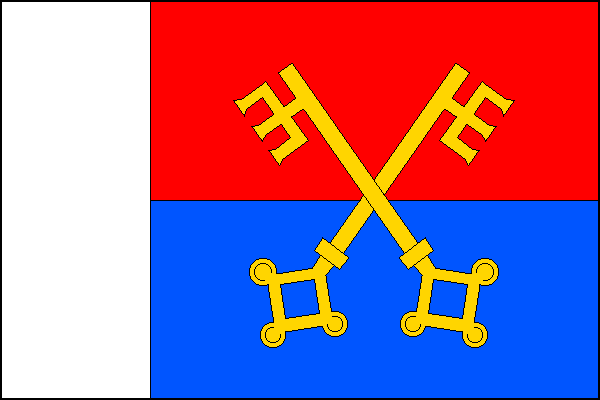
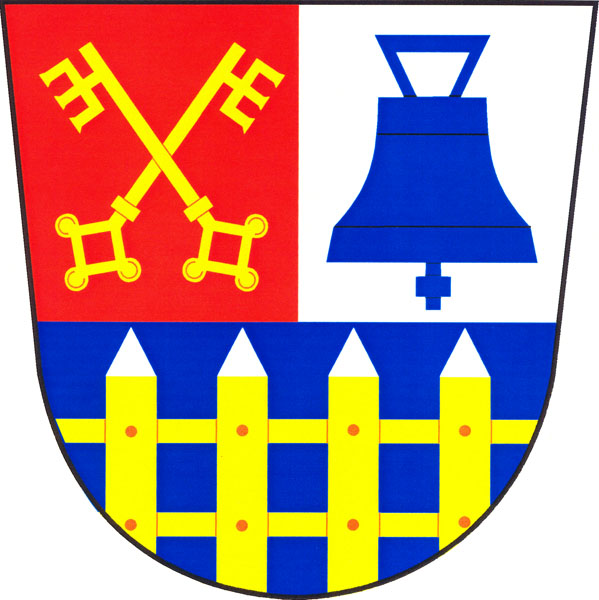
- Flag Coat of arms

- Location in the Czech Republic
- Coordinates: 49°59′38″N 14°36′8″E
- Country: Czech Republic
- Region: Central Bohemian
- District: Prague-East
- First mentioned: 1380

Area
  - Total: 3.18 km^{2} (1.23 sq mi)
- Elevation: 315 m (1,033 ft)

Population (2026-01-01)
  - Total: 2,080
  - Density: 654/km^{2} (1,690/sq mi)
- Time zone: UTC+1 (CET)
  - Summer (DST): UTC+2 (CEST)
- Postal code: 251 01
- Website: www.nupaky.info

Nupaky is a municipality and village in Prague-East District in the Central Bohemian Region of the Czech Republic. It has about 2,100 inhabitants.

== Geography ==
Nupaky is located about 7 kilometres (4 mi) southeast of Prague. It lies in a flat agricultural landscape in the Prague Plateau.

== History ==
The first written mention of Nupaky is from 1380. Until the Hussite Wars, part of the village was owned by the Vyšehrad Chapter and part by a local noble. After the wars, it was owned by a family who called themselves the Lords of Nupaky. From 1514, Nupaky was a part of the Koloděje estate. In 1623, Nupaky was confiscated from Václav Štastný Rous of Vražkov as a result of the Battle of White Mountain. From 1623 until the establishment of an independent municipality in 1848, Nupaky belonged to the Uhříněves estate, owned by the Liechtenstein family.

== Demographics ==
Historical population

Year	Pop.	±%
1869	138	—
1880	164	+18.8%
1890	200	+22.0%
1900	194	−3.0%
1910	165	−14.9%

Year	Pop.	±%
1921	161	−2.4%
1930	223	+38.5%
1950	162	−27.4%
1961	139	−14.2%
1970	128	−7.9%

Year	Pop.	±%
1980	108	−15.6%
1991	81	−25.0%
2001	96	+18.5%
2011	1,054	+997.9%
2021	2,062	+95.6%

Source: Censuses

== Economy ==
Nupaky is known for its industrial zone, which benefits from the proximity of Prague and the motorways.

== Transport ==
Nupaky lies at the junction of D0 and D1 motorways.

== Sights ==
There are no protected cultural monuments in the municipality.
