= Záhoří (Písek District) =

- Municipality
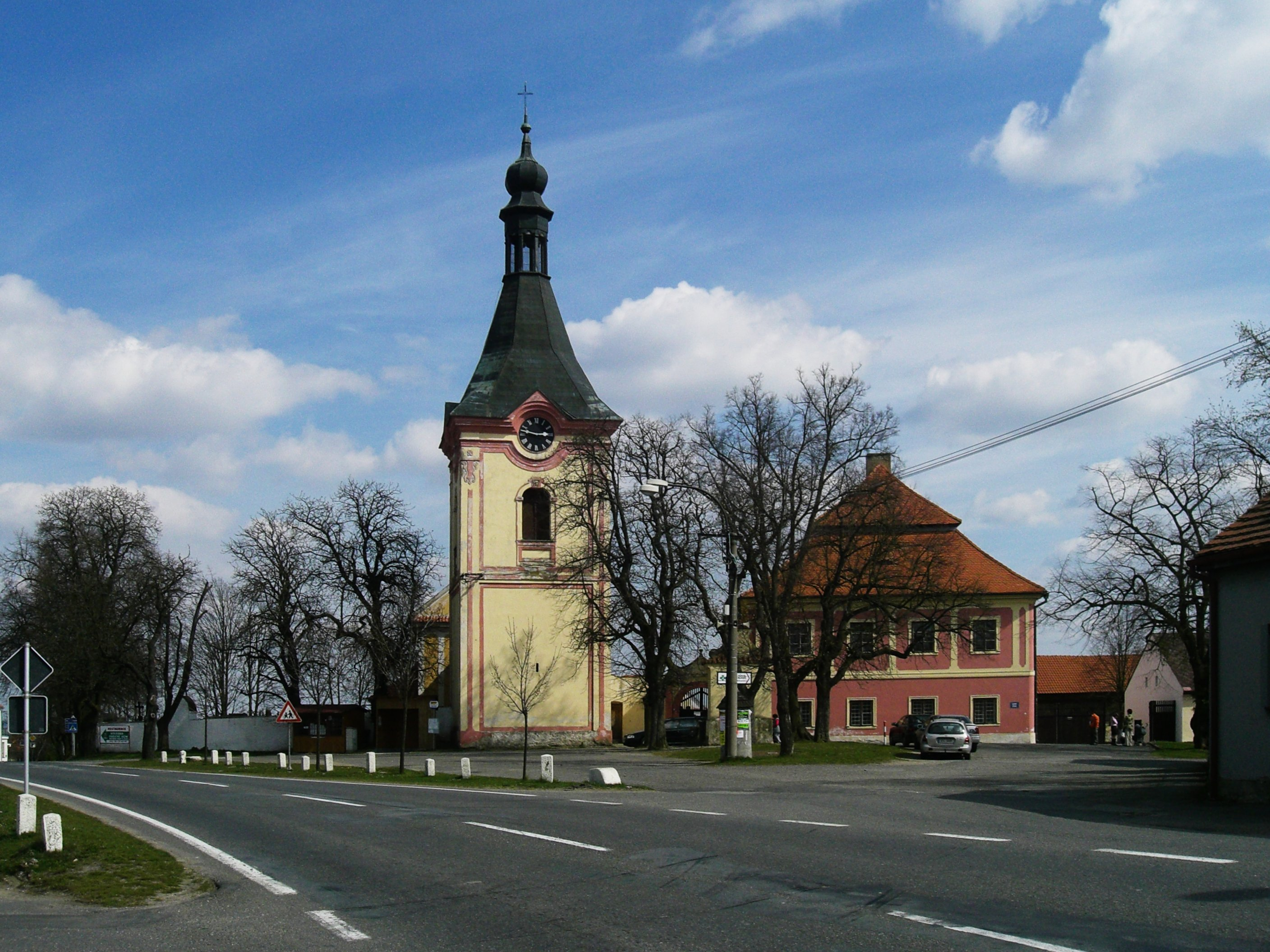
- Church of Saint Michael

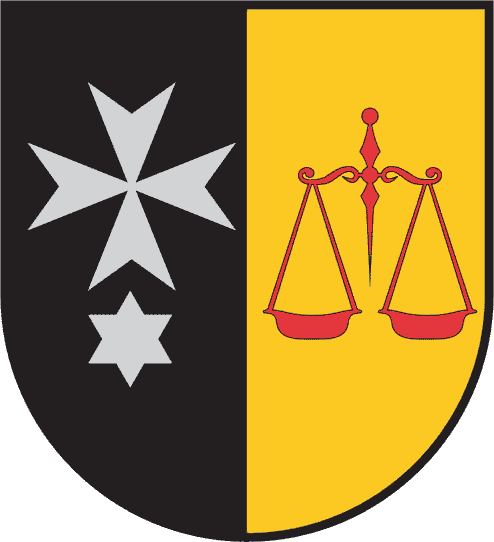
- Flag Coat of arms

- Location in the Czech Republic
- Coordinates: 49°20′59″N 14°12′50″E
- Country: Czech Republic
- Region: South Bohemian
- District: Písek
- First mentioned: 1307

Area
  - Total: 14.72 km^{2} (5.68 sq mi)
- Elevation: 482 m (1,581 ft)

Population (2026-01-01)
  - Total: 789
  - Density: 53.6/km^{2} (139/sq mi)
- Time zone: UTC+1 (CET)
  - Summer (DST): UTC+2 (CEST)
- Postal code: 398 18
- Website: www.zahori.cz

Záhoří is a municipality in Písek District in the South Bohemian Region of the Czech Republic. It has about 800 inhabitants.

== Administrative division ==
Záhoří consists of six municipal parts (in brackets population according to the 2021 census):

- Dolní Záhoří (101)
- Horní Záhoří (397)
- Jamný (104)
- Kašina Hora (61)
- Svatonice (53)
- Třešně (58)

== Etymology ==
The name Záhoří is derived from the location of the settlement za horou, i.e. 'behind the mountain'.

== Geography ==
Záhoří is located about 6 kilometres (4 mi) northeast of Písek and 44 km (27 mi) northwest of České Budějovice. It lies in the Tábor Uplands. The highest point is the hill Na Lomech at 543 m (1,781 ft) above sea level.

== History ==
The first written mention of Záhoří (formerly called Zahoří) is from 1307. The most notable owners of the village were the Švamberk family, who owned it from 1472 to 1622.

== Demographics ==
Historical population

| Year | Pop. | ±% |
|---|---|---|
| 1869 | 1,342 | — |
| 1880 | 1,269 | −5.4% |
| 1890 | 1,201 | −5.4% |
| 1900 | 1,179 | −1.8% |
| 1910 | 1,197 | +1.5% |

| Year | Pop. | ±% |
|---|---|---|
| 1921 | 1,202 | +0.4% |
| 1930 | 1,084 | −9.8% |
| 1950 | 882 | −18.6% |
| 1961 | 828 | −6.1% |
| 1970 | 746 | −9.9% |

| Year | Pop. | ±% |
|---|---|---|
| 1980 | 825 | +10.6% |
| 1991 | 760 | −7.9% |
| 2001 | 719 | −5.4% |
| 2011 | 824 | +14.6% |
| 2021 | 774 | −6.1% |

Source: Censuses

== Transport ==
The train station Záhoří in the village of Svatonice is located on the railway line Písek–Tábor.

== Sights ==
In Horní Záhoří is the Church of Saint Michael. The first mention of the church is from 1351, but it was destroyed during the Thirty Years' War and completely rebuilt in 1639. Modifications were made in the 18th and 19th centuries.
