= Man of the World 2026 =

8th Man of the World male beauty competition

- Date: June 6, 2026
- Presenters: Yen Supan
- Venue: Palacio de Maynila, Manila, Philippines
- Broadcaster: Avietho Digital
- Entrants: 28
- Placements: 18
- Debuts: Asian Community of Saudi Arabia
- Withdrawals: Cuba; South Korea; Venezuela; Zimbabwe
- Returns: Angola; Belgium; Cambodia; Chile; Colombia; Dominican Republic; Indonesia; Netherlands; Peru; Sri Lanka
- Winner: Oliver Eugen Kretz; Philippines
- Congeniality: Camilo Andrés Leal (Colombia); Denny Howman (Indonesia)
- Best National Costume: José Mario Rodríguez (Costa Rica)
- Photogenic: Fidel Arellano (Chile)

Man of the World 2026 was the 8th edition of the Man of the World competition, held at the Palacio de Maynila in Manila, Philippines, on June 6, 2026.

Juul Missiaen of Spain crowned Oliver Eugen Kretz of the Philippines as Man of the World 2026. Kretz made history as the first Filipino to win Man of the World.

== Results ==
=== Placements ===
Placement	Contestant	Ref
Man of the World 2026	Philippines – Oliver Eugen Kretz	
1st Runner-Up	Ecuador – Abel Adrian Díaz	
2nd Runner-Up	Chile – Fidel Arellano	
3rd Runner-Up	Mexico – Luis Arturo Jauregui	
4th Runner-Up	Malaysia – Afiq Naufal	
Top 10	Indonesia – Denny Howman; Peru – Estefano Balarín; Puerto Rico – Kelvin López ★; Spain – Ivan Songel Gutierrez; Vietnam – Lôi Viễn Quang	
Top 18	Angola – Simão Filho; Colombia – Camilo Andrés Leal; Costa Rica – José Mario Rodríguez; Czech Republic – Tomáš Ondráček; Dominican Republic – Zachary Pichardo; Myanmar – William Shane; Sri Lanka – Sanjula Keshan; Taiwan – Liu Chi	

★ – Advanced into the Top 10 after winning the fan vote

=== Special Awards ===
Categories	Medalists	Finalists	Ref
Best in National Costume	(gold) Costa Rica – José Mario Rodríguez; (silver) Indonesia – Denny Howman; (silver) Vietnam – Lôi Viễn Quang; (bronze) Panama - Saul Samudio	Dominican Republic – Zachary Pichardo; Ecuador - Abel Adrian Díaz; Mexico – Luis Arturo Jauregui; Myanmar - William Shane; Philippines – Oliver Eugen Kretz; Sri Lanka - Sanjula Keshan	
Best in Formal Wear	(gold) Ecuador - Abel Adrian Díaz; (silver) Sri Lanka - Sanjula Keshan; (bronze) Taiwan - Liu Chi	Angola - Simão Filho; Chile - Fidel Arellano; Costa Rica – José Mario Rodríguez; India - Moha Kiran; Mexico – Luis Arturo Jauregui; Peru - Estefano Balarín; Philippines – Oliver Eugen Kretz	
Best in Swimwear	(gold) Philippines – Oliver Eugen Kretz; (silver) Ecuador - Abel Adrian Díaz; (bronze) Peru - Estefano Balarín	Chile - Fidel Arellano; Czech Republic - Tomáš Ondráček; Malaysia - Afiq Naufal; Mexico – Luis Arturo Jauregui; Nigeria – Victor Eko; Spain – Ivan Songel Gutierrez; Taiwan - Liu Chi; Thailand – Thanongsak Chuaykerd	
Best in Beachwear	(gold) Philippines – Oliver Eugen Kretz; (silver) Spain – Ivan Songel Gutierrez; (bronze) Peru - Estefano Balarín	Czech Republic - Tomáš Ondráček; Ecuador - Abel Adrian Díaz; Malaysia - Afiq Naufal; Mexico – Luis Arturo Jauregui; Puerto Rico - Kelvin López; Sri Lanka - Sanjula Keshan; Vietnam – Lôi Viễn Quang	
Best Physique	(gold) Mexico – Luis Arturo Jauregui; (silver) Dominican Republic – Zachary Pichardo; (bronze) Nigeria – Victor Eko	Angola - Simão Filho; Malaysia - Afiq Naufal; Philippines - Oliver Eugen Kretz; Sri Lanka - Sanjula Keshan; Taiwan - Liu Chi; Thailand – Thanongsak Chuaykerd; Vietnam – Lôi Viễn Quang	
Mister Photogenic	(gold) Chile - Fidel Arellano; (silver) Myanmar - William Shane; (silver) Panama - Saul Samudio; (bronze) Angola - Simão Filho; (bronze) India - Moha Kiran	Belgium - Liam Vlassenbroeck; Costa Rica – José Mario Rodríguez; Czech Republic - Tomáš Ondráček; Sri Lanka - Sanjula Keshan; Taiwan - Liu Chi	
Mister Congeniality	(gold) Colombia – Camilo Andrés Leal; (gold) Indonesia – Denny Howman; (silver) Netherlands - Fransel Meyers; (silver) Spain – Ivan Songel Gutierrez; (bronze) France - Diego Moraes	Angola - Simão Filho; Costa Rica – José Mario Rodríguez; Mexico – Luis Arturo Jauregui; Nigeria – Victor Eko; Philippines – Oliver Eugen Kretz	
Mister Personality	(gold) Puerto Rico – Kelvin López; (silver) Vietnam – Lôi Viễn Quang; (bronze) Cambodia - Phearum Chhin; (bronze) Sri Lanka - Sanjula Keshan	Belgium - Liam Vlassenbroeck; Colombia – Camilo Andrés Leal; Costa Rica – José Mario Rodríguez; India - Moha Kiran; Saudi Arabia – Christian Emmanuel Flores; Thailand – Thanongsak Chuaykerd	
Fashion of the World	(gold) Ecuador - Abel Adrian Díaz; (silver) Malaysia - Afiq Naufal; (silver) Vietnam – Lôi Viễn Quang; (bronze) Mexico – Luis Arturo Jauregui; (bronze) Nepal - Prakash Chauhan	India - Moha Kiran; Peru - Estefano Balarín; Philippines – Oliver Eugen Kretz; Puerto Rico – Kelvin López; Sri Lanka - Sanjula Keshan	
Charity Award	(gold) Costa Rica – José Mario Rodríguez; (silver) Spain – Ivan Songel Gutierrez; (bronze) Mexico – Luis Arturo Jauregui	Czech Republic - Tomáš Ondráček; Indonesia - Denny Howman; Nepal - Prakash Chauhan; Netherlands - Fransel Meyers; Peru - Estefano Balarín; Philippines – Oliver Eugen Kretz; Vietnam – Lôi Viễn Quang	
Best in Arrival Outfit	(gold) Thailand – Thanongsak Chuaykerd; (silver) Indonesia – Denny Howman; (bronze) Chile - Fidel Arellano		
Media’s Choice	(gold) Philippines – Oliver Eugen Kretz; (silver) Chile - Fidel Arellano; (bronze) Malaysia - Afiq Naufal		

=== Medal tally ===
Rank	Country/Territory	Gold (gold)	Silver (silver)	Bronze (bronze)	Total
1	Philippines	3	0	0	3
2	Ecuador	2	1	0	3
3	Costa Rica	2	0	0	2
4	Indonesia	1	2	0	3
5	Chile	1	1	1	3
6	Mexico	1	0	2	3
7	Colombia	1	0	0	1
7	Puerto Rico	1	0	0	1
7	Thailand	1	0	0	1
8	Spain	0	3	0	3
8	Vietnam	0	3	0	3
9	Malaysia	0	1	1	2
9	Panama	0	1	1	2
9	Sri Lanka	0	1	1	2
10	Dominican Republic	0	1	0	1
10	Myanmar	0	1	0	1
10	Netherlands	0	1	0	1
11	Peru	0	0	2	2
12	Angola	0	0	1	1
12	Cambodia	0	0	1	1
12	France	0	0	1	1
12	India	0	0	1	1
12	Nepal	0	0	1	1
12	Nigeria	0	0	1	1
12	Taiwan	0	0	1	1

== Contestants ==
Country/Territory	Contestant	Hometown	Ref.
Angola	Simão Filho	Uíge	
Belgium	Liam Vlassenbroeck	Morkhoven	
Cambodia	Phearum Chhin	Battambang	
Chile	Fidel Arellano	Ñuñoa	
Colombia	Camilo Andrés Leal	Medellín	
Costa Rica	José Mario Rodríguez	Grecia	
Czech Republic	Tomáš Ondráček	Bludov	
Dominican Republic	Zachary Pichardo	Santiago Oeste	
Ecuador	Abel Adrian Díaz	Guayaquil	
France	Diego Moraes	Toulouse	
India	Moha Kiran	Karnataka	
Indonesia	Denny Howman	Jakarta	
Malaysia	Afiq Naufal	Penang	
Mexico	Luis Arturo Jauregui	Zacatecas	
Myanmar	William Shane	Tachileik	
Nepal	Prakash Chauhan	Morang	
Netherlands	Fransel Meyers	Rotterdam	
Nigeria	Victor Eko	Edo	
Panama	Saul Samudio	David	
Peru	Estefano Balarín	Lima	
Philippines	Oliver Eugen Kretz	Puerto Princesa	
Puerto Rico	Kelvin López	Guayama	
Saudi Arabia (Asian Community)	Christian Emmanuel Flores	Dammam	
Spain	Ivan Songel Gutierrez	Valencia	
Sri Lanka	Sanjula Keshan	Nugegoda	
Taiwan	Liu Chi	Taoyuan	
Thailand	Thanongsak Chuaykerd	Nakhon Si Thammarat	
Vietnam	Lôi Viễn Quang	Trà Vinh	

== Notes ==
=== Crossover ===
Major competitions

Mister International

- 2024: Ecuador - Abel Adrian Diaz (Top 10)
- 2024: Peru - Estefano Balarin (First Runner-Up)

Mister Supranational

- 2022: Netherlands - Fransel Meyers

Mister Global

- 2022: Netherlands - Fransel Meyers

Minor competitions

Mister Grand International

- 2021: Belgium - Liam Vlassenbroeck
- 2017: Ecuador - Abel Adrian Diaz (Top 15)

Mister Cosmopolitan

- 2024: Indonesia - Denny Howman (Second Runner-Up)
