= Man of the World (pageant) =

International male beauty competition

- Type: International male beauty pageant
- Parent organization: Prime Events Productions Philippines Foundation Inc. (PEPPS)
- Headquarters: San Juan, Philippines
- First edition: 2017; 9 years ago
- Most recent edition: 2026
- Current titleholder: Oliver Eugen Kretz (Philippines)
- President: Carlo Morris Galang
- Slogan: Masculinity with Responsibility
- Language: English
- Website: www.manoftheworld.org

Man of the World is a premier international male beauty pageant and organization that holds the annual Man of the World competition.

Established in 2017, the competition brings forth advocacy and humanitarian causes, and highlights the importance of education, personal growth, and overall career development—encapsulated in its core tenet, "Masculinity with Responsibility."

The pageant, which has recorded over 120 participating countries from over 150 national-level selection competitions since its inception, making it one of the biggest, most participated major international men's beauty contests, was created by Philippine-based multinational conglomerate Prime Events Productions Philippines (PEPPs) Foundation, Inc., which also organizes the annual Misters of Filipinas competition, and specializes in multimedia content production and talent management through its entertainment company PEPPs TV, LLC.

The current Man of the World is Oliver Eugen Kretz of the Philippines, who was crowned on June 6, 2026 by his predecessor, Man of the World 2025 Juul Missiaen of Spain, at the Palacio de Maynila in Manila, Philippines.

== Man of the World crowns ==
The Man of the World competition is notable for crowning its winners, distinguishing it from other male beauty pageants that typically present only sashes and trophies to their titleholders. Since the competition's inception and inaugural edition in 2017, the organization has consistently featured a crown for the winning Man of the World delegate.

=== Inaugural crown (2017) ===
The inaugural crown, used in the 2017 edition, was of a solid sterling metal of silver and platinum, featuring fleur-de-lis, sampaguita, and other monarchical heraldry emblems from the seven continents. Designed by Filipino international jewellery master Manuel Halasan and insured by Axa International, the first Man of the World crown, estimated to be over 3 million Philippine pesos (around 54,000 US dollars), was meant to pay homage to the masculine beauty ideal, and denote the responsibilities that come with leadership.

=== Ginto crown (2018) ===
The Ginto crown, used in 2018, was designed by Manuel Halasan and insured by the M Lhuillier Group of Companies. Ginto (gold in English), valued at over 5 million Philippine pesos (around 90,000 US dollars), still carried adornments of fleur-de-lis, sampaguita, chrysanthemum, peony, and various other flowers and symbols of imperial heraldry from the seven continents of the world. It is an elevation of the inaugural crown, denoting excellence in responsible leadership, the ideal masculine beauty, and celebrating the modern man.

=== George Wittels crown (2019—2024) ===
The Man of the World crown used from 2019 to 2024 was designed and crafted by jewellery artist George Wittels, through the initiative of Richard James White of Realty World Regency in Hercules, California, United States. Made in Venezuela, the crown is worth over a million US dollars. The design consists of a gold and platinum monarchical diadem base, encrusted and adorned with precious stones that include emeralds, sapphires, rubies, diamonds, and golden Philippine south sea pearls, paying homage to the ideal masculine form and beauty, denoting responsible leadership, and "celebrating the endless possibilities of the future".

=== Edwin Uy crown (2025—Present) ===
The current Man of the World crown, used since 2025, is a masterpiece crown by Filipino designer Edwin Uy, commissioned by the PEPPs Foundation and the Man of the World Organization. It is a solid 23-carat gold crown with emeralds, yellow sapphires, and diamonds, set on a sterling white gold base. The crown is valued at US$1.5 million (approximately 84 million Philippine pesos), and insured by luxury jewellery insurance firm Howden International. Three sets of precious stones were selected to convey symbolisms and reflect the principles of the organization—the yellow sapphires, shaped like flames, symbolize the ongoing, dynamic process of learning, intellectual curiosity, and the never-ending pursuit of knowledge—denoting the value of quality and holistic education. The emeralds represent growth and vitality—denoting the value of life. The diamonds represent clarity, purity, and integrity—evoking masculine strength and responsibility. The gold band of the crown with its sterling white gold base and its overall golden luster represent hard-earned achievements, meritorial success, and the nobility of the human spirit.

== Titleholders ==
Edition	Year	Man of the World	Runners-Up				Venue	Entrants
Edition	Year	Man of the World	First	Second	Third	Fourth	Venue	Entrants
1st	2017	Egypt; Mustafa Galal Elezali	Vietnam; Nguyễn Hữu Long	Palestine; Abou Sahyoun Wassim	Not awarded		Pasay City, Philippines	28
2nd	2018	Vietnam; Cao Xuân Tài	Philippines; Clint Karkliñs Peralta	Malta; Bjorn Camilleri	Czech Republic; Ondřej Valenta	Thailand; Natapol Srisam	San Juan City, Philippines	27
3rd	2019	Bulgaria^{[a]} Daniel Georgiev (Dethroned)	South Korea^{[b]} Jin Kyu Kim (Assumed)	Brazil; Jean Fillippe Vitor Silva	Czech Republic; Jakub Jurčák	Philippines; John Paul Ocat	San Juan City, Philippines	30
2020-2021 Cancelled due to COVID-19 pandemic
4th	2022	India; Aditya Khurana	Ukraine; Vladimir Grand	Philippines; Nadim El Zein	Netherlands; Tjardo Vollema	Vietnam; Nguyễn Hữu Anh	Baguio City, Philippines	22
5th	2023	South Korea; Jin Wook Kim	Hong Kong; Henry Wong	Philippines; James Reggie Vidal	Puerto Rico; Robert Alexander Espaillat	Vietnam; Kim Khánh Lâm	Makati City, Philippines	24
6th	2024	Venezuela; Sergio Alejandro Azuaga Piñango	Philippines; Kenneth Vincent Cabungcal	France; Gwen Jegouzo	Puerto Rico; Fernando Ezequiel Padín Rodríguez	Ecuador; Sebastián Mora	Manila, Philippines	23
7th	2025	Spain; Juul Missiaen	Mexico; Israel Sierra	Thailand; Sitthichok Panitloedtewa	Czech Republic; Honza Jiránek	Panama; Sworman Delgado	Quezon City, Philippines	27
8th	2026	Philippines; Oliver Eugen Kretz	Ecuador; Abel Adrian Díaz	Chile; Fidel Arellano	Mexico; Luis Arturo Jauregui	Malaysia; Afiq Naufal	Manila, Philippines	28

=== League Tables ===
==== Country/territory by number of wins ====
Country	Titles	Year
South Korea	2	2019^{[b]}, 2023
Philippines	1	2026
Spain	1	2025
Venezuela	1	2024
India	1	2022
Bulgaria	1	2019^{[a]}
Vietnam	1	2018
Egypt	1	2017

==== Continents by number of wins ====
Continent or region	Titles	Years
Asia	5	2018, 2019^{[b]}, 2022, 2023, 2026
Europe	2	2019^{[a]}, 2025
Americas	1	2024
Africa	1	2017

== Notes ==
^{a} Dethroned, ^{b} Assumed title

^{A} Daniel Georgiev of Bulgaria who was crowned Man of the World 2019 was dethroned by the organization because he declined to sign a requisite exclusive contract with Prime Events Productions Philippines, Inc. (PEPPs), which organizes the pageant and competition. Jin Kyu Kim of South Korea, then first runner-up, was formally crowned as the new Man of the World 2019 on 29 July 2020, taking over Georgiev's previous role and responsibilities.

== See also ==
- Manhunt International
- Mister World
- Mister International
- Mister Supranational
- Mister Global
