= Man of the World 2025 =

International male beauty competition in 2025

- Date: May 31, 2025
- Presenters: Roanna Ruiz; Ryan Tercero
- Venue: SM SkyDome, Quezon City, Philippines
- Broadcaster: Avietho Digital
- Entrants: 27
- Placements: 18
- Debuts: Ghana; Mexico; Panama; Taiwan
- Withdrawals: Cambodia; Cape Verde; Colombia; Dominican Republic; El Salvador; Sri Lanka; Syria; Zimbabwe
- Returns: China; Costa Rica; Guinea; Iran; Nepal; Nigeria; Palestine; Thailand
- Winner: Juul Missiaen; Spain
- Congeniality: Abrahem Altory (Palestine)
- Best National Costume: David Granda (Ecuador)
- Photogenic: Sworman Delgado (Panama)

Man of the World 2025 was the 7th edition of the Man of the World pageant, held at the SkyDome SM North EDSA, Quezon City, Philippines on May 31, 2025.

Sergio Azuaga of Venezuela crowned Juul Missiaen of Spain as his successor at the end of the event.

== Results ==
=== Placements ===
Placement	Contestant
Man of the World 2025	Spain – Juul Missiaen
1st Runner-Up	Mexico – Israel Sierra §
2nd Runner-Up	Thailand – Sittichok Panitloedtewa
3rd Runner-Up	Czech Republic – Honza Jiránek
4th Runner-Up	Panama – Sworman Delgado
Top 10	France – Adriano Cupaioli; Italy – Alessandro Caputo; Malaysia – William Ong; Nepal – Aayush Dulal §; Philippines – RaÉd Al-Źghayer
Top 18	Brazil – Nyander Marçal de Souza; China – Jaden Yu; Costa Rica – Carlos Arroyo; Myanmar – San Thar; Nigeria – Oluwaseun Alabi; Puerto Rico – Emanuel Rivera; Taiwan – Awngrass Yu; Vietnam – Lý Minh Quân

§ Automatic placement

=== Fast Track Events ===
Fast track winners automatically advanced as Semifinalist.

Position	Contestants	Ref
Multimedia Award	Mexico - Israel Sierra	
Fan Vote	Nepal - Aayush Dulal	

=== Special awards ===
Categories	Medalists	Finalists	Ref
Best in National Costume	(gold) Ecuador – David Granda; (silver) Myanmar – San Thar; (bronze) Thailand – Sittichok Panitloedtewa	Costa Rica - Carlos Arroyo; Malaysia - William Ong; Mexico - Israel Sierra; Panama - Sworman Delgado; Philippines - Raéd Al-Zghayér; Venezuela - Marcos Palacios; Vietnam - Lý Minh Quân	
Best in Formal Wear	(gold) France – Adriano Cupaioli; (gold) Panama – Sworman Delgado; (silver) Spain – Juul Missiaen; (bronze) South Korea – Hyeong-Sik Jeon	China - Jaden Sobere Yu; Costa Rica - Carlos Arroyo; Czech Republic - Honza Jiránek; Mexico - Israel Sierra; Philippines - Raéd Al-Zghayér; Thailand – Sittichok Panitloedtewa	
Best in Swimwear	(gold) Mexico - Israel Sierra; (silver) France - Adriano Cupaioli; (bronze) Thailand – Sittichok Panitloedtewa	Italy - Alessandro Caputo; Myanmar – San Thar; Panama - Sworman Delgado; Philippines - Raéd Al-Zghayér; Puerto Rico - Emanuel Rivera; Spain – Juul Missiaen; Venezuela - Marcos Palacios	
Best in Beachwear	(gold) Mexico - Israel Sierra; (silver) Spain – Juul Missiaen; (bronze) France - Adriano Cupaioli; (bronze) Thailand – Sittichok Panitloedtewa	Czech Republic – Honza Jiránek; Malaysia - William Ong; Panama - Sworman Delgado; Philippines - Raéd Al-Zghayér; Puerto Rico - Emanuel Rivera; Venezuela - Marcos Palacios	
Best in Arrival Outfit	(gold) Mexico – Israel Sierra; (silver) Panama – Sworman Delgado; (bronze) Thailand – Sittichok Panitloedtewa	Costa Rica - Carlos Arroyo; Ecuador - David Granda; India - Azhan Memon; Nepal - Aayush Dulal; Philippines - Raéd Al-Zghayér; Venezuela - Marcos Palacios; Vietnam - Lý Minh Quân	
Best Physique	(gold) Nigeria – Oluwaseun Alabi; (silver) Ghana – Zino Isawode; (silver) Vietnam – Lý Minh Quân; (bronze) Venezuela – Marcos Palacios	Czech Republic - Honza Jiránek; France - David Gabriel Granda; Malaysia - William Ong; Panama - Sworman Delgado; Spain - Juul Missiaen; Thailand – Sittichok Panitloedtewa	
Mister Photogenic	(gold) Panama – Sworman Delgado; (silver) Brazil – Nyander Marçal de Souza; (silver) Costa Rica – Carlos Arroyo; (bronze) Taiwan – Awngrass Yu	China - Jaden Sobere Yu; Czech Republic - Honza Jiránek; Ecuador - David Gabriel Granda; Mexico - Israel Sierra; Nepal - Aayush Dulal; South Korea - Hyeong-Sik Jeon	
Mister Congeniality	(gold) Palestine – Abrahem Altory; (silver) China – Jaden Sobere Yu; (silver) Guinea – Mohamed Diallo; (bronze) Ecuador – David Gabriel Granda	Costa Rica - Carlos Arroyo; Ghana - Zino Isawode; Myanmar - San Thar; Singapore - Ronald Maranan; South Korea - Hyeong-Sik Jeon; Vietnam - Lý Minh Quân	
Mister Personality	(gold) Philippines – Raéd Al-Zghayér; (gold) Singapore – Ronald Maranan; (silver) Italy – Alessandro Caputo; (bronze) Nepal – Aayush Dulal	China - Jaden Sobere Yu; Costa Rica - Carlos Arroyo; Iran - Shahram Abbasi; South Korea - Hyeong-Sik Jeon; Mexico - Israel Sierra; Palestine - Abrahem Altory; Thailand - Sittichok Panitloedtewa	
Fashion of the World	(gold) Thailand – Sittichok Panitloedtewa; (silver) Philippines – Raéd Al-Zghayér; (bronze) Czech Republic - Honza Jiránek	Costa Rica - Carlos Arroyo; Ecuador - David Gabriel Granda; Ghana - Zino Isawode; Malaysia - William Ong; Myanmar - San Thar; Panama - Sworman Delgado; Venezuela - Marcos Palacios	
Press Favorite	(gold) Spain – Juul Missiaen; (silver) Philippines – Raéd Al-Zghayér; (bronze) Mexico – Israel Sierra	Brazil - Nyander Marçal de Souza; China - Jaden Sobere Yu; France - Adriano Cupaioli; Malaysia - William Ong; Nigeria - Oluwaseun Alabi; Singapore - Ronald Maranan; Taiwan - Awngrass Yu	
Man of the World Charity Award	(gold) India - Azhan Memon; (silver) Vietnam - Lý Minh Quân; (bronze) Malaysia - William Ong; (bronze) Mexico – Israel Sierra; (bronze) Thailand – Sittichok Panitloedtewa		

=== Medal tally ===
Rank	Country/Territory	Gold (gold)	Silver (silver)	Bronze (bronze)	Total
1	Mexico	3	0	2	5
2	Panama	2	1	0	3
3	Philippines	1	2	0	3
3	Spain	1	2	0	3
4	France	1	1	1	3
5	Thailand	1	0	5	6
6	Ecuador	1	0	1	2
7	India	1	0	0	1
7	Nigeria	1	0	0	1
7	Palestine	1	0	0	1
7	Singapore	1	0	0	1
8	Vietnam	0	2	0	2
9	Brazil	0	1	0	1
9	China	0	1	0	1
9	Costa Rica	0	1	0	1
9	Ghana	0	1	0	1
9	Guinea	0	1	0	1
9	Italy	0	1	0	1
9	Myanmar	0	1	0	1
10	Czech Republic	0	0	1	1
10	South Korea	0	0	1	1
10	Malaysia	0	0	1	1
10	Nepal	0	0	1	1
10	Taiwan	0	0	1	1
10	Venezuela	0	0	1	1

== Contestants ==
Country/Territory	Contestant	Hometown	Ref.
Brazil	Nyander Marçal de Souza	Bahia	
China	Jaden Sobere Yu	Xiamen	
Costa Rica	Carlos Arroyo	San Carlos	
Czech Republic	Honza Jiránek	Mladá Boleslav	
Ecuador	David Gabriel Granda	Loja	
France	Adriano Cupaioli	Roubaix	
Ghana	Zino Isawode	Accra	
Guinea	Mohamed Diallo	Fouta Djallon	
India	Azhan Memon	Indore	
Iran	Shahram Abbasi	Azad	
Italy	Alessandro Caputo	Naples	
Malaysia	William Ong	Putrajaya	
Mexico	Israel Sierra	Mexico City	
Myanmar	San Thar	Pauktaw	
Nepal	Aayush Dulal	Kavre	
Nigeria	Oluwaseun Alabi	Ondo	
Palestine	Abrahem Altory	Jerusalem	
Panama	Sworman Delgado	Panama City	
Philippines	Raéd Al-Zghayér	Cebu City	
Puerto Rico	Emanuel Rivera	Hatillo	
Singapore	Ronald Maranan	Singapore	
South Korea	Hyeong-Sik Jeon	Seoul	
Spain	Juul Missiaen	Málaga	
Taiwan	Awngrass Yu	New Taipei City	
Thailand	Sittichok Panitloedtewa	Bangkok	
Venezuela	Marcos Palacios	Caracas	
Vietnam	Lý Minh Quân	Ho Chi Minh City	

== Notes ==
=== Crossover ===
Major competitions

Mister Supranational

- 2022: Philippines - Raéd Fernandez Al-Zghayér (Top 20)

Mister International

- 2022: Myanmar - San Thar
