= Man of the World 2017 =

International male beauty pageant

- Date: 28 July 2017
- Presenters: Ryan Tercero
- Venue: One Esplanade, Pasay, Metro Manila, Philippines
- Entrants: 28
- Placements: 18
- Withdrawals: Brazil; Canada; Costa Rica; India; Iran; Nigeria; Panama; Poland; United States
- Winner: Mostafa Galal Mohammed Elezali; Egypt
- Congeniality: Abou Sahyoun Wassim (Palestine)
- Best National Costume: Tatsuya Furuyama (Japan)
- Photogenic: Mostafa Galal Mohammed Elezali (Egypt)

Man of the World 2017 was the first edition of the Man of the World competition, held at the One Esplanade in Pasay, Metro Manila, Philippines, on July 28, 2017.

Mostafa Galal Mohammed Elezali of Egypt was crowned at the end of the event.

== Results ==
=== Placements ===
| Placement | Contestant |
|---|---|
| Man of the World 2017 | Egypt – Mostafa Galal Mohammed Elezali |
| 1st Runner-Up | Vietnam – Nguyễn Hữu Long |
| 2nd Runner-Up | Palestine – Abou Sahyoun Wassim |
| Top 5 | Guam – Jake Edward Limtiaco; Moldova – Victor Suiu |
| Top 10 | Australia – James Carne; Colombia – Christian Hernández; Philippines – Christopher Dulagan §; Puerto Rico – Enrique Antonio Santana; Spain – Marc Tarrés |
| Top 18 | Cape Verde – Daniel Jose da Graça §; England – Habib Mohamed Ali §; South Korea – Jung Goo Young; Singapore – Ikhwan Risyadh Nasuha Bin; Sri Lanka – Damith Chandima Bandara Wijayatunga; Syria – Abdullah Srayddin; Thailand – Mooltribut Phiratthaphong; Zambia – John Mwila |

=== Fast track events ===
| Categories | Winners | Ref |
|---|---|---|
| Best in Talent | England – Habib Mohamed Ali | |
| Best in Introduction Video | Cape Verde – Daniel Jose Da Luz Da Graca | |
| People's Choice | Philippines – Christopher Dulagan | |

=== Special awards ===
| Categories | Winners | Ref |
|---|---|---|
| Best in Advocacy | Thailand – Mooltribut Phiratthaphong | |
| Mr. Photogenic | Egypt – Mostafa Galal Mohammed Elezali | |
| Mr. Friendship | Palestine – Abou Sahyoun Wassim | |
| Charity and Public Service Award | Nepal – Shree Ram Chand | |
| Best in Fashion of the World | China – Junjie Huang; Gibraltar – Felix Bothen | |
| Trendsetter Award | Algeria – Ahmed Merdoukh Fahd Mike | |
| Mr. Personality | Afghanistan – Ali Mansour Nawruzi | |
| Best in National Costume | Japan – Tatsuya Furuyama | |
| Best in Formal Wear | Vietnam – Nguyễn Hữu Long | |
| Best in Swimwear | Moldova – Victor Şuiu | |
| Man of Icon Hotel | Palestine – Abou Sahyoun Wassim | |
| Mr. I-Maker | Spain – Marc Tarrés | |
| Mr. Play Do | Spain – Marc Tarrés | |
| Missosology People's Choice | Vietnam – Nguyễn Hữu Long | |

§ Automatic placement in the Top 18

== Contestants ==
| Country | Contestant |
|---|---|
| Afghanistan | Ali Mansour Nawruzi |
| Algeria | Ahmed-Merdoukh Fahd Mike |
| Australia | James Carne |
| Cape Verde | Daniel Jose Da Luz Da Graca |
| China | Junjie Huang |
| Colombia | Christian Hernández |
| Egypt | Mostafa Galal Mohammed Elezali |
| England | Habib Mohamed Ali |
| Estonia | Kaido Matson |
| Gibraltar | Felix Bothén |
| Guam | Jake Edward Limtiaco |
| Indonesia | Ifnu Viqri Al Karani |
| Japan | Tatsuya Furuyama |
| South Korea | Jung Goo Young |
| Malta | Iven Mercieca |
| Moldova | Victor Şuiu |
| Myanmar | Aung Ko Ko |
| Nepal | Shree Ram Chand |
| Palestine | Abou Sahyoun Wassim |
| Philippines | Christopher Dulagan |
| Puerto Rico | Enrique Antonio Santana Pérez |
| Singapore | Ikhwan Risydah Nasuha Bin Sapi'ee |
| Spain | Marc Tarrés |
| Sri Lanka | Damith Chandima Bandara |
| Syria | Abdullah Srayddin |
| Thailand | Mooltribut Phiratthaphong |
| Vietnam | Nguyễn Hữu Long |
| Zambia | John Mwila |

== Notes ==
=== Crossover ===
Major competitions

Manhunt International

- 2016: Thailand – Mooltribut Phiratthaphong (Top 16)

Mister Global

- 2014: Cape Verde - Daniel José Da Luz Da Graça

Mister International

- 2015: Colombia - Christian Hernández
- 2016: Australia - James Carne (Top 16)
- 2016: South Korea - Jung Goo Young

Minor competitions

Men Universe Model

- 2012: Cape Verde - Daniel José Da Luz Da Graça
