= Man of the World 2019 =

3rd Man of the World competition (2019), international male beauty pageant edition

- Date: 11 July 2019
- Presenters: Michael Bristol and Ruben Anthony Timbol
- Venue: Filoil Flying V Centre, San Juan, Philippines
- Entrants: 30
- Placements: 18
- Debuts: Belgium; Bolivia; Bulgaria; Costa Rica; Hong Kong; Lebanon; Liberia; Namibia; Netherlands; South Africa; Sudan
- Withdrawals: Benin; Mongolia; Nigeria; Saudi Arabia; Sri Lanka
- Returns: Spain
- Winner: Jin Kyu Kim, South Korea; (assumed); Daniel Georgiev, Bulgaria; (dethroned)
- Congeniality: Mamadou Bailo Diallo (Guinea); Eisa Hider Alfake (Sudan)
- Best National Costume: Carlos Marquez Saez (Spain)
- Photogenic: Krishna Salak (India)

Man of the World 2019 was the third edition of the Man of the World competition, held at the Filoil Flying V Centre in San Juan, Metro Manila, Philippines, on July 11, 2019.

Cao Xuân Tài of Vietnam crowned Daniel Georgiev of Bulgaria at the end of the event. The first runner-up Jin Kyu Kim of South Korea took over the title on July 29, 2020.

== Results ==
=== Placements ===
Placement	Contestant
Man of the World 2019	Bulgaria – Daniel Georgiev (Dethroned)
1st Runner-Up	South Korea – Jin Kyu Kim (Assumed)
2nd Runner-Up	Brazil – Jean Fillippe Vitor Silva
3rd Runner-Up	Czech Republic – Jakub Jurcak
4th Runner-Up	Philippines – John Paul Ocat §
Top 10	Guinea Bissau – Vensam Lala; India – Krishna Salak; Nepal – Tsering Pakhrin; Netherlands – Lars Kortleven; Spain – Carlos Márquez Saez
Top 18	Bolivia – Tomas Rojas; Ecuador – Matthew Cevallos; Guam – Christian Templo; Hong Kong – Carson Leung; Indonesia – Isaac Agung Budiman; Iran – Max Merafsha; Liberia – T-ylo Johnson; Vietnam – Ta Cong Phat

=== Fast Track Event ===
	Contestants
Online Fan Vote	Philippines – John Paul Ocat

=== Special awards ===
Categories	Winners and Medalists	Ref
Best in Advocacy	Brazil – Jean Fillippe Vitor Silva	
Mr. Photogenic	India Krishna Salak	
Mr. Congeniality	Guinea – Mamadou Bailo Diallo; Sudan – Eisa Hider Alfake	
Mr. Personality	Lebanon – Adel Serhal; Morocco – Elomri Lahoucine	
Fashion of the World	Namibia – Kennedy Amadhila	
Best in Beach Wear	Czech Republic – Jakub Jurcak	
Best in National Costume	(gold) Spain – Carlos Marquez Saez; (silver) Indonesia Isaac Agung Budiman; (bronze) India Krishna Salak; (bronze) Philippines John Paul Ocat	
Best in Formal Wear	Korea – Jin Kyu Kim	
Best in Swimwear	(gold) Bulgaria – Daniel Georgiev; (silver) Czech Republic – Jakub Jurcak; (bronze) Korea – Jin Kyu Kim	
Psalmstre New Placenta Choice	Bulgaria – Daniel Georgiev	
Mr. David's Salon	Bulgaria – Daniel Georgiev	

§ Automatic placement in the Top 18

== Contestants ==
Country	Contestant	References
Belgium	Grigor Sayadyan	
Bolivia	Tomas Rojas	
Brazil	Jean Fillippe Vitor Silva	
Bulgaria	Daniel Georgiev	
Cameroon	Ngonda Sangama André Junior	
China	Yi Ru Le	
Costa Rica	Mauricio Alberto Blanco Espinoza	
Czech Republic	Jakub Jurcak	
Ecuador	Matthew Cevallos	
Guam	Christian Templo	
Guinea	Mamadou Bailo Diallo	
Guinea Bissau	Vensam Lala	
Hong Kong	Carson Leung	
India	Krishna Salak	
Indonesia	Isaac Agung Budiman	
Iran	Max Merafsha	
Lebanon	Adel Serhal	
Liberia	T-ylo Johnson	
Morocco	Elomri Lahoucine	
Myanmar	Soe Khit	
Namibia	Kennedy Amadhila	
Nepal	Tsering Pakhrin	
Netherlands	Lars Kortleven	
Philippines	John Paul Ocat	
South Africa	Jaden Durell Ash	
South Korea	Jin Kyu Kim	
Spain	Carlos Márquez Saez	
Sudan	Eisa Hider Alfake	
Thailand	Sapol Suporn	
Vietnam	Tạ Công Phát	

== Controversies ==
Prime Events Productions Philippines (PEPPS), Inc., which organizes the pageant, let go of Georgiev for failure to fulfill his duties as winner, declining to sign an exclusive contract with PEPPS and rejecting projects and appearances relevant to his role as Man of the World titleholder. First runner-up Jin Kyu Kim of South Korea took over the title on July 29, 2020.

== Notes ==
=== Crossover ===
Mister Universal Ambassador

- 2017: Spain - Carlos Márquez Saez
