= Man of the World 2018 =

2nd Man of the World competition (2018), international male beauty pageant edition

- Date: 14 July 2018
- Presenters: Ganiel Krishnan and Michael Bristol
- Venue: Filoil Flying V Centre, San Juan, Philippines
- Entrants: 27
- Placements: 17
- Debuts: Brazil; Cameroon; Czech Republic; Ecuador; Ethiopia; India; Iran; Italy; Malaysia; Mongolia; Nigeria; Peru
- Withdrawals: Algeria; Colombia; Cuba; Guinea; Lebanon; Macedonia; Mexico; Morocco; United States
- Winner: Cao Xuân Tài; Vietnam
- Congeniality: Clint Karkliñs Peralta (Philippines)
- Best National Costume: Clint Karkliñs Peralta (Philippines)
- Photogenic: Kbrom Gebremeskel Gesese (Ethiopia)

Man of the World 2018 was the second edition of the Man of the World competition, held at the Filoil Flying V Centre in San Juan, Metro Manila, Philippines, on July 14, 2018.

Mostafa Galal Mohammed Elezali of Egypt crowned Cao Xuân Tài of Vietnam as his successor at the end of the event.

== Results ==
=== Placements ===
Placement	Contestant
Man of the World 2018	Vietnam – Cao Xuân Tài
1st Runner-Up	Philippines – Clint Karkliñs Peralta §
2nd Runner-Up	Malta – Bjorn Camilleri
3rd Runner-Up	Czech Republic – Ondrej Valenta
4th Runner-Up	Thailand – Natapol Srisarn
Top 10	China – Li Ruitao; Indonesia – Wrendy Agil Rifansar; Myanmar – Kaung Htet Wai; Peru – Juan Carlos Cabrera; South Korea – Gil Hwan Kim
Top 17	Guam – Joseph Lawrence Bondoc; India – Joshua Roshan Chhabra; Iran – Max Mehrafsha §; Italy – Mark Anthony Cruz; Monaco – Erdenetsogt Siilegma; Nigeria – Emmanuel Luiz Okafor; Puerto Rico – Lennie Figueroa

=== Fast Track Events ===
Categories	Winners and Medalists	Ref
Best in Talent	(gold) Iran – Max Mehrafsha; (silver) Myanmar – Kaung Htet Wai; (bronze) India – Joshua Roshan Chhabra	
World's Choice Award	Philippines – Clint Karkliñs Peralta	

=== Special awards ===
Categories	Winners and Medalists	Ref
Best in Advocacy	(gold) Myanmar – Kaung Htet Wai; (silver) Philippines – Clint Karkliñs Peralta; (bronze) Brazil - Eduardo Gabriel Possamai	
Best in Fashion of the World	(gold) India – Joshua Chhabra; (silver) Philippines – Clint Karkliñs Peralta; (silver) Myanmar – Kaung Htet Wai; (bronze) Italy – Mark Anthony Cruz; (bronze) Puerto Rico – Lennie Figueroa	
Mr. Photogenic	Ethiopia – Kbrom Gebremeskel Gesese	
Mr. Congeniality	Philippines – Clint Karkliñs Peralta	
Mr. Personality	Singapore – Ali Mansour Nawruzi	
Best in Resort Wear	(gold) Czech Republic – Ondrej Valenta; (silver) South Korea – Gil Hwan Kim; (bronze) Egypt - Ahmed Mohamed Abdallah Madkour	
Best in National Costume	(gold) Philippines – Clint Karkliñs Peralta; (silver) Indonesia - Wrendy Agil Rifansar; (bronze) Thailand - Natapol Srisarn	
Best in Formal Wear	(gold) Thailand – Natapol Srisarn; (silver) Peru – Juan Carlos Cabrera Torres; (bronze) Malta – Bjorn Camilleri	
Best in Swimwear	(gold) Mongolia – Erdenetsogt Siilegma; (silver) Vietnam – Cao Xuân Tài; (bronze) Cameroon - Nick Kevin Parker Biapa	
Best in Casual Wear	(gold) Vietnam – Cao Xuân Tài; (silver) Indonesia - Wrendy Agil Rifansar; (bronze) Mongolia – Erdenetsogt Siilegma	
Mr. Highland Bali Resort & Spa	Philippines – Clint Karkliñs Peralta	
Darlings of the Press	Myanmar – Kaung Htet Wai; Nigeria – Emmanuel Luiz Okafor; Peru – Juan Carlos Cabrera Torres; Philippines – Clint Karkliñs Peralta; Vietnam – Cao Xuân Tài	

§ Automatic placement in the Top 17

== Contestants ==
Country/Terr.	Contestant	Ref.
Brazil	Eduardo Gabriel Possamai	
Cameroon	Nick Kevin Parker Biapa	
China	Li Ruitao	
Czech Republic	Ondrej Valenta	
Ecuador	Wiler Jair Choez Loor	
Egypt	Ahmed Mohamed Abdallah Madkour	
Ethiopia	Kbrom Gebremeskel Gesese	
Guam	Joseph Lawrence Bondoc	
India	Joshua Roshan Chhabra	
Indonesia	Wrendy Agil Rifansar	
Iran	Max Mehrafsha	
Italy	Mark Anthony Cruz	
Malaysia	Fitri Razali	
Malta	Bjorn Camilleri	
Mongolia	Erdenetsogt Siilegma	
Myanmar	Kaung Htet Wai	
Nepal	Chandan Bishowkarma	
Nigeria	Emmanuel Luiz Okafor	
Palestine	Majed Abumazyad	
Peru	Juan Carlos Cabrera Torres	
Philippines	Clint Karkliñs Peralta	
Puerto Rico	Lennie Figueroa	
Singapore	Yamin Yusof	
South Korea	Gil Hwan Kim	
Sri Lanka	Anuradha Stefan Upekshaka Methsiri	
Thailand	Natapol Srisarn	
Vietnam	Cao Xuân Tài	

== Notes ==
=== Crossover ===
Mister Global

- 2016: Ecuador - Wiler Jair Choez Loor

Mister United Continents

- 2017: Palestine - Majed Abumazyad

Mister Universe Tourism

- 2018: Palestine - Majed Abumazyad
