= Mister Global 2026 =

12th edition of the Mister Global competition

- Date: 10 October 2026
- Venue: MCC Hall, The Mall Lifestore Ngamwongwan, Nonthaburi, Thailand
- Entrants: 39
- Placements: 20
- Debuts: Ghana; Hmong (Note: Non-national delegate competing as the Hmong people); Italy; Kenya; Mauritius; United States Virgin Islands
- Withdrawals: El Salvador; Germany; Hong Kong; Paraguay; Peru; Poland; Singapore; Uruguay
- Returns: Malaysia; Nepal; Netherlands; Portugal; Vietnam
- Winner: Dilhan Divrikli; Turkey
- Congeniality: Myron Jude Ordillano; Philippines
- Best National Costume: Reuben Adom; Ghana

Mister Global 2026 was the 12th Mister Global pageant, held at the MCC Hall, The Mall Lifestore Ngamwongwan in Nonthaburi, Thailand, on 10 October 2026.

Alejandro Ortega of Spain crowned Dilhan Divrikli of Turkey as his successor at the end of the event, marking the first Turkish contestant to win the title.

== Background ==
=== Location and date ===
The 12th edition was held in Thailand from 29 September to 10 October 2026. Organized by TPN Global alongside Miss Global 2026, it shared several activities with the women’s competition for the first time. The delegates arrived in Bangkok on 29 September and attended the official welcome and sash ceremony on 30 September. From 1 to 5 October, they traveled to Nakhon Pathom, which served as a co-host city, before the final was held on 10 October at MCC Hall, The Mall Lifestore Ngamwongwan in Nonthaburi.

=== Selection of participants ===
The license holder in Kosovo has paid the franchise fee but did not send a representative to compete in this edition.

==== Replacements ====
Rowan Skye Musick, Mister America Global 2025, was replaced by his runner-up Alijah Johnson due to force majeure. Remonde Laroy Levy was replaced by Aaron Lynn Lloyd for undisclosed reasons. Kelechi Amonu-Jones withdrew due to academic and family commitments and was replaced by Bethel Mbamara, Mister International Nigeria 2025.

==== Debuts, returns and withdrawals ====
This edition marked the debuts of the Collectivity of Ghana, Hmong, Italy, Kenya, Mauritius, and the United States Virgin Islands.

Returning countries for this edition include Portugal, which last competed in 2019; Netherlands in 2022; Nepal in 2023; and Malaysia and Vietnam in 2024.

Airton Vargas of Peru was stripped of his title for alleged misconduct.

== Results ==
=== Placements ===
Placement	Contestant
Mister Global 2026	Turkey – Dilhan Divrikli
1st Runner-Up	Nigeria – Bethel Mbamara
2nd Runner-Up	Philippines – Myron Jude Ordillano
3rd Runner-Up	Hmong – Anthony Zaj Moua ‡ ☆
4th Runner-Up	Venezuela – Alejandro Quintero
Top 11	Brazil – Yago Cavalcante; Dominican Republic – Bray Vargas; Mexico – Alexander Cardona; Myanmar – Htet Wai Aung; Netherlands – Anthony Henricus; Spain – Abel Villamor Díaz
Top 20	Canada – Jay Stokes; Colombia – Kevin Gonzalez; France – Bizien Maxime; Japan – Dan Reynolds; Nepal – Girish Ratna Shakya; Portugal – Joan Carlos Figueira; Puerto Rico – Armando Cordero; South Korea – Jeong-chan Lee; United States – Alijah Johnson

‡ – Voted into the Top 11 by viewers and awarded as Mister Popularity
☆ – Voted into the Top 20 by viewers and awarded as The Brotherhood Gateway

=== Special Awards ===
Award	Contestant
Nakhon Pathom Golden Charm	Hmong – Anthony Zaj Moua
Mister Popularity	Hmong – Anthony Zaj Moua
Brotherhood Gateway	Hmong – Anthony Zaj Moua
Mister Congeniality	Philippines – Myron Jude Ordillano
Best National Costume	Ghana – Reuben Adom
Best Video Introduction	Nepal – Girish Ratna Shakya
Best Physique	Myanmar – Htet Wai Aung
Mister Photogenic	Italy – Umberto Chianese
Media Choice Award	Turkey – Dilhan Divrikli
Leadership Award	Dominican Republic – Bray Vargas
V Square Clinic Global Icon	Philippines – Myron Jude Ordillano
Social Impact	Mauritius – Kamlesh Singh Shadhu
Ambassador	Thailand – Rachan Rungpraipana

== Contestants ==
Thirty-nine delegates competed for the title.

Country/Territory	Contestant	Age (Note: Ages at the time of the pageant)	Hometown	Ref.
Brazil	Yago Cavalcante	30	Caruaru	
Canada	Jay Stokes	36	Toronto	
China	William Liu	34	Guangdong	
Colombia	Kevin Gonzalez	29	Medellín	
Cuba	Juan Carlos Milian	31	Villa Clara	
Dominican Republic	Bray Vargas	35	Santiago	
Ecuador	Erik Tovar	25	Playas	
England	Alex Major	24	Manchester	
France	Bizien Maxime	25	Strasbourg	
Ghana	Reuben Adom	28	Accra	
Hmong	Anthony Moua	26	Minneapolis	
India	Harshit Solanki	27	Indore	
Indonesia	Reno Ferdinand	21	Central Java	
Italy	Umberto Chianese	25	Naples	
Japan	Dan Reynolds	29	Tokyo	
Kenya	Harmaton Sila	26	Nairobi	
Laos	Phanpasit Philavanh	31	Vientiane	
Malaysia	Asyraf Hisham	37	Kuala Lumpur	
Mauritius	Kamlesh Singh Shadhu	35	Vacoas-Phoenix	
Mexico	Alexander Cardona	28	Guadalajara	
Myanmar	Htet Wai Aung	27	Yangon	
Nepal	Girish Ratna Shakya	29	Lalitpur	
Netherlands	Anthony Henricus	23	Amsterdam	
Nigeria	Bethel Mbamara	25	Port Harcourt	
Panama	David Robles	28	Panama City	
Philippines	Myron Jude Ordillano	29	Parañaque	
Portugal	Joan Carlos Figueira	37	Lisbon	
Puerto Rico	Armando Cordero	27	San Juan	
South Africa	Marnus Botha	32	Somerset West	
South Korea	Jeong-chan Lee	30	Seoul	
Spain	Abel Villamor Díaz	19	Logroño	
Sri Lanka	Yulan Drew	25	Colombo	
Thailand	Rachan Rungpraipana	22	Chiang Mai	
Togo	Tete Gafan	21	Lomé	
Turkey	Dilhan Divrikli	21	Emirdağ	
United States	Alijah Johnson	29	Chesapeake	
United States Virgin Islands	Aaron Lynn Lloyd	41	Saint Thomas	
Venezuela	Alejandro Quintero	31	Santa Cruz de Mora	
Vietnam	Trương Trọng Hiếu	25	Lâm Đồng	
