= Mister Global 2025 =

- Date: 5 October 2025
- Presenters: Piyawat Kempetch; Daumier Corilla; Nguyễn Đình Như Vân; Saffron Maya Snook; Vanessa Nattacha Wenk
- Venue: MCC Hall, The Mall Lifestore Bangkae, Bangkok, Thailand
- Entrants: 36
- Placements: 20
- Debuts: Uruguay
- Withdrawals: Cambodia; Croatia; Malaysia; Pakistan; Sierra Leone; Taiwan; Vietnam
- Returns: Canada; Colombia; El Salvador; Germany; Japan; Macau; Myanmar; Paraguay; Peru; Poland; United States
- Winner: Alejandro Ortega; Spain
- Congeniality: Siwathep Khanderpor, Canada
- Best National Costume: Youphalat Phethany, Laos

Mister Global 2025 was the 11st Mister Global pageant, held at the MCC Hall, The Mall Lifestore Bangkae in Bangkok, Thailand, on 5 October 2025.

Daumier Corilla of the Philippines crowned Alejandro Ortega of Spain as his successor at the conclusion of the event. This marks Spain's second title, following their first win in 2021.

Contestants from thirty-six countries and territories competed in this year’s pageant. The final was hosted by Piyawat Kempetch, while Mister Global 2024, Daumier Corilla, and Miss Global 2025, Nguyễn Đình Như Vân, served as hosts for the preliminary competition. Miss Global Thailand 2026, Saffron Maya Snook, and Miss Intercontinental Thailand 2025, Vanessa Wenk, served as backstage hosts.

== Background ==
=== Location and date ===
On 4 October 2025, the Mister Global 2025 competition began with the preliminary and national costume competitions at MCC Hall, The Mall Lifestore Bangkae in Bangkok, Thailand. The final competition was held at the same venue on 5 October 2025, marking the 11th edition of the Mister Global pageant.

=== Debuts, returns and withdrawals ===
This edition marked the debut of Uruguay. Returning countries for this edition include Paraguay, which last competed in 2016; Germany in 2018; Colombia, Japan, Peru, Poland, and the United States in 2022; and Canada, El Salvador, Macau, and Myanmar in 2023.

Đoàn Công Vinh participated in the competition but withdrew after being hospitalized.

== Results ==
=== Placements ===
Placement	Contestant
Mister Global 2025	Spain – Miguel Alejandro Ortega
1st Runner-Up	Venezuela – William Badell
2nd Runner-Up	Mexico – Gabriel Alejandro Silva
3rd Runner-Up	United States – Riley Hedstrom
4th Runner-Up	France – Adriano Cupaioli
Top 11	China – Tian Xiang Zhao; Laos – Youphalat Phethany; Nigeria – Victor Ngoka §; Philippines – Jether Palomo; South Korea – Eric Kang; Uruguay – Bruno Romero
Top 20	Brazil – Lucas Laet; Canada – Siwathep Khanderpor; Hong Kong – Xiao Ting Liu ☆; Myanmar – Di Yan; Peru – Luigi Moron; Puerto Rico – Edrick Morillo; South Africa – Charl van Helsdingen; Sri Lanka – Shenal Adithya; Thailand – Sitthirak Kaewniyom

§ – Voted into the Top 11 by viewers and awarded as Mister Popularity.
☆ – Voted into the Top 20 by viewers and awarded as The Brotherhood Gateway.

=== Special awards ===
Award	Contestant
Best Country Presentation Video	Philippines – Jether Palomo
Best National Costume	Laos – Youphalat Phethany
Mister Congeniality	Canada – Siwathep Khanderpor
Mister Popularity	Nigeria – Victor Ngoka
Shine on my MYNDS	Spain – Alejandro Ortega
The Brotherhood Gateway	Hong Kong – Xiaoting Liu

== Contestants ==
Thirty-six contestants competed for the title.

Country/Territory	Contestant	Age (Note: Ages at the time of the pageant)	Hometown
Brazil	Lucas Laet	32	Rio de Janeiro
Canada	Siwathep Khanderpor	32	Toronto
China	Tianxiang Zhao	23	Shandong
Colombia	Sebastián Velandia	31	Santiago de Cali
Cuba	Daviel Ruiz	26	Caibarién
Dominican Republic	Yilbert Mejía	21	Jarabacoa
Ecuador	Ivan Andres Morejon	27	Quito
El Salvador	Arturo Alfaro	31	Kannapolis
England	Usman Janjua	25	Birmingham
France	Adriano Cupaioli	21	Roubaix
Germany	Marc Arthur Tsanang	35	Wiesbaden
Hong Kong	Xiaoting Liu	25	Chengdu
India	Rakesh Bhosekar	32	Mumbai
Indonesia	Arrie Octrian	34	Bogor
Japan	Takumi Ozawa	32	Yokkaichi
Laos	Youphalat Phethany	32	Pakse
Macau	Peixi Guo	36	Yangchun
Mexico	Gabriel Alejandro Silva	23	Colima
Myanmar	Di Yan	23	Yangon
Nigeria	Victor Ngoka	22	Lagos
Panama	Frank Méndez	31	Mérida
Paraguay	Agustín Mergarejo	26	Quiíndy
Peru	Luigi Moron	23	Lima
Philippines	Jether Palomo	23	Taguig
Poland	Adam Wyszyński	32	Zielona Góra
Puerto Rico	Edrick Morillo	25	Trujillo Alto
Singapore	William Archery	28	Singapore
South Africa	Charl-Jaquairdo van Helsdingen	34	Krugersdorp
South Korea	Eric Kang	28	Los Angeles
Spain	Alejandro Ortega	26	La Vall d'Uixó
Sri Lanka	Shenal Adithya	23	Ambalangoda
Thailand	Sitthirak Kaewniyom	22	San Kamphaeng
Turkey	Tan Kırkyıldız	19	Istanbul
United States	Riley Hedstrom	29	Blaine
Uruguay	Bruno Romero	31	Punta del Este
Venezuela	William Badell	29	Maracaibo
