= Mister Dominican Republic =

National male beauty pageant competition in the Dominican Republic

- Formation: 2000
- Type: Male pageant
- Headquarters: Santo Domingo
- Location: Dominican Republic
- Members: Manhunt International; Mister International; Mister Supranational; Mister Global; Man of the World
- Official language: Spanish

Mister Dominican Republic (Spanish: Mister República Dominicana) is a pageant where men ranging from the ages of 18 to 30 compete, each representing their country to the male international pageants.

== Organization ==
Mister Dominican Republic is the official platform for the most important male pageants of the planet:Manhunt International, Mister International, Mister Global and Mister Supranational. Also part of the semi-finalist will be representing the Dominican Republic in some other Male pageants around the world. The Mister Dominican Republic Pageant is led by Anthony Santana, MDR 2012. The current titleholder is Christian Román Puigbó of Punta Cana who was crowned on 21 May 2019 at the Auditorio Patrick N. Hughson Dominico Americano in Santo Domingo.

== Mister Dominican Republic Representatives ==
=== Manhunt Dominican Republic International ===
- : Winner
- : Runner-up
- : Finalist or Semifinalist
- : Special Award Winner

Year	Mister Dominican Republic	Placement	Special Awards
1995	Hector Peralta	Unplaced	
2006	Elisio Cortes	Unplaced	
2008	Jetson Rodríguez	Unplaced	
2011	Nelson Sterling	1st Runner-up	
2012	Joel Pérez Núñez	Top 16	
2016	Digno Guerrero	Top 16	Best Model Americas
2017	Mike Jacobi	Top 16	
2018	Roosevelt Casado	Unplaced	
2020	Argenis Grullón	Unplaced	
2022	Manuel Arias	Unplaced	
2024	Starlyn Terrero	Top 20	
2025	Frangel Santiago	Unplaced	

=== Mister Dominican Republic International ===
- : Winner
- : Runner-up
- : Finalist or Semifinalist
- : Special Award Winner

Year	Mister Dominican Republic	Placement	Special Awards
2012	Anthony Santana	Unplaced	
2013	Jonathan Checo	Unplaced	
2014	Giusseppe Paulino	Withdrew	
2015	Freds Rivera	Unplaced	
2016	Victor Matos	Withdrew	
2017	Kenny Rodríguez	Unplaced	
2018	Arturo Paredes	Top 10	
Due to the impact of COVID-19 pandemic, no competition held between 2019―2021
2022	Enmanuel "Manu" Franco	Mister International 2022	Best in Formal Wear
2023	Ovarlyn Torres	Top 20	
2024	Felipe Reyes	Unplaced	
2025	Aldo Farias	Top 20	

=== Mister Dominican Republic Supranational ===
- : Winner
- : Runner-up
- : Finalist or Semifinalist
- : Special Award Winner

Year	Mister Dominican Republic	Placement	Special Awards
2018	Daniel Sicheneder	Top 10	Mr Supranational Caribbean
2019	Ángel Enrique Holguín	Top 10	Mr Supranational Caribbean
2021	Iván Oleaga Gómez	Top 10	Mr Supranational Caribbean
2022	Lewis Echavarria	Top 20	
2023	Jan Carlos Carrasco	Withdrew	
2024	Braylin “Bray” Vargas	Top 10	Mr Supranational Caribbean
2025	Stanley Castellanos	Unplaced	
2026	Ramón Alcántara	3rd Runner-up	

=== Mister Dominican Republic Global ===
- : Winner
- : Runner-up
- : Finalist or Semifinalist
- : Special Award Winner

Year	Mister Dominican Republic	Placement	Special Awards
2018	Frainy Figueroa	Top 16	
2019	Braulio Encarnación	4th Runner-up	
2021	Ariel Morales	Unplaced	Best Body
2022	Michael Gómez	Unplaced	
2023	Alexander Taveras	Top 10	
2024	Kenneth Castillo	Unplaced	
2025	Yilbert Mejía	Unplaced	
2026	Braylin “Bray” Vargas	Top 11	
2027	Steven Mejía		

=== Man of the World Dominican Republic ===
- : Winner
- : Runner-up
- : Finalist or Semifinalist
- : Special Award Winner

Year	Mister Dominican Republic	Placement	Special Awards
2022	Kenneth Castillo	Top 15	(gold) Mister Personality
2023	Rikaury Mieses	Unplaced	(gold) Best in Arrival Outfit
2024	Junior Mendoza	Top 15	
2025	Robinson Disla	Withdrew	
2026	Zachary Pichardo		

=== Caballero Universal Dominican Republic ===
- : Winner
- : Runner-up
- : Finalist or Semifinalist
- : Special Award Winner

Year	Mister Dominican Republic	Placement	Special Awards
2021	Enmanuel Peña	1st Runner-up	
2022	Fabio Ovalles	Top 10	Best Smile
2023	Leandro Mendoza	Caballero Universal 2023	Mister Interactive
2024	Osvaldo Abud	Unplaced	
2025	Oscar Del Rosario	Unplaced	

== Mister World ==
Mister World Dominican Republic
- Formation: 2007
- Type: Male Pageant
- Headquarters: Santo Domingo
- Location: Dominican Republic
- Members: Mister World
- Official language: Spanish

Mister World Dominican Republic is a pageant that was made 2007. Since that year Mister Dominican Republic World collaborates with Reina Nacional de Belleza (Miss Mundo Dominicana) together. Dominican Republic has participated at the Mister World since 1996.

- : Winner
- : Runner-up
- : Finalist or Semifinalist
- : Special Award Winner

Year	Mister World Dominican Republic	Placement	Special Awards
1996	Juan Vidal Gil		
2007	Johaney Albor Linero		
2010	Ramón Alberto Uyola		
2014	Braylin “Bray” Vargas		
2019	Alejandro Rafael Martínez	Top 5 (3rd)	Mister World Caribbean
2024	Julio Peña Hernández		

== Batch of Mister Dominican Republic ==
The titleholders that will represent the Dominican Republic at the most important male beauty pageants are:

Dominican Republic Titleholders
Mister Dominican Republic International	Mister World Dominican Republic	Mister Supranational Dominican Republic	Mister Global Dominican Republic	Caballero Universal Dominican Republic	Manhunt International Dominican Republic	Man of the World Dominican Republic
Ovarlyn Torres	Julio Peña	Jan Carrasco	Alexander Taveras	Leandro Mendoza	Argenis Grullón	Kenneth Castillo

== Men Universe Model ==
Men DR Universe Model
- Formation: 2008–2019
- Type: Male Pageant
- Headquarters: Santo Domingo
- Location: Dominican Republic
- Members: Men Universe Model
- Official language: Spanish
- President: Robert Flores
- Staff: Pierre Dulanto

Men Dominican Republic Universe Model is a model pageant to select its winner to the Men Universe Model. The pageant previously named Mister Universe Model then renamed Men Universe Model since 2013. Mister República Dominicana Universe Model collaborates MEN UNIVERSE MODEL Company to hold one of the most prestigious male international pageant in the world in the Dominican Republic. This pageant leads by Robert Flores.

On 12 July 2012 Erick Jiménez Sabater announced as the first Men Universe Model 2012 from the Dominican Republic. He overcame Miha Dragos of Slovenia during the final two at 5th annual Men Universe Model pageant.

- : Winner
- : Runner-up
- : Finalist or Semifinalist
- : Special Award Winner

Year	Mister Dominican Republic	Placement	Special Awards
2008	Anderson Mendoza	Top 10	
2009	Fabio Reyes		
2010	Ostwal González	Top 15	
2011	Anthony Duarte	1st Runner-up	
2012	Erick Jiménez Sabater	Men Universe Model 2012	Best Body
2013	Walter Pineda		
2014	Alejandro Ortiz		
2015	Lawrence Maria		
2016	Victor Alcantara Carpio	2nd Runner-up	
2017	Ariel Sánchez Calderón	Top 15	Best Body
2018	Eddison Tineo	Top 12	
2019	Christopher Galván	Top 15	

== Mister Tourism World ==
Mister Tourism World Dominican Republic
- Formation: 2018
- Type: Male Pageant
- Headquarters: Santo Domingo
- Location: Dominican Republic
- Members: Mister Tourism World
- Official language: Spanish

Mister Tourism World Dominican Republic is a contest organized by the actor, social communicator and event producer, Osiris Richetti, Mister Tourism World Dominican Republic 2018, who selects the top representative of beauty, tourism and culture for the Dominican Republic in Mister Tourism World (Mister Tourism World). The Dominican Republic has participated since 2018.

- : Winner
- : Runner-up
- : Finalist or Semifinalist
- : Special Award Winner

Year	Mister Dominican Republic	Placement	Special Awards
2018	Osiris Richetti	2nd Runner-up	
2019	Rafael Columna	2nd Runner-up	Mister Culture
2021	Jonathan Checo	Mister Tourism World 2021	Best in Swimsuit
2022	Iván Pimentel	3rd Runner-up	Best Body
2023	Byron Balbuena	2nd Runner-up	
2024	Jorge Valenzuela	4th Runner-up	

== See also ==
- Miss Dominican Republic
