= Mr Model México 2024 =

12th edition of Mr Model México

- Date: July 20, 2026
- Presenters: Carlos Girón
- Venue: La Maraka, Benito Juárez, Mexico City
- Broadcaster: YouTube
- Entrants: 30
- Placements: 6
- Winner: Brian Faugier; Nuevo León
- Photogenic: Fernando Loera; Jalisco

Mr Model México 2024 is the 12th edition of the Mr Model México pageant, held on July 20, 2024, in La Maraka, Benito Juárez, Mexico City. The Mr Model México 2023 winners subsequently passed on their titles to their respective successors at the end of the event.

The competition is slated to select Mexico's representatives to various international male pageants, including Mister International, Mister Global, and Caballero Universal.

== Results ==
=== Placements ===
Color keys

- Declared as winner
- Ended as runner-up or top 5/6 qualification
- Ended as one of the finalists or semifinalists
- Ended did not place

=== Mr Model México 2024 ===
Placement	Delegate	International Placement
Mister International Mexico 2024	Nuevo León – Brian Faugier	Top 10 – Mister International 2024
Mister Global Mexico 2024	Ciudad de México – Bryan Vázquez	Top 10 – Mister Global 2024
Caballero Universal Mexico 2024	Puebla – Stefano Filipponi	Top 13 – Caballero Universal 2024
Top 6	Baja California Sur – Luis Preciado; Jalisco – Fernando Loera; Sonora – Carlos Traviña	

== Official Delegates ==
30 delegates competed for the title.

State	Candidate	Age	Height
Aguascalientes	David Hans Martínez	25	1.85 m (6 ft 1 in)
Baja California	David Ruiz Romero	27	1.87 m (6 ft 1 1/2 in)
Baja California Sur	Luis Fernando Preciado	22	1.80 m (5 ft 11 in)
Campeche	José Carlos Álvarez	33	1.78 m (5 ft 10 in)
Ciudad de México	Bryan Vázquez Holguín	24	1.90 m (6 ft 3 in)
Coahuila	Jorge Eduardo Flores	24	1.80 m (5 ft 11 in)
Colima	Jorge Alexander Alcaraz	26	1.80 m (5 ft 11 in)
Chiapas	Victor García	32	1.88 m (6 ft 2 in)
Chihuahua	Jesús Roberto Corral	24	1.84 m (6 ft 1/2 in)
Durango	Mauricio Hernández Linden	20	1.84 m (6 ft 1/2 in)
Estado de México	Iván Ruíz Yanajara	33	1.80 m (5 ft 11 in)
Guanajuato	Esteban Figueroa Mendoza	18	1.80 m (5 ft 11 in)
Guerrero	Edgar Romero	28	1.80 m (5 ft 11 in)
Hidalgo	José Jaciel Ávila	33	1.85 m (6 ft 1 in)
Jalisco	Fernando Loera Martínez	24	1.85 m (6 ft 1 in)
Morelos	Carlos Geovanny Velasco	27	1.80 m (5 ft 11 in)
Michoacán	Eduardo Bedolla	24	1.80 m (5 ft 11 in)
Nayarit	Jesús Eloi Esparza	27	1.92 m (6 ft 3 1/2 in)
Nuevo León	Brian Arturo Faugier González	30	1.90 m (6 ft 3 in)
Puebla	Stefano Filipponi Cordoba	23	1.84 m (6 ft 1/2 in)
Querétaro	Armando Castillo Ruanova	30	1.80 m (5 ft 11 in)
Quintana Roo	Ricardo González	33	1.87 m (6 ft 1 1/2 in)
San Luis Potosí	Hernán Hernández	24	1.83 m (6 ft 0 in)
Sinaloa	Erick Maldonado	24	1.80 m (5 ft 11 in)
Sonora	Carlos Efraín Traviña	22	1.82 m (5 ft 11 1/2 in)
Tamaulipas	Homero Adiel Ferretiz	30	1.80 m (5 ft 11 in)
Tlaxcala	Roberto Árevalo Toledo	25	1.78 m (5 ft 10 in)
Veracruz	Omar Becerra	31	1.78 m (5 ft 10 in)
Yucatán	Victor Hugo Cortés	26	1.83 m (6 ft 0 in)
Zacatecas	Alexis Muñoz Granados	26	1.80 m (5 ft 11 in)
