= Mister Ecuador =

National male beauty pageant in Ecuador

- Formation: 1990; 36 years ago
- Founder: César Montecé
- Type: Male Beauty pageant
- Headquarters: Guayaquil
- Location: Ecuador
- Members: Mister International; Mister Supranational; Mister Global; Man of the World
- Official language: Spanish

Mister Ecuador is an annual national male beauty pageant based in Guayaquil, that selects Ecuador's representatives to international competitions.

The national organization was founded in 1990 by Cesar Montece. The contest was then inactive until 1996–2000, Javier Cassis Phillips from Quito won the first modern title of Mister Ecuador

Representatives from the 24 provinces that make up Ecuador compete annually for the title of Mister Ecuador. Since 2025, Mister Ecuador has sent its winner to Mister International and Mister Supranational. In addition, the pageant also selects candidates to represent Ecuador in other international contests such as Mister Global and Man of the World.

== International placement ==
The following titleholders have represented Ecuador in international male beauty pageants.

Color Key

- : Declared the Winner
- : Finished as a runner-up or top 5/6 qualification
- : Finished as one of the finalists or semifinalists

| Year | Mister Ecuador | Representation | International | Venue |
|---|---|---|---|---|
| 1995 | Hugo Guerrero | Guayaquil, Guayas | 2nd. runner-up Mr. Joven Internacional | Puerto Rico |
| 2001 | Javier Cassis Phillips | Quito, Pichincha | 1st Runner-up Mr. Tourism International | Panama |
| 2002 | Tonny Desamblanc | Quito, Pichincha | Top 10 at Mr. Tourism International | Panama |
| 2002 | Julio César Cabrera | Guayaquil, Guayas | 1st Runner-up International Male Model | Aruba |
| 2005 | Hugo Lino Bellitini | — | Mr. Model Universe | Ecuador |
| 2007 | Jose Miguel Mancero | Guayaquil, Guayas | Mr. Turismo Intercontinental | Dominican Republic |
| 2007 | Mario Fernando Pérez | Babahoyo, Los Ríos | Mr. Tourism Universe | Ecuador |
| 2008 | Gino Rivera | Guayaquil, Guayas | Top 10 at Men Universe Model | Dominican Republic |
| 2008 | Maximiliano Metz | Guayaquil, Guayas | Mr. Continentes del Mundo | Peru |
| 2009 | Rodrigo Moreira | Milagro, Guayas | Mr. America Latina | Peru |
| 2012 | Jaime Sánchez | Chone, Manabí | Top 12 at Men Universe Model | Dominican Republic |
| 2014 | Maximiliano Metz | Guayaquil, Guayas | Top 10 at Mr. Model International | Dominican Republic |
| 2017 | Matthew Cevallos | Manabí, Manta | Top 17 at Man of the World | Philippines |
| 2017 | Nixon Gabriel Burgos | Colimes, Guayas | Mr. Golden Universe | Peru |
| 2018 | Eli Nicolás López | Guayaquil, Guayas | Mr. United Continents | Philippines |
| 2019 | Christhian Pesántez | Cuenca, Azuay | Mr. Golden Universe | Peru |
| 2019 | Nicolás Esteban Asanza | Quito, Pichincha | Top 10 at Mr. Supranational | Poland |
| 2019 | Christhian Pesántez | Cuenca, Azuay | Rey Dorado Universo | Bolivia |
| 2021 | José Gabriel Moreno | Guayaquil, Guayas | Top 10 at Mr. Grand International | Panama |
| 2021 | Andrés Puas | Guayaquil, Guayas | Rey Dorado Universo | Bolivia |
| 2021 | Fabricio Caicedo | Guayaquil, Guayas | Top 17 at Mister Global | Thailand |
| 2023 | Bruno Barbieri Roggiero | Guayaquil, Guayas | Top 10 at Mr. Supranational | Poland |
| 2023 | Bruno Barbieri Roggiero | Guayaquil, Guayas | Top 10 at Mr. Global | Thailand |
| 2024 | Sebastian Mora | Guayaquil, Guayas | 4th Runner-up at Man of the World | Philippines |
| 2024 | Abel Adrian Díaz Arias | Guayaquil, Guayas | Top 10 at Mister International | Thailand |
| 2026 | Abel Adrian Díaz Arias | Guayaquil, Guayas | 1st Runner-up at Man of the World | Philippines |

== Representatives of Mister Ecuador ==
=== Mister International ===
| Year | Province | Hometown | Delegate | Placement | Special Award(s) |
|---|---|---|---|---|---|
| 2026 | Pichincha | Quito | Nicolás Esteban Asanza | TBD | |
| 2025 | Pichincha | Quito | Cristian Proaño | Unplaced | |
| 2024 | Guayas | Guayaquil | Abel Adrian Díaz Arias | Top 10 | |

=== Mister Supranational ===
| Year | Province | Hometown | Delegate | Placement | Special Award(s) |
|---|---|---|---|---|---|
| 2026 | Pichincha | Quito | Sebastián Jaramillo | Unplaced | |
| 2025 | Imbabura | Ibarra | Andrey Soliz | Unplaced | |
| 2024 | Guayas | Guayaquil | Fernando Mendieta | Unplaced | |
| 2023 | Guayas | Guayaquil | Bruno Barbieri Roggiero | Top 10 (8th Place) | Mister Fitness |
| 2022 | Manabí | Portoviejo | Alberto Arroyo | Unplaced | |
| 2021 | Imbabura | Otavalo | Mario Iglesias | Unplaced | |
| 2019 | Pichincha | Quito | Nicolás Esteban Asanza | Top 10 (8th Place) | Mister Supranational Americas |

=== Man of the World ===
| Year | Province | Hometown | Delegate | Placement | Special Award(s) |
|---|---|---|---|---|---|
| 2026 | Guayas | Guayaquil | Abel Adrian Díaz Arias | 1st Runner-up | (gold) Best in Formal Wear; (gold) Fashion of the World; (silver) Best in Swimwear |
| 2025 | Loja | Loja | David Gabriel Granda | Unplaced | (gold) Best in National Costume; (bronze) Mister Congeniality |
| 2024 | Guayas | Guayaquil | Sebastián Mora | 4th Runner-up | (gold) Mister Congeniality; (silver) Press Favorite; (bronze) Best in National Costume; (bronze) Best in Beachwear |

=== Mister Global ===
| Year | Province | Hometown | Delegate | Placement | Special Award(s) |
|---|---|---|---|---|---|
| 2025 | Tungurahua | Ambato | Iván Andrés Morejón | Unplaced | |
| 2024 | Pichincha | Quito | Steeven Bravo | Unplaced | |
| 2023 | Guayas | Quito | Bruno Barbieri Roggiero | Top 10 | Sexy Body |
| 2021 | Guayas | Guayaquil | Fabricio Caicedo | Top 17 | |

== See also ==
- Miss Ecuador
- Miss World Ecuador
