= Vladimir Grand =

Ukrainian social media influencer

Vladimir Grand (Ukrainian: Володимир Гранд) is a Ukrainian model and social media influencer based in the Philippines. He is also known as the apprentice of Filipino professional boxer Manny Pacquiao.

== Biography ==
Grand was born in Kyiv, Ukraine, and graduated from the Faculty of Law at a Ukrainian University. He represented Ukraine in the Man of the World 2022 international pageant contest, where he secured the title of first runner-up, after losing to India's Aditya Khurana.

Currently, Grand is in a relationship with his Filipina girlfriend, Jenelyn Eugene.

== Filmography ==
=== Television ===
| Year | Title | Role | Notes |
|---|---|---|---|
| 2022 | Mano po Legacy: The Flower Sisters | Greg | 3 episodes |
