= Christopher Bramell =

English model and actor

- Born: Christopher Bramell; 24 May 1993 (age 33); Liverpool, England
- Education: BA Honours Sports Development and Science
- Occupations: Model, Actor
- Beauty pageant titleholder
- Title: Mr Liverpool 2015; Mr England 2015
- Major competitions: Mr Liverpool 2015 (Winner); Mr England 2015 (Winner); Mister World 2016 (Top 5); Manhunt International 2016 (2nd Runner-up); Mister Global 2017 (2nd Runner-up)
- Website: http://www.christopherbramell.com/

Christopher Bramell (born 24 May 1993) is an English model, actor and the winner of Mr England 2015 / 2016. He represented England at Mister World 2016 and came 4th place out of 46 entrants.

== Early life and career ==
Bramell was born in Liverpool on 24 May 1993. He graduated from Edge Hill University with a BA Honours Sports Development and Science degree. He worked at a local Aldi supermarket while launching his modelling and acting career.

His modelling career was launched when he was spotted by the Mr Liverpool pageant organiser while working as a checkout assistant. He then went on to win the Mr England 2015/ 2016 competition against already established models. Bramell also works as an actor and continued to work his full-time job at the local supermarket while competing. He represented England at the Mister World 2016 pageant held in Southport, England on 19 July 2016 and was among the Top 5 finalists coming in at 4th place.

Bramell was the overall winner of the sports challenge giving him fast track to the top 5 of the competition. Bramell also won sub-awards while at Mister World including the Golf Challenge, 1st runner up in the Southport Pier Challenge and member of the winning team for the extreme sports group rounds.

Bramell placed 4th in the competition above any other contestant competing from the United Kingdom or Europe.

During his time as Mr England Bramell has done a lot of work for charity. One of his greatest achievements was organising a charity catwalk featuring amputees, children with cancer and women with breast cancer in order to help them build back up their self-esteem. Bramell has also done a lot of work in his local community including working with the Merseyside Society for Deaf People and delivering over 100 Easter eggs to homeless shelters in Liverpool and to the children's ward at Whiston Hospital. Bramell continues to support charities close to his heart as well as being an Ambassador for Beauty with a Purpose, a global humanitarian charity which helps underprivileged children around the globe.

Bramell's TV work includes appearing in Channel 4's Hollyoaks, ITV's Emmerdale and Britain's Got More Talent.

Bramell was chosen to represent England in Manhunt International 2016 and placed 3rd out of 50 other contestants.

On 21 May 2017, Bramell represented England at the Mister Global 2017 held in Chiang Mai, Thailand and was awarded the title of 2nd Runner-up.
