= Rubaru Mister India =

Indian national men's beauty pageant

Rubaru Mr. India
- Formation: 2004
- Type: Beauty Pageant
- Headquarters: Mumbai
- Location: India
- Members: Mister International; Mister Global; Manhunt International; Mister Model Worldwide; Mister Tourism World; Mister National Universe; Mister Friendship International; Caballero Universal; Mister Model International; Mister Pacific Universe; Mister Heritage International; Mister Glam International; Mister Planet Universe
- Official language: Hindi, English
- Managing Director: Pankaj Kharbanda
- President: Sandeep Kumar
- Parent organisation: Rubaru Talent Promoting Group
- Website: rubarugroup.in/rubaru-group-mr-india-audition

Mr India or Rubaru Mr. India is a national beauty pageant for men in India. The pageant was created by Rubaru Group in the year 2004. It is responsible for sending India's representatives to international pageants – Caballero Universal, Mister Global, Mister Model International, Mister Model Worldwide, Mister Grand International, Mister Tourism World, Mister International, Mister National Universe, Mister Friendship International, Mister Pacific Universe and Mister Fashion Model. The pageant is India's longest-running national male competition and presently holds the title for the largest national male pageant globally. It was founded by the president of Rubaru Group, Sandeep Kumar in the Indian state of Haryana, and Pankaj Kharbanda is the vice president of the pageant.

== History ==
Rubaru Mr. India pageant was created in 2004, however it started sending India's representatives to international pageants from 2014. Pratik Virk became the first Rubaru Mr. India winner to go to an international pageant. He represented India at Mister Model International 2014 competition held in Dominican Republic and was adjudged fourth runner-up. The following years, Rubaru Mr. India pageant acquired franchise rights of other international pageants in India. In 2016, Prateek Baid represented India at Mister Global 2016 contest held in Thailand and won Best Model award.

== International victories and achievements ==
The Rubaru Mr. India organization has produced 4 international pageant winners and several runners-up. In 2016, Mohit Singh became the first Rubaru Mr. India titleholder to win an international competition. He won the title of Mister United Continents 2016 in the Philippines. The following year, in 2017, Dr. Pankaj Ahlawat became the first candidate to the win the Mister National Universe title in Thailand. In 2019, Ashwani Neeraj travelled to Brazil as India's representative to the Mister Grand International competition. He later became the first Asian candidate to win the Mister Grand International title. In 2023, Rubaru Mr. India winner, Neil Aryan Thakur from Bihar created history by becoming the first Asian candidate to the Mister Pacific Universe title in Peru. In the same year, Jason Dylan Bretfelean secured the title of Mister Global 2023 in Thailand, making history as the first Indian to achieve this prestigious honor. In addition to this, Rubaru Mr. India has produced multiple international runners-up.

== Rubaru Mister India titleholders ==
Color keys

- A year wherein the India earned a crown(s)
- A year wherein the India placed as a runner-up(s)
- A year wherein the India placed in the top 5, top 10, top 15, or as a semifinalist(s)

Year	Winners	Runners-Up	Ref.
2025	Rubaru Mr. India International; Madhuram Daga Rubaru Mr. India Global; Rakesh Bhosekar Rubaru Mr. India Manhunt International; Nipun Singh Rubaru Mr. India Caballero Universal; Anantha Krishna R Rubaru Mr. India Friendship International; Sonish Hinduja Rubaru Mr. India Glam International; Manjoy Bhattacharya Rubaru Mr. India Tourism World; Abhinav Anil Ballary Rubaru Mr. India National Universe; Gokul Sahu	Rubaru Mr. India Brand Ambassador; Madhuram Daga	
2024	Rubaru Mr. India International; Vishnu Chaudhary Rubaru Mr. India Global; Gemin Darin Rubaru Mr. India Manhunt International; Jomin D'souza Rubaru Mr. India Caballero Universal; Adithya Subramanian Rubaru Mr. India Friendship International; Gaurish Singh Rubaru Mr. India Model International; Abhishek Yadav Rubaru Mr. India Tourism World; Mushthaqh Mohammad Rubaru Mr. India National Universe; Sagar Shah Rubaru Mr. India Heritage International; Harsh Rathod Rubaru Mr. India Glam International; Viraj Babbar	Rubaru Mr. India Brand Ambassador; Manoj Kumar Rubaru Mr. India North; Dhanesh Gupta Rubaru Mr. India East; Rahul Mandal Rubaru Mr. India West; Saurabh Prabhudessai Rubaru Mr. India South; Yokesh Arul	
2023	Rubaru Mr. India International; Shashwat Dwivedi. Rubaru Mr. India Global; Jason Dylan Bretfelean Rubaru Mr. India Caballero Universal; Anish Jain Rubaru Mr. India Tourism World; Mukesh Ravi Rubaru Mr. India National Universe; Tachang Phassang Rubaru Mr. India Heritage International; Sukhbir Ashat Rubaru Mr. India Grand International; Tushar Kapoor Rubaru Mr. India Universe International; Badal Bist Rubaru Mr. India Glam International; Vyasan A. Rubaru Mr. India Friendship International; Daksh Chaudhary Rubaru Mr. India Model International; Reshab Chetri Rubaru Mr. India Asia-Pacific; Abhishek Mane	Rubaru Mr. India Brand Ambassador; Lummi Shangchiri Rubaru Mr. India North; Rupendra Swarnkar Rubaru Mr. India East; Aryman Raj Rubaru Mr. India West; Chetan Jajani Rubaru Mr. India South; Siddhartha Gunti Rubaru Mr. India North East; Revan Pradhan	
2022	Rubaru Mr. India Global; Chena Ram Choudhary Rubaru Mr. India Model International; Gokul Ganesan Rubaru Mr. India Grand International; Kunzang Topgay Bhutia Rubaru Mr. India Universal; Kramik Yadav Rubaru Mr. India Tourism World; Mithun Debbarma Rubaru Mr. India Worldwide; Neil Aryan Rubaru Mr. India Intercontinental; M Sai Sri Harsha Rubaru Mr. India National Universe; Biswajit Roy Rubaru Mr. India Asia Pacific; Shubham Kotharkar Rubaru Mr. India Youth Icon; Banner Lanamai James	Rubaru Mr. India Brand Ambassador; Tinkesh Kaushik; Vineet Sharma Rubaru Mr. India North 𝖦undeep 𝖲ingh Rubaru Mr. India East; Bimersh Rasaily Rubaru Mr. India West; Nehal Patil Rubaru Mr. India South; Loganand Rubaru Mr. India North East; Minjom Padu	
2020–21	Rubaru Mr. India Global; Tseteej Shiwakoty Rubaru Mr. India Intercontinental; Bharat Bhushan Rubaru Mr. India Tourism World; Shouryaditya Singh Rubaru Mr. India Worldwide; Ankit Sharma Rubaru Mr. India Grand International; Paras Arora Rubaru Mr. India United Continents; Songashim Rungsung Rubaru Mr. India Model International; Armaan Hakim Rubaru Mr. India Asia Pacific; Gopinath Ravi Rubaru Mr. India Universal; Sangarsh Shet Verenka	Rubaru Mr. India Brand Ambassador; Tumken Sora; Gulfam Ahmed	
2019	Rubaru Mr India Global; Rishabh Chaudhary Rubaru Mr. Indian Model Worldwide; Yogesh Sharma Rubaru Mr. India National Universe; Sahil Arora Rubaru Mr. India Tourism World; Lakshya Singh Rubaru Mr. India Star Universe; Sagar Amale		
2018	Rubaru Mr. India International; Balaji Murugadoss Rubaru Mr. India Mister Eco International; Ashwani Neeraj Rubaru Mr. India Mister Model International; Dalton D'Souza Rubaru Mr. India Mister National Universe; Farhan Qureshi Rubaru Mr. India Mister United Continents; Pradeep Kharera Rubaru Mr. India Mister Tourism World; Zulfi Aziz SK	1st runner-up Dilip Patel 2nd runner-up Kamlesh Solanki 3rd runner-up Gaurav Sharma	
2017	Rubaru Mr. India International; Darasing Khurana Rubaru Mr. India Global; Srikant Dwivedi Rubaru Mr. India Universal Ambassador; Rohit Jakhar Rubaru Mr. India Model International; Mohit Sharma Rubaru Mister United Continent India; Mitendra Singh Rubaru Mr. India Tourism World; Kunal Arora Rubaru Mr. India National Universe; Dr. Pankaj Ahalwat Rubaru Mr. India Grand International; Debojit Bhattacharya Rubaru Mr. India Top International Model; Rohit Choudhary		
2016	Rubaru Mr. India International; Mudit Malhotra Rubaru Mr. India Global; Prateek Baid Rubaru Mr. India United Continents; Mohit Singh Rubaru Mr. India Model International; Anurag Fageriya Rubaru Mr. India Universal Ambassador; Parmeet Wahi Rubaru Mr India Tourism World; Sanju Ray Rubaru Mr India Man of the year Abhishek Shah		
2015	Rubaru Mr. India Model International; Phany Padaraju Rubaru Mr. India Global; Sandeep Sehrawat Rubaru Mr. India Worldwide; Sandeep Chhikara Rubaru Mr. India Universal Ambassador; Jagjeet Singh Rubaru Mr. India United Continents; Dheeraj Sharma Rubaru Mr. India Pancontinental; Ashish Malhan		
2014	Rubaru Mr. India; Pratik Virk		

== Representatives to major beauty pageants ==
Color key

- Declared as Winner
- Ended as Runner-up
- Ended as one of the Finalists or Semi-finalists
- Ended as special awards winner

=== Mister International ===
- Rubaru Mr. India organization acquired the franchise rights of Mister International in 2016. From 2006 to 2010 independent candidates represented India at the Mister International competition. From 2012 to 2015, Alempokba Imsong from Nagaland held the franchise. In 2022, Mega Mister Northeast sent India's delegate to Mister International.

Year	Delegate	State / Territory	Placement	Special Awards
2026	Aaryan Chawla	Daman and Diu	TBA	
2025	Madhuram Daga	West Bengal	Top 20	
2024	Vishnu Choudhary	Rajasthan	Unplaced	
2023	Shashwat Dwivedi	Uttar Pradesh	Top 5	Smart Guy
2022	Lukanand Kshetrimayum	Manipur	1st Runner-up	
2018	Balaji Murugadoss	Tamil Nadu	unplaced	
2017	Darasing Khurana	Maharashtra	Unplaced	
2016	Mudit Malhotra	New Delhi	Top 9	
2015	Halley Laithangbam	Manipur	Unplaced	1 Special Award: Top 10 – Best National Costume
2014	Parmeet Wahi	New Delhi	Unplaced	
2013	Hukapa Chakhesang	Nagaland	Unplaced	
2012	Opangtongdang Jamir	Nagaland	Unplaced	
2010	Akash Charan	Rajasthan	Unplaced	
2009	Imran Khan	New Delhi	Unplaced	
2008	Vikas Mehandroo	New Delhi	Top 15	
2007	Nikhil Dharwan	New Delhi	Top 10	
2006	Sudhir Tewari	New Delhi	Unplaced	

=== Mister Global ===
Year	Delegate	State / Territory	Placement	Special Award
2026	Harshit Solanki	Uttar Pradesh	TBA	
2025	Rakesh Bhosekar	Maharashtra	Unplaced	
2024	Gemin Darin	Arunachal Pradesh	Top 20	
2023	Jason Dylan Bretfelean	Telangana	Mister Global 2023	Mister Body Perfect
2022	Chena Ram Choudhary	Rajasthan	Top 15	Highest Scorer in Preliminary Segment
2021	Tseteej Shiwakoty	Sikkim	Top 17	Most Inspirational Person – Wi
2019	Rishabh Chaudhary	New Delhi	Unplaced	
2017	Srikant Dwivedi	Uttar Pradesh	Top 10	
2016	Prateek Baid	Rajasthan	Top 15	Best Model
2015	Sandeep Sehrawat	Maharashtra	Unplaced	

=== Manhunt International ===
Year	Delegate	State / Territory	Placement	Special Awards
2027	Pradhaan Raghava	Tamil Nadu	TBA	
2026	Nipun Singh	Madhya Pradesh	1st Runner-Up	
2025	Jomin D'Souza	Maharashtra	Unplaced	

=== Caballero Universal ===
Year	Delegate	State / Territory	Placement	Special Awards
2026	Hasit Parikh	Maharashtra	TBA	
2025	Anantha Krishna	Kerala	2nd Runner-up	Mister Interactive
2024	Adithya Subramanian	Tamil Nadu	2nd Runner-up	
2023	Badal Bist	Karnataka	Top 15	Mister Congeniality
2022	Kramik Yadav	Gujarat	2nd Runner-up	Mister Elegance

=== Mister Friendship International ===
Year	Delegate	State / Territory	Placement	Special Awards
2025	Biswajit Roy (Assumed)	West Bengal	Unplaced	
2025	Sonish Hinduja (Resigned)	New Delhi	Did not compete	
2024	Saurabh Pradbhudessai (Assumed)	Goa	Unplaced	
2024	Gaurish Singh (Resigned)	Assam	Did not compete	
2023	Daksh Chaudhary	New Delhi	3rd Runner-up	Mister Popular
2022	Songashim Rungsung	Manipur	2nd Runner-up	Best Personality

- In 2024, Gaurish Singh from Assam was supposed to compete at Mister Friendship International, however he had to withdraw due to leg injury. He was replaced by Rubaru Mr. West India 2024, Saurabh Prabhudessai from Goa.

=== Mister Model International ===
Year	Delegate	State / Territory	Placement	Special Awards
2025	Abhishek Yadav	Maharashtra	TBA	
2024	Reshab Chetri	Manipur	Did not compete	
2023	No pageant in 2023			
2022	Gokul Ganesan	Tamil Nadu	No pageant held in 2022	
2021	Armaan Hakim	Maharashtra	3rd Runner-up	Best Internet Model – Winner; Best Headshot – Top 3
2019	Aditya Bhadoria	New Delhi	Unplaced	
2018	Mohit Sharma	Karnataka	Unplaced	Best Model Asia Pacific
2016	Anurag Fageriya	Rajasthan	Top 16	
2015	Phany Padaraju	Maharashtra	1st Runner-up	
2014	Pratik Virk	Punjab	4th Runner-up	

=== Mister Tourism World ===
Year	Delegate	State / Territory	Placement	Special Awards
2026	Abhinav Anil Ballary	Telangana	TBA	
2025	Sriloganand Kumar (Assumed)	Tamil Nadu	Top 10	Best in Fashion & Style; Best Runway Model (1st runner-up)
2025	Mushthaqh M (Resigned)	Tamil Nadu	Did not compete due to health issues	
2024	No Mister Tourism World pageant held in 2024			
2023	Mukesh Ravi	Tamil Nadu	Did not compete	
2022	Mithun Debbarma	Tripura	Top 17	
2021	Shouryaditya Singh	Jharkhand	2nd Runner-up	Mister Popularity – Winner; Best Speaker – Runner-up
2020	Lakshya Singh	Madhya Pradesh	Unplaced	
2019	No Mister Tourism World pageant held in 2019			
2018	Zulfi Shaikh	Assam	Did not compete	
2017	Kunal Arora	New Delhi	Unplaced	
2016	Sanju Ray	Assam	Unplaced	

- In 2025, Mushthaqh M was supposed to represent India at Mister Tourism World competition, however he had to withdraw due to poor health. He was replaced by the former Rubaru Mr. South India 2022 titleholder, Sriloganand Kumar.

=== Mister National Universe ===
Year	Delegate	State / Territory	Placement	Special Awards
2025	Gokul Sahu	Uttar Pradesh	5th Runner-Up	Mister National Universe Global Ambassador
2024	Tachang Phassang	Arunachal Pradesh	Unplaced	Mister Flawless Skin
2023	Biswajit Roy	West Bengal	Unplaced	
2022	Bharat Bhushan	New Delhi	3rd Runner-Up	Mister National Earth
2019	Vikash Usham	Manipur	Mister National Universe 2019	
2019	Sahil Arora	Gujarat	Unplaced	
2018	Farhan Qureshi	Madhya Pradesh	Top 5	
2017	Pankaj Ahalwat	New Delhi	Mister National Universe 2017	People's Choice Award; So Cool Guy

Note - 2 editions of Mister National universe were held in 2019

=== Mister Pacific Universe ===
Year	Delegate	State / Territory	Placement	Special Awards
2024	Vineet Sharma	Madhya Pradesh	1st Runner-up (Mister Model Pacific Universe 2024)	Mister Top Model
2023	Neil Aryan Thakur	Bihar	Mister Pacific Universe 2023	Mister Fitness

=== Mister Heritage International ===
Year	Delegate	State / Territory	Placement	Special Awards
2024	Sukhbir Ashat	Maharashtra	Mister Heritage International 2024	
2023	Banner Lanamai James	Manipur	1st Runner-up	Best in Runway; Best in Resort Wear; Best in Formal Wear; Mister Elegance

=== Mister Glam International ===
Year	Delegate	State / Territory	Placement	Special Awards
2025	Manjoy Bhattacharya	Madhya Pradesh	Top-10	Best in Camera Presence; Mister Glam Tourism
2024	Viraj Babbar	Madhya Pradesh	1st Runner-up	Mister Popular
2023	Vyasan A Nair	Kerala	3rd Runner-up	Mister Popular; Mister Super Model; Pageantry King

=== Mister Planet Universe ===
Year	Delegate	State / Territory	Placement	Special Awards
2023	Abhishek Mane	Mumbai	2nd Runner-up	Mister Planet Asia 2023; Best Typical Costume; Mister Planet Copper World

=== Mister Grand International ===
Year	Delegate	State / Territory	Placement	Special Awards
2023	Tushar Kapoor	Jammu and Kashmir	Did not compete	
2022	Nehal Patil	Goa	Top 18	
2019	Ashwani Neeraj	New Delhi	Mister Grand International 2019	Best National Costume
2017	Debojit Bhattacharya	Assam	Unplaced	

=== Mister Landscapes International ===
Year	Delegate	State / Territory	Placement	Special Awards
2019	Dilip Patel	Maharashtra	Unplaced	

=== Mister Model Worldwide ===
Year	Delegate	State / Territory	Placement	Special Awards
2019	Yogesh Sharma	Rajasthan	Unplaced	Mister Model Worldwide Asia; Best Runway Model
2018	Suraj Dahiya	New Delhi	2nd Runner-up	Mister Perfect Body – Winner; Best National Costume – 2nd Runner-up

=== The Mister ===
Year	Delegate	State / Territory	Placement	Special Awards
2019	Mohit Sharma	Karnataka	Top 10	

=== Mister United Continents ===
Year	Delegate	State / Territory	Placement	Special Awards
2018	Pardeep Kharera	Haryana	Unplaced	Best in Swimwear – Finalist
2017	Mitendra Singh	Madhya Pradesh	1st Runner-up	Mister Photogenic; Mister Online Popularity
2016	Mohit Singh	Haryana	Mister United Continents 2016	Mister Online Popularity
2015	Dheeraj Sharma	Haryana	4th Runner-up	Best in Barong

=== Mister Universal Ambassador ===
Year	Delegate	State / Territory	Placement	Special Awards
2017	Rohit Jakhar	Haryana	4th Runner-up	Top Model; People's Choice Award; World Speech Competition; Mister Universal Ambassador Asia and Oceania
2016	Parmeet Wahi	New Delhi	Unplaced	
2015	Jagjeet Singh	Punjab, India	3rd Runner-up	Best in Swimwear

=== Top International Model of the World ===
Year	Delegate	State / Territory	Placement	Special Awards
2017	Rohit Choudhary	New Delhi	2nd Runner-up	Best Catwalk Model

=== Man of the Year ===
Year	Delegate	State / Territory	Placement	Special Awards
2016	Abhishek Shah	New Delhi	Finalist	Mister Manl

=== Mister Worldwide ===
Year	Delegate	State / Territory	Placement	Special Awards
2015	Sandeep Chhikara	New Delhi	2nd Runner-up	

=== Mister Pancontinental ===
Year	Delegate	State / Territory	Placement	Special Awards
2015	Ashish Malhan	New Delhi	2nd Runner-up	

== See also ==
- Prateek Baid
- Gopinath Ravi
