= Prateek Baid =

Indian model

- Born: Prateek Baid; 15 September 1991 (age 35); Bikaner, Rajasthan, India
- Education: MIT Bikaner
- Occupations: Engineer, model and actor
- Modeling information
- Height: 6 ft 3 in (1.91 m)
- Hair color: Brown
- Eye color: Hazel

Prateek Baid (born 15 September 1991) is an Indian model, actor, automobile engineer and beauty pageant titleholder based in Bikaner, Rajasthan. He won Rubaru Mr. India 2016 and represented India at Mister Global 2016 held in Chiang Mai, Thailand, where he placed in the Top 15 semi-finalists, and won the "Best Model" award.

== Biography ==
Prateek Baid was born on 15 September 1991 in Bikaner, Rajasthan. He went to Central Academy Bikaner School. He graduated with a degree in mechanical engineering from Manda institute of technology College Bikaner. He won the Glam Icon 2015 held on 22 November 2015 at Kurla, Mumbai organized by Phoenix Market City Mumbai.

He made his television debut with Maharakshak: Devi aired on Zee TV. Later in 2016 he won Rubaru Mr. India 2016 contest held on 24 April 2016 at Anya Hotel in Gurugram (previously Gurgaon) and represented India at Mister Global 2016 contest held at Central Plaza in Chiang Mai, Thailand and won the Best Model award and placed as the Top 15 semi-finalist.

=== Awards and honours ===
Year	Award(s) won	Awarded at
2015	Glam Icon	Glam Icon 2015 championship
2016	Rubaru Mr. India Global	Rubaru Mr. India 2016 championship
2016	Best Model	Rubaru Mr. India 2016 championship
2016	Best Model (International)	Mister Global 2016 championship
2021	Best International Model	Achievers Awards 2020-21

== See also ==
- Rohit Khandelwal
- Puneet Beniwal
