= Mister World 2016 =

9th Mister World competition, male beauty pageant edition

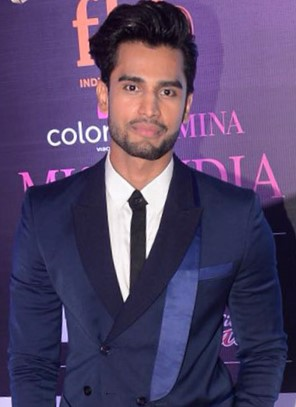
- Mister World 2016, Rohit Khandelwal.
- Date: July 19, 2016
- Presenters: Megan Young; Frankie Cena; Jordan Williams
- Entertainment: Micky Flanagan
- Venue: Southport Theatre and Convention Centre, Southport, England
- Entrants: 46
- Placements: 10
- Debuts: El Salvador; Nepal; Nicaragua
- Withdrawals: Australia; Bahamas; Colombia; Dominican Republic; Latvia; Lebanon; Netherlands; Paraguay; Russia; Swaziland; Turkey; Ukraine; Venezuela
- Returns: Bulgaria; Costa Rica; Greece; Honduras; Kenya; Malaysia; Panama; Scotland; Sweden; United States
- Winner: Rohit Khandelwal; India

Mister World 2016 was the 9th edition of the Mister World competition, held at the Floral Hall of the Southport Convention Centre in Southport, England, on July 19, 2016.

At the end of the event, Nicklas Pedersen of Denmark was succeeded by Rohit Khandelwal of India.

== Results ==
=== Placements ===
Placement	Contestant
Mister World 2016	India – Rohit Khandelwal
1st Runner-Up	Puerto Rico – Fernando Alberto Alvarez
2nd Runner-Up	Mexico – Aldo Esparza Ramirez
Top 5	England – Christopher Bramell; Kenya – Kevin Oduor Owiti
Top 10	Brazil – Lucas Montadon; China – Chang Zhousheng; El Salvador – David Cristian Salinas; Poland – Rafal Jonkisz; Scotland – Tristan Cameron Harper

== Judges ==
The judges' panel for Mister World 2016 consisted of the following personalities:

- Julia Morley – Chairwoman and CEO of Miss World LTD
- Juan García Postigo – Mister World 2007 from Spain
- Francisco Escobar – Mister World 2012 from Colombia
- Carina Tyrrell – Miss England 2014

== Contestants ==
46 contestants competed for the title

Country/Terr.	Contestant	Age	Height	Hometown
Argentina	Robertino dalla Benetta Busso	27	1.94 m (6 ft 4 1/2 in)	Rosario
Austria	Fabian Kitzweger	23	1.77 m (5 ft 9 1/2 in)	Velm
Bolivia	Sebastián Molina Rivero	22	1.80 m (5 ft 11 in)	Warnes
Brazil	Lucas Montandon	26	1.87 m (6 ft 1 1/2 in)	Brasília
Bulgaria	Kaloyan Dimitrov Mihaylov	19	1.98 m (6 ft 6 in)	Sofia
Canada	Harjinder (Jinder) Atwal	28	1.85 m (6 ft 1 in)	Terrace
China	Chang Zhousheng	23	1.88 m (6 ft 2 in)	Hainan
Costa Rica	Daniel Antonio Alfaro Barrantes	24	1.78 m (5 ft 10 in)	Grecia
Curaçao	Danilo Christopher Juliet	20	1.89 m (6 ft 2 1/2 in)	Willemstad
Denmark	Rasmus Kamaei Pedersen	23	1.87 m (6 ft 1 1/2 in)	Horsens
El Salvador	David Arias Salinas	28	1.83 m (6 ft 0 in)	Ilobasco
England	Christopher Joseph Bramell	23	1.85 m (6 ft 1 in)	Liverpool
France	Kévin-Martin Gadrat	26	1.80 m (5 ft 11 in)	Lyon
Germany	Oleg Justus	28	1.88 m (6 ft 2 in)	Cologne
Ghana	Selorm Kwame Tay	25	1.72 m (5 ft 7 1/2 in)	Accra
Greece	Iraklis Kozas	26	1.80 m (5 ft 11 in)	Athens
Guadeloupe	Ludovic Letin	29	1.85 m (6 ft 1 in)	Guadeloupe
Honduras	Abelardo Enrique Bobadilla Rosa	28	1.80 m (5 ft 11 in)	Tegucigalpa
India	Rohit Khandelwal	26	1.82 m (5 ft 11 1/2 in)	Hyderabad
Ireland	Darren King	27	1.88 m (6 ft 2 in)	Athlone
Italy	Federico Carta	25	1.87 m (6 ft 1 1/2 in)	Carbonia
Japan	Yuki Sato	23	1.80 m (5 ft 11 in)	Tokyo
Kenya	Kevin Oduor Owiti	20	1.78 m (5 ft 10 in)	Nairobi
Malaysia	Mohammad Yusuf Bin Tony	25	1.80 m (5 ft 11 in)	Labuan
Malta	Timmy Puschkin Scerri	23	1.80 m (5 ft 11 in)	Valletta
Mexico	Aldo Esparza Ramírez	26	1.85 m (6 ft 1 in)	Jalisco
Moldova	Anatolie Jalbă	24	1.82 m (5 ft 11 1/2 in)	Chișinău
Nepal	Ganesh Agrawal	29	1.85 m (6 ft 1 in)	Kathmandu
Nicaragua	Edson Janyny Bonilla Álvarez	25	1.75 m (5 ft 9 in)	Managua
Nigeria	Michael Amilo	27	1.85 m (6 ft 1 in)	Enugu Ukwu
Northern Ireland	Paul Pritchard	26	1.84 m (6 ft 1/2 in)	Ballymena
Panama	Sergio Isaac Lopés Goti	29	1.85 m (6 ft 1 in)	Panama City
Peru	Alan Jhunior Massa Caycho	24	1.88 m (6 ft 2 in)	Ica
Philippines	Sam Valdes Ajdani	25	1.88 m (6 ft 2 in)	Iloilo City
Poland	Rafał Jonkisz	19	1.87 m (6 ft 1 1/2 in)	Rzeszów
Puerto Rico	Fernando Alberto Álvarez Soto	21	1.83 m (6 ft 0 in)	Coamo
Romania	Ion Garaba	23	1.82 m (5 ft 11 1/2 in)	Bucharest
Scotland	Tristan Cameron Harper	28	1.88 m (6 ft 2 in)	Broughty Ferry
South Africa	Armand du Plessis	27	1.82 m (5 ft 11 1/2 in)	Johannesburg
South Korea	Seo Young-suk	27	1.86 m (6 ft 1 in)	Seoul
Spain	Ángel Martínez Elul	21	1.87 m (6 ft 1 1/2 in)	Cartagena
Sri Lanka	Jake Elwood John Senaratne	22	1.85 m (6 ft 1 in)	Colombo
Sweden	Robin Mikael Mähler	27	1.81 m (5 ft 11 1/2 in)	Sollefteå
Switzerland	Betim Morina	18	1.83 m (6 ft 0 in)	Lausanne
United States	Alexander Ouellet	22	1.73 m (5 ft 8 in)	Boston
Wales	Joseph Anthony Street	28	1.91 m (6 ft 3 in)	Swansea

== Notes ==
=== Debuts ===
- El Salvador
- Nepal
- Nicaragua

=== Returns ===
Last competed in 2003:

- Scotland

Last competed in 2010:

- Kenya
- Malaysia
- Panama
- Sweden
- United States

Last competed in 2012:

- Bulgaria
- Costa Rica
- Greece
- Honduras

=== Crossovers ===
Manhunt International

- 2012: South Africa – Armand du Plessis
- 2016: Costa Rica – Daniel Antonio Alfaro Barrantes
- 2016: England – Christopher Joseph Bramell (2nd runner-up)

Mister International

- 2013: Panama – Sergio Isaac Lopés Goti
- 2015: Poland – Rafał Jonkisz
- 2015: Puerto Rico – Fernando Alberto Álvarez Soto (Top 10)
- 2015: Sri Lanka – Jake Elwood John Seneratne

Mister Supranational

- 2016: Poland – Rafał Jonkisz (Top 10)

Mister Global

- 2017: England – Christopher Joseph Bramell (2nd runner-up)
- 2018: Switzerland – Betim Morina

Mister Universal Ambassador

- 2015: Malaysia – Mohammad Yusuf Bin Tony

Mister Model International

- 2013: Nicaragua – Edson Janyny Bonilla Álvarez
- 2015: Peru – Alan Jhunior Massa Caycho
