= Gopinath Ravi =

Indian actor and Model

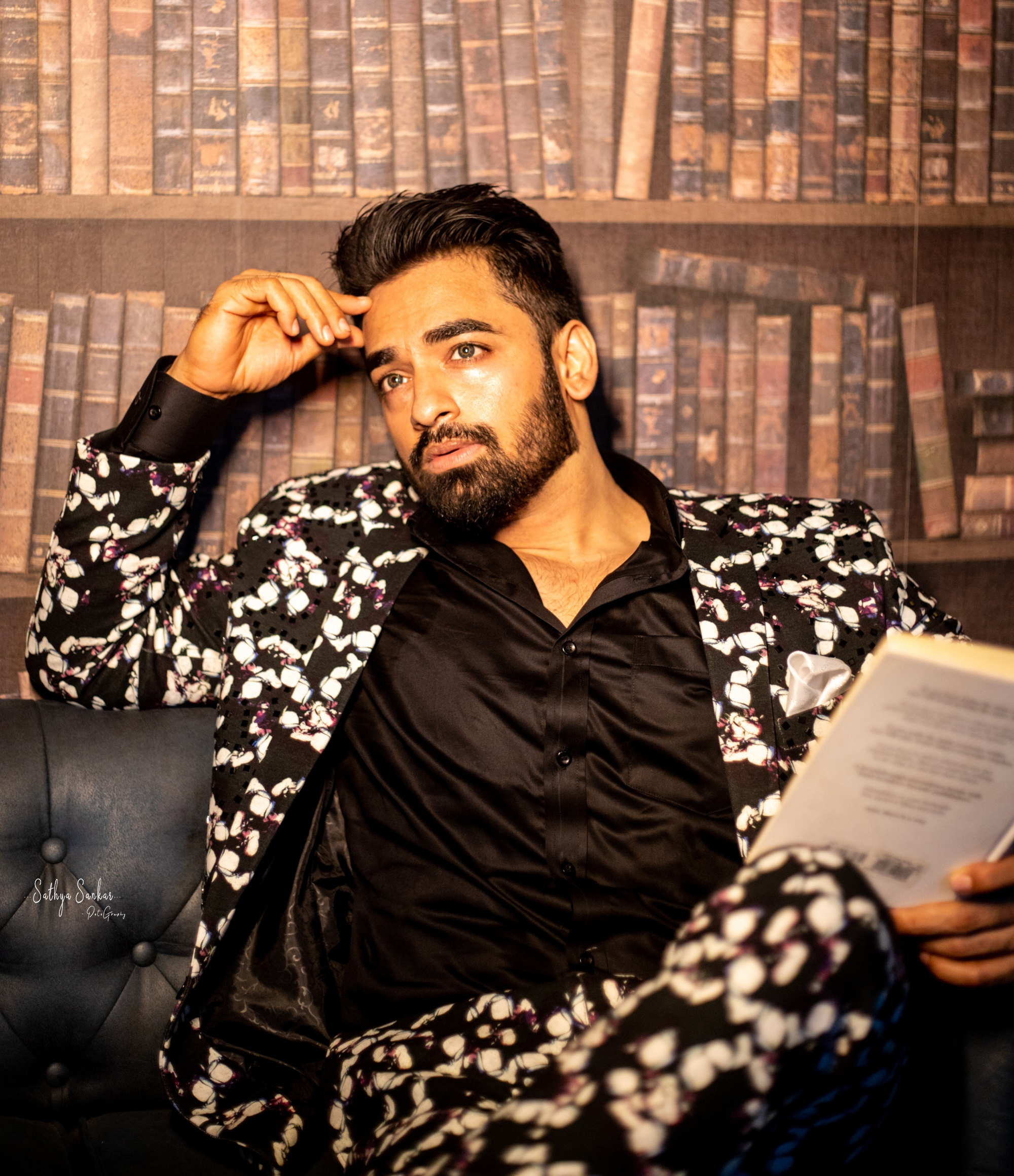
- Born: Pollachi, Coimbatore District, Tamil Nadu, India
- Education: PSG College of Arts and Science
- Occupations: Model; Actor; Engineer
- Known for: Rubaru Mister India 2021 Winner
- Spouse: Dr. Priyatharshini (m. 2022-present)
- Children: 1 (Vamikha Gopinath)

Gopinath Ravi (born 25 September) is an Indian model and an actor. He is the winner of Rubaru Mr. India 2021. He made his cinematic acting debut in 2020 in a Tamil film called Bagheera in Adhik Ravichandran's direction along with Prabhu Deva where he played a role of Sakshi Agarwal's boy friend. He will be representing India in the United States of America in the upcoming international pageant Master of Misters organised by TIM Management Group who also runs the Mister Model International pageant. He is the founder of Wyndow entertainments. He also have signed for various movies and web series.

== Early life, background and personal life ==
Gopinath Ravi was born on 25 September in Pollachi near Coimbatore, Tamil Nadu. He did schooling in Pollachi. He moved to Chennai along with the family after graduating from Coimbatore. He had won a state-level chess tournament and also the runner-up of' state-level basketball competition. He is married to his girlfriend Dr Priyatharshini, a dermatologist based in Chennai, on 29 August 2022 in ITC Grand Chola Hotel, Chennai. Gopinath Ravi and Dr. Priya were reportedly dating for more than a year before they got married. Daughter was born on 9 Sep 2023 in chennai and was named as Vamikha Gopinath.

== Fashion Industry ==
While trying to become an actor attending auditions since 2014, he got a chance in wardrobe advertisement for Christmas seasons directed by J. D.- Jerry Since then he started modelling seriously from 2015. And in 2017 he took up the modelling and acting as career.

He had participated in many regional fashion shows. Later he was selected in the audition for Rubaru Mr. India 2020. He have won the Amit Khanna's portfolio contest held by Rubaru and awarded a portfolio done by Amit Khanna (photographer). He also won various rounds in finale like talent round and fitness round.

He founded the Wyndow entertainment. Golden face of South India is a beauty pageant to spread awareness of skin donation for acid attack victims. It is a south India level contest auditioning in Chennai, Banglore, Hyderabad and Kochi. Director A. L. Vijay and actress Akshara Gowda officially launched it on August 13, 2023 in Chennai.

He had been showstopper for Malabar gold and diamonds - Bridal Jewellery Fashion Show, FFW Flair Fashion Week.

He is brand model for the various brands like Manyavar, Kandhan stores, Belmont tailors, Arcadio, Studio 24 Bespoke, Men Deserve.

He has also done Ad shoot for Varuna hill view by Vinayaka missions, K Chinnadurai & Co clothing store.

He has participated in more than 20 Designer and Fashion runways.

He is a celebrity host in Galatta Tamil media channel on YouTube channel. He have interviewed many celebrities. Notably his episodes of car date with celebrities and stay fit with mr. India acclaimed to be favourite of many. He along with Shalu Shamu gave the live review on galatta for Bigg Boss (Tamil season 6) which is airing in the Star Vijay.

== Social Works ==
During the lockdown imposed due to COVID-19 pandemic, He along with the trust SevaIsGood by Mr. AG Arul have helped the needy peoples. He provided food items & groceries to front-liner in Chennai. He have served the food to people who are living in roadside and Street dogs. He along with Namitha Marimuthu who is Miss Trans Start International 2020 have helped LGBT peoples with food and groceries.

== Filmography ==
=== As actor ===
| Year | Title | Role | Language | Notes | Ref. |
|---|---|---|---|---|---|
| 2023 | Bagheera | Rohith (Boy friend of Reshma) | Tamil | Debut Film | |

=== Television ===
| Year | Shows | Role | Language | Channel |
|---|---|---|---|---|
| 2011 | Home Sweet Home | Contestant | Tamil | Vijay TV |

Gopinath Ravi emerged as the title winner of Rubaru Mr. India 2021.

== Awards and nominations ==
| Year | Award | Category | Ref. |
|---|---|---|---|
| 2021 | Rubaru Mr. India | Rubaru Mr India Asia Pacific Winner 2020-2021 | |
| 2021 | Rubaru Mr. India | Rubaru Mr India People Choice Winner 2020-2021 | |
| 2022 | South Indian Talent Awards | Fashion Icon of the year | |
| 2022 | FAB Stars Iconic Awards | Trending couple of the year | |
| 2022 | Business Iconic Awards 2022 | Inspiring Model of the year 2022 | |
| 2022 | The Golden Crown Awards | Style Icon of the year. | |
| 2022 | Madarase India | Best Model of the year 2022 | |
| 2021 | FAB Stars Iconic Awards | Sensation of Tamil Nadu | |
| 2020 | FB Awards 2021 (Fashion & Business Awards) | Talk of the town | |
| 2020 | FEM-MAE | Mr Hindustan Runner Up | |
| 2020 | FEM-MAE | Mr South India 2020 | |
