= Myat Thuya Lwin =

Burmese model

- Born: Myat Thuya Lwin; 1994 (age 31–32); Myanmar
- Occupation: Model
- Title: Mister Global 2014 (Winner)
- Modeling information
- Height: 187 cm (6 ft 2 in)
- Hair color: Brown
- Eye color: Black

Myat Thuya Lwin (born 1994) is a Burmese model who gained popularity when he became the first Myanmar national to win the Mister Global competition in 2014.

== Early life ==
Myat Thuya Lwin was born in 1994 in Myanmar. He graduated with a bachelor's degree in psychology.

== Career ==
He represented Myanmar at the Mister Global 2014 pageant which was held in Bangkok, Thailand on March 27, 2014. By the end of the event, Myat Thuya Lwin was crowned the inaugural Mister Global 2014.
