= Man of the World 2022 =

4th Man of the World competition (2022), international male beauty pageant edition

- Date: 18 June 2022
- Presenters: Karla Henry; Fabio Ide
- Venue: Baguio Convention Center, Baguio, Philippines
- Entrants: 22
- Placements: 15
- Debuts: Chile; Dominican Republic; Iraq; Russia; Ukraine; United States
- Withdrawals: Belgium; Brazil; Colombia; Costa Rica; Haiti; Honduras; Lebanon; Liberia; Namibia; Panama; Portugal; Senegal; Sudan; Suriname; Syria; Thailand; Trinidad and Tobago; Venezuela; Zambia
- Returns: Japan; Malaysia; Nigeria
- Winner: Aditya Khurana; India
- Congeniality: Nadim El Zein (Philippines)
- Best National Costume: Nadim El Zein (Philippines); Francis Cervantes (Spain)
- Photogenic: Vladimir Grand (Ukraine)

Man of the World 2022 was the fourth edition of the Man of the World competition, held at the Baguio Convention Center in Baguio, Benguet, Philippines, on June 18, 2022.

Jin Kyu Kim of South Korea crowned Aditya Khurana of India as his successor at the end of the event.

== Results ==
=== Placements ===
Placement	Contestant
Man of the World 2022	India – Aditya Khurana
1st Runner-Up	Ukraine – Vladimir Grand
2nd Runner-Up	Philippines – Nadim El Zein
3rd Runner-Up	Netherlands – Tjardo Vollema
4th Runner-Up	Vietnam – Nguyễn Hữu Anh
Top 10	Czech Republic – Petr Kinský; Malaysia – Aiman Minsi; Nigeria – Ekwealor Victor; South Korea – Chang Wook Woo; Spain – Francis Cervantes
Top 15	Dominican Republic – Kenneth Castillo; Puerto Rico – Reynaldo Maldonado; Russia – Roman Fleet; South Africa – Shiv Ramsander; United States – Brandex Cruz

=== Special awards ===
Categories	Medalists
Best in Philippine Bahag	(gold) Netherlands – Tjardo Vollema; (silver) Ukraine – Vladimir Grand; (bronze) United States - Brandex Cruz
Best in Advocacy Interview	(gold) United States – Brandex Cruz; (silver) Puerto Rico – Reynaldo Amid Maldonado; (bronze) Netherlands - Tjardo Vollema
Pre-Arrival Favorite	(gold) Ukraine – Vladimir Grand; (silver) South Africa – Shiv Ramsander; (bronze) Philippines - Nadim El Zein
Press Favorite	(gold) Philippines – Nadim El Zein; (silver) Ukraine – Vladimir Grand; (bronze) Netherlands - Tjardo Vollema
Best in Swimwear	(gold) Spain – Francis Cervantes; (silver) Ukraine – Vladimir Grand; (bronze) Vietnam - Nguyễn Hữu Anh
Best in Beachwear	(gold) Malaysia – Aiman Minsi; (silver) Philippines – Nadim El Zein; (bronze) India - Aditya Khurana
Best in Formal Wear	(gold) Netherlands – Tjardo Vollema; (silver) Philippines – Nadim El Zein; (bronze) Ukraine – Vladimir Grand
Best in National Costume	(gold) Philippines – Nadim El Zein; (gold) Spain - Francis Cervantes; (silver) Netherlands – Tjardo Vollema; (bronze) Vietnam - Nguyễn Hữu Anh
Fashion of the World	(gold) South Korea – Chang Wook Woo; (silver) Spain – Francis Cervantes; (bronze) United States - Brandex Cruz
Mr. Personality	(gold) Dominican Republic – Kenneth Castillo; (silver) Czech Republic - Petr Kinský; (silver) Japan –Daishi Takano; (bronze) Chile - Rafael Muñoz; (bronze) Iraq - Darya Kamil
Mr. Congeniality	(gold) Philippines – Nadim El Zein; (silver) China – Chen Xing; (bronze) South Korea - Chang Wook Woo
Most Photogenic	Ukraine – Vladimir Grand
Mr. Multimedia	Ukraine – Vladimir Grand
Best in Physique	Ukraine – Vladimir Grand
Best in Bahag	Vietnam – Nguyễn Hữu Anh
Ray International Philippines Ambassador	United States – Brandex Cruz
Be Unrivaled Production Ambassador	Ukraine – Vladimir Grand
Sine Cordillera Film Ambassador	India – Aditya Khurana
Casa Infini Builders and Realty Ambassador	South Africa – Shiv Ramsander
RNJ Cosmetic Products Trading	Czech Republic – Petr Kinský
Benevolence Award	United States – Brandex Cruz
Attitude is Everything Award	Nigeria – Ekwealor Victor
Corporate Responsibility Award	Ukraine – Vladimir Grand
Mr. Fabularized Smile	Ukraine – Vladimir Grand
Vine Aesthetics Choice Award	Netherlands – Tjardo Vollema
Holiday Inn Express Manila - Travel of the World	Netherlands – Tjardo Vollema

- Order of announcements
  - Top 15
    - South Korea
    - Ukraine
    - Dominican Republic
    - Vietnam
    - United States
    - South Africa
    - Malaysia
    - Czech Republic
    - Russia
    - Puerto Rico
    - India
    - Nigeria
    - Spain
    - Philippines
    - Netherlands
  - Top 10
    - India
    - Philippines
    - Czech Republic
    - Nigeria
    - Netherlands
    - Malaysia
    - South Korea
    - Spain
    - Ukraine
    - Vietnam
  - Top 5
    - Philippines
    - Vietnam
    - Netherlands
    - India
    - Ukraine

== Contestants ==
Country	Contestant	Reference
Chile	Rafael Muñoz	
China	Chen Xing	
Czech Republic	Petr Kinský	
Dominican Republic	Kenneth Castillo	
India	Aditya Khurana	
Indonesia	Ari Wibowo	
Iran	Ali Reza Gharib Zadeh	
Iraq	Darya Kamil	
Japan	Daishi Takano	
South Korea	Chang Wook Woo	
Malaysia	Aiman Minsi	
Nepal	Summer Puree	
Netherlands	Tjardo Vollema	
Nigeria	Ekwealor Victor	
Philippines	Nadim El Zein	
Puerto Rico	Reynaldo Amid Maldonado	
Russia	Roman Fleet	
South Africa	Shiv Ramsander	
Spain	Francis Cervantes	
Ukraine	Vladimir Grand	
United States	Brandex Cruz	
Vietnam	Nguyễn Hữu Anh	

== Notes ==
=== Crossovers ===
Mister Supranational

- 2019: South Korea - Chang Wook Woo

Mister Global

- 2019: United States - Branden Allen Cruz

Men Universe Model

- 2018: United States - Branden Allen Cruz (Top 15)

Mister Tourism World

- 2021: Czech Republic - Petr Kinský (Top 10)

Mister Friendship International

- 2021: South Korea - Chang Wook Woo

Best Male Model of the Universe

- 2022: Puerto Rico - Reynaldo Amid Maldonado
