= Mister Japan =

Beauty contest

Mister Japan Organization ミスター・ジャパン
- Formation: 2010; 16 years ago
- Type: Male Beauty pageant
- Headquarters: Tokyo
- Location: Japan
- Members: Manhunt International; Mister World; Mister International; Mister Global
- Official language: Japanese
- Website: mrjapan.jp

Mister Japan (Japanese: ミスター・ジャパン) is an national male beauty pageant responsible for selecting Japan's representatives to the Manhunt International and Mister International pageant.

== History ==
The contest seeks to discover men who are not only good-looking, but also possess "intelligence, emotion, humanity, inner self, confidence," and who are highly expressive. Once selected as Mr. Japan, the man will then become involved in charity work and various media activities, establishing an image of a man who can be active on the international stage as a Japanese opinion leader.

== International Placements ==
=== Manhunt International Japan ===
- : Winner
- : Runner-up
- : Finalist or Semifinalist
- : Special Award Winner

Year	Prefecture	Mister Japan	Japanese Name	Placement at Manhunt International	Special Awards
2010	Tokyo	Yudai Kawano	河野雄大	Unplaced	
2011	Tokyo	Kenji Ogawa	小川健次	Unplaced	
2012	Aichi	Shintaro Kato	加藤真太郎	Unplaced	
2016	Tokyo	Hiroyuki Otsuka	大塚弘之	Unplaced	
2018	Tokyo	Yusuke Fujita	藤田祐介	Top 16	
2020	Kanagawa	Ryuta Kishigami	岸上 竜太	Unplaced	
2022	Tokyo	Kiichiro Sakamoto	坂本貴一郎	Top 16	
2025	Tokyo	Kenta Muramatsu	村松健太	Unplaced	
2026	Tokyo	Takuya Amagai	雨谷 拓矢	Unplaced	

=== Mister World Japan ===
- : Winner
- : Runner-up
- : Finalist or Semifinalist
- : Special Award Winner

Year	Prefecture	Mister Japan	Japanese Name	Placement at Mister World	Special Awards
2010	Hokkaido	Hareruya Konno	今野晴れるや	Unplaced	
2012	Nara	Junpei Watanabe	渡辺淳平	Unplaced	
2014	Tokyo	Tsuyoshi Akaboya	赤坊谷 剛	Unplaced	
2016	Tokyo	Yuki Sato	佐藤有紀	Unplaced	
2019	Tokyo	Kenta Nagai	永井健太	Unplaced	
2024	Tokyo	Tomohiro Mitani	三谷智大	Unplaced	

=== Mister International Japan ===
- : Winner
- : Runner-up
- : Finalist or Semifinalist
- : Special Award Winner

Year	Prefecture	Mister Japan	Japanese Name	Placement at Mister International	Special Awards
2014	Ibaraki	Masakazu Hashimoto	橋本正和	Top 10	Mister Photogenic
2015	Akita	Junpei Watanabe	渡辺淳平	Unplaced	
2016	Tokyo	Masaya Yamagishi	山岸雅也	1st Runner-up	Best International Model
2017	Tokyo	Taizan Matsuura	松浦泰山	Top 10	
2018	Tokyo	Tsuyoshi Takimura	滝村剛	Top 15	
Due to the impact of COVID-19 pandemic, no competition held between 2019—2021
2022	Niigata	Ryo Yatogo	八十郷りょう	Unplaced	Mister Congeniality
2023	Osaka	Kouki Sakata	坂田幸樹	Unplaced	Most Attractive Men
2024	Tokyo	Kodai Takahashi	高橋航大	Unplaced	
2025	Tokyo	Dan Reynolds	レイノルズ暖	Top 20	
2026	Fukuoka	Taisei Ezaki	江崎 大誠	Unplaced	

=== Mister Global Japan ===
- : Winner
- : Runner-up
- : Finalist or Semifinalist
- : Special Award Winner

Year	Prefecture	Mister Japan	Japanese Name	Placement at Mister Global	Special Awards
2016	Tokyo	Yusuke Fujita	藤田祐介	Top 16	
2017	Tokyo	Tomonori Matsuo	松尾友則	Unplaced	
2019	Tokyo	Kodai Hata	秦広大	Unplaced	
2021	Tokyo	Kiichiro Sakamoto	坂本喜一郎	Unplaced	
2022	Aomori	Sosuke Ichinohe	一戸宗介	Unplaced	
2025	Tokyo	Takumi Ozawa	小澤 巧	Unplaced	
2026	Tokyo	Dan Reynolds	レイノルズ暖	Top 20	

=== Mister Supranational Japan ===
- : Winner
- : Runner-up
- : Finalist or Semifinalist
- : Special Award Winner

Year	Prefecture	Mister Japan	Japanese Name	Placement at Mister Supranational	Special Awards
2016	Tokyo	Ricky Wakabayashi	リッキー若林	Top 10	
2017	Tokyo	Takanori Uekusa	植草隆則	Top 20	
2018	Tokyo	Jiro Matsumoto	松本次郎	Unplaced	
2019	Tokyo	Reino Shimamura	島村れい乃	Unplaced	
Did not compete between 2021—present
