= Umuchima =

Village in Imo state, Nigeria

Umuchima is a village near the city of Owerri, in the Owerri West Local Government Area of Imo state, Nigeria. Along with Ihiagwa, Eziobodo and Obinze, it borders the Federal University of Technology, Owerri (FUTO).
