= Misters of Puerto Rico =

National male beauty pageant competition in Puerto Rico

- Formation: 1998; 28 years ago
- Type: Beauty pageant
- Location: Puerto Rico
- Official language: Spanish
- President & Producer: Rubén Díaz

Mister Puerto Rico is the common name or sash used to identify a Puerto Rican representative in an international male beauty pageant. Several organizations have held annual male pageants in San Juan, Puerto Rico. Currently, Mister Puerto Rico Model and Mister Puerto Rico Teenager are the most important male beauty pageant events. Each year both events are held to select the representatives from the island.

== Misters of Puerto Rico ==
Misters of Puerto Rico is considered the largest, most important and prestigious event of fashion and male beauty in Puerto Rico. Throughout its history, this event has consolidated as a solid local and international prestige. The aim of Mister Puerto Rico is to present a series of exhibitions and developmental workshops for the Puerto Rican male. The Misters of Puerto Rico organization aims to develop personal and professional growth of the modern man. In 2016, the two largest male pageant organizations in Puerto Rico were merged when Mister Puerto Rico International, led by Miguel Deliz, was incorporated into Mister International Puerto Rico, led by Rubén Díaz.

While there are multiple local pageant agencies, Nuestra Belleza Puerto Rico, (Our Beauty Puerto Rico), is the one in charge of sending representatives to the international competitions.

=== Competition ===
Misters of Puerto Rico candidates live an enriching and learning experience, focusing on charitable causes and events of great significance in Puerto Rico. All activities promote the growth of the candidate to the "Final Competition":

- Workshops: Seminars about modeling and runway, projection and personal improvement. There is also training in personal care, physical assessment and fashion. The delegates attend workshops to refine how they pronounce words to improve their diction and learn to speak properly. Every year the misters receive preparedness workshops before the interview with the judges.
- Model's Week: During a weekend, the 78 candidates are involved in different activities of fraternization. They participate in photo shoots, interviews and charitable activities.
- Talent Competition: A spectacular evening filled with music, dance and art demonstrations. The winner gets a pass as a finalist to secure the final competition.
- Personal Interview: Each candidate presents his personality and interests before the panel of judges who evaluate each individual. Professional experts in different areas and personalities from the fashion and entertainment industries, are the ones who are responsible for the choice of each and every one of the prizes.
- Preliminary Competition / Final Competition: The candidates parade in swimwear, casual clothing and formal fashion apparel in the show which leads to the choice of winners.

=== Titleholders ===
==== Organized by Misters of Puerto Rico, Inc. ====
===== Mister Puerto Rico Model =====
Year	Titleholder	Placement at other Pageants	Municipality	Age	Height	Ref.
2000	Roberto "Sean" Osorio	-	Juncos			
2001	Cándido Torres	-	Cabo Rojo			
2002	Josean Castillo	Winner; Mister Model Millennium International 2002	Humacao			
2003	Alex "Ken" Aquino	Winner; Mister Model Millennium International 2003	Carolina			
2004	Eric David Meléndez	Winner; Modelo Look International 2004	Guaynabo			
2005	Francis González	Winner; Mister Mundial 2005	Fajardo	21	5'10"	
2006	Bryan Figueroa	Winner; Mr Latinoamerica 2006	Bayamón			
2007	Melvin Pagán	Winner; Mister Globe International 2007; 2nd runner-up Finalist; Mister Air Earth 2007	Manatí			
2008	Carlos Omar Rivera Díaz		Dorado	23		
2008	Javier Berberena	-	Orocovis	22		
2009	Heri Francisco Quiles Sáez	Winner; Mr World 2009; Mister Universe 2009 Manhunt International 2009; Mr Earth 2010 1st runner-up Finalist; Mister International 2009	Barranquitas	21	5'9"	
2010	Alexis "Alex" Martínez	Winner; Mister Earth 2010; Mr. America Intercontinental 2010; Mr. Hot Body Intercontinental 2010	Arecibo	25	5'10"	
2011	Nelson Omar Rodríguez Sterling	Winner; Mister Handsome International 2011; Semi-finalist; Mr. Manhunt International 2011 (1st Runner-up)	San Juan	25		
2012	Marcos Merced	Winner; Mister Mesoamerica Universe 2012	San Juan			
2013	Christopher Gutiérrez	Winner; Mr Universo Mundial 2013	Bayamón	22		
2014	Joshua D. Rojas Rivera	Winner; Mr Model Universe 2015 Mr Global Puerto Rico 2017	Arecibo	22		
2015	Juan Manuel Figueroa	Winner; Mister Mesoamerica Universe Puerto Rico 2015	Canóvanas	23		
2015	Joel Miranda		Bayamón	23		
2016	Carlos Jomar Rodríguez Cintrón		Naranjito	24		
2017	Armando Ramos		Orocovis	20		
2018	Edgar Gabriel Rivera	Winner; Mister Model Universe 2018	Bayamón	23		
2019	Sammy Ramos	Winner; Mister America International 2019	Las Piedras	25		

===== Mister Puerto Rico Teenager =====
Year	Titleholder	Placement at other Pageants	Municipality	Age	Height	Ref.
2000	Lo-Ammi Marin	-	Trujillo Alto			
2001	Jaime Hurd	-	Juncos			
2002	Johnny "Gio" Vélez	Winner; Mister Young International 2002	Manatí			
2003	Darwinn L. Ferrer	Winner; Mister Teen Continents 2003; Mister Young International 2004	Carolina			
2004	Gerard Lebrón	-	Santurce, San Juan	18	5'9"	
2005	Neville Messón	Winner; Mister Teen Mundial 2005	Carolina	16		
2006	Luis "Grekko" Valle	Winner; Mister Teen Mundial 2006	San Juan			
2007	Edgardo "Lando" Sasso	Winner; Mister Young Earth 2007	San Juan			
2008	Andrés Orlando Rentas	-	Santurce, San Juan	16	5'10"	
2008	Emmanuel Fuentes Concepción	Winner; Mister Teen Intercontinental 2008	Canóvanas	14		
2009	José Cortés Vergara	Winner; Mister Teenager Internacional 2009	Toa Alta			
2010	Juan Alejandro Serrano	Winner; Mister Caribbean Intercontinental 2010; Mr. Teen Jade International 2010				
2010	Jean Carlos Ruiz		Río Grande			
2011	Jeremie Meléndez	-	Vega Baja			
2012	Ariel Ferrer	-	Carolina			
2013	Héctor Luis Cruz Archilla	-	Naranjito			
2014	Oziel Otero Bruno	Winner; Mr Teen Mesoamérica Universe 2015	Barceloneta	18		
2015	Guillermo Pérez		Vega Baja	18		
2017	Kenneth Nieves	Winner; Mr Teen International Puerto Rico 2017	Toa Alta	19		
2019	Benny Barbosa		Juana Díaz	21		
2022	Randy Cott		Lares	19		

==== Mister Latin Model Puerto Rico ====
Year	Titleholder	Placement at other Pageants	Municipality	Age	Height	Ref.
2001	Abrahim Castro	Winner; Mister Handsome International 2001	Caguas			
2004	Dereck Casanova	-	Aibonito			
2005	Omar Martínez	Winner; Mister Expo World 2005	Arecibo			
2006	Noel Ruiz	-	Fajardo			
2007	Omar Maisonet	Winner; Mister Model Millennium International 2007	Vega Baja			
2008	Tommy Jr. Rodríguez Hernández	-		20		
2009	Lenny Armando López	-	Loíza	21		
2010	Jesús Oyola	-	Toa Alta			
2010	Pedro Márquez					
2011	Amaury Doble Rivera	Winner; Mister Earth 2011; Mr. Model Millennium International 2011	Guaynabo	21		
2012	Javier Díaz	Winner; Mister Mesoamerica Universe 2013; Mr Latin Model Turismo 2012	Canóvanas	25		
2013	José Santiago	Winner; Mister Golden International 2014				
2014	Ángel Zayas		Carolina	22		
2015	Juan Manuel Figueroa	Winner; Mister Mesoamerica World 2016	Canóvanas	23		
2016	Jeffrey Javier Cerda		San Juan	21		
2019	Carlos Anthony Paris Verdejo		Loíza			

===== Mister Teen Model Puerto Rico =====
Year	Titleholder	Placement at other Pageants	Municipality	Age	Height	Ref.
2004	Israel Pérez	Winner; Mister Gentleman International 2004	Juncos			
2005	Christian Lorenzo	-	Aguada			
2006	Emmanuel Maisonet	Winner; Mister Teen World Model 2006	Loíza			
2007	Peter Hornedo	Winner; Mister Teenager World 2007	Toa Baja			
2008	Emmanuel Fuentes Concepción	Winner; Mister Teen Intercontinental 2008	Canóvanas	14		
2012	Javier Otero	−	Toa Alta	16		
2013	Carlos González	Dethroned	Vega Baja			
2014	Obed Gabriel González	Dethroned	Moca	19		
2015	Eric Joel Rivas	Winner; Mister Teen America Internacional 2015	Florida	18		
2017	Manuel Acevedo	−	Bayamón			
2019	Raymond O'neill Acosta	−	Hormigueros	18		

===== Mister International Puerto Rico =====
Year	Titleholder	Placement at other Pageants	Municipality	Age	Height	Ref.
2009	Heri Francisco Quiles Sáez	Winner; Mister Puerto Rico Model 2009 Mr World 2009; Mister Universe 2009; Mr Earth 2010 1st runner-up Finalist; Mister International 2009	Barranquitas	21	5'9"	
2010	Alexander González Cruz	Winner; PR Male South Model 2009	Coamo	18		
2014	Jean Carlos Díaz	Winner; Manhunt USA 2013		25	6'0''	
2014	Christian Daniel Ortiz González	Winner Manhunt Puerto Rico 2014 1Semi-finalist; Mister International 2014	San Juan	25	6'0.5"	
2015	Fernando Alberto Álvarez Soto	Winner Mister World PR 2015 1st runner-up Finalist; Mister World 2016	Coamo	21	6'1''	
2016	Francisco Vergara	−	San Juan	24		
2017	Joseph Manuel Disdier	−	San Lorenzo	23		
2018	Julián Rivera	−	Vega Baja/ Dorado	27	6'0"	

===== Mister Puerto Rico International =====
Year	Titleholder	Placement at other Pageants	Municipality	Age	Height	Ref.
2010	David Ortiz	−	Hatillo	22	5'10''	
2014	Josué Amado Borges	1st runner-up Finalist; Mister Model International 2014	San Lorenzo	26	5'10''	
2015	Melvin Román	Winner; Mister Model International 2015	Adjuntas			
2018	James Feliciano	Semi-finalist; Mister Model International 2018	Ponce			

==== Mister Supranational Puerto Rico ====
Year	Titleholder	Placement at other Pageants	Municipality	Age	Height	Ref.
2016	Christián Trenche		San Juan	30	6'0"	
2018	José Alfredo Galarza	Winner; Mister Tourism International 2015	San Sebastián	27	5'11''	
2019	Héctor Manuel Rodriguez	−	Caguas	24	5'10''	
2019	Orlando Antonio Lagares Pieve	−	Juana Díaz/ Adjuntas	23	5'11''	

==== Manhunt Puerto Rico ====
Year	Titleholder	Placement at other Pageants	Municipality	Age	Height	Ref.
2009	Heri Francisco Quiles Sáez	Winner; Mister Puerto Rico Model 2009 Mr World 2009; Mister Universe 2009; Mr Earth 2010 1st runner-up Finalist; Mister International 2009	Barranquitas	21	5'9"	
2014	Christian Daniel Ortiz González	Winner Mister International PR 2014 1Semi-finalist; Mister International 2014	San Juan	25	6'0.5"	
2019	Kevin David González					
2019	Josemanuel Rosario	Winner; Best Model in the World PR 2018 3rd runner-up Finalist; Mister International 2019	Villalba	21	6'0''	

==== Mister Global Puerto Rico ====
Year	Titleholder	Placement at other Pageants	Municipality	Age	Height	Ref.
2011	Joshua Vélez		Arecibo	21		
2017	Joshua D. Rojas Rivera	Winner; Mr Model Universe 2015 Mr Puerto Rico Model 2014	Arecibo	25		
2017	Bryan M. Jiménez		Canóvanas			
2019	Eddie Ortiz		Ponce	26	5'11''	

==== Mister World Puerto Rico ====
Year	Titleholder	Placement at other Pageants	Municipality	Age	Height	Ref.
1996	Eliseo Paulo Cortés Melendez	−	Luquillo	25	5'11.5"	
1997	Germán Cardoso Méndez	1st runner-up Finalist; Mister World 1998	Bayamón	22	6'1"	
1999	Frank Daniel Rodríguez Robles	−	Toa Alta	26	6'2"	
2003	Edwin Enrique "Rocko Magnus" Iglesias Colón	−	Guaynabo	19	6'1.5"	
2007	Ariel Romeo Quiñones Morales	4th runner-up Finalist; Manhunt International 2005	Salinas	25	6'3"	
2010	Joshua Louis Dalmau Irizarry	−	Coamo	25	6'3"	
2012	Alberto Manuel Cerro López	−	Yabucoa	23	5'10"	
2014	Alberto Horacio Martínez Kezner	−	Bayamón	19	6'1''	
2016	Fernando Alberto Álvarez Soto	Winner Mister International PR 2015 1st runner-up Finalist; Mister World 2016	Coamo	21	6'0''	
2019	José Humberto Cotto Rodríguez	−	Río Grande	24	6'1"	

==== Best Model of the World ====
Year	Titleholder	Placement at other Pageants	Municipality	Age	Height	Ref.
2005	Jimmy Díaz	Winner Best Male Model of the World 2005				
2018	Josemanuel Rosario	3rd runner-up Finalist; Mister International 2019	Villalba	21	6'0''	
