= Mister Global 2022 =

8th edition of the Mister Global competition

- Date: February 11, 2023
- Venue: Royal Park Rajapruek, Chiang Mai, Thailand
- Broadcaster: Official broadcasters: Livestreaming (YouTube)
- Entrants: 39
- Placements: 15
- Debuts: Belgium; DR Congo; Colombia
- Withdrawals: Bolivia; Romania; Sri Lanka; United Kingdom
- Returns: Albania; Canada; Chile; Haiti; Nepal; Northern Cyprus; Netherlands; Poland; Singapore
- Winner: Juan Carlos Ariosa; Cuba
- Congeniality: Samuel Atana; Democratic Republic of the Congo
- Best National Costume: Mark Avendaño; Philippines
- Photogenic: Juan Carlos Ariosa; Cuba

Mister Global 2022 was the 8th edition of Mister Global pageant, held in Chiang Mai, Thailand on February 11, 2023. Danh Chiếu Linh of Vietnam crowned Juan Carlos Ariosa of Cuba as his successor at the end of the event.

== Results ==
=== Placements ===
Placement	Contestant
Mister Global 2022	Cuba – Juan Carlos Ariosa
1st Runner-Up	Colombia – Oscar Guerrero
2nd Runner-Up	Brazil – William Gama
Top 5	South Korea – Kim Hee Won; Thailand – Setthapan Thongsuk
Top 15	Chile – Demian Salinas; India – Chena Ram Choudhary; Mexico – Ángel Garciglia; Nigeria – Senator Isinwa; Northern Cyprus – Mehmet Ağazade; Peru – Julio Dulanto; Poland – Daniel Dejneżenko; South Africa – Pierre Nel; Spain – Jesús Miguel; Vietnam – Thạch Kiêm Mara

=== Special awards ===
Award	Contestant	Ref.
Best Charming Smile	Korea – Kim Heewon	
Best in Swimwear	Northern Cyprus – Mehmet Vahip Agazade	
Best Model	Switzerland – Santer Willy	
Best National Costume	Philippines – Mark Avendaño	
Mister Congeniality	DR Congo – Samuel Atana	
Mister Photogenic	Cuba – Juan Carlos Ariosa	
Mister Popularity	Nigeria – Senator Isinwa	
Most Inspiring Gentleman	Mexico – Angel Garciglia	

== Contestants ==
39 contestants competed for the title:

Country/Territory	Contestant	Hometown	Preliminary Points
Albania	Boris Gurtner	Tirana	7.62
Belgium	Matthias Coenjaarts	Brussels	7.55
Brazil	William Gama	Manaus	8.50
Cambodia	Khorn Lythean	Phnom Penh	7.09
Canada	Benjamin Filiatrault	Quebec	7.25
Chile	Demian Salinas	Santiago	8.29
Colombia	Oscar Guerrero	Nariño	8.25
Cuba	Juan Carlos Ariosa	Matanzas	8.45
Czech Republic	Leon Vonaký	Chomutov	7.34
Democratic Republic of the Congo	Samuel Atana	Kinshasa	7.43
Dominican Republic	Michael Gómez	Santo Domingo	7.25
France	Maxime Klinger	Kembs	7.66
Haiti	Abdias Augustin	Cap-Haïtien	7.79
Hong Kong	Kenson Seto	Hong Kong	7.94
India	Chena Ram Choudhary	Rajasthan	8.61
Indonesia	Sandhi Jonson	Padang	7.41
Japan	Sosuke Ichinohe	Misawa	7.95
Laos	Jacky Phimmachak	Vientiane	7.96
Macau	Calvin Chan	Macau	7.79
Mexico	Ángel Garciglia	Baja California Sur	8.12
Myanmar	Shein Min Thu	Yangon	7.54
Netherlands	Fransel Meyers	Curaçao	7.71
Nepal	Nutan Shrestha	Morang	7.67
Nigeria	Senator Isinwa	Umuchima	8.53
Northern Cyprus	Mehmet Ağazade	Famagusta	8.23
Panama	Carlos Córdova	David	7.61
Peru	Julio Dulanto	Lima	8.19
Poland	Daniel Dejneżenko	Warsaw	8.15
Philippines	Mark Avendaño	Biñan	8.09
Puerto Rico	Jorge Andrés Guzmán	Guayama	8.02
Singapore	Sean Nicholas Sutiono	Singapore	7.48
South Africa	Pierre Nel	White River	8.57
South Korea	Kim Hee Won	Jinju	8.34
Spain	Jesús Miguel	Algemesí	8.59
Sri Lanka	Hans Nathan Koch	Colombo	8.02
Switzerland	Willy Santer	Toulon	7.49
Thailand	Setthapan Thongsuk	Phuket	8.59
United States	Joshua Long	Georgia	8.04
Vietnam	Thạch Kiêm Mara	Ho Chi Minh City	8.35
