= Mister Global =

International male beauty pageant in Thailand

- Type: International male beauty pageant
- Parent organization: TPN Global Co., Ltd.
- Headquarters: Bangkok, Thailand
- First edition: 2014; 12 years ago
- Most recent edition: 2026
- Current titleholder: Dilhan Divrikli; Türkiye
- Founder: Pradit Pradinunt
- President: Piyaporn Sankosik
- Moto: Gentlemen With Essence
- Language: English; Thai
- Website: Official website

Mister Global is an annual men's beauty pageant that has been held in Thailand since it was founded in 2014. The competition's inaugural edition was held in the village of Pak Chong, located some 170 kilometers (105 miles) to the northeast of Bangkok, with 16 participants.

The reigning titleholder, Mister Global 2026 Dilhan Divrikli from Türkiye, was crowned on October 10th in Bangkok, Thailand.

== History ==
Initially begun as a promotional event in 2014, the Mister Global pageant has since evolved into an annual competition. Winners are selected based on a comprehensive evaluation of formal wear, swimwear, modeling skills, personal interviews, and their final appearance on the night of the competition.

In 2024, TPN Global took over the contest, with Piyaporn Sankosik as president.

As of 2024, over 70 countries and territories have participated in Mister Global. In recent years, the competition has seen consistent participation, with more than 30 countries competing annually in the last five editions. Some national organizations such as in Laos, Myanmar, and Thailand have established their own national Mister Global contests.

== Titleholders ==
Edition	Year	Date	Mister Global	Runners-Up				Location Venue	Entrants
Edition	Year	Date	Mister Global	First	Second	Third	Fourth	Location Venue	Entrants
1st	2014	March 27, 2014	Myat Thuya Lwin; Myanmar	Michael South; Canada	Lee Jun Ho; South Korea	Nguyễn Hữu Vi; Vietnam	Wilfred Placencia; Philippines	Nakhon Ratchasima, Thailand	16
2nd	2015	March 7, 2015	Nguyễn Văn Sơn; Vietnam	Yuber José Jimenez; Venezuela	Apiwit Kunadireck; Thailand	Diogo Bernardes; Brazil	Bryan Weber; France	Bangkok, Thailand	21
3rd	2016	May 6, 2016	Tomáš Martinka; Czech Republic	Thawatchai Jaikhan; Thailand	Chema Malavia; Spain	Giba Pignatti; Brazil	Noel Ng; Singapore	Chiang Mai, Thailand	30
4th	2017	May 20, 2017	Pedro Gicca; Brazil	Gerrie Havenga; South Africa	Christopher Bramell; England	Fabián Esteban Abello; Chile	Thuận Nguyễn; Vietnam	Chiang Mai, Thailand	28
5th	2018	July 22, 2018	Dario Duque; United States	Ahmed Lasheen; Egypt	Jakub Kucner; Poland	Dwayne Geldenhuis; South Africa	Staporn Moollisan; Thailand	Bangkok, Thailand	38
6th	2019	September 26, 2019	Jongwoo Kim; South Korea	Houssem Saïdi; Tunisia	José Luis Navarro; Spain	Kenan Murseli; Switzerland	Braulio Encarnación; Dominican Republic	Bangkok, Thailand	38
2020 Cancelled due to COVID-19 pandemic
7th	2021	March 15, 2022 September 5, 2022	Miguel Ángel Lucas; Spain (resigned) Danh Chiếu Linh; Vietnam (assumed)	Danh Chiếu Linh; Vietnam (originally first runner-up)	Dongwoo Shin; South Korea	Juan Carlos Da Silva; Venezuela	Gabriel Alejandro Ortiz; Mexico	Maha Sarakham, Thailand	33
8th	2022	February 11, 2023	Juan Carlos Ariosa; Cuba	Oscar Guerrero; Colombia	William Gama; Brazil	Not awarded		Chiang Mai, Thailand	39
9th	2023	November 26, 2023	Jason Bretfelean; India	Oliver Cheung; Hong Kong	Álvaro Flores; Chile	Kevin Davalos Tai; Taiwan	Lê Hữu Đạt; Vietnam	Maha Sarakham, Thailand	36
10th	2024	October 6, 2024	Daumier Corilla; Philippines	Manuel Romo; Spain	Favour Ogbuokiri; Nigeria	Patrick Pho-ngam Forstner; Thailand	Luiz Mascarenhas; Brazil	Bangkok, Thailand	32
11th	2025	October 5, 2025	Alejandro Ortega; Spain	William Badell; Venezuela	Alejandro Silva; Mexico	Riley Hedstrom; United States	Adriano Cupaioli; France	Bangkok, Thailand	36
12th	2026	October 10, 2026	Dilhan Divrikli; Turkey	Bethel Mbamara; Nigeria	Myron Jude Ordillano; Philippines	Anthony Moua; Hmong	Alejandro Quintero; Venezuela	Nonthaburi, Thailand	39

=== Country by number of wins ===
Country	Titles	Year
Vietnam	2	2015, 2021
Turkey	1	2026
Spain	1	2025
Philippines	1	2024
India	1	2023
Cuba	1	2022
South Korea	1	2019
United States	1	2018
Brazil	1	2017
Czech Republic	1	2016
Myanmar	1	2014

Assumed wins

Titles assumed following resignations.

Country or territory	Titles	Year(s)
Vietnam	1	2021

Resigned wins

Country or territory	Titles	Year(s)
Spain	1	2021

=== Continents by number of wins ===
Continent	Titles	Years
Asia	6	2014, 2015, 2019, 2021, 2023, 2024
Europe	3	2016, 2025, 2026
Americas	3	2017, 2018, 2022
Africa	0	
Oceania	0	

== Winners gallery ==
Mister Global 2026
Dilhan Divrikli
Turkey

Mister Global 2025
Alejandro Ortega
Spain

=== List of special awards winners ===
Year	Mister Congeniality	Mister Photogenic	Best National Costume	Mister Popularity	Best Model	Best Charming Smile	Mister Physique / Best in Swimwear	Best Talent	Most Inspirational Videos / Most Inspiring Gentleman
2014	Felipe Mejía; Costa Rica	Nguyễn Hữu Vi; Vietnam	Andy Wicaksana; Indonesia	Sameera Weerasinghe; Sri Lanka	Not awarded	Not awarded	Lee Jun Ho; South Korea	Ulan Omurbekov; Kyrgyzstan	Not awarded
2015	Bryan Weber; France	Jakub Smirak; Czech Republic	Apiwit Kunadireck; Thailand	Nguyễn Văn Sơn; Vietnam	Yun The-ho; South Korea	Not awarded	José López; Puerto Rico	Fajar Alamsyah; Indonesia	Not awarded
2016	Jaren Guerrero; Guam	Chema Malavia; Spain	Isuru Nagoda; Sri Lanka	Mark Bornilla; Philippines	Prateek Baid; India	Noel Ng; Singapore	Umut Mirza; Turkey	Asyraf Nordin; Malaysia	Not awarded
2017	Sujae Yoo; South Korea	Shi Yuquan; China	Menuka Alwis; Sri Lanka	Paing Soe Htun; Myanmar	Daniel Sampedro; Spain	James Ventura; Philippines	Gerrie Havenga; South Africa	Thuận Nguyễn; Vietnam	Not awarded
2018	Hamid Noor; Afghanistan	Betim Morina; Switzerland	Muhammad Hafizh; Indonesia	Kristian Sarmiento; Philippines	Mac Trung Kien; Vietnam	Marcus Jørgensen; Denmark	Kang Doo-hyung; South Korea	Roel van der Bas; Netherlands	Not awarded
2019	Angelo Amaro; Portugal	Chace Cheng; Hong Kong	Thiha Kyaw; Myanmar	Nguyễn Hùng Cường; Vietnam	Nelson Cáceres; Chile	Kiengkai Xouansouandao; Laos	Kenny Guerra; Panama	Not awarded	Not awarded
2021	Lewis Ellis; United Kingdom	Yaniel Ogando; Cuba	Abhishek Pramuditha; Sri Lanka	Emmanuel Somto; Nigeria	Bagus Ajidani; Indonesia	Juan Carlos Da Silva; Venezuela	Ariel Morales; Dominican Republic	Not awarded	Tseetej Shiwakoti; India
2022	Samuel Atana; DR Congo	Juan Carlos Ariosa; Cuba	Mark Avendaño; Philippines	Senator Isinwa; Nigeria	Willy Santer; Switzerland	Kim Hee Won; South Korea	Mehmet Vahip Agazade; Northern Cyprus	Not awarded	Angel Garciglia; Mexico
2023	Jeung Yoon Lim; South Korea	Daniel William Wijaya; Indonesia	Maligie Kamara; Sierra Leone	Kevin Davalos Wei Tai; Taiwan	Jordan Jiménez; Puerto Rico	Yi Fang Gao; Canada	Oliver Cheung; Hong Kong	Not awarded	Not awarded
2024	Luiz Mascarenhas; Brazil	Not awarded	Fernando Wenur; Indonesia	Baltej Tattla; England	Not awarded	Not awarded	Not awarded	Not awarded	Fernando Wenur; Indonesia
2025	Siwathep Khanderpor; Canada	Not awarded	Youphalat Phethany; Laos	Victor Ngoka; Nigeria	Not awarded	Not awarded	Not awarded	Not awarded	Jether Palomo; Philippines
2026	Myron Jude Ordillano; Philippines	Umberto Chianese; Italy	Reuben Adom; Ghana	Anthony Moua; Hmong	Not awarded	Not awarded	Htet Wai Aung; Myanmarr	Not awarded	Girish Ratna Shakya; Nepal

== List of Mister Global countries or territories ==
Country or territory	Debut	Join	Years competed	National title	Place	Best placement	First placed	Last placed	Notes
Afghanistan	2018	1	2018	Mister Afghanistan	0				Won Mr. Congeniality in 2018
Albania	2018	2	2018; 2022–present	Mister Albania	1	Top 16: David Qenanaj (2018)	2018: David Qenanaj (Top 16)	2018: David Qenanaj (Top 16)	
Australia	2015	1	2015	Mister Australia	0				
Azerbaijan	2016	1	2016	Mister Azerbaijan	0				
Bangladesh	2017	1	2017	Mister Bangladesh	0				
Belgium	2022	1	2022–present	Mister Belgium	0				
Bolivia	2021	1	2021	Mister Bolivia	0				
Brazil	2015	9	2015–present	Mister Brazil	8	Winner: Pedro Gicca (2017)	2015: Diogo Bernardes (3rd runner-up)	2025: Lucas Laet (Top 20)	Won Mister Kantharawichai's Favorite
Cambodia	2015	4	2015; 2018; 2022–present	Mister Cambodia	0				
Canada	2014	4	2014; 2016–2017; 2022–present	Mister Canada	2	1st runner-up: Michael South (2014)	2014: Michael South (1st runner-up)	2025: Siwathep Khanderpor (Top 20)	
Cape Verde	2014	1	2014	Mister Cape Verde	0				
Chile	2015	5	2015; 2017–2019; 2022–present	Mister Chile	4	2nd runner-up: Álvaro Carvajal (2023)	2015: Cristóbal Álvarez (Top 15)	2023: Álvaro Carvajal (2nd runner-up)	Won Best Model in 2022, Won Mister Kantharawichai in 2023
China	2016	4	2016–2017; 2019; 2024-2025	Mister China	3	Top 10: Shi Yuquan (2017)	2017: Shi Yuquan (Top 10)	2025: Tianxiang Zhao (Top 11)	Won Mr Photogenic in 2017
Colombia	2022	1	2022–present	Mister Global Colombia	1	1st runner-up: Oscar Guerrero (2022)	2022: Oscar Guerrero (1st runner-up)	2026: Kevin González (Top 20)	
Costa Rica	2014	2	2014; 2016	Mister Costa Rica	0				Won Mr. Congeniality in 2014
Croatia	2024	1	2024-present	Mister Global Croatia	1	Top 20: Carlos Wiher (2024)	2024: Carlos Wiher (Top 20)	2024: Carlos Wiher (Top 20)	
Cuba	2019	5	2019–present	Mister Global Cuba	4	Winner: Juan Carlos Ariosa (2022)	2019: Rubert Arías (Top 16)	2024: Rodolfo Fernández (Top 20)	Won Mr Photogenic in 2021 & 2022
Czech Republic	2015	7	2015–present	Muž Roku	2	Winner: Tomáš Martinka (2016)	2015: Jakub Šmiřák (Top 8)	2016: Tomáš Martinka (Winner)	Won Mr Photogenic in 2015
Democratic Republic of the Congo	2022	1	2022-present	Mister Democratic Republic of the Congo	0				Won Mr. Congeniality in 2022.
Denmark	2018	1	2018	Mister Denmark	0				Won Best Charming Smile in 2018.
Dominican Republic	2016	6	2016; 2018–present	Mister Dominican Republic	4	4th runner-up: Braulio Encarnación (2019)	2018: Frainy Figueroa (Top 16)	2024: Kenneth Castillo (Top 20)	Won Mr. Physique in 2021
Ecuador	2016	3	2016; 2021; 2023	Mister Ecuador	2	Top 10: Bruno Barbieri (2023)	2021: Fabricio Caicedo (Top 17)	2023: Bruno Barbieri (Top 10)	
El Salvador	2023	1	2023	Mister El Salvador	0				
Egypt	2018	2	2018–2019	Mister Egypt	1	1st runner-up: Ahmed Lasheen (2018)	2018: Ahmed Lasheen (1st runner-up)	2018: Ahmed Lasheen (1st runner-up)	
England	2017	1	2017	Mister England	1	2nd runner-up: Christopher Bramell (2017)	2017: Christopher Bramell (2nd runner-up)	2024: Baltej Tattla (Top 11)	
Ethiopia	2018	1	2018	Mister Ethiopia	1	Top 16: Abdulfetha Ali Hasen (2018)	2018: Abdulfetha Ali Hasen (Top 16)	2018: Abdulfetha Ali Hasen (Top 16)	
France	2014	6	2014–2016; 2021–present	Mister France	2	4th runner-up: Bryan Weber (2015); Adriano Cupaioli (2025)	2015: Bryan Weber (4th runner-up)	2025: Adriano Cupaioli (4th runner-up)	Won Mr. Congeniality in 2015
Germany	2018	1	2018	Mister Germany	1	Top 16: Jan Laskowski (2018)	2018: Jan Laskowski (Top 16)	2018: Jan Laskowski (Top 16)	
Guam	2014	4	2014; 2016; 2018–2019	Mister Guam	1	Top 16: Jaren Guerrero (2016)	2016: Jaren Guerrero (Top 16)	2016: Jaren Guerrero (Top 16)	Won Mr. Congeniality in 2016
Haiti	2019	2	2019; 2022–present	Mister Haiti	0				
Hong Kong	2018	4	2018–present	Mister Global Hong Kong	3	1st runner-up: Oliver Cheung (2023)	2018: Vincent Lau (Top 16)	2025: Xiao Ting Liu (Top 20)	Won Mr Photogenic in 2019; Mister Na Chuek's Favorite in 2021
India	2015	9	2015–present	Rubaru Mister India	6	Winner: Jason Dylan Bretfelean (2023)	2016: Prateek Baid (Top 16)	2024: Gemin Darin (Top 20)	Won Best Model in 2016; Most Inspirational Videos in 2021
Indonesia	2014	9	2014–present	Mister Global Indonesia	5	Top 8: Andy Mukti Wicaksana (2014)	2014: Andy Mukti Wicaksana (Top 8)	2024: Fernando Wenur (Top 20)	Won Best in National Costume in 2016, 2018 & 2024; Best Model in 2021; Best Talent in 2015; Best Selfie Challenge in 2021; Mister Photogenic in 2023; Best Video Presentation in 2024
Iraq	2017	1	2017	Mister Iraq	0				
Japan	2016	7	2016–2017; 2019–present	Mister Japan	2	Top 16: Yusuke Fujita (2016)	2016: Yusuke Fujita (Top 16)	2026: Dan Reynolds (Top 20)	
Kazakhstan	2017	2	2017	Mister Kazakhstan	1	Top 16: Nursultan Telmanov (2017)	2017: Nursultan Telmanov (Top 16)	2017: Nursultan Telmanov (Top 16)	
Kyrgyzstan	2014	1	2014	Mister Kyrgyzstan	0				Won Best Talent in 2014
Laos	2019	5	2019–present	Mister Global Laos	3	Top 11: Kisun Pansengmeruang (2024); Youphalat Phethany (2025)	2021: Pay Souliyamath (Top 17)	2025: Youphalat Phethany (Top 11)	Won Best Charming Smile in 2018
Latvia	2015	2	2015; 2017	Mister Latvia	0				
Lebanon	2015	2	2015–2016	Mister Lebanon	1	Top 15: Mohammad Akl (2015)	2015: Mohammad Akl (Top 15)	2015: Mohammad Akl (Top 15)	
Macau	2021	2	2021–present	Mister Global Macau	0				
Malaysia	2014	7	2014–2021	Mister Global Malaysia	3	Top 10: Asyraf Nordin (2016)	2015: Tuan Mohd Faiz (Top 15)	2017: Nazirul Mubin (Top 16)	Won Best Talent in 2016
Martinique	2018	1	2018	Mister Martinique	0				
Mexico	2018	6	2018–present	Mr Model Mexico	5	2nd runner-up: Gabriel Alejandro Silva (2025)	2019: Manuel Duarte (Top 16)	2025: Gabriel Alejandro Silva (2nd Runner-up)	Won Most Inspiring Gentleman in 2022; Bright Face in 2022
Morocco	2023	0	2023	Mister Morocco					
Myanmar	2014	8	2014–2017; 2019–2023	Mister Global Myanmar	6	Winner: Myat Thuya Lwin (2014)	2014: Myat Thuya Lwin (Winner)	2025: Di Yan (Top 20)	Won Best in National Costume in 2019; Mr. Popularity in 2017; People Choice in 2014; Smart Guy in 2022
Nepal	2016	4	2016; 2018–2019; 2022–present	Mr. Nepal	2	Top 10: Dikpal Karki (2016)	2016: Dikpal Karki (Top 10)	2026: Girish Ratna Shakya (Top 20)	Won Best Video Introduction in 2026
Netherlands	2016	3	2016; 2018; 2022–present	Mister Netherlands	0				Won Best Talent in 2018
Nigeria	2019	4	2019–present	Misters of Nigeria	4	2nd runner-up: Favour Ogbuokiri (2024)	2021: Emmanuel Somto (Top 17)	2025: Victor Ngoka (Top 11)	Won Mr. Popularity in 2021 & 2022; Voice for Changes in 2024
Northern Cyprus	2019	2	2019; 2022	Mister North Cyprus	2	Top 15: Mehmet Ağazade (2022)	2019: Süleyman Mullahasan (Top 16)	2022: Mehmet Ağazade (Top 15)	Won Best in Swimwear in 2022; Mr. Smile with Elephants in 2022
Pakistan	2018	1	2018	Mister Pakistan					
Panama	2016	5	2016–2017; 2019–present	Mister Panama	2	Top 15: Raúl Pinto (2023)	2017: Arturo Lugo (Top 16)	2023: Raúl Pinto (Top 15)	Won Best in Swimwear in 2019
Paraguay	2016	1	2016	Mister Paraguay	0				
Peru	2015	6	2015–2016; 2018–2022	Mister Global Peru	4	Top 13: Bruno Giovanni Yañez (2015)	2015: Bruno Giovanni Yañez (Top 13)	2025: Luigi Moron (Top 20)	
Philippines	2014	12	2014–present	Mister Global Philippines	12	Winner: Daumier Corilla (2024)	2014: Wilfred Placencia (4th runner-up)	2026: Myron Jude Ordillano (2nd Runner-Up)	Won Mister Internet Popularity in 2016 & Mister Popularity in 2018; Best Charming Smile in 2017; Best in Swimwear in 2017; Best in Pool Swimwear and Beachwear Presentation in 2017; Best Fitness Video in 2017; Best in National Costume in 2022; Mister Consistency in Fitness in 2023; Best Country Presentation Video in 2025; Mister V Square Global Icon in 2026; Mister Congeniality in 2026
Poland	2018	3	2018–2019; 2022–present	Mister Polski	3	2nd runner-up: Jakub Kucner (2018)	2019: Michal Jan Grudzień (Top 16)	2022: Daniel Dejneżenko (Top 15)	Won Shining Skin in 2022
Portugal	2018	3	2018–2021	Mister Portugal	1	Top 16: Angelo Amaro (2019)	2019: Angelo Amaro (Top 16)	2019: Angelo Amaro (Top 16)	Won Mr. Congeniality in 2019
Puerto Rico	2015	8	2015–2019; 2022–present	Misters of Puerto Rico	5	Top 8: José López (2015)	2015: José López (Top 8)	2025: Edrick Morillo (Top 20)	Won Mr. Physique in 2015
Romania	2021	1	2021	Mister Romania					
Russia	2017	1	2017	Mister Russia	0				
Singapore	2014	6	2014–2018; 2022–present	Mister Global Singapore	2	4th runner-up: Noel Ng (2016)	2014: Jonathan Seah (Top 8)	2016: Noel Ng (4th runner-up)	Won Best Charming Smile in 2016
South Africa	2017	7	2017-present	Mister Global South Africa	5	1st runner-up: Gerrie Havenga (2017)	2017: Gerrie Havenga (1st runner-up)	2025: Charl van Helsdingen (Top 20)	Won Mr. Physique in 2017
South Korea	2014	12	2014–present	Mister International Korea	11	Winner: Kim Jong Woo (2019)	2014: Lee Jun Ho (2nd runner-up)	2026: Jeong-chan Lee (Top 20)	Won Mr. Congeniality in 2017; Best Model in 2015; Best Charming Smile in 2022; Mr. Physique in 2014 & 2018; Mr. Physique in 2018; Earthglo Ambassador in 2021; Mister Lookergang Model in 2022; Mister Congeniality & Mister Kaeng Leng in 2023
Spain	2016	9	2016–present	Míster RNB España	8	Winner: Miguel Ángel Lucas Carrasco (2021) (dethroned/resigned); Miguel Alejandro Ortega (2025)	2016: Chema Malavia (2nd runner-up)	2026: Abel Villamor Díaz (Top 11)	Won Mr Photogenic in 2018; Best Model in 2017; Earthglo Video Challenge in 2021
Sri Lanka	2014	8	2014–present	Mister Global Sri Lanka	2	Top 8: Madura Peiris (2015)	2015: Madura Peiris (Top 8)	2025: Shenal Adithya (Top 20)	Won Best in National Costume in 2016, 2017, 2021; Mr. Popularity in 2014
Switzerland	2018	4	2018–present	Mister Suisse Francophone	2	3rd runner-up: Kenan Murseli (2019)	2019: Kenan Murseli (3rd runner-up)	2023: Marcel Ignacio Riera (Top 15)	Won Mr Photogenic in 2018; Best Model in 2022
Tajikistan	2017	1	2017	Mister Tajikistan					
Taiwan	2019	3	2019; 2023-present	Mister Taiwan	2	3rd runner-up: Kevin Davalos Tai (2023)	2023: Kevin Davalos Tai (3rd runner-up)	2024: Ace Lin (Top 20)	
Thailand	2014	10	2014–present	Mister Global Thailand	8	1st runner-up: Thawatchai Jaikhan (2016)	2014: Phubess Samkratoke (Top 8)	2025: Sitthirak Kaewniyom (Top 20)	Won Best in National Costume in 2015; People Choice in 2016; San Pu Loei Favorite in 2022
Tibet	2018	1	2018	Mister Tibet	0				
Togo	2019	1	2019	Mister Togo	0				
Turkey	2016	2	2016; 2024	Mister Turkey	1	Top 20: Can Tiras (2024)	2024: Can Tiras (Top 20)	2024: Can Tiras (Top 20)	Won Mr. Physique in 2016
Tunisia	2019	1	2019	Mister Tunisia	1	1st runner-up: Houssem Saïdi (2019)	2019: Houssem Saïdi (1st runner-up)	2019: Houssem Saïdi (1st runner-up)	
United Kingdom	2021	1	2021	Mister United Kingdom	0				Won Mr. Congeniality in 2021
United States	2014	6	2014; 2016; 2018–present	Mister Global USA	3	Winner: Dario Duque (2018)	2016: Leaon Gordon (Top 16)	2025: Riley Hedstrom (3rd runner-up)	
Uruguay	2025	1	2025	Mister Uruguay	1	Top 11: Bruno Romero (2025)	2025: Bruno Romero (Top 11)	2025: Bruno Romero (Top 11)	
Venezuela	2015	4	2015; 2018; 2021; 2024	Mister Venezuela	4	1st runner-up: Yuber José Jimenez (2015); William Badell (2025)	2015: Yuber José Jimenez (1st runner-up)	2025: William Badell (1st runner-up)	Won Best Charming Smile in 2018
Vietnam	2014	10	2014-present	Mister Global Vietnam	8	Winner: Nguyễn Văn Sơn (2015); Danh Chiếu Linh (2021*)	2014: Nguyen Huu Vi (3rd runner-up)	2023: Lê Hữu Đạt (4th runner-up)	Won Mr Photogenic in 2014; Mr. Popularity in 2015 & 2019; Best Model in 2018; Best Talent in 2017

== See also ==
- Man of the World (pageant)
- Manhunt International
- Miss and Mister Supranational
- Mister International
- Mister World
