= Mister Global 2023 =

9th edition of the Mister Global competition

- Date: 26 November 2023
- Presenters: Thitisan Goodburn; Anusith Sangnimnuan
- Venue: Maha Sarakham, Thailand
- Entrants: 36
- Placements: 15
- Debuts: El Salvador; Morocco
- Withdrawals: Albania; Belgium; Colombia; DR Congo; Haiti; Japan; Netherlands; Northern Cyprus; Peru; Poland; United States
- Returns: Ecuador; Malaysia; Russia; Taiwan
- Winner: Jason Dylan Bretfelean; India
- Congeniality: Jeung Yoon Lim, South Korea
- Best National Costume: Maligie Kamara, Sierra Leone

Mister Global 2023 was the 9th Mister Global competition, held in Maha Sarakham, Thailand, on 26 November 2023.

Juan Carlos Ariosa of Cuba crowned Jason Dylan Bretfelean of India as his successor at the end of the event.

== Results ==
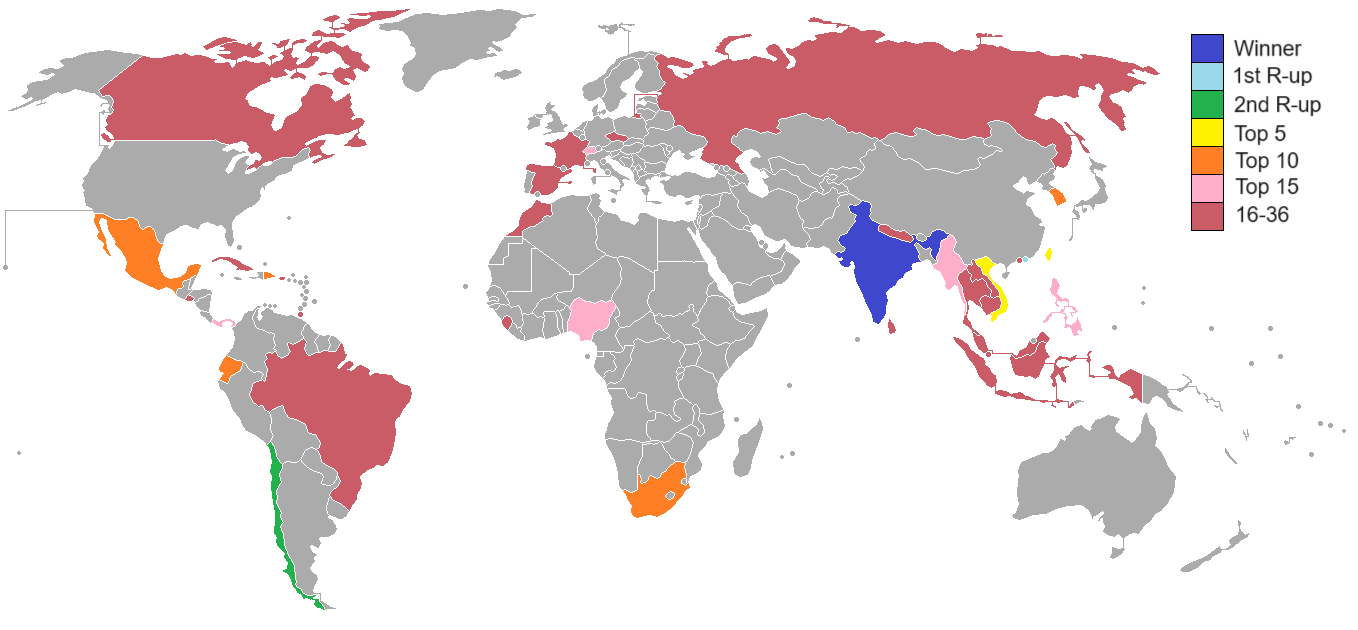
Final results of Mister Global 2023

=== Placements ===
Placement	Contestant
Mister Global 2023	India – Jason Bretfelean
1st Runner-Up	Hong Kong – Oliver Cheung
2nd Runner-Up	Chile – Álvaro Flores
3rd Runner-Up	Taiwan – Kevin Davalos Wei Tai
4th Runner-Up	Vietnam – Lê Hữu Đạt
Top 10	Dominican Republic – Alexander Vasquez; Ecuador – Bruno Barbieri Roggiero; Mexico – José Carlos Novelo; South Africa – Jonathan Lambert; South Korea – Jeung Yoon Lim
Top 15	Myanmar – Ye Thway Thiha; Nigeria – Shuaib Oluwaseyifunmi; Panama – Raúl Pinto; Philippines – John Ernest Tanting; Switzerland – Marcel Ignacio

=== Special awards ===
Award	Contestant	Ref.
Best Charming Smile	Canada – Yi Fang Gao	
Best Model	Puerto Rico – Jordan Cintrón Jiménez	
Best National Costume	Sierra Leone – Maligie Kamara	
Mister Congeniality	South Korea – Jeung Yoon Lim	
Mister Photogenic	Indonesia – Daniel William Wijaya	

== Contestants ==
36 contestants competed for the title:

Country/Territory	Contestant	Age	Hometown	PP
Brazil	Luiz Gustavo Mustafe Peres	29	Ribeirão Preto	8.02
Cambodia	Chomroeun Sovannareach	25	Kandal	7.51
Canada	Yi Fang Gao	24	Vancouver	8.19
Chile	Álvaro Andrés Flores Carvajal	22	Machalí	9.00
Cuba	Andy Gonzáles Quintana	27	Matanzas	8.18
Czech Republic	František Knobloch	23	Příbram	8.04
Dominican Republic	Ruddy Alexander Taveras Vasquez	22	Santo Domingo	8.74
Ecuador	Bruno Barbieri Roggiero	31	Guayaquil	8.90
El Salvador	Eric Rene Moreno Solis	28	La Unión	8.32
France	Jessy Jaremczyk	27	Gien	8.06
Hong Kong	Oliver Cheung Chi Kit	27	Hong Kong	9.06
India	Jason Dylan Bretfelean	19	Hyderabad	9.29
Indonesia	Daniel William Wijaya	25	Palembang	8.17
Laos	Sengphachanh Sengchanthavong	22	Phônhông	8.57
Macao	Rex Cheang Si San	28	Macao	8.55
Malaysia	Alejandro Kwang Liang Legaria Sim	23	Damansara	8.29
Mexico	José Carlos Novelo Puerto	26	Mérida	8.72
Morocco	Mickael Mounir Berrut	28	Agadir	8.43
Myanmar	Ye Thway Thiha	27	Yangon	8.61
Nepal	Samarpan Jung Karki	32	Biratnagar	8.27
Nigeria	Shuaib Oluwaseyifunmi Sosanya Araga	25	Lagos	8.67
Panama	Raúl Pinto Moran	32	Panama City	8.79
Philippines	John Ernest Tanting	22	Cebu City	8.68
Puerto Rico	Jordan O'Neill Cintrón Jiménez	26	San Germán	8.70
Russia	Ilgiz Farrakhov	29	Moscow	8.48
Sierra Leone	Maligie Kamara		Port Loko	7.98
Singapore	Muhammad Fuad Al-Hakim	33	Singapore	8.28
South Africa	Jonathan Albert Lambert	26	Krugersdorp	8.72
South Korea	Jeung Yoon Lim	26	Seoul	8.76
Spain	Pedro Cordero Infantes	21	Cartagena	8.51
Sri Lanka	Hiripitiyage Gihan Danushka Silva	29	Colombo	8.10
Switzerland	Marcel Ignacio Riera	29	Neuchâtel	8.73
Taiwan	Kevin Davalos Wei Tai		Taipei	8.72
Thailand	Patihan Pengsook		Wang Saphung	8.15
Trinidad and Tobago	Aaron Mohammed	30	Gasparillo	8.30
Vietnam	Lê Hữu Đạt	28	Ho Chi Minh City	8.74
