= Mister Global 2024 =

10th edition of the Mister Global competition

- Date: 6 October 2024
- Presenters: Anntonia Porsild; Kornkan Sutthikoses
- Theme: The Masculinity Manifesto
- Venue: MCC Hall, The Mall Bangkapi, Bangkok, Thailand
- Broadcaster: YouTube
- Entrants: 31
- Placements: 20
- Debuts: Croatia
- Withdrawals: Canada; Chile; Czech Republic; El Salvador; Macao; Morocco; Myanmar; Nepal; Russia; Switzerland; Trinidad and Tobago
- Returns: England; Pakistan; Turkey; Venezuela
- Winner: Daumier Corilla; Philippines
- Congeniality: Luiz Mascarenhas, Brazil
- Best National Costume: Fernando Wenur, Indonesia

Mister Global 2024 was the 10th Mister Global pageant, held at the MCC Hall, The Mall Bangkapi in Bangkok, Thailand on 6 October 2024. This was the first edition held under the ownership of TPN Global.

At the conclusion of the event, Daumier Corilla of the Philippines was crowned as Mister Global 2024 by Jason Bretfelean of India. This was the Philippines's first win in the pageant's history.

Contestants from thirty-one countries and territories competed in this edition. The competition was presented by Kornkan Sutthikoses and Miss Universe Thailand 2023, Anntonia Porsild, for the first time.

== Background ==
=== Location and date ===
The 10th edition was held in Bangkok, Thailand, under the ownership of TPN Global. The delegates took part in a series of activities leading up to the final, including photo shoots, cultural excursions and a beachwear competition. The final was held on 6 October 2024 at MCC Hall, The Mall Lifestore Bangkapi.

==== Debuts, returns, and withdrawals ====
This edition marked the debut of Croatia. Returning countries for this pageant included Turkey, which last competed in 2016; England in 2017; Pakistan in 2018; and Venezuela in 2021.

Chris Ncube of Zimbabwe withdrew from the competition for undisclosed reasons. Yogesh Shrestha of Nepal withdrew from the competition due to a serious leg injury.

== Results ==
=== Placements ===
Placement	Contestant
Mister Global 2024	Philippines – Daumier Corilla
1st Runner-Up	Spain – Manuel Romo
2nd Runner-Up	Nigeria – Favour Ogbuokiri
3rd Runner-Up	Thailand – Patrick Pho-ngam Forstner
4h Runner-Up	Brazil – Luiz Mascarenhas
Top 11	China – Keda Luo; England – Baltej Tattla §; Laos – Kisun Pansengmeruang; Mexico – Bryan Vázquez; Puerto Rico – Jose Ali García; South Korea – Yun Hyun Jae
Top 20	Croatia – Carlos Wiher; Cuba – Rodolfo Fernández; France – Julien Didier; India – Gemin Darin; Indonesia – Fernando Wenur; South Africa – Anton Siebert; Taiwan – Ace Lin; Turkey – Can Tiras; Venezuela – Sergio Gómez

§ – Voted to complete the Top 11 by winning Mister Popular Award

== Contestants ==
Thirty-one contestants competed for the title.

Country/Territory	Contestant	Age (Note: Ages at the time of the pageant)	Hometown
Brazil	Luiz Mascarenhas	27	São Paulo
Cambodia	Yanna Him	31	Phnom Penh
China	Keda Luo	21	Beijing
Croatia	Carlos Wiher	34	Zagreb
Cuba	Rodolfo Fernández	28	Havana
Dominican Republic	Kenneth Castillo	29	Jarabacoa
Ecuador	Ariel Delgado	22	Guayaquil
England	Baltej Tattla	26	London
France	Julien Didier	34	Montpellier
Hong Kong	Junyu Ye	26	Hong Kong
India	Gemin Darin	28	Pasighat
Indonesia	Fernando Wenur	26	Manado
Laos	Kisun Pansengmeruang	22	Luang Namtha
Malaysia	Siranjivy Karpaya	31	Kuala Lumpur
Mexico	Bryan Vázquez	24	Chihuahua City
Nigeria	Favour Ogbuokiri	23	Enugu
Pakistan	Attaullah Gujjar	22	Islamabad
Panama	Gilberto Peñalba	27	Chiriquí
Philippines	Daumier Corilla	28	Las Piñas
Puerto Rico	Jose Ali García	25	San Juan
Sierra Leone	Mohamed Savo Feika	24	Freetown
Singapore	John Sathguru	29	Singapore
South Africa	Anton Siebert	34	Mossel Bay
Spain	Manuel Romo	28	Badajoz
South Korea	Yun Hyun Jae	25	Seoul
Sri Lanka	Thilina Nirosha Udawatta	28	Colombo
Taiwan	Ace Lin	28	Taipei
Thailand	Patrick Pho-ngam Forstner	27	Udon Thani
Turkey	Can Tiras	26	Istanbul
Venezuela	Sergio Gómez	30	Caracas
Vietnam	Cao Quốc Thắng	21	Nha Trang
