= RNB España =

International beauty pageant

- Formation: 12 September 2019; 7 years ago
- Headquarters: Madrid
- Location: Spain
- Official language: Spanish
- Leader: Mr. Jesús Bueno and Mr. Juan Delgado
- Affiliations: Miss and Mister Supranational; Miss Global; Mister Global; Mister International
- Website: rnbespana.com

RNB España (Spanish: Reinado Nacional de Belleza® España) is an annual national competition in Spain that selects competitors for international male beauty pageants: Mister Supranational, Mister International, and Mister Global.

Not to be confused with Míster España or (Mister International Spain) which also holds an annual pageant that sends delegates to international competitions including Manhunt International, Mister World, and Mister Model.

In 2022, RNB España held its first female beauty pageant, which selected representatives for Miss Supranational.

== Background ==
RNB España (Reinado Nacional de Belleza España) was founded on September 12, 2019, by co-presidents Jesús Bueno and Juan Delgado, with Miss Universe Spain 2018 Ángela Ponce. RNB España joined the Mister International franchise on September 30, 2019, and on October 20, 2019, RNB joined the Mister Supranational franchise.

== International crowns ==
- Two – Mister Supranational winners:
  - Iván Álvarez (2023)
  - Pedro Cordero (2026)
- One – Mister Global winner:
  - Alejandro Ortega (2025)
- One – Caballero Universal winner:
  - Cristhian Naranjo (2021)

== Mister RNB España ==
The first Mister RNB España was held in Periana, Málaga from September 12 to 19, 2021. The following is a list of Mister RNB España pageant editions and information.

=== Titleholders ===
Edition & Date	Current Titles			Runners-Up			Host City	Entrants	Ref.
Edition & Date	Mister RNB España Supranacional	Mister RNB España Internacional	Mister RNB España Global	First	Second	Third	Host City	Entrants	Ref.
(6th) October 25, 2026	Illes Balears; Iván Cardell Soria; Diego Tarjuelo	Huesca; Ignacio Monclús	Seville; Juan Chacón	Lleida; Víctor López	Málaga; Jorge Ramiro	Salou, Tarragona	52		
(5th) October 25, 2025	Málaga; Pedro Cordero Pontevedra; Guillermo Lago (Resigned)	Huesca; Ignacio Monclús Tarragona; Ricard Lorenzo (Resigned)	name=La Rioja; Abel Villamor	Valencia; Luis Caparrós	name=Sevilla; José Manuel Cruz	Salou, Tarragona	Gipuzkoa; Enecko Cajigas	46	
(4th) October 12, 2024	Murcia; Pablo Herrera	Ciudad Real; Christian Losana	Valencia; Alejandro Ortega	Cantabria; Alberto García	Gipuzkoa; Unai Sarobe	Salou, Tarragona	Madrid; Francisco Cáceres	44	
(3rd) October 22, 2023	Huesca; Álvaro Germes	Gipuzkoa; Rafael Domínguez Nacho Sikora (Resigned)	Málaga; Pedro Cordero (Promoted)	Badajoz; Jorge Liaño	Not Elected	Salou, Tarragona	52		
(2nd) August 6, 2022	Pontevedra; Iván Álvarez	Teruel; Borxa Ramo	Alicante; Jesus Miguel Badajoz; Abel Muelas (Resigned)	Navarra; Trino Ávila	Not Elected	Biscay; Odei Jainaga	Nerja, Málaga	51	
(1st) September 18, 2021	Burgos; Manuel Ndele	Valladolid; Juan Pablo Colías Toledo; Miguel Ángel Lucas (Resigned)	Cantabria; Fernando Gutiérrez	A Coruña; David Souto	Not Elected	Periana, Málaga	52		

== Miss RNB España ==
The first edition of Miss RNB España was held in Torrox, Málaga from May 22 to 29, 2022. The following is a list of Miss RNB España pageant editions and information.

=== Titleholders ===
Edition & Date	Current Titles		Runners-Up		Host City	Entrants	Ref.
Edition & Date	Miss RNB España Supranacional	Miss RNB España Global	First	Second	Host City	Entrants	Ref.
(5th); April 11, 2026	Alicante; Gabriela Marqués	Valencia; Irene Cabrera	Granada; Teresa Ramírez	Pontevedra; Paula Rojas	Salou, Tarragona	46	
(4th); April 12, 2025	Madrid; Luna Negrín Palencia; Nelly Maryniuk	Not Elected	Segovia; Anabel Merillas	Valencia; Maira Díaz	Salou, Tarragona	50	
(3rd); April 13, 2024	Tenerife; Elizabeth Laker	Not Elected	Valencia; Martina Suárez	La Rioja; Ainara Martínez	Salou, Tarragona	46	
(2nd); April 29, 2023	Málaga; Lola Wilson	Not Elected	Toledo; Ornella Riva	Segovia; Sandra Pulido	Motril, Granada	24	
(1st); May 28, 2022	Cuenca; Ana Karla Ramírez	Not Elected	Seville; Caroline Rueda	name=León; Claudia Blanco	Torrox, Málaga	52	

== International placements ==
The following are the placements of RNB España representatives and titleholders in international pageants.

- : Declared as Winner
- : Ended as runner-up or top 5/6 qualification
- : Ended as one of the finalists or semifinalists
- : Ended as special awards winner

=== Current Titles ===
==== Men's pageants ====
Year	Mister Supranational	Mister International	Mister Global
2027	Illes Balears; Iván Cardell; TBD	Soria; Diego Tarjuelo; TBD	Huesca; Ignacio Monclús; TBD
2026	Málaga; Pedro Cordero; Mister Supranational 2026	Huesca; Ignacio Monclús; 1st Runner-up	La Rioja; Abel Villamor; Top 11
2025	Murcia; Pablo Herrera; Top 20	Ciudad Real; Christian Losana; Top 20	Valencia; Miguel Alejandro Ortega; Mister Global 2025
2024	Huesca; Álvaro Germes; Top 20	Gipuzkoa; Rafael Domínguez; Top 6	Badajoz; Manuel Romo; 1st Runner-up
2023	Pontevedra; Iván Álvarez; Mister Supranational 2023	Teruel; Borxa Ramo; Top 10	Málaga; Pedro Cordero; Non-Finalist
2022	Burgos; Manuel Ndele; Top 20	Valladolid; Juan Pablo Colías González; 5th Runner-up	Alicante; Jesus Miguel; Top 15
2021	Jaén; Lucas Munoz-Alonso; 4th Runner-up	No Pageant Held	Toledo; Miguel Ángel Lucas; Mister Global 2021 (Resigned)

==== Women's pageants ====
Year	Miss Supranational	Miss Global	Reinado Internacional del Café	Reina Hispanoamericana
2027	Alicante; Gabriela Marqués; TBD	TBA; TBD	TBA; TBD	TBA; TBD
2026	Palencia; Nelly Maryniuk; Top 12	Valencia; Irene Cabrera; Top 12	Las Palmas; Dayanara Rodríguez; Non-Finalist	Valencia; Maira Díaz; Non-Finalist
2025	Madrid; Luna Negrín; Top 24	Non-RNB España; Representatives	La Rioja; Ainara Martínez Latorre; Top 12	Ourense; Carolina Barroso; 2nd Runner-Up
2024	Tenerife; Elizabeth Laker; Non-Finalist	Non-RNB España; Representatives	Málaga; Lola Wilson; 2nd Princess	No Pageant Held
2023	Málaga; Lola Wilson; Top 24	Non-RNB España; Representatives	Soria; Irene Grande Pinto; Non-Finalist	Álava; Sara Lahidalga; Non-Finalist
2022	Cuenca; Ana Karla Ramírez Ortiz; Non-Finalist	Non-RNB España; Representatives	Málaga; Andrea De Cozar Martín; Non-Finalist	Non-RNB España; Representatives

=== Former Titles ===
==== Universal Woman ====
Year	Official delegate	Represented	Competition performance		Ref.
Year	Official delegate	Represented	Placements	Other award(s)	Ref.
2025	Iris Miguelez Medina	Pontevedra	1st Runner-up	MVLA Nueva Era	

==== Caballero Universal ====
Year	Official delegate	Represented	Competition performance		Ref.
Year	Official delegate	Represented	Placements	Other award(s)	Ref.
2022	Pablo Estrada	Soria	1st Runner-up	Mister Interactivo (Interactive Gentleman)	
2021	Cristhian Naranjo Gómez	Alicante	Caballero Universal 2021		

== See also ==
- List of beauty contests
