= Mister RNB España 2023 =

2nd edition of the Mister RNB España competition

- Date: October 22, 2023
- Venue: Alannia Salou Hotel, Salou, Tarragona
- Broadcaster: YouTube
- Entrants: 52
- Returns: Burgos
- Winner: Álvaro Germes; Huesca
- Congeniality: Hugo Teixeira; Segovia
- Photogenic: Víctor Sánchez; Girona

Mister RNB España 2023 was the 3rd Mister RNB España pageant. The competition was held on October 22, 2023, at the Alannia Salou Hotel in Salou, Tarragona. Iván Álvarez of Pontevedra, Borxa Ramo of Teruel, Jesús Miguel of Alicante and Pablo Estrada of Soria crowned their successors at the end of the event. The winners represented Spain at the Mister Supranational 2024, Mister International 2024, Mister Global 2023 and Caballero Universal 2024.

== Background ==
=== Location and date ===
On 20 September 2022, RNB España announced that Salou, Tarragona, on the tourism epicenter of Costa Daurada, will host Mister RNB España 2023 from Tuesday, October 17 to Sunday, October 22. During the week, all official representatives will enjoy various sights of Salou where the mayor of Salou, Pere Granados will welcome the representatives. The Finals will be held at the Alannia Salou Hotel on Sunday, October 22, at 07:00 p.m, with tickets to sell.

== Selection Committee ==
The following served as the panel of judges in selecting the best representatives to represent Spain in the international pageants:

- Ángela Ponce - Miss Universe Spain 2018
- Iván Álvarez - Mister Supranational 2023
- Lola Wilson - Miss Supranational Spain 2023
- Lugwing Olaizola - Doctor, Clinicas Dr. Olaizola Medicina Estetica
- Pere Granados - Mayor of Salou City
- Junior Zelaya - Journalist
- Hugo Battini - Director, Flash Back Salou
- Ricard Checa - Press Officer, Salou City
- Pawee Ventura - CEO of Missosology, COO of Mister International, Media Partner for Mister and Miss Supranational and Mister Global.
- Eric Francis Rodriguez ( Uno Rodriguez ) - President of Mister Grand International, Fashion Director, Paris-based Stylist and Missosology Global Head of Pageant Experts.

== Results ==
Color keys

- The contestant won in an International pageant.
- The contestant was a Finalist/Runner-up in an International pageant.
- The contestant was a Semi-Finalist in an International pageant.
- The contestant did not place.

=== Placements ===
Mister RNB España 🇪🇸 2023 finals was held in Salou via RNB España official YouTube channel on October 22, 2023.

Final results	Contestant	Ref.	International Placement
Mister RNB España Supranational	Huesca – Álvaro Germes Δ		Top 20; Mister Supranational 2024
Mister RNB España Internacional	Gipuzkoa – Rafael Domínguez Δ		Top 6 Mister International 2024
Mister RNB España Global	Navarra – Nacho Sikora		Resigned; Mister Global 2023
Mister RNB España Caballero Universal	Girona – Víctor Sánchez Δ		Did Not Compete; Caballero Universal 2024
1st Runner-Up	Málaga – Pedro Cordero		Unplaced; Mister Global 2023
2nd Runner-Up	Badajoz – Jorge Liaño		
Top 12	Cádiz – Abraham Riezu; Ceuta – Daniel Tafur; Madrid – Ale Rodríguez Δ; Soria – Ginés Ruiz; Valencia – Mario Izquierdo; Zaragoza – Rubén Muñoz §		
Top 24	Asturias – Carlos Regueiro; Ávila – Javier Zurita; Bizkaia – Izan García; Burgos – Fernando García; Granada – Carlos Bachiller; Guadalajara – Pablo Gómez; La Rioja – Rosen Stoychev; Lleida – Asier Cadenas; Palencia – Asier Valero; Segovia – Hugo Teixeira; Toledo – Jonathan Casado; Valladolid – José Antonio Prieto		

§ – placed into the Top 12 as the From the ground up challenge winner

Δ – placed into the Top 24 by fast-track challenges

=== Appointed titleholder ===
Title	Delegate	International placement
Mister RNB España Global 2024	Badajoz – Manuel Romo	1st Runner-Up; Mister Global 2024

=== Special awards ===
Final Results		Winner	Ref.	Finalists	Ref.
PRUEBAS CLASIFICATORIAS (Fast-track)	From The Ground Up (From The Ground Up)	Zaragoza – Rubén Muñoz		Guadalajara - Pablo Gómez; Valladolid - José Antonio Prieto	
PRUEBAS CLASIFICATORIAS (Fast-track)	Top Model (Top Model)	Gipuzkoa – Rafael Domínguez		Cádiz - Abraham Riezu; Huesca - Álvaro Germes; Girona - Víctor Sánchez; Granada - Carlos Bachiller; Málaga - Pedro Cordero; Navarra - Nacho Sikora; Salamanca - Joel González; Soria - Ginés Ruiz; Valladolid - José Antonio Prieto	
PRUEBAS CLASIFICATORIAS (Fast-track)	Mejor Cuerpo (Best Body)	Girona – Víctor Sánchez		A Coruña - Adrián Martín; Asturias - Carlos Regueiro; Badajoz - Jorge Liaño; Cádiz - Abraham Riezu; Ceuta - Daniel Tafur; Cuenca - Juan Manuel Tapia; Gipuzkoa - Rafael Domínguez; Guadalajara - Pablo Gómez; Huesca - Álvaro Germes; La Rioja - Rosen Stoychev; León - Javier Abad; Lleida - Asier Cadenas; Madrid - Ale Rodríguez; Navarra - Nacho Sikora; Palencia - Asier Valero; Segovia - Hugo Teixeira; Soria - Ginés Ruiz; Valencia - Mario Izquierdo; Valladolid - José Antonio Prieto	
PRUEBAS CLASIFICATORIAS (Fast-track)	Multimedia (Multimedia)	Segovia – Hugo Teixeira			
PRUEBAS CLASIFICATORIAS (Fast-track)	Turismo (Tourism)	Huesca – Álvaro Germes			
PRUEBAS CLASIFICATORIAS (Fast-track)	Alannia Salou	Madrid – Ale Rodríguez			
PREMIOS ESPECIALES (Special Awards)	Elegancia (Elegance)	Huesca – Álvaro Germes			
PREMIOS ESPECIALES (Special Awards)	Mejor Cabello (Best Hair)	Ávila – Javier Zurita			
PREMIOS ESPECIALES (Special Awards)	Mejor Rostro (Best Face)	Gipuzkoa – Rafael Domínguez			
PREMIOS ESPECIALES (Special Awards)	Simpatia (Congeniality)	Segovia – Hugo Teixeira			
PREMIOS PATROCINADORES (Sponsors Awards)	Mario Merin Photography	Girona – Víctor Sánchez			
PREMIOS PATROCINADORES (Sponsors Awards)	Loadys	León – Javier Abad			
PREMIOS PATROCINADORES (Sponsors Awards)	Dr. Olaizola Medicina Estetica	Soria – Ginés Ruiz			
PREMIOS PATROCINADORES (Sponsors Awards)	One Air Escuela de Aviacion	Valencia – Mario Izquierdo			
PREMIOS PATROCINADORES (Sponsors Awards)	Alfa Male	Segovia – Hugo Teixeira			

== Official delegates ==
Province	Candidate	Age	Ref.	Notes
A Coruña	Adrián Martín	25		
Albacete	Raúl Encinas	24		
Alicante	Adrián Gallera	35		
Almería	Alejandro García	30		
Araba	Rubén Pérez	35		
Asturias	Carlos Regueiro	23		
Ávila	Javier Zurita	36		
Badajoz	Jorge Liaño	27		2nd Runner Up
Barcelona	Alex Calamardo	26		
Bizkaia	Izan García	24		
Burgos	Fernando García	23		
Cáceres	Martín Carlos García	29		
Cádiz	Abraham Riezu	32		
Cantabria	Marcos Cobo	23		
Castellón	Arturo León	32		
Ceuta	Daniel Tafur	37		
Ciudad Real	Rodrigo Arroyo	33		
Córdoba	Rodrigo Arenas	25		
Cuenca	Juan Manuel Tapia	30		
Gipuzkoa	Rafael Domínguez	27		Mister RNB España International
Girona	Víctor Sánchez	26		Mister RNB España Caballero Universal
Granada	Carlos Bachiller	27		
Guadalajara	Pablo Gómez	24		
Huelva	Celestino Ceballos	28		
Huesca	Álvaro Germes	29		Mister RNB España Supranational
Illes Balears	Juan Calafell	31		
Jaén	Miguel Gavilán	31		
La Rioja	Rosen Stoychev	28		
Las Palmas	Aridane Macías	29		
León	Javier Abad	34		
Lleida	Asier Cadenas	21		
Lugo	Iván López	33		
Madrid	Ale Rodríguez	35		
Málaga	Pedro Cordero	21		Assumed Mister RNB España Global; 1st Runner Up
Melilla	Carlos Díaz	34		
Murcia	Guillermo Delgado	29		
Navarra	Nacho Sikora	24		Resigned Mister RNB España Global
Ourense	Sergio Jalda	31		
Palencia	Asier Valero	30		
Pontevedra	David Oubiña	31		
Salamanca	Joel González	23		
Segovia	Hugo Teixeira	35		
Sevilla	Fabio Jiménez	33		
Soria	Ginés Ruiz	28		
Tarragona	Xavier Flo	29		
Tenerife	Tanausú Hernández	35		
Teruel	Cata Muntean	24		
Toledo	Jonathan Casado	30		
Valencia	Mario Izquierdo	24		
Valladolid	José Antonio Prieto	31		
Zamora	Aitor González	30		
Zaragoza	Rubén Muñoz	19		
