= Mister RNB España 2022 =

2nd edition of the Mister RNB España competition

- Date: August 6, 2022
- Venue: Auditorio de los Jardines de la Cueva de Nerja, Nerja, Málaga
- Broadcaster: YouTube
- Entrants: 51
- Withdrawals: Burgos
- Winner: Iván Álvarez; Pontevedra
- Congeniality: Alejandro Barrio; Lugo
- Photogenic: Abel Muelas; Badajoz

Mister RNB España 2022 was the 2nd Mister RNB España pageant. The competition was held on August 6, 2022 at the Auditorio de los Jardines de la Cueva de Nerja in Nerja, Málaga. Manuel Ndele of Burgos, Juan Pablo Colías González of Valladolid, Miguel Ángel Lucas Carrasco of Toledo and Cristhian Naranjo Gómez of Alicante crowned their successors at the end of the event. The winners represented Spain at the Mister Supranational 2023, Mister International 2023, Mister Global 2022 and Caballero Universal 2022.

Iván Álvarez of Pontevedra was crowned Mister Supranational 2023, marking the first time in history for Spain and the first European country to do so.

== Background ==
=== Location and date ===
On 26 April 2022, RNB España announced that Nerja, Málaga, on the Costa del Sol, will host Mister RNB España 2022 from Sunday, July 31 to Sunday, August 7. During the week, all official representatives will enjoy various sights of Nerja. The Finals will be held at the Auditorio de los Jardines de la Cueva de Nerja on Saturday, August 6, at 10:00 p.m, with free admission.

== Results ==
Color keys

- The contestant won in an International pageant.
- The contestant was a Finalist/Runner-up in an International pageant.
- The contestant was a Semi-Finalist in an International pageant.
- The contestant did not place.

=== Placements ===
Mister RNB España 🇪🇸 2022 finals was held in Nerja via RNB España official YouTube channel on August 6, 2022.

Placement	Contestant	Ref.	International placement
Mister RNB España Supranational	Pontevedra – Iván Álvarez Δ		Winner – Mister Supranational 2023
Mister RNB España Internacional	Teruel – Borxa Ramo Δ		Top 10 – Mister International 2023
Mister RNB España Global	Badajoz – Abel Muelas		Resigned – Mister Global 2022
Mister RNB España Caballero Universal	Soria – Pablo Estrada Δ		1st Runner-Up – Caballero Universal 2022
1st Runner-Up	Navarra – Trino Ávila		
2nd Runner-Up	Bizkaia – Odei Jainaga Δ		
Top 12	Alicante – Jesús Miguel		Top 15 – Mister Global 2022
Top 12	Araba – Abraham Riezu; Barcelona – Miquel Ruiz §; Córdoba – José Manuel Benítez; Murcia – Álvaro Herrera; Valencia – Rubén Navarro		
Top 24	A Coruña – Alberto Fraga Δ; Albacete – Antonio Espinosa; Asturias – Diego Martín Δ; Ávila – Pedro Pérez; Gipuzkoa – Félix Armas; Girona – Diego González; Granada – Amador Sánchez; La Rioja – Daniel Tato; Ourense – Marco Trigo; Salamanca – Óscar Izquierdo; Tenerife – Abraham Bethencourt; Toledo – Daniel Madrigal		

§ – placed into the Top 12 as the From the ground up challenge winner

Δ – placed into the Top 24 by fast-track challenges

=== Special awards ===
Final Results		Winner	Ref.	Finalists	Ref.
PRUEBAS CLASIFICATORIAS (Fast-track)	From The Ground Up (From The Ground Up)	Barcelona – Miquel Ruiz		Albacete - Antonio Espinosa; Badajoz - Abel Muelas; Cádiz - Miguel Ángel Camacho; Ciudad Real - Lorenzo Mateos-Aparicio; Jaén - José Carlos Sánchez; León - Ángel Martínez; Navarra - Trino Ávila; Pontevedra - Iván Álvarez; Teruel - Borxa Ramo	
PRUEBAS CLASIFICATORIAS (Fast-track)	Deporte (Sports)	Asturias – Diego Martín		Araba - Abraham Riezu; Bizkaia - Odei Jainaga; Ceuta - Carlos Ruiz; Málaga - Benjamín Nieto; Navarra - Trino Ávila; Palencia - Juan Fuentes; Tenerife - Abraham Bethencourt; Teruel - Borxa Ramo; Valencia - Rubén Navarro	
PRUEBAS CLASIFICATORIAS (Fast-track)	Mejor Cuerpo (Best Body)	Soria – Pablo Estrada		Alicante - Jesús Miguel; Bizkaia - Odei Jainaga; Ceuta - Carlos Ruiz; Gipuzkoa - Félix Armas; Ourense - Marco Trigo; Pontevedra - Iván Álvarez; Valencia - Rubén Navarro; Zaragoza - Abi Dieng	
PRUEBAS CLASIFICATORIAS (Fast-track)	Multimedia (Multimedia)	Bizkaia – Odei Jainaga		Almería - Javier Pérez; Badajoz - Abel Muelas; Barcelona - Miquel Ruiz; León - Ángel Martínez; Lugo - Alejandro Barrio; Murcia - Álvaro Herrera; Navarra - Trino Ávila; Segovia - Ignacio Sancho; Teruel - Borxa Ramo	
PRUEBAS CLASIFICATORIAS (Fast-track)	Talento (Talent)	A Coruña – Alberto Fraga		Las Palmas - Juan Antonio Sosa; Segovia - Ignacio Sancho; Toledo - Daniel Madrigal	
PRUEBAS CLASIFICATORIAS (Fast-track)	Top Model (Top Model)	Teruel – Borxa Ramo		A Coruña - Alberto Fraga; Ávila - Pedro Pérez; Badajoz - Abel Muelas; Barcelona - Miquel Ruiz; Córdoba - José Manuel Benítez; Huesca - Joan Lozano; Salamanca - Óscar Izquierdo; Soria - Pablo Estrada; Tenerife - Abraham Bethencourt; Zaragoza - Abi Dieng	
PRUEBAS CLASIFICATORIAS (Fast-track)	Turismo (Tourism)	Pontevedra – Iván Álvarez		Bizkaia - Odei Jainaga; Las Palmas - Juan Antonio Sosa; León - Ángel Martínez; Salamanca - Óscar Izquierdo	
PREMIOS ESPECIALES (Special Awards)	Elegancia (Elegance)	Teruel – Borxa Ramo			
PREMIOS ESPECIALES (Special Awards)	Fotogenia (Photogenic)	Badajoz – Abel Muelas			
PREMIOS ESPECIALES (Special Awards)	Mejor Cabello (Best Hair)	Granada – Amador Sánchez			
PREMIOS ESPECIALES (Special Awards)	Mejor Rostro (Best Face)	Badajoz – Abel Muelas			
PREMIOS ESPECIALES (Special Awards)	Simpatia (Congeniality)	Lugo – Alejandro Barrio			

== Official delegates ==
Contestants were officially confirmed to compete for Mister RNB España 🇪🇸 2022 during Imposición de Bandas which was broadcast live from Nerja, Málaga via RNB España official YouTube on August 4, 2022.

Province	Candidate	Age	Ref.	Notes
A Coruña	Alberto Fraga	22		
Albacete	Antonio Espinosa	24		
Alicante	Jesús Miguel	24		
Almería	Javier Pérez	26		
Araba	Abraham Riezu	31		
Asturias	Diego Martín	31		
Ávila	Pedro Pérez	23		
Badajoz	Abel Muelas	21		
Barcelona	Miquel Ruiz	26		
Bizkaia	Odei Jainaga	24		Represented Spain at the 2020 Summer Olympics in the javelin throw
Cáceres	Álvaro Andrada	22		
Cádiz	Miguel Ángel Camacho	34		
Cantabria	Sergio Noriega	30		
Castellón	Diego Galván	31		
Ceuta	Carlos Ruiz	30		
Ciudad Real	Lorenzo Mateos-Aparicio	30		
Córdoba	José Manuel Benítez	23		
Cuenca	Jan Pérez	24		
Gipuzkoa	Félix Armas	30		
Girona	Diego González	24		
Granada	Amador Sánchez	28		
Guadalajara	Yeint Pinilla	28		
Huelva	Juan Rodríguez	25		
Huesca	Joan Lozano	25		
Illes Balears	Antonino Paone	26		
Jaén	José Carlos Sánchez	27		
La Rioja	Daniel Tato	27		
Las Palmas	Juan Antonio Sosa	28		
León	Ángel Martínez	24		
Lleida	Robert Villamarín	25		
Lugo	Alejandro Barrio	27		
Madrid	José García	31		
Málaga	Benjamín Nieto	24		
Melilla	Alejandro González	24		
Murcia	Álvaro Herrera	25		
Navarra	Trino Ávila	33		
Ourense	Marco Trigo	23		
Palencia	Juan Fuentes	30		
Pontevedra	Iván Álvarez	29		
Salamanca	Óscar Izquierdo	23		
Segovia	Ignacio Sancho	25		
Sevilla	Segovia	23		
Soria	Pablo Estrada	31		
Tarragona	Alessandro Neve	25		
Tenerife	Abraham Bethencourt	24		
Teruel	Borxa Ramo	24		
Toledo	Daniel Madrigal	27		
Valencia	Rubén Navarro	25		
Valladolid	Adrián Otero	27		
Zamora	Rodrigo Martínez	33		
Zaragoza	Abi Dieng	21		
