= Mister RNB España 2021 =

1st edition of the Mister RNB España competition

- Date: September 18, 2021
- Venue: Periana, Málaga
- Broadcaster: YouTube
- Entrants: 52
- Placements: 24
- Winner: Manuel Ndele; Burgos
- Congeniality: Manuel Ndele; Burgos (tie); Gabriel Poyato; Cuenca (tie)
- Photogenic: José Luis Rodrigo; Albacete

Mister RNB España 2021 was the inaugural Mister RNB España pageant which were held in Periana, Málaga from September 12 to 19 2021. The winners were Mister RNB España Supranational; Manuel Ndele of Burgos, Mister RNB España Internacional; Juan Pablo Colías González of Valladolid, Mister RNB España Global; Miguel Ángel Lucas Carrasco of Toledo and Mister RNB España Caballero Universal; Cristhian Naranjo Gómez of Alicante. Cantabria's Fernando Gutiérrez Romano was 1st Runner-Up and Coruña's David Souto Naveiro was 2nd Runner-Up.

== Background ==
=== Location and date ===
On April 16, 2021, the meeting between RNB España with the Periana City Council resulted in the confirmation of the dates for the inaugural contest, which took place from September 12 to 19 in Periana, Málaga. The 52 candidates from all over Spain competed in the finals on Saturday, September 18, 2021.

== Results ==
Color keys

- The contestant won in an International pageant.
- The contestant was a Finalist/Runner-up in an International pageant.
- The contestant was a Semi-Finalist in an International pageant.
- The contestant did not place.

=== Placements ===
Final results	Contestant	Ref.	International Placement
Mister RNB España Supranational	Burgos – Manuel Ndele Δ		Top 20 – Mister Supranational 2022
Mister RNB España Internacional	Valladolid – Juan Pablo Colías		5th Runner-up – Mister International 2022
Mister RNB España Global	Toledo – Miguel Ángel Lucas		Winner – Mister Global 2021
Mister RNB España Caballero Universal	Alicante – Cristhian Naranjo Δ		Winner – Caballero Universal 2021
1st Runner-Up	Cantabria – Fernando Gutiérrez		
2nd Runner-Up	A Coruña – David Souto Δ		
Top 12	Bizkaia – José María Caballero; Cantabria – Fernando Gutiérrez; Málaga – Alejandro Gil; Murcia – Diego Navarro; Segovia – Jonatan Martínez; Sevilla – Francisco Rosado; Zaragoza – Gabriel Cristóbal		
Top 24	Albacete – José Luis Rodrigo; Ávila – Ethan Alcaraz; Cádiz – Joaquín Aguilar; Ciudad Real – Adrián Del Río; Gipuzkoa – Álex Uria Δ; Granada – Francisco Molina; Huelva – Jesús Olivero Δ; Jaén – Antonio Del Rosal Δ; Madrid – José García; Navarra – Dany Alen Δ; Ourense – Adrián Barinaga Δ; Tenerife – Francisco Junco		

Δ – placed into the Top 24 by fast-track challenges

=== Special awards ===
Final Results		Contestant	Ref.
PRUEBAS CLASIFICATORIAS (Fast-track)	Cultura (Culture)	Jaén – Antonio Del Rosal	
PRUEBAS CLASIFICATORIAS (Fast-track)	Deporte (Sports)	A Coruña – David Souto Naveiro	
PRUEBAS CLASIFICATORIAS (Fast-track)	Deporte Extremo (Extreme Sports)	Navarra – Dany Alen	
PRUEBAS CLASIFICATORIAS (Fast-track)	Mejor Cuerpo (Best Body)	Burgos – Manuel Ndele	
PRUEBAS CLASIFICATORIAS (Fast-track)	Multimedia (Multimedia)	Huelva – Jesús Olivero	
PRUEBAS CLASIFICATORIAS (Fast-track)	Talento (Talent)	Ourense – Adrián Barinaga	
PRUEBAS CLASIFICATORIAS (Fast-track)	Top Model (Top Model)	Gipuzkoa – Álex Uria	
PRUEBAS CLASIFICATORIAS (Fast-track)	Turismo (Tourism)	Alicante – Cristhian Naranjo Gómez	
PREMIOS ESPECIALES (Special Awards)	Mejor Cabello (Best Hair)	Palencia – Edgar Vela	
PREMIOS ESPECIALES (Special Awards)	Fotogenia (Photogenic)	Albacete – José Luis Rodrigo	
PREMIOS ESPECIALES (Special Awards)	Mejor Rostro (Best Face)	Cantabria – Fernando Gutiérrez	
PREMIOS ESPECIALES (Special Awards)	Elegancia (Elegance)	Valladolid – Juan Pablo Colías González	
PREMIOS ESPECIALES (Special Awards)	Simpatia (Congeniality)	Burgos – Manuel Ndele (tie); Cuenca – Gabriel Poyato (tie)	

== Official delegates ==
52 contestants competed for the title.

Province	Candidate	Age	Ref.	Placements
A Coruña	David Souto Oliveira	26		2nd Runner-Up; Premios: Deporte (Sports)
Albacete	José Luis Rodrigo Pérez	24		Top 24; Premios: Fotogenia (Photogenic)
Alicante	Cristhian Naranjo Ardeola	27		Mister RNB España Caballero Universal; Premios: Turismo (Tourism)
Almería	Javier Oliver Gómez	29		
Araba	Aitor Reina Torrente	22		
Asturias	Tae Young Hwee	25		
Ávila	Ethan Alcaraz Ruiz	29		Top 24; First openly transgender man to competing in a male beauty pageant.
Badajoz	Álvaro Muñoz Bellido	30		
Barcelona	Arnau Visa Puig	24		
Bizkaia	José María Caballero Valdivia	25		Top 12
Burgos	Manuel Ndele Ngokele	25		Mister RNB España Supranational; Premios: Mejor Cuerpo (Best Body) & Simpatia (Congeniality)
Cáceres	Giovanni Antonio Casale	27		
Cádiz	Joaquín Adrián Aguilar Ortiz	27		Top 24
Cantabria	Fernando Gutiérrez Esteban	25		1st Runner-Up; Premios: Mejor Rostro (Best Face)
Castellón	Claudio Bordeianu Igoriou	23		
Ceuta	Gabriel Luis Poyato	32		
Ciudad Real	Adrián Del Río Paredes	29		Top 24
Córdoba	Antonio Ruiz Rodríguez	23		
Cuenca	Ambaye Sall Sey	33		Premios: Simpatia (Congeniality)
Gipuzkoa	Álex Uria Urquia	23		Top 24; Premios: Top Model (Top Model)
Girona	Álex Herrerías Ballesteros	25		
Granada	Francisco Molina del Monte	25		Top 24
Guadalajara	Gonzalo Soriano Álvarez	25		
Huelva	Jesús Olivero Castaño	24		Top 24; Premios: Multimedia (Multimedia)
Huesca	Jorge Urieta Hernández	31		
Illes Balears	Kevin García Herrera	28		
Jaén	Antonio Del Rosal García	28		Top 24; Premios: Cultura (Culture)
La Rioja	David Alonso Ramírez	30		
Las Palmas	Yeney De La Cruz Ramos	20		
León	Jorge Pérez Castillo	32		
Lleida	Iván Pérez Planes	24		
Lugo	Diego Martin Alcalde	30		
Madrid	José García Giraldo	31		Top 24
Málaga	Alejandro Gil Soto	31		Top 12
Melilla	Mario Fernández Villegas	27		
Murcia	Diego Navarro Muñoz	26		Top 12
Navarra	Dany Alen Smith	29		Top 24; Premios: Deporte Extremo (Extreme Sports)
Ourense	Adrián Barinaga Robles	28		Top 24; Premios: Talento (Talent)
Palencia	Edgar Vela Vicente	29		Premios: Mejor Cabello (Best Hair)
Pontevedra	Pedro Cedeira Amus	25		
Salamanca	Marco Hernández Duque	25		
Segovia	Jonatan Martínez Infante	31		Top 12
Sevilla	Francisco Ángel Rosado Barroso	24		Top 12
Soria	Carlos Hervás Videna	25		
Tarragona	Sergio Pereira Extremera	27		
Tenerife	Francisco Junco Ferrer	24		Top 24
Teruel	Fernando Estelles Utrera	24		
Toledo	Miguel Lucas Monterrey	21		Mister RNB España Global
Valencia	Spirid Nikolov Yunusov	26		
Valladolid	Juan Pablo Colías Augusto	24		Mister RNB España International; Premios: Elegancia (Elegance)
Zamora	Fernando De La Torre Garmendia	29		
Zaragoza	Gabriel Cristóbal Ochoa	25		Top 12
