= Caballero Universal 2026 =

6th Caballero Universal competition, international male beauty pageant edition

- Date: November 17, 2026
- Presenters: Jheisson Rodriguez, Natalia Misell
- Hosts: Adriana Perez, Vanessa Maradonna
- Entertainment: Jacob Jimenez, Naty Soprano
- Venue: Teatro Junín, Caracas, Venezuela
- Broadcaster: Canal i
- Entrants: 18
- Placements: 18
- Winner: Garth Ezekiel Talusig; Philippines
- Congeniality: Janiel Doel Rios; Puerto Rico
- Photogenic: Calliel Gonzalez; Portugal

Caballero Universal 2026 was the sixth edition of the international male beauty pageant Caballero Universal. The competition was held on November 17, 2026 at the Teatro Junín in Caracas, Venezuela.

Eighteen contestants representing different countries competed for the title. At the conclusion of the event, Garth Ezekiel Talusig from the Philippines was crowned the winner by the former titleholder Caballero Universal 2025, Franco Daniel Cova of Venezuela.

Temitope Omotayo of Nigeria was named Virrey Caballero Universal, while Cristian Mandujano of Mexico finished as the first runner-up. Talusig became the first Filipino, Asian and Kalinga native to win the Caballero Universal title.

== Background ==
Caballero Universal 2026 was organized under the direction of Venezuelan fashion designer Rafael Enrique Ramírez Montes, professionally known as Raenrra. The sixth edition was hosted by Venezuela and brought together male representatives from different countries for a series of cultural, sporting and fashion-related activities.

The international concentration began on 7 November 2026, with the contestants participating in activities throughout Caracas and other destinations in Venezuela. The organizers initially announced a larger international participation, while 18 contestants were ultimately reported as competing in the final event.

== Pageant ==
=== Selection committee ===
The judging panel consisted of seven members; Carmen Elena de Lucia, Consuelo Russo, Dayana Leandro, Dulce Medina, Maria Luisa Lopez, Rita di Mattia and Tamara Diaz.

=== Hosts and performers ===
The final event was hosted by Venezuelan presenters Adriana Pérez and Vanessa Maradona. Jheisson Rodriguez and Natalia Misell served as correspondents. Musical performances during the ceremony were provided by Jacob Jiménez and Naty Soprano.

=== Winner ===
==== Garth Ezekiel Talusig ====
Garth Ezekiel Talusig represented the Philippines and won the Caballero Universal 2026 title. He was crowned by the outgoing titleholder, Franco Daniel Cova of Venezuela, on November 17, 2026 at Teatro Junín in Caracas. Talusig is from Barangay Lubo in Tanudan, Kalinga, Philippines. Before competing internationally, he won the Great Man Caballero Universal Filipinas 2026 title during the Great Man of the Universe Philippines competition on June 11, 2026. He holds a degree in Tourism and Travel Management from the University of Baguio. His victory made him the first Filipino, Asian and Kalinga native to win the international title.

== Activities ==
=== Schedule ===
Caballero Universal 2026: Schedule of activities
Date	Event	Ref.
November 7	Arrival of contestants and commencement of the international concentration	
November 7–16	Tourism and cultural activities throughout Venezuela	
During the concentration	Sports challenge	
During the concentration	Preliminary fashion show	
During the concentration	Swimwear challenge, gastronomic experiences, press encounter and interviews with the judging panel	
November 17	Caballero Universal 2026 grand final at Teatro Junín, Caracas, Venezuela	
November 18	Scheduled departure of contestants	

=== Contestant arrivals and preliminary activities ===
The international contestants began arriving for the competition's concentration on November 7, 2026. During the week leading up to the final, the candidates participated in a programme of activities intended to showcase Venezuelan culture, tourism and hospitality. The activities included fashion shows, sporting challenges, travel and gastronomic experiences. The candidates also participated in a press conference and interviews with the judging panel. The programme combined promotional and cultural engagements with activities designed to evaluate the contestant's presentation, personality and physical fitness.

=== Competition format ===
Caballero Universal 2026: Competition format
Competition segment	Description	Ref.
Preliminary competition	Contestants participated in preliminary activities, including sports challenges, fashion presentations, swimwear activities, tourism and cultural experiences, and interviews with the judging panel.	
Final competition	The final competition was held on November 17, 2026 at Teatro Junín in Caracas, Venezuela, featuring the contestants in the final presentation and competition segments before the announcement of the results.	

=== Preliminary competition ===
The preliminary activities included fashion presentations and a swimwear segment. The candidates also underwent interviews with the judges as part of the competition's evaluation process.

=== Final competition ===
The final competition took place on November 17, 2026 at Teatro Junín in Caracas. The programme included an opening presentation, swimwear presentation, evening-gown competition and question-and-answer segment. The contestants competed for the main title and several special awards. The final event was broadcast live by Venezuelan television network Canal i.

== Results ==
Placement	Contestant	Ref.
Caballero Universal 2026	Garth Ezekiel Talusig; Philippines	
Virrey Caballero Universal 2026	Temitope Omotayo; Nigeria	
1st runner-up (First Prince)	Cristian Mandujano; Mexico	
2nd runner-up (Second Prince)	Daniel Villasmil; Venezuela	
3rd runner-up (Third Prince)	Merval Azevedo; Brazil	
4th runner-up (Fourth Prince)	Jorge Eduardo Arandia Terceros; Bolivia	
Top 10	Alejandro Angel Segura; Cuba	
Top 10	Michael Alejandro Gómez Ventura; Dominican Republic	
Top 10	Hasit Parikh; India	
Top 10	Janiel Doel Rios; Puerto Rico	
Top 18	Pedro Pablo Zamorano Arenas; Chile	
Top 18	Sebastian Rios; Colombia	
Top 18	Brandon Maldonado; Ecuador	
Top 18	Teodoro Sanchez; Haiti	
Top 18	Elio Carrion; Honduras	
Top 18	Josué Obregón; Nicaragua	
Top 18	Calliel Gonzalez; Portugal	
Top 18	Juan Manuel Tapia; Spain	

=== Special awards ===
Award	Recipient	Country/Territory	Ref.
Mister Simpatía (Mister Congeniality)	Janiel Doel Rios	Puerto Rico	
Mister Fotografico (Mister Photogenic)	Calliel Gonzalez	Portugal	
Mister Elegancia (Mister Elegance)	Alex Temitope Adetuwo	Nigeria	
Mister Elegance (runner-up)	Sebastian Rios	Colombia	
Mister Elegance (runner-up)	Cristian Mandujano	Mexico	
Mister Canal i	Cristian Mandujano	Mexico	
Mejor Sonrisa (Best Smile)	Merval Azevedo	Brazil	
Mejor Cuerpo (Best Body)	Calliel Gonzalez	Portugal	
Mister Pasarela (Best in Catwalk)	Michael Alejandro Gómez Ventura	Dominican Republic	
Best Multimedia Content Creator	Juan Manuel Tapia	Spain	
Best Multimedia Content Creator (runner-up)	Pedro Pablo Zamorano Arenas	Chile	
Best Multimedia Content Creator (runner-up)	Teodoro Sanchez	Haiti	

== Candidates ==
Eighteen contestants competed in the sixth edition of Caballero Universal.

Country	Contestant	Age (Note: Ages at the time of the pageant)	Hometown	Ref.
Bolivia	Jorge Eduardo Arandia Terceros	28	Santa Cruz	
Brazil	Merval Azevedo	26	—	
Chile	Pedro Pablo Zamorano Arenas	32	Rancagua	
Colombia	Sebastian Rios	32	—	
Cuba	Alejandro Angel Segura	26	—	
Dominican Republic	Michael Alejandro Gómez Ventura	34	—	
Ecuador	Brandon Maldonado	27	San Gabriel, Carchi	
Haiti	Teodoro Sanchez	36	—	
Honduras	Elio Carrion	23	—	
India	Hasit Parikh	24	Maharashtra	
Mexico	Cristian Mandujano	26	Martínez de la Torre, Veracruz	
Nicaragua	Josué Obregón	28	Managua	
Nigeria	Temitope Omotayo	26	Oyo State	
Philippines	Garth Ezekiel Talusig	27	Barangay Lubo, Tanudan, Kalinga	
Portugal	Calliel Gonzalez	23	—	
Puerto Rico	Janiel Doel Rios	26	Rincón	
Spain	Juan Manuel Tapia	33	Almería	
Venezuela	Daniel Villasmil	22	Caracas	
