= Kramik Yadav =

Indian model (born 1993)

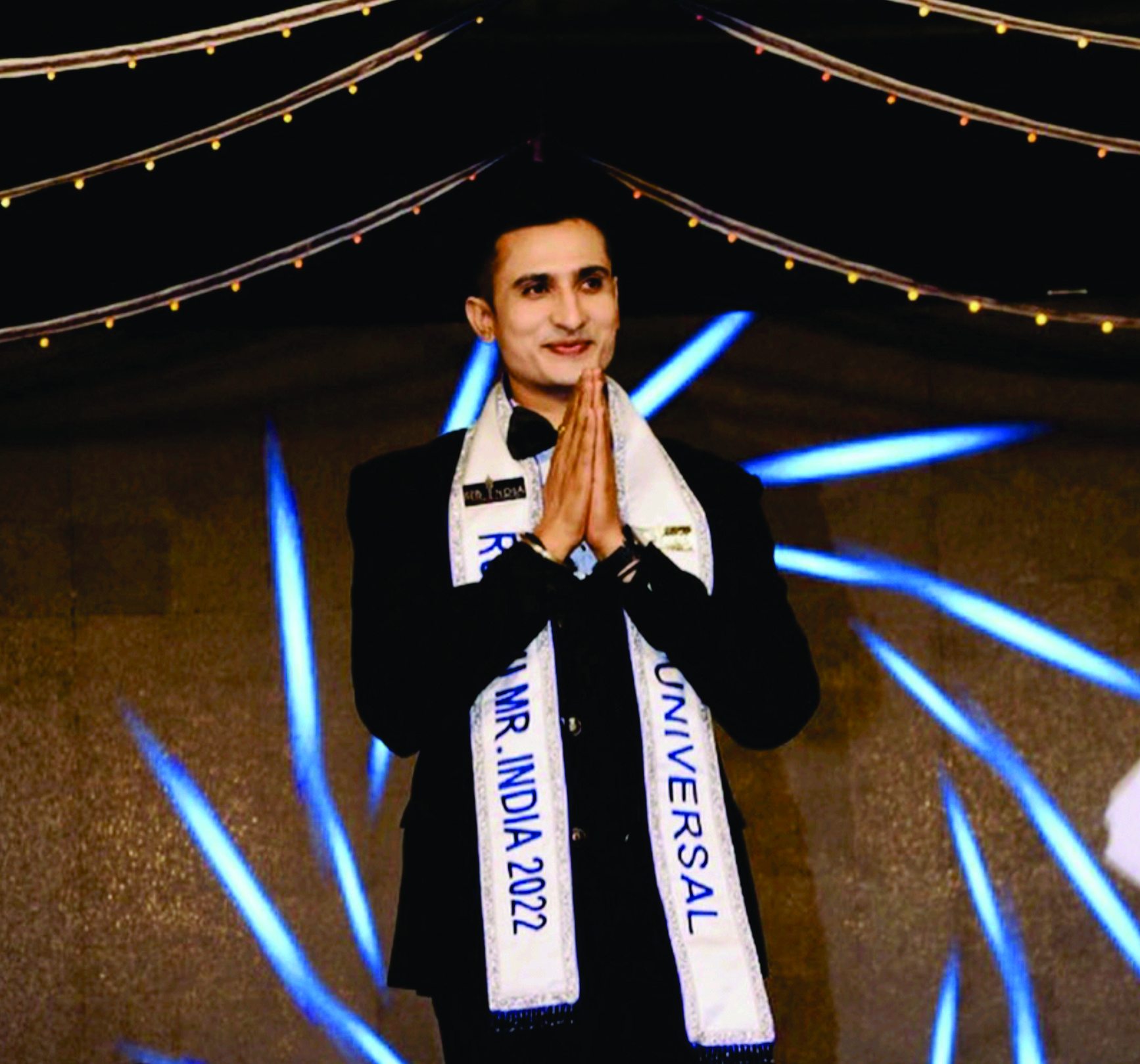
- Yadav in 2023
- Born: 5 November 1993 (age 32); Ahmedabad, Gujarat, India
- Occupations: Model; actor; choreographer
- Height: 1.85 m (6 ft 1 in)
- Beauty pageant titleholder
- Title: Mister India Universal 2022
- Hair colour: Black
- Eye colour: Brown

Kramik Yadav (born 5 November 1993) is an Indian model, actor, choreographer, and beauty pageant titleholder based in Ahmedabad, Gujarat. He is known for winning Rubaru Mr. India Universal 2022 and for representing India at the international male pageant Caballero Universal 2022, held in Venezuela, where he finished as Second Runner-up and received the Mister Elegance special award.

== Early life and education ==
Kramik Yadav was born on 5 November 1993 in Ahmedabad, Gujarat, India. His father is Poonam Yadav and his mother is Sushma Yadav. He has one brother, Kartik Yadav.

He completed his schooling at Shree Narayan Guru Vidyalay. Yadav later earned a diploma in Electronics and Communication Engineering from Excel Institute of Diploma Studies, Kalol, Gujarat, and subsequently completed a Bachelor of Commerce (B.Com.) degree from Lokmanya College, Ahmedabad. He also undertook formal training in acting and theatre at Rangyan Theatre, Ahmedabad.

== Career ==
Modelling and pageantry

Yadav began his professional modelling career in the early 2020s and participated in fashion pageants and runway shows across India. He has been invited as a jury member in more than 50 fashion shows.

In 2022, he won the title Mr. Gujarat and was later crowned Rubaru Mr. India Universal 2022 held in Chennai.

The same year, he represented India at Caballero Universal 2022 in Venezuela, where he placed as Second Runner-up and received the Mister Elegance award.

Dance and choreography

Yadav works as a dance choreographer, specialising in Garba and other Gujarati folk dance forms. He has choreographed cultural performances and Navratri programmes in Gujarat and has been associated with community and cultural events in the region.

Business

Yadav is also involved in his family's flower showroom and decorative services business, which has operated in Ahmedabad and other parts of India since 1988.

== Awards and recognition ==
Yadav has received several awards from cultural, social, and entertainment organisations, recognising his work in fashion, cultural performance, and social initiatives.
