= 2020 Spanish Athletics Championships =

- Edition: 100th
- Start date: 12 September
- End date: 13 September
- Host city: Various

The 2020 Spanish Athletics Championships was the 100th edition of the national championship in outdoor track and field for Spain. It was held on 12 and 13 September at various locations, due to restrictions during the COVID-19 pandemic.

The club championships in relays and combined track and field events were contested separately from the main competition.

== Venues ==
Venue	City	Events
Polideportivo Juan de la Cierva	Getafe	Sprints, hurdles and relays
Estadio de Vallehermoso	Madrid	Middle-distance, long-distance, steeplechase, pole vault, combined events and racewalking
Polideportivo Municipal José Caballero	Alcobendas	Jumps (except pole vault)
Polideportivo Municipal de Moratalaz	Madrid	Throw

== Results ==
=== Men ===
Event	Gold		Silver		Bronze	
100 metres (wind: +0.1 m/s)	Pablo Montalvo; A.D. Marathon	10.40 PB	Sergio Juárez; Playas de Castellón	10.52	Arnau Monne; F.C. Barcelona	10.52
200 metres (wind: -1.2 m/s)	Daniel Rodríguez Serrano; Playas de Castellón	21.08	Iván Piñero; Bahía Algeciras	21.67	Jaime Sardinero; Unicaja Jaén	21.71
400 metres	Bernat Erta; F.C. Barcelona	46.19 PB	Gen Esteban San Millán; Real Sociedad	46.70	Christian Iguacel; At. Intec-Zoiti	46.70 PB
800 metres	Mariano García; C.D. Nike Running	1:47.55	Javier Mirón; Alcampo Scorpio 71	1:47.76	Álvaro de Arriba; C.D. Nike Running	1:47.87
1500 metres	Kevin López; C.D. Nike Running	3:44.48	Ignacio Fontes; Playas de Castellón	3:44.96	Jesús Gómez; C.D. Nike Running	3:45.15
5000 metres	Abdessamad Oukhelfen; Playas de Castellón	13:47.26	Ouassim Oumaiz; Cueva de Nerja-UMA	13:48.08	Fernando Carro; C.D. Nike Running	13:49.88
110 m hurdles (wind: -1.7 m/s)	Asier Martínez; Grupompleo Pamplona At.	13.83	Enrique Llopis Doménech; C.A. Gandía	13.87	Luis Salort; Go Fit Athletics	14.02
400 m hurdles	Javier Delgado Osorio; F.C. Barcelona	50.59	Iker Alfonso; Grupompleo Pamplona At.	50.96 PB	Aleix Porras; F.C. Barcelona	51.18
3000 m s'chase	Fernando Carro; C.D. Nike Running	8:30.31	Daniel Arce; New Balance Team	8:30.65	Ibrahim Ezzaydouny; F.C. Barcelona	8:32.10
10 km walk	Álvaro Martín; Playas de Castellón	41:42.59	Mario Sillero; Real Sociedad	42:34.26	Luis Manuel Corchete; Atletismo Torrevieja	42:43.52
High jump	Carlos Rojas Lombardo; Unicaja Jaén	2.26 m PB	Xesc Tresens; F.C. Barcelona	2.19 m PB	Alexis Sastre; Playas de Castellón	2.13 m
Pole vault	Isidro Leyva; Unicaja Jaén	5.46 m	Adrián Vallés; Cueva de Nerja-UMA	5.36 m	Manel Miralles; Playas de Castellón	5.21 m
Long jump	Javier Cobián; Universidad Oviedo	7.79 m PB	Jean Marie Okutu; F.C. Barcelona	7.78 m	Daniel Solís; Playas de Castellón	7.52 m
Triple jump	Pablo Torrijos; Playas de Castellón	16.88 m	Marcos Ruiz Pérez; Playas de Castellón	16.60 m	Ramón Adalia; A.A. Catalunya	16.33 m PB
Shot put	Carlos Tobalina; F.C. Barcelona	18.83 m	José Ángel Pinedo; C.A. Fent Camí Mislata	18.56 m	Daniel Pardo González; A.D. Marathon	17.74 m
Discus throw	Lois Maikel Martínez; Playas de Castellón	60.02 m	José Lorenzo Hernández; F.C. Barcelona	54.79 m	Yasiel Sotero; Tenerife Cajacanarias	54.35 m
Hammer throw	Javier Cienfuegos; Playas de Castellón	74.92 m	Alberto González Moyano; Unicaja Jaén	68.82 m	Pedro José Martín Cazalilla; F.C. Barcelona	66.87 m
Javelin throw	Odei Jainaga; Real Sociedad	83.51 m CR	Nicolás Quijera; Grupompleo Pamplona At.	79.80 m	Pablo Bugallo; Playas de Castellón	69.56 m
Decathlon	Bruno Comín; A.D. Marathon	7303 pts	Mario Arancón; At. Numantino	7198 pts	Sergio Jornet; UCAM-Cartagena	7132 pts
4 × 100 m relay	Club de Atletismo Playas de Castellón; Daniel Rodríguez Serrano; Sergio Juárez; Mauro Triana; Javier Martín Estévez	40.45	Pamplona Atlético; Adei Montiel; Pedro Cobo; Asier Martínez; Jorge Illarramendi	40.96	Cueva de Nerja-UMA; Darío Bruzón; José María Marvizón; Jesús Gómez Villadiego; José Miguel Millán	40.98
4 × 400 m relay	Real Sociedad de Atletismo; Adrián Rocandio; Unai Mena; Ibai Serrano; Gen Esteban San Millán	3:12.55	C.A. Fent Camí Mislata; Joan Albert Micó; Alejandro Estévez; Iñaki López Pascual; Eliam Fernández	3:14.31	Atletismo Numantino; Alberto Montero Rodríguez; Pablo Fernández López-Gavela; Saúl Martínez Moreno; Manuel Olmedo	3:15.90

=== Women ===
Event	Gold		Silver		Bronze	
100 metres (wind: -0.2 m/s)	Paula Sevilla; Playas de Castellón	11.52	Jaël Bestué; F.C. Barcelona	11.61	Estela García; C.D. Nike Running	11.80
200 metres (wind: -1.2 m/s)	Jaël Bestué; F.C. Barcelona	23.60	Paula Sevilla; Playas de Castellón	23.67	Esther Navero; Playas de Castellón	24.59 PB
400 metres	Andrea Jiménez; Playas de Castellón	53.64	Carmen Avilés; Dep. Los Califas	54.32	Elena Moreno Huerta; Valencia C.A.	54.38
800 metres	Esther Guerrero; New Balance Team	2:06.23	Victoria Sauleda; Independent	2:06.71	Daniela García; Playas de Castellón	2:07.85
1500 metres	Esther Guerrero; New Balance Team	4:23.47	Solange Pereira; Valencia C.A.	4:25.39	Lucía Rodríguez Montero; C.D. Nike Running	4:26.98
5000 metres	Marta Pérez; C.A. Adidas	16:08.28	Maitane Melero; Grupompleo Pamplona At.	16:13.56	Carolina Robles; F.C. Barcelona	16:15.38 PB
100 m hurdles (wind: -1.1 m/s)	Elba Parmo; Alcampo Scorpio 71	13.68	Xenia Benach; Cornellá At.	13.87	María Múgica; Valencia C.A.	13.98
400 m hurdles	Sara Gallego; L'Hospitalet At.	57.17	Salma Paralluelo; Playas de Castellón	57.56	Nerea Bermejo; Grupompleo Pamplona At.	57.86 PB
3000 m s'chase	Irene Sánchez-Escribano; C.A. Adidas	9:48.57	Clara Viñaras; Playas de Castellón	9:58.30	Lidia Campo; Playas de Castellón	10:18.90 PB
10 km walk	Antia Chamosa; S.G. Pontevedra	48:35.20	Ainhoa Pinedo; Independent	48:49.43	Marina Sillero; At. Ianuarius Salamanca	49:10.72 PB
High jump	Cristina Ferrando; Playas de Castellón	1.87 m	Saleta Fernández; Valencia Esports	1.85 m	Izaskun Turrillas; Grupompleo Pamplona At.	1.81 m
Pole vault	Andrea San José; F.C. Barcelona	4.32 m	Malen Ruiz de Azúa; Valencia C.A.	4.22 m	Ana Carrasco García; F.C. Barcelona	4.17 m
Long jump	Juliet Itoya; F.C. Barcelona	6.37 m	Irati Mitxelena; At. San Sebastián	6.26 m	Laila Lacuey; Grupompleo Pamplona At.	6.23 m PB
Triple jump	Patricia Sarrapio; Playas de Castellón	13.67 m	Irati Mitxelena; At. San Sebastián	13.09 m	Osasere Eghosa; Piélagos	12.98 m
Shot put	María Belén Toimil; Playas de Castellón	16.20 m	Úrsula Ruiz; Valencia C.A.	16.11 m	Mónica Borraz; A.D. Marathon	14.95 m
Discus throw	Paula Ferrándiz; Playas de Castellón	50.64 m	June Kintana; Grupompleo Pamplona At.	49.73 m	Natalia Sáinz; Enrique de Osso	48.12 m PB
Hammer throw	Laura Redondo; F.C. Barcelona	68.12 m	Berta Castells; Valencia C.A.	64.75 m	Osarumen Odeh; Playas de Castellón	63.54 m
Javelin throw	Arantza Moreno; F.C. Barcelona	55.83 m	Carmen Sánchez Parrondo; Unicaja Jaén	45.24 m	Paula Rodríguez; Valencia C.A.	44.36 m
Heptathlon	Claudia Conte; Playas de Castellón	5891 pts CR	Carmen Ramos Vellón; Playas de Castellón	5804 pts	Patricia Ortega Trincado; At. San Sebastián	5459 pts
4 × 100 m relay	Club de Atletismo Playas de Castellón; África Radsma; Esther Navero; Paula Sevilla; Bianca Acosta	45.91	Pamplona Atlético; Yaiza Sanz; Nerea Bermejo; Martina Wiafe; Laila Lacuey	46.12	Las Celtíberas; Olga Macías; Wilvely Santana; Mara Arranz; Alba Lázaro	46.45
4 × 400 m relay	Club de Atletismo Playas de Castellón; Herminia Parra; Salma Paralluelo; Carla García; Andrea Jiménez	3:45.36	Club Atlético San Sebastián; Sara Gómez; Alazne Echebarría; Irati Zurutuza; Eliani Casi	3:48.78	Universidad de León; Alicia Recio; Lucía Juan; Clara Llamazares; Ángela García	3:50.90
