= Mister RNB España 2024 =

- Date: October 12, 2024
- Venue: Alannia Salou Hotel and Resort, Salou, Tarragona
- Broadcaster: YouTube
- Entrants: 44
- Winner: Pablo Herrera (Murcia)
- Congeniality: Xabier Ganuza (Navarra)
- Photogenic: José Guerra (Segovia)

Mister RNB España 2024 was the 4th Mister RNB España pageant. Álvaro Germes of Huesca, Rafael Domínguez of Gipuzkoa, Pedro Cordero of Málaga and Víctor Sánchez of Girona crowned their successors at the end of the event. The winners will represent Spain at the Mister Supranational 2025, Mister International 2025, and Mister Global 2025.

== Background ==
=== Location and date ===
On 14 August 2024, RNB España announced that Salou, Tarragona, on the tourist capital of Costa Daurada, will host Mister RNB España 2024 from Monday, October 7 to Saturday, October 12. During the week, all official representatives will participate in several activities and will enjoy various sights of Salou where the mayor of Salou, Pere Granados will welcome the representatives. The Finals will be held at the Alannia Salou Hotel and Resort on Saturday, October 12, at 09:00 p.m, with tickets to sell.

== Selection Committee ==
The following served as the panel of judges in selecting the best representatives to represent Spain in the international pageants:

- Magalí Benejam - Miss Universe Argentina 2024
- Kim Goodburn - Mister International 2023 from Thailand
- Elizabeth Laker - Miss España Supranational 2024

== Results ==
Color keys

- The contestant won in an International pageant.
- The contestant was a Finalist/Runner-up in an International pageant.
- The contestant was a Semi-Finalist in an International pageant.
- The contestant did not place.

=== Placements ===
Mister RNB España 🇪🇸 2024 finals was held in Salou via RNB España official YouTube channel on October 12, 2024.

Final results	Contestant	Ref.	International Placement
Mister RNB España Supranational	Murcia – Pablo Herrera		Top 20; Mister Supranational 2025
Mister RNB España Internacional	Ciudad Real – Christian Losana Δ		Top 20; Mister International 2025
Mister RNB España Global	Valencia – Alejandro Ortega		Winner; Mister Global 2025
1st Runner-Up	Cantabria – Alberto García		
2nd Runner-Up	Gipuzkoa – Unai Sarobe Δ		
3rd Runner-Up	Madrid – Francisco Cáceres		
Top 12	Burgos – Abdoulaye Sarr Δ; Cádiz – Isaac Serrano Δ; Jaén – Eduardo Chica; Las Palmas – Pablo Gonzalez Δ; Navarra – Xabier Ganuza §; Tarragona – Miguel Morato		
Top 24	A Coruña – Aarón Lorenzo; Alicante – Sergio Soler; Albacete - Jaime Narváez; Ávila – Alberto Cano Δ; Barcelona – Marius Hontau; Biscay – Asier Pereda; Córdoba, Spain|name=Córdoba – Nicolás Fortes; Cuenca – Javier Gálvez; Lleida – Edgar De Sande; Málaga – Miguel Molina; Segovia – José Guerra; Zamora – Diego Ruiz		

§ – placed into the Top 12 as the From The Ground Up challenge winner

Δ – placed into the Top 24 by fast-track challenges

=== Special awards ===
Final Results		Winner	Ref.	Finalists	Ref.
PRUEBAS CLASIFICATORIAS (Fast-track)	From The Ground Up (From The Ground Up)	Navarra – Xabier Ganuza		Ávila - Alberto Cano; Lleida - Edgar De Sande; Murcia - Pablo Herrera; Valladolid - Xavi Revilla	
PRUEBAS CLASIFICATORIAS (Fast-track)	Top Model (Top Model)	Burgos – Abdoulaye Sarr		Alicante - Sergio Soler; Cantabria – Alberto García; Ciudad Real – Christian Losana; Córdoba, Spain|name=Córdoba - Nicolás Fortes; Gipuzkoa – Unai Sarobe; Jaén - Eduardo Chica; Las Palmas – Pablo Gonzalez; Madrid – Francisco Cáceres; Málaga - Miguel Molina; Melilla - Alejandro Luna; Murcia - Pablo Herrera; Tarragona - Miguel Morato; Toledo - Pablo Lorenzo; Valencia - Alejandro Ortega	
PRUEBAS CLASIFICATORIAS (Fast-track)	Mejor Cuerpo (Best Body)	Las Palmas – Pablo Gonzalez		Alicante - Sergio Soler; Araba - Iker Bertaud-Neiraud; Barcelona - Marius Hontau; Biscay - Asier Pereda; Burgos - Abdoulaye Sarr; Cádiz - Isaac Serrano; Castellón - Salvador Leiva; Ceuta - José Manuel Árbol; Ciudad Real – Christian Losana; Gipuzkoa – Unai Sarobe; Huesca - Alassane Thioucoury; Murcia - Pablo Herrera; Segovia – José Guerra; Tarragona - Miguel Morato	
PRUEBAS CLASIFICATORIAS (Fast-track)	Multimedia (Multimedia)	Ávila – Alberto Cano		Jaén - Eduardo Chica; Madrid – Francisco Cáceres; Málaga - Miguel Molina; Murcia - Pablo Herrera; Palencia - Rubén Merino; Toledo - Pablo Lorenzo	
PRUEBAS CLASIFICATORIAS (Fast-track)	Turismo Salou (Tourism – Salou)	Gipuzkoa – Unai Sarobe			
PRUEBAS CLASIFICATORIAS (Fast-track)	Turismo Alannia (Tourism – Alannia)	Cádiz - Isaac Serrano			
PREMIOS ESPECIALES (Special Awards)	Elegancia (Elegance)	Cantabria – Alberto García			
PREMIOS ESPECIALES (Special Awards)	Mejor Cabello (Best Hair)	Cuenca – Javier Gálvez			
PREMIOS ESPECIALES (Special Awards)	Mejor Rostro (Best Face)	Madrid – Francisco Cáceres			
PREMIOS ESPECIALES (Special Awards)	Simpatia (Congeniality)	Navarra – Xabier Ganuza			
PREMIOS ESPECIALES (Special Awards)	Fotogenia (Photogenic)	Segovia – José Guerra			
PREMIOS PATROCINADORES (Sponsors Awards)	Mario Merin Photography	Gipuzkoa – Unai Sarobe			
PREMIOS PATROCINADORES (Sponsors Awards)	Mister Aesthetic Dr. Gianluca Mastrocola	Valencia – Alejandro Ortega			
PREMIOS PATROCINADORES (Sponsors Awards)	Stefano Hombre Torrelavega	Murcia – Pablo Herrera			
PREMIOS PATROCINADORES (Sponsors Awards)	Alfa Male Active Wear	Las Palmas – Pablo Gonzalez			
PAGINAS ESPECIALIZADAS (Specialized Pages)	Missosologists' Choice	Ciudad Real – Christian Losana			
PAGINAS ESPECIALIZADAS (Specialized Pages)	Mundo De Misters	Ciudad Real – Christian Losana			
PAGINAS ESPECIALIZADAS (Specialized Pages)	Missotopia	Ciudad Real – Christian Losana			
PAGINAS ESPECIALIZADAS (Specialized Pages)	Misterologo	Ciudad Real – Christian Losana			

== Official delegates ==
Forty-four confirmed delegates that will represent their provinces for the titles.

Province	Candidate	Age (Note: Ages at the time of the pageant)	Ref.
A Coruña	Aarón Lorenzo	28	
Albacete	Jaime Narváez	33	
Alicante	Sergio Soler	24	
Álava	Iker Bertaud-Neiraud	20	
Asturias	Iván Ardines	34	
Ávila	Alberto Cano	35	
Barcelona	Marius Hontau	31	
Biscay	Asier Pereda	36	
Burgos	Abdoulaye Sarr	21	
Cáceres	Iker Basterrechea	21	
Cádiz	Isaac Serrano	32	
Cantabria	Alberto García	19	
Castellón	Salvador Leiva	29	
Ceuta	José Manuel Árbol	26	
Ciudad Real	Christian Losana	24	
name=Córdoba	Nicolás Fortes	20	
Cuenca	Javier Gálvez	27	
Gipuzkoa	Unai Sarobe	35	
Girona	Alejandro Villaescusa	27	
Granada	Daniel Díaz	25	
Guadalajara	Yoan Almenares	26	
Huesca	Alassane Thioucoury	28	
Jaén	Eduardo Chica	26	
La Rioja	Ander Fernández	19	
Las Palmas	Pablo Gonzalez	23	
Lleida	Edgar De Sande	29	
Lugo	Cristian Rodríguez	28	
Madrid	Francisco Cáceres	22	
Málaga	Miguel Molina	22	
Melilla	Alejandro Luna	20	
Murcia	Pablo Herrera	33	
Navarra	Xabier Ganuza	26	
Ourense	Carlos Pastoriza	30	
Palencia	Rubén Merino	20	
Segovia	José Guerra	23	
Soria	Eduard Peter	21	
Tarragona	Miguel Morato	29	
Tenerife	Acorán Pérez	19	
Teruel	David Marqués	28	
Toledo	Pablo Lorenzo	23	
Valencia	Alejandro Ortega	25	
Valladolid	Xavi Revilla	26	
Zamora	Diego Ruiz	32	
Zaragoza	David Belenguer	25	
