= Caballero Universal 2022 =

2nd Caballero Universal competition, international male beauty pageant edition

- Date: December 1, 2022
- Venue: Teatro Luisela Diaz, Caracas, Venezuela
- Entrants: 14
- Placements: 10
- Debuts: Bolivia; India; Nicaragua; Panama; Philippines; United States
- Withdrawals: Brazil; Ecuador; French Guiana; Italy; Peru
- Winner: Kendall Jo Switzenberg; United States

Caballero Universal 2022 is the second edition of the Venezuela-based international male beauty pageant Caballero Universal. The pageant took place at the Teatro Luisela Díaz in Caracas, Venezuela, on December 1, 2022.

Cristhian Naranjo of Spain crowned Kendall Switzenberg of the United States as his successor at the end of the event.

== Results ==
Placements	Contestant	Ref.
Caballero Universal 2022	United States – Kendall Jo Switzenberg	
Vice King Caballero Universal 2022	Nicaragua – Carlos Palacios	
1st Prince	Spain – Pablo Estrada	
2nd Prince	India – Kramikkumar Yadav	
3rd Prince	Puerto Rico – Ángel Rosado	
4th Prince	Cuba – Roger Molina	
Top 10	Dominican Republic – Fabio Gómez; Mexico - Loui Olivera; Panama – Israel Guerra; Philippines – Andre John Cue	

=== Special awards ===
Award	Contestant	Ref.
Mister Elegancia (Most Elegant)	India – Kramik Yadav	
Mister Fotografico (Most Photogenic)	Cuba – Roger Molina	
Mister Interactivo (Interactive Gentleman)	Spain – Pablo Estrada	
Mister Pasarela (Best in Catwalk)	Nicaragua – Carlos Palacios	
Mister Prensa (Press Gentleman)	United States – Kendall Jo Switzenberg	
Mister Simpatia (Most Friendly)	Haiti – Juan Jiménez	
Mejor Cuerpo (Best Body)	Philippines – Andre John Cue	
Mejor Sonrisa (Best Smile)	Dominican Republic – Fabio Gómez	

== Candidates ==
Fifteen confirmed candidates had competed for the title.

Country	Contestant	Age (Note: Ages at the time of the pageant)	Height	Hometown	Ref.
Bolivia	Mauricio Pastrán	30	1.82 m (5 ft 11 1/2 in)	Santa Cruz	
Colombia	Janner Feria	26	TBD	Sincelejo	
Cuba	Roger Molina	26	TBD	Santiago de Cuba	
Dominican Republic	Fabio Gómez	19	TBD	La Vega	
Haiti	Juan Ramón Matin Jiménez	27	TBD	Port-au-Prince	
India	Kramik Yadav	28	1.85 m (6 ft 1 in)	Ahmedabad	
Mexico	Loui Olivera	28	1.86 m (6 ft 1 in)	Barinas	
Nicaragua	Carlos Palacios	18	1.80 m (5 ft 11 in)	Bluefields	
Panama	Israel Guerra	22	TBD	Chiriquí	
Philippines	Andre John Cue	19	1.75 m (5 ft 9 in)	Cagayan de Oro	
Puerto Rico	Ángel Rosado	27	TBD	Ponce	
Spain	Pablo Estrada	32	2.00 m (6 ft 6 1/2 in)	Madrid	
United States	Kendall Jo Switzenberg	26	1.80 m (5 ft 11 in)	Lubbock	
Venezuela	Joseph Daniel Pérez	26	TBD	Los Teques	
