= Missosology =

International beauty pageant publication and online community

- Formation: 1999
- Founder: Ric Galvez; Nicholo Paulo "Pawee" Ventura
- Type: Online beauty pageant publication
- Headquarters: Manila, Philippines
- Region served: International
- Services: Beauty pageant coverage, analysis, predictions and rankings

Missosology is an international beauty pageant publication and online community founded in 1999 by Ric Galvez and Pawee Ventura. It covers national and international beauty pageants through news, analysis, interviews, predictions and rankings. The organization is also known for its Hot Picks and Timeless Beauty rankings, which feature contestants from major international beauty pageants.

The winner of Missosology's Timeless Beauty 2024 was Miss World 2023 Krystyna Pyszková of the Czech Republic.

== History ==
Missosology was founded in 1999 by Ric Galvez and Pawee Ventura, according to a 2014 report published by The Philippine Star

In a 2013 interview with Rappler, Pawee Ventura described Missosology as an international beauty pageant forum founded by Ric Galvez, which began as a personal webpage containing essays about the Miss Universe 1994 pageant. Ventura discussed the site's expansion into international communities, its coverage of major beauty pageants and its volunteer-based membership. The interview also described Missosology's plans at the time to organize its own international pageant and establish a beauty training school.

The publication developed as an online platform for the discussion and coverage of national and international beauty pageants. In 2014, The Philippine Star described Missosology as an online pageant magazine and portal, reporting that it had attracted millions of page views and visitors from several countries.

The organization developed as an online community devoted to the analysis and coverage of international beauty pageants. A 2014 article in Kaieteur News described its activities as including interviews with contestants, pageant predictions, commentary and coverage of major international competitions, including Miss Universe, Miss World, Miss International and Miss Earth.

In November 2013, International Business Times Australia published an interview with Ventura concerning the development of Missosology, its international activities and plans for future expansion.

It has also been covered in reporting about the Philippine pageant industry. An Agence France-Presse report published by The Philippine Star in 2019 identified Ric Galvez as the overall coordinator of Missosology.org in its coverage of the Philippine pageant industry.

In a report examining the Philippine's prominence in international beauty pageants, the South China Morning Post quoted Ric Galvez, identified as the overall coordinator of Missosology.org, discussing the cultural significance of beauty pageants in the country and the influence of beauty queens on public discourse. Galvez said that Filipinos looked to beauty queens for guidance on matters of national relevance.

== Activities ==
Missosology publishes coverage, analysis and predictions concerning international beauty pageants. Its activities have included interviews with contestants, commentary on pageant competitions and rankings of national representatives.

Its rankings and predictions have also received coverage from international media outlets. In 2017, Vietnam's Voice of Vietnam reported on the organization's Timeless Beauty rankings, which assessed contestants from several major international pageants.

The Timeless Beauty recognition continued in subsequent years, with VOV reporting on its 2023 and 2024 editions.

== Organization ==
Missosology has been associated with pageant training and international beauty competitions. In April 2014, The Philippine Star identified Pawee Ventura as a co-owner of Missosology and reported on her involvement in training beauty contestants from Myanmar.

A separate report published by The Philippine Star in August 2014 identified Ventura as the founder of Missosology Organization in 1999 and described the organization as an online pageant magazine and portal.

== Timeless Beauty ==
Missosology organizes the annual Timeless Beauty award, which recognizes contestants from major international beauty pageants. The award was launched in 2004, with annual selections conducted since 2010. Candidates are selected from major international competitions, including Miss World, Miss Universe, Miss International, Miss Earth and Miss Supranational. A panel of judges evaluates contestants based on their appearance, performance in their respective competitions and overall impact.

=== Titleholders ===
Year	Timeless Beauty	Country/Territory	Represented	Ref.
2010	Maria Venus Raj	Philippines	Miss Universe 2010	
2011	Olesya Stefanko	Ukraine	Miss Universe 2011	
2012	Irene Esser	Venezuela	Miss Universe 2012	
2013	Marine Lorphelin	France	Miss World 2013	
2014	Paulina Vega	Colombia	Miss Universe 2014	
2015	Edymar Martínez	Venezuela	Miss International 2015	
2016	Catriona Gray	Philippines	Miss World 2016	
2017	Demi-Leigh Nel-Peters	South Africa	Miss Universe 2017	
2018	H'Hen Niê	Vietnam	Miss Universe 2018	
2019	Evelyn Namatovu Karonde	Uganda	Miss International 2019	
2020	Lindsey Coffey	United States	Miss Earth 2020	
2021	Chanique Rabe	Namibia	Miss Supranational 2021	
2022	Gabriëla Dos Santos	Curaçao	Miss Universe 2022	
2023	Anntonia Porsild	Thailand	Miss Universe 2023	
2024	Krystyna Pyszková	Czech Republic	Miss World 2023	

=== Final rankings ===
Year	Winner	Runners-up				Ref.
Year	Winner	First	Second	Third	Fourth	Ref.
2018	H'Hen Niê; Vietnam	Mariem Velazco; Venezuela	Tamaryn Green; South Africa	Telma Madeira; Portugal	Ahtisa Manalo; Philippines	
2020	Lindsey Coffey; United States	Adline Castelino; India	Janick Maceta; Peru	Andrea Meza; Mexico	Amanda Obdam; Thailand	
2022	Gabriëla Dos Santos; Curaçao	Karolina Bielawska; Poland	Jasmin Selberg; Germany	R'Bonney Gabriel; United States	Amanda Dudamel; Venezuela	
2023	Anntonia Porsild; Thailand	Drita Ziri; Albania	Michelle Dee; Philippines	Diana Silva; Venezuela	Andrea Rubio; Venezuela	
2024	Krystyna Pyszková; Czech Republic	Victoria Kjær Theilvig; Denmark	Ileana Márquez; Venezuela	Alina Dementjeva; Lithuania	Chidimma Adetshina; Nigeria	

=== Countries/territories by number of wins ===
Country/Territory	Titles	Year(s)
Philippines	2	2010, 2016
Venezuela	2	2012, 2015
United States	1	2020
Ukraine	1	2011
France	1	2013
Colombia	1	2014
South Africa	1	2017
Vietnam	1	2018
Uganda	1	2019
Namibia	1	2021
Curaçao	1	2022
Thailand	1	2023
Czech Republic	1	2024

== Media coverage and recognition ==
The South China Morning Post also referenced an interview published by Missosology following the Miss Universe 2015 pageant, in which Miss Germany Sarah-Lorraine Riek discussed the controversy surrounding the announcement of the winner.

In July 2010, the South Korean newspaper Chosun Ilbo reported that Kim Joo-ri, Miss Korea 2009, had ranked seventh in an international popularity poll ahead of Miss Universe 2010. The report identified Missosology.org as the website hosting the poll, which was open to participants worldwide.

In December 2012, the Spanish news agency Agencia EFE described Missosology as a specialized beauty pageant website in its coverage of the Miss Universe 2012 competition. The report cited the website's predictions, which identified five contestants as leading favorites for the title.

Missosology's pageant predictions, rankings and commentary have been featured by Philippine media outlets, including GMA News and ABS-CBN News. In February 2016, ABS-CBN News published an interview with Missosology founder Pawee Ventura, who discussed her predictions concerning Pia Wurtzbach's reign as Miss Universe.

In January 2017, GMA Public Affairs featured Ventura in a post-pageant discussion on Unang Hirit, alongside former Miss Universe third runner-up Ariella Arida. ABS-CBN News also featured Missosology's predictions ahead of the 65th Miss Universe competition that year.

The organization's predictions for Philippine pageants have also been reported by GMA News Online. In May 2023, the publication covered Missosology's final predictions for Miss Universe Philippines 2023. In May 2025, GMA News reported on its final predictions for Miss Universe Philippines 2025, naming Ahtisa Manalo as its top pick. In July 2026, the publication covered its final predictions for Binibining Pilipinas 2026, in which Sasha Lacuna of Tarlac topped the rankings.

International media have also covered the organization's rankings and awards. Vietnam's Voice of Vietnam reported on Missosology's Timeless Beauty rankings, including its 2017 edition and subsequent annual selections.

In December 2015, The Washington Post referred to Missosology as a pageant blog when reporting on an interview with Miss Germany Sarah-Lorraine Riek that had been published on the organization's YouTube and Facebook accounts following the Miss Universe 2015 pageant. The same month, The Straits Times described Missosology as an online beauty pageant magazine in its report about video footage of the aftermath of the pageant's final results announcement. The newspaper reported that the footage had been posted on Missosology's Facebook page and had attracted millions of views and thousands of comments.

In a 2018 feature examining beauty pageant culture in the Philippines, BBC News Chinese described Missosology as a well-known beauty pageant forum website founded by Filipinos.

In December 2022, Chosun Online described Missosology as an international beauty pageant-related website in an article about Miss International 2022 winner Jasmin Selberg of Germany. The article reported that Missosology had featured a photograph of Selberg and her Korean boyfriend on its official social-media account.

Latin Times also referenced Missosology's social-media coverage in its reporting on Miss Universe 2024, embedding a video from the organization's official TikTok account presenting the competition's new crown.

The Philippine Daily Inquirer has also reported on Missosology's pageant predictions and rankings. In November 2024, Daily Inquirer reported that the organization included Philippine representative Chelsea Manalo among its final Hot Picks for Miss Universe 2024. The publication subsequently covered Missosology's predictions for Miss Universe Philippines 2026 and Miss Earth 2025.

In November 2025, CNN featured Ric Galvez, founder of Missosology, in a report examining the Philippines' prominence in international beauty pageants. Galvez discussed the historical roots of pageantry in the country, including its possible connections to Spanish colonial-era, religious festivities and the Santacruzan tradition.

== See also ==
- List of beauty pageants
- Big Four beauty pageants
