= Caballero Universal =

International male beauty pageant

- Formation: 2021
- Type: Male beauty pageant
- Headquarters: Caracas
- Location: Venezuela
- Official language: Spanish
- Founder: Rafael Enrique Ramírez Montes (Raenrra)
- Current titleholder: Garth Ezekiel Talusig; Philippines
- Most recent edition: 2026

Caballero Universal is an international male beauty pageant held in Venezuela. Established in 2021, the competition brings together male representatives from different countries to participate in events involving modelling, sports, public speaking and cultural activities. The pageant was founded by Venezuelan fashion designer Rafael Enrique Ramírez Montes, professionally known as Raenrra.

The competition is organised under the direction of Ramírez and has been staged in several Venezuelan locations, including Caracas and Margarita Island. Its programme has included modelling presentations, athletic challenges, interviews, public-speaking activities and cultural presentations.

The current titleholder of Caballero Universal is Garth Ezekiel Talusig from Philippines, who was crowned by the former titleholder, Franco Daniel Cova of Venezuela, on November 17, 2026, at Teatro Junín in Caracas, Venezuela. He made history as the first Filipino, Asian and Kalinga native to win the Caballero Universal title.

== History ==
Caballero Universal was established in 2021 as an international male beauty competition based in Venezuela. The inaugural edition was held on Margarita Island in December 2021, with contestants representing different countries. Spanish representative Cristhian Naranjo Gómez was the inaugural titleholder.

The second edition took place in Caracas in December 2022. The event was directed by Ramírez, with the participation and support of Venezuelan beauty-pageant personality Osmel Sousa. The competition included sporting activities, modelling presentations, public speaking and photography sessions. Kendall Jo Switzenberg of the United States won the title, while Puerto Rican contestant Ángel Rosado placed among the finalists.

In 2023, the third edition was held in Caracas and brought together 20 contestants. The programme included activities in Caracas and Margarita Island, with sporting competitions, modelling, public speaking and photography. Leandro Mendoza of the Dominican Republic won the title, while Puerto Rican representative Enrique Alejandro Díaz finished as the first runner-up.

The fourth edition was held in October 2024 in Caracas. Canadian representative Jeremy Ste-Marie won the title, succeeding Mendoza. The competition continued its international format, bringing together contestants from different countries.

The fifth edition was held on 11 October 2025 at the Teatro Nacional de Caracas. Twenty-four contestants participated in the competition. Venezuelan representative Franco Daniel Cova won the title, becoming the first Venezuelan to hold the international title. Israel Jesús da Silva of Brazil was named Vice Caballero Universal, while Luca Scandolara of Italy, Anantha Krishna of India, Marnny Lampa of the Philippines and Luis Fernández Dávila of Peru completed the leading placements.

The sixth edition was scheduled to take place in November 2026 in Caracas. The event was promoted in partnership with Venezuelan television channel Canal i, which announced plans to broadcast the final. The programme included sporting challenges, fashion presentations, interviews and tourism activities for the international contestants. At the end of the event Garth Ezekiel Talusig from Philippines, was crowned by the former titleholder, Franco Daniel Cova of Venezuela, on November 17, 2026, at Teatro Junín in Caracas, Venezuela. He made history as the first Filipino, Asian and Kalinga native to win the Caballero Universal title.

=== Competition ===
Caballero Universal features contestants representing countries and territories from different parts of the world. The competition incorporates various activities designed to evaluate the participants' modelling abilities, physical fitness, communication skills and overall presentation. These include runway presentations, sporting and physical challenges, public-speaking and interview sessions, photography competitions, and cultural and tourism-related activities. During the 2025 edition, contestants participated in preliminary competitions and special-award categories before advancing through successive finalist rounds, culminating in the announcement of the final placements.

== Titleholders ==
Edition	Year	Caballero Universal	Virrey Caballero Universal	1st Prince	2nd Prince	3rd Prince	4th Prince	Location/Venue	Entrants	Ref.
1st	2021	Cristhian Naranjo Gómez; Spain	Luis Bermúdez; Venezuela	Enmanuel Peña; Dominican Republic	Kevin John; French Guiana	Wilson Andrés Cárdenas Carrillo; Ecuador	Ronald Mayorga Peixoto; Peru	Hotel Venetur Margarita in Porlamar, Nueva Esparta, Margarita Island, Venezuela	16	
2nd	2022	Kendall Jo Switzenberg; United States	Carlos Palacios; Nicaragua	Pablo Estrada; Spain	Kramikkumar Yadav; India	Ángel Rosado; Puerto Rico	Roger Molina; Cuba	Teatro Luisela Díaz, Caracas, Venezuela	15	
3rd	2023	Leandro Mendoza; Dominican Republic	Ailton Rodrigues de Oliveira; Brazil	Enrique Alejandro Díaz; Puerto Rico	Gabriel Bastidas; Venezuela	José Luis Cera; Mexico	Daniel Rodríguez Chopite; Canada	Pestana Caracas Hotel, Caracas, Venezuela	20	
4th	2024	Jeremy Ste-Marie; Canada	César Aguilera; Venezuela	Niellsen de Almeida; Brazil	Adithya Subramanian; India	Mauricio de Jesús Barraza; El Salvador	Javier Alejandro García; Cuba	Salon Venezuela of Circulo Militar, Caracas, Venezuela	21	
5th	2025	Franco Daniel Cova; Venezuela	Israel Jesús da Silva; Brazil	Luca Scandolara; Italy	Anantha Krishna; India	Marnny Lampa; Philippines	Luis Fernández Dávila; Peru	Teatro Nacional de Caracas, Caracas, Venezuela	24	
6th	2026	Garth Ezekiel Talusig; Philippines	Alex Temitope Adetuwo; Nigeria	Cristian Mandujano; Mexico	Daniel Villasmil; Venezuela	Merval Azevedo; Brazil	Jorge Eduardo Arandia Terceros; Bolivia	Teatro Junín, Caracas, Venezuela	18	

=== Countries/territories by number of wins ===
Caballero Universal

Country/Territory	Titles	Year(s)
Spain	1	2021
United States	1	2022
Dominican Republic	1	2023
Canada	1	2024
Venezuela	1	2025
Philippines	1	2026

Virrey Caballero Universal

Country/Territory	Titles	Year(s)
Venezuela	2	2021, 2024
Brazil	2	2023, 2025
Nicaragua	1	2022
Nigeria	1	2026

== See also ==
- List of beauty pageants
- Mister International
- Mister World
- Mister Supranational
