= Odei Jainaga =

Spanish javelin thrower

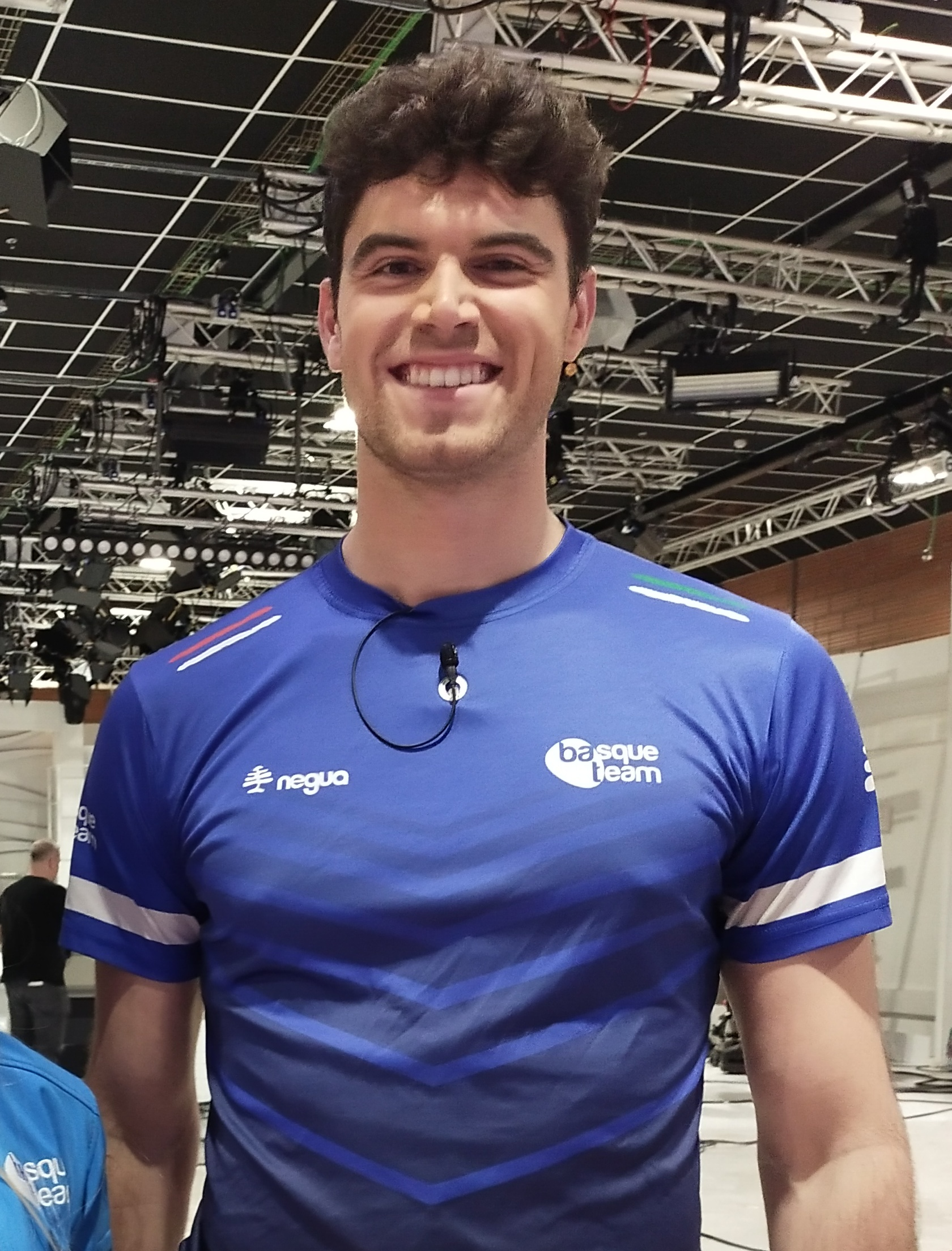

Personal information
- Full name: Odei Jainaga Larrea
- Nationality: Spanish
- Born: 14 October 1997 (age 28) Eibar, Spain
- Height: 1.96 m (6 ft 5 in)
- Weight: 100 kg (220 lb)

Sport
- Sport: Athletics
- Event: Javelin throw
- Club: Real Sociedad
- Coached by: Jose Antonio Garcia Feijoo

Odei Jainaga Larrea (born 14 October 1997) is a Spanish athlete and model specializing in the javelin throw. He represented Spain at the 2020 Summer Olympics in the javelin throw. He is the Spanish national record holder in the javelin throw.

== Career ==
On 12 September 2020, Jainaga set the championship record at the 2020 Spanish Athletics Championships with a distance of 83.51 m and won a gold medal.

On 29 May 2021, Jainaga set the Spanish national record in the javelin throw at the 2021 European Athletics Team Championships Super League with a distance of 84.80 m.

Jainaga represented Spain at the 2020 Summer Olympics in the javelin throw.

== Personal life ==
Jainaga's mother, Cristina Larrea, was a Spanish national javelin champion in 1992, 1993 and 1994.

== International competitions ==
Year	Competition	Venue	Position	Event	Notes
Representing Spain
2016	World U20 Championships	Bydgoszcz, Poland	34th (q)	Javelin throw	63.63 m
2017	European U23 Championships	Bydgoszcz, Poland	15th (q)	Javelin throw	69.07 m
2018	Mediterranean Games	Tarragona, Spain	8th	Javelin throw	63.51 m
2021	European Athletics Team Championships	Chorzów, Poland	3rd	Javelin throw	84.80 m NR
2021	Olympic Games	Tokyo, Japan	29th (q)	Javelin throw	73.11 m
