= Periana =

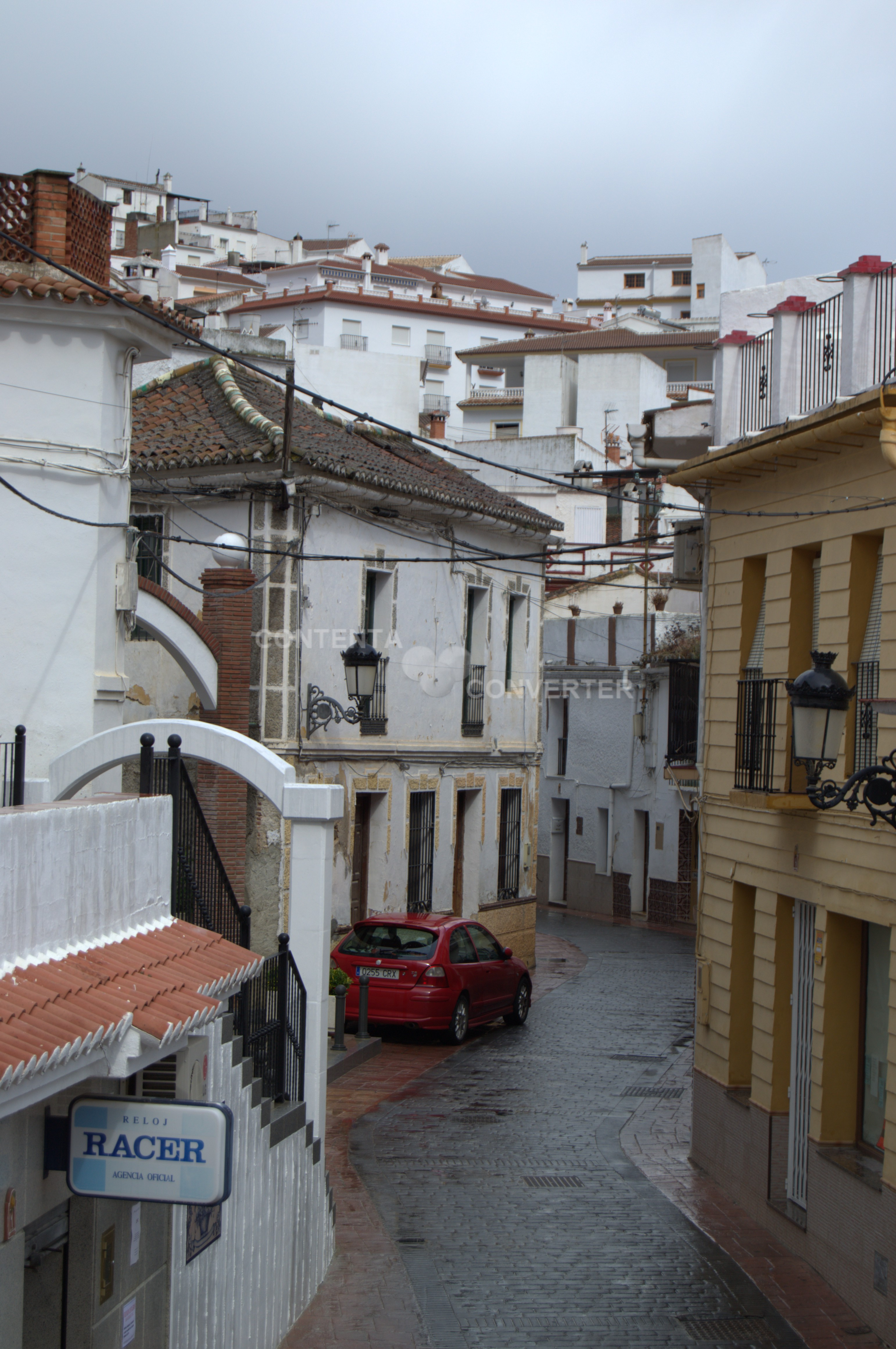

- Coat of arms

- Location in Spain.
- Coordinates: 36°55′N 4°12′W
- Sovereign state: Spain
- Autonomous community: Andalusia
- Province: Málaga

Area
  - Total: 58.76 km^{2} (22.69 sq mi)
- Elevation: 550 m (1,800 ft)

Population (2025-01-01)
  - Total: 3,367
  - Density: 57.30/km^{2} (148.4/sq mi)
- Time zone: UTC+1 (CET)
  - Summer (DST): UTC+2 (CEST)
- Website: www.periana.es

Periana is a town and municipality in the province of Málaga, part of the autonomous community of Andalusia in southern Spain. It belongs to the comarca of La Axarquía. The municipality is situated approximately 23 kilometres from Vélez and 48 from the provincial capital of Málaga near the Sierra de Alhama. It has a population of approximately 3,500 residents. The natives are called Perianenses and their nickname is Los Manga Anchas or “The Wide-sleeved Ones”.

During the Andalusian earthquake of 25 December 1884, 57% of houses collapsed completely and the rest suffered very serious damage. In total there were 44 dead and 32 seriously injured. In the annexes of La Muela, Guaro, Vilo, Mondrón, Sara, Marines, Rosas, Malpelo, Carrasquilla and Rioseco there were 190 collapsed houses and 171 badly damaged. There were 14 dead and 81 injured.

== See also ==
- List of municipalities in Málaga
