= List of firsts in the Philippines =

The following is the list of firsts in the Philippines.

In order to be listed, each feat must be backed up by a third-party reliable source explicitly stating that the feat is the first. Corporate milestones, such as the first branch or property of a particular company in the Philippines, are excluded, unless it is also a first in its industry.

== Architecture and engineering ==
The following are the first buildings or structures of their type.

=== Religious buildings ===
- First mosque: Masjid Sheikh Makhdum in Simunul, Tawi-Tawi – 1380
- First Catholic church: Basilica del Santo Niño – 1735
- First synagogue: Temple Emil in Taft Avenue, Malate, Manila – 1922
- First steel building church: San Sebastian Church – 1888

=== Hotels and restaurants ===
- First luxury hotel: Hotel del Oriente in Binondo, Manila – 1889

=== Shopping malls ===
- First department store: Hoskyn's Department Store in Iloilo City – 1877

=== Building certifications ===
- First LEED Platinum certified building: Zuellig Building in Makati City – awarded in 2013

=== Education buildings ===
- First 24-hour public library building: Cebu City Public Library in Cebu City – started their operations in 2018

=== Transportation buildings ===
- First elevated railway stations: LRT Line 1 stations from Baclaran Station to United Nations Station in Pasay City and Manila – December 1, 1984
- First depressed railway station: Buendia Station of the MRT Line 3 in Makati City – December 15, 1999
- First underground railway station: Katipunan Station of the LRT Line 2 in Quezon City – April 5, 2003
- First landport: Parañaque Integrated Terminal Exchange in Parañaque City – November 5, 2018

=== Roads and bridges ===
- First steel bridge: Ayala Bridge in Manila – 1908 (Note: First built in 1872 as a wooden bridge. Reconstructed as a steel bridge in 1908.)
- First concrete bridge and road: Forbes Bridge and Luna Street in Iloilo City – 1910
- First toll road: North Luzon Expressway from Balintawak, Quezon City to Guiguinto, Bulacan – August 4, 1968. Formerly known as North Diversion Road.
- First double-decked highway: the Metro Manila Skyway Stage 3 – January 14, 2021
- First grade-separated highway: the Metro Manila Skyway Stage 1 – December 10, 1998
- First bike lane network: Marikina Bikeways Project in Marikina City – July 22, 2001
- First protected bike lane along a national highway: at the Laguna Lake Highway in Taguig City – February 7, 2019
- First traffic light intersection: Plaza Goiti (Plaza Lacson) in Manila – 1920s
- First wire-cable suspension bridge: Puente Colgante Bridge in Manila – constructed in 1852 and replaced by the Quezon Bridge in 1939

=== Other ===
- First installed elevator: at the Burke Building
- First installed escalator: at the Manila International Airport – building built in 1961
- First installed air conditioning system in an office: at the Quezon Executive Office in Malacañang Palace – under the supervision of Mr. A.D. Williams on May 27, 1936
- First installed air conditioning system in a public structure: at the Crystal Arcade in Escolta, Manila – building built in 1932
- First installed air conditioning system in a hotel: at the Manila Hotel in along Manila Bay – building built on July 4, 1912
- First installed air conditioning system in a mall: at the Ali Mall in Cubao, Quezon City – building opened to the public on June 30, 1976
- First installed intercom system in a public structure: at the Manila Hotel in along Manila Bay – building built on July 4, 1912
- First luxury box: Premier Suites at the Mall of Asia Arena

== Beauty pageants and modelling ==
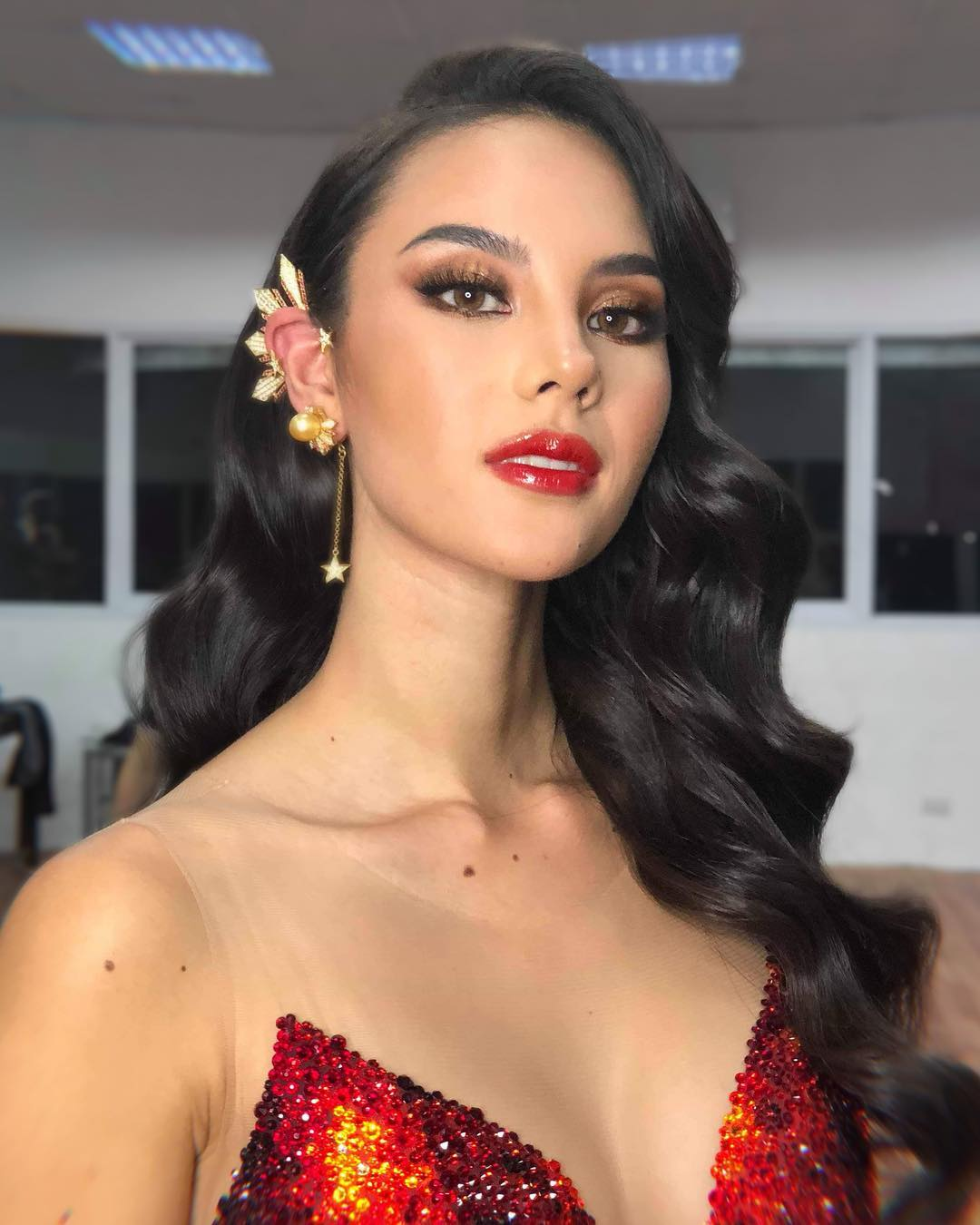
Catriona Gray, Miss Universe 2018.

=== Big Four pageants ===
- First Filipino Miss World: Megan Young (2013)
- First Filipino Miss Universe: Gloria Diaz (1969)
- First Filipino Miss International: Gemma Cruz (1964)
- First Filipino Miss Earth: Karla Henry (2008)
- First Filipino to represent the country more than two Big Four pageant competitions: Catriona Gray (Miss World 2016 and Miss Universe 2018)
- First consecutive titles in Miss Earth: Jamie Herrell (2014) and Angelia Ong (2015)
- First Miss Universe hosted: 1974 in Manila
- First Miss Earth hosted: 2001 in Manila

=== Other pageants ===
- First Filipino Miss International Queen: Kevin Balot (2012)
- First Filipino Miss Supranational: Mutya Johanna Datul (2013)
- First Filipino Miss Heritage: Odessa Mae Tadaya (2014)
- First Filipino Miss Globe: Ann Lorraine Colis (2015)
- First Filipino Miss Scuba International: Cindy Pacia Madduma (2015)
- First Filipino Miss United Continents: Jeslyn Santos (2016)
- First Filipino Mrs. Grandma Universe: Agnes Jakosalem (2017)
- First Filipino Reina Hispanoamericana: Teresita Marquez (2017)
- First Filipino Miss Multinational: Sophia Senoron (2017)
- First Filipino Miss Eco International: Cynthia Thomalla (2018)
- First Filipino Miss Summer World: Kaycee Coleen Lim (2018)
- First Filipino Miss Landscape International: Karen Grace Atienza (2018)
- First Filipino Miss Tourism Worldwide: Zara Carbonell (2018)
- First Filipino Miss Intercontinental: Karen Gallman (2018)
- First Filipino Miss Tourism World Intercontinental: Francesca Taruc (2019)
- First Filipino Noble Queen of the Universe: Patricia Javier (2019)
- First Filipino Miss Trans Global: Mela Franco Habijan (2020)
- First Filipino Miss Eco Teen International: Roberta Tamondong (2020)
- First Filipino Miss Aura International: Alexandra Faith Garcia (2021)
- First Filipino Miss Culture International: Samela Aubrey Godin (2021)
- First Filipino Miss Interglobal: Miriam Damoah (2021)
- First Filipino Miss Summit International: Nica Zosa (2022)
- First Filipino Reina Internacional del Cacao: Jerelleen Rodriguez (2022)
- First Filipino Miss Global: Shane Tormes (2022)
- First Filipino Miss CosmoWorld: Meiji Cruz (2022)
- First Filipino Miss Planet International: Maria Luisa Varela (2023)
- First Filipino Miss Chinese World: Annie Uson Chen (2023)
- First Filipino Miss Environment International: Shannon Robinson (2023)
- First Filipino Manhunt International: June Macasaet (2012)
- First Filipino Mister International: Neil Perez (2014)
- First Filipino Mr Gay World: John Raspado (2017)
- First Filipino Man of the World: Oliver Eugen Kretz (2026)
- First consecutive titles in Miss Asia Pacific International: Maria del Carmen Ines Zaragoza (1982) and Bong Dimayacyac (1983)
- First consecutive titles in Miss Tourism International: Rizzini Alexis Gomez (2012) and Angeli Dione Gomez (2013)
- First consecutive titles in Mr Gay World: John Jeffrey Carlos (2019), Leonard Kodie Macayan (2020) and Joel Rey Carcasona (2021)
- First Mister International hosted: 2015 in Manila
- First Miss Intercontinental hosted: 2019 in Manila
- First Mister World hosted: 2019 in Manila

=== National-level pageants ===
- First Miss Philippines: Anita Noble (1926)
- First Miss World Philippines: Vivien Lee Austria (1966)
- First Filipino Miss Universe Philippines:
  - Myrna Panlilio (1964) (Binibining Pilipinas)
  - Rabiya Mateo (2020) (Miss Universe Philippines Organization)
  - First openly bisexual woman Miss Universe Philippines: Beatrice Gomez (2021)
- First Miss International Philippines: Edita Vital (1960)
- First Miss Philippines Earth: Carlene Aguilar (2001)

=== Others ===
- First Filipino to represent the country in the Miss Universe pageant: Teresita Sanchez (1952)
- First Filipino semifinalist at the Miss Universe pageant: Blesilda Ocampo (1954)
- First Filipino to be a runner-up in the Miss Universe pageant: Blesilda Mueler Ocampo (1954)
- First Filipino to place in the Miss World pageant: Pinky Amabuyok (1968)
- First Filipino to win Best in National Costume award in the Miss Universe pageant: Charlene Gonzales (1994)
- First Filipino to win Best in Miss Photogenic award in the Miss Universe pageant: Vida Valentina Doria (1971)
- First Mutya ng Pilipinas winner: Jane Mozo de Joya (1968)
- First Filipina Muslim to win Miss Asia Pacific International: Sharifa Akeel (2018)
- First Binibining Pilipinas candidate who joined the National Pageant twice: Elvira Gonzales (1964 and 1965)
- First Filipino to represent the country in the Miss Grand International pageant: Ali Forbes (2013)
- First Filipino to represent the country in the Miss Supranational pageant: Lourenz Grace Remetillo (2011)
- First Binibining Pilipinas winner to be dethroned: Anjanette Abayari (1991)
- First Filipino to place in the Miss Intercontinental pageant: Maria Sovietskaya Bacud (1995)
- First Filipino to place in the Mr. World pageant: Andrew Wolff (2012)
- First Filipino to place in the Miss Earth pageant: Cathy Untalan (2006)
- First Filipino and Miss World contestant ever to win the Miss Talent award: Louvette Monzon Hammond (1978)
- First Filipino to place in the Miss Supranational pageant: Elaine Kay Moll (2012)
- First Filipino semifinalist at the Miss International pageant: Edita Vital (1960)
- First Filipino to use an interpreter at the Miss Universe pageant: Maxine Medina (2016)
- First Filipino to win Asia's Next Top Model: Maureen Wroblewitz (2017)
- First Filipino to walk in the Victoria's Secret Fashion Show and to appear in the pages of the Sports Illustrated Swimsuit Issue: Kelsey Merritt (2018 and 2019)
- First consecutive titles in Miss Millennial Philippines: Shaila Mae Rebortera (2018) and Nicole Borromeo (2019)

== Business and economy ==
- First Filipino-owned firm to list on the Nasdaq stock exchange: Hotel 101 (June 27, 2025)

== Education ==
- First Filipino Superintendent of schools: Camilo Osías – 1915
- First Filipino language instructor of Harvard University: Lady Aileen Orsal – introduced on August 25, 2023.

== Energy ==
- First nuclear power plant: Bataan Nuclear Power Plant (Note: Completed but never made operational.)

== Exploration ==
- First Filipino to reach the North Pole on board a Russian vessel (icebreaker): Ramon Ilusorio – 1996
- First Filipino to sail solo across Pacific Ocean: Florentino Das – May 14, 1955
- First Filipino to reach the peak of Mount Everest: Leo Oracion – May 17, 2006
- First Filipino to reach the peak of Seven Summits: Romi Garduce – January 6, 2012
- First Filipino (Filipina) to ski to North Pole (True North): Samelene Pimentel - April 21, 2015
- First Filipino (Filipina) to ski to South Pole: Samelene Pimentel - December 26, 2017
- First Filipina to reach the Seven Summits: Carina Dayondon - December 16, 2018
- First Filipino to reach the 3rd deepest spot on Earth: Deo Florence Onda – March 23, 2021
- First Filipino to travel to all the countries in the world (recognized by the United Nations): Odette Aquitania Ricasa – August 25, 2022

== Government and politics ==
=== Vice–President ===
- First Vice–President: Sergio Osmeña – 1935
- First Female Vice–President: Gloria Macapagal Arroyo – 1998

=== Senate ===
- First Senate President: Manuel L. Quezon – 1916
- First female senator: Geronima Pecson – 1947
- First Muslim senator: Hadji Butu – 1916
- First Muslim elected senator: Salipada Pendatun – 1946
- First actor to become senator: Rogelio de la Rosa – 1957
- First Female senator to be re-elected: Eva Estrada Kalaw – 1965

=== House of Representatives ===
- First House Speaker: Sergio Osmeña – 1907
- First female representative: Elisa Rosales-Ochoa – 1941
- First Muslim Deputy Speaker: Salipada Pendatun – 1962
- First openly transgender woman representative: Geraldine Roman – 2016
- First female House Speaker: Gloria Macapagal Arroyo – 2018
- First representative to be expelled: Arnolfo Teves Jr. – 2023

=== Supreme Court ===
- First Chief Justice: Cayetano Arellano – 1901–1920
- First Chief Justice to be impeached: Renato Corona – 2011
- First Female Chief Justice:
  - Maria Lourdes Sereno – 2012–2018 (de facto; tenure nullified through Quo warranto petition)
  - Teresita de Castro – 2018 (de jure)
- First Female Associate Justice: Cecilia Muñoz-Palma – 1973

=== Cabinet ===
- First Female Social Welfare Secretary: Asuncion A. Perez – 1948
- First Muslim Justice Secretary: Simeon Datumanong – 2003

=== Others ===
- First Presidential and Vice–Presidential elections: 1935
- First Senate elections: 1916
- First Elections for House of Representatives: 1898
- First State of the Nation Address: Delivered by Manuel L. Quezon at the Legislative Building on November 25, 1935
- First Filipina judge of the International Criminal Court: Miriam Defensor Santiago – December 12, 2011
- First Nobel Prize laureate: Maria Ressa – 2021 Nobel Peace Prize

== History ==
- First Filipino marriage to a foreigner: Nicolasa de Alvarez, a native Filipino to Pablo Alvarez, a Spaniard – 1585
- First scientific map of the Philippines: Murillo Velarde map – 1734
- First Filipina to lead an uprising against a foreign power: Gabriela Silang – 1763
- First Filipino documented serial killer: Juan Severino Mallari – 1816–1826
- First waterworks system in the Philippines: Carriedo – July 24, 1882
- First Filipino novel: Nínay – authored by Pedro Paterno and published in 1885
- First president of the Katipunan: Deodato Arellano – elected in October 1892
- First ice cream parlor in the Philippines: Clarke's Ice Cream Parlor – 1899
- First labor union in the Philippines: Unión Obrera Democrática Filipina – established on February 2, 1902
- First labor day in the Philippines: throughout the establishment of Congreso Obrero de Filipinas on May 1, 1913
- First female chief nurse and superintendent of the Philippine General Hospital: Anastacia Giron-Tupas – 1917
- First Balagtasan in the Philippines: took place at Instituto de Mujeres in Manila on April 6, 1924
- First comic strip in the Philippines: Kenkoy – published on January 11, 1929
- First Filipina to be featured on the Philippine peso: Tandang Sora – appeared on ₱100 banknote from the English series from 1951 to 1966
- First US president to visit Manila: Dwight D. Eisenhower – June 14, 1960
- First national celebration of Philippine Independence Day on June 12, 1962
- First known dismembered woman in Philippine history: Lucila Lalu – her mutilated body was discovered in the parts of Metro Manila on May 28, 1967
- First National Artist of the Philippines: Fernando Amorsolo – posthumously awarded on April 27, 1972
- First Aeta lawyer in Philippine history: Wayda Cosme – 2001
- First recipient of Certificate of Ancestral Domain Title: awarded in February 2002 to the towns of Bago and Kankanaey in Bakun, Benguet
- First Philippine variety show to be franchised in another country: Eat Bulaga! – throughout Eat Bulaga! Indonesia which was aired on July 16, 2012
- First female Quezon Service Cross recipient: Miriam Defensor Santiago – posthumously awarded on December 3, 2018
- First Filipino to receive a wax figure of themselves: Pia Wurtzbach at Madame Tussauds Hong Kong – March 2019
- First Filipino Lorenzo il Magnifico Award recipient: Michael Villagante – awarded on October 31, 2021
- First Philippine program to launch non-fungible tokens (NFTs) or digital trading cards: Idol Philippines – throughout a partnership with Theta Network which was launched on August 12, 2022

== Military ==
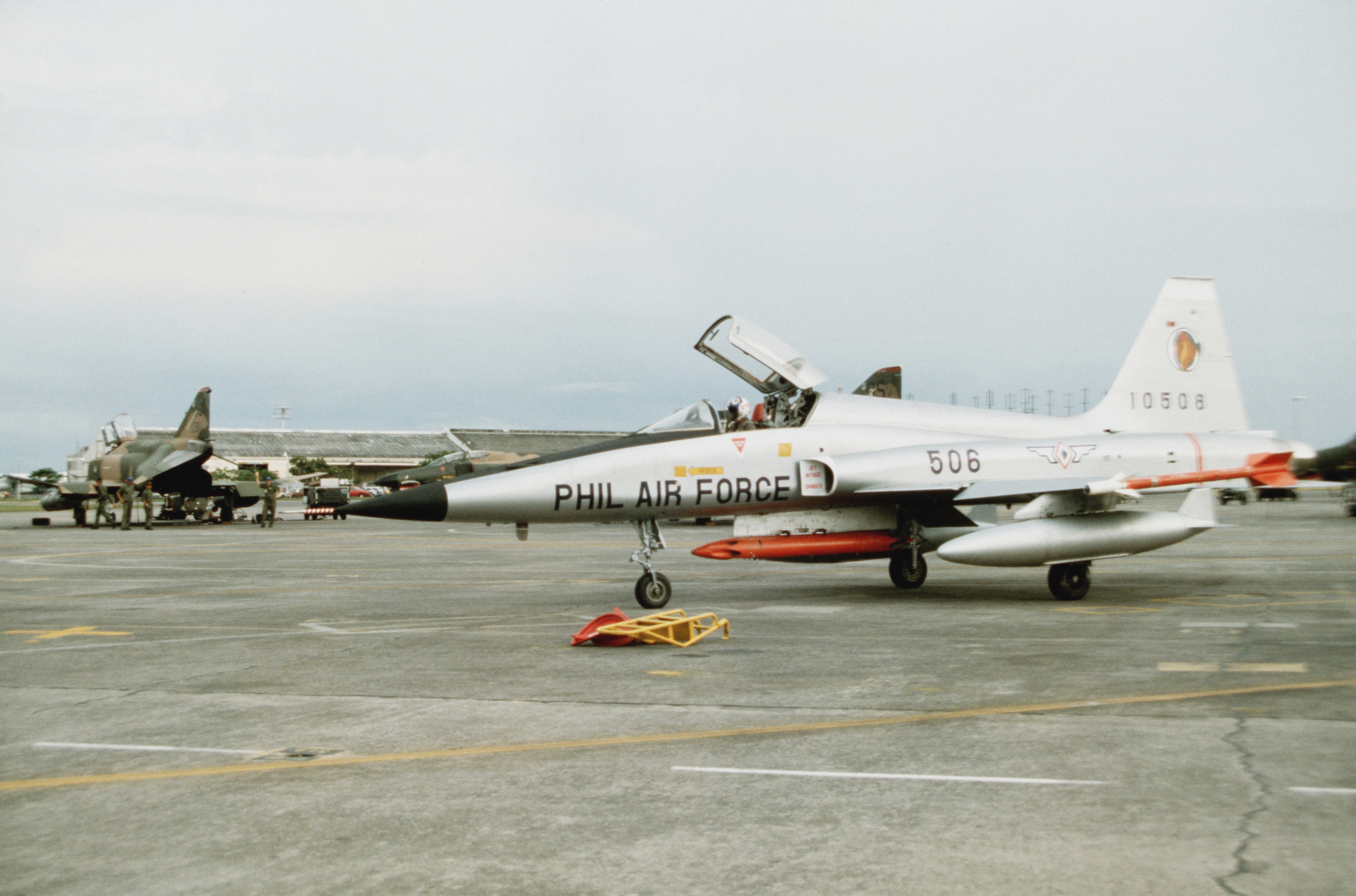
Philippine Air Force F-5E

- First AFP Chief: Artemio Ricarte – appointed on March 22, 1897
- First Filipino graduate of the United States Military Academy: Gen. Vicente Lim, Philippine Army, 1914
- First Filipino graduate of the United States Naval Academy: Col. Jose Emilio Olivares, US Army, Philippine Scouts, 1923
- First Filipino Muslim to be conferred the rank of brigadier general: Gen. Salipada Pendatun, Philippine Army, 1940s
- First Filipino graduate of the United States Air Force Academy: Col. Roberto Barangan, Philippine Air Force, 1966
- First female battalion commander: Ramona Palabrica-Go – appointed in January 2003
- First female fighter pilot: Jul Laiza Mae Camposano-Beran – introduced on March 31, 2022

== Performing arts ==
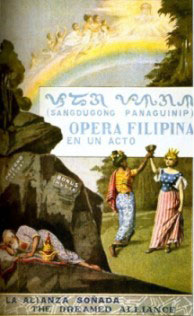
Sangdugong Panaguinip, the first Philippine Tagalog-language opera.

- First Filipino to be awarded a star on the Hollywood Walk of Fame: Lea Salonga – September 4, 2026

=== Film ===
- First films screened: Un Homme Au Chapeau (Man with a Hat), Une scene de danse Japonaise (Scene from a Japanese Dance), Les Boxers (The Boxers), and La Place de L’ Opera (The Place L’ Opera) at the Salon de Pertierra in Escolta, Manila – January 1, 1897
- First films shot: Panorama de Manila (Manila landscape), Fiesta de Quiapo (Quiapo Fiesta), Puwente de España (Bridge of Spain), and Esceñas Callejeras (Street scenes) by Antonio Ramos (also first Filipino motion picture producer) – 1898
- First hall exclusively for film viewing: Cine Walgrah at No. 60 Calle Santa Rosa in Intramuros, Manila – opened in 1900
- First Filipino-owned movie theater: Cinematograpo Rizal established by Jose Jimenez along Azcarraga street in Manila – opened in 1903
- First film produced in the Philippines: La vida de Jose Rizal by Rizalina Photoplay Company and directed by Edward Gross, an American – August 23, 1912
- First film produced in the Philippines by Filipinos: Dalagang Bukid – September 19, 1919
- First kissing scene in Philippine cinema: Luis Tuason and Isabel "Dimples" Cooper in the film Ang Tatlong Hambog – 1926
- First Filipino horror film: Ang Manananggal – 1927
- First all-talking, completely sound Filipino film: Punyal na Ginto – March 9, 1933
- First Filipino film to have gained international recognition: Zamboanga – 1937
- First Filipino female feature film director: Carmen Concha – 1939
- First Filipino film with colored sequences: Ibong Adarna – 1941
- First Filipino film in full-color: Prinsipe Amante – 1951
- First Filipino film to be acclaimed in an international film festival: Genghis Khan – showed on the Venice Film Festival in 1952
- First Filipino full-length animation film: Tadhana – 1978
- First Filipino short film to win Best Short Film at the Cannes Film Festival: Anino by Raymond Red – May 25, 2000
- First IMAX theater: IMAX Mall of Asia – opened in 2006
- First Filipino film director to win Best Director at the Cannes Film Festival: Brillante Mendoza – May 23, 2009
- First Filipino actress to win Best Actress at the Cannes Film Festival: Jaclyn Jose – May 22, 2016
- First Filipino actress with two films that reached the ₱800-million (about US$12 million) mark at the box office: Kathryn Bernardo (The Hows of Us and Hello, Love, Goodbye) – 2018 and 2019
- First animated Netflix film from the Philippines: Hayop Ka!: The Nimfa Dimaano Story – October 29, 2020
- First Filipino actor to win Best Actor at the Asian Academy Creative Awards: Arjo Atayde – December 4, 2020
- First Filipino actor to win Best Actor at the Venice Film Festival: John Arcilla – September 11, 2021
- First Filipino actress to win Outstanding Asian Star at the Seoul International Drama Awards: Belle Mariano – September 5, 2022
- First Filipina to be nominated for a Golden Globe Award: Dolly de Leon (for Best Supporting Actress) – December 14, 2022
- First openly transgender woman to win Best Supporting Actress at the Metro Manila Film Festival: KaladKaren – April 11, 2023

=== Music ===
- First Philippine opera in the Tagalog language: Sangdugong Panaguinip composed by Ladislao Bonus – premiere on August 2, 1902, at the Zorrilla Theater in Manila.
- First Filipino international opera singer: Jovita Fuentes (Madama Butterfly) – 1925
- First Filipino boy band act to land a spot on the US Billboard Top 100 Chart: The Rocky Fellers – 1963
- First Filipino solo recording artist to chart in the US, as her debut single "If You Leave Me Now" peaked at 44 at the Billboard Hot 100 chart: Jaya – 1989
- First Filipino to win a Tony Award: Lea Salonga for Best Actress in a Musical (Miss Saigon) – June 2, 1991
- First Filipino and Asian solo singer to land in the Top 10 at the US Billboard 200, as her studio album Charice peaked at number 8: Charice – 2010
- First Filipino group to be nominated in the Billboard Music Awards: SB19 – 2021
- First Filipino act and P-pop artist featured on the Recording Academy Grammy's Global Spin live series: Felip – 2022

=== Television ===
- First Filipino to win a Daytime Emmy Award for a non-acting category: Ronnie del Carmen for Daytime Emmy Award for Outstanding Special Class Animated Program as one of the directors of Freakazoid in 1996.
- First Filipino to win a Primetime Emmy Award for a non-acting category: Jess Española for Primetime Emmy Award for Outstanding Animated Program as an assistant director of "Eternal Moonshine of the Simpson Mind" from the 19th season of The Simpsons.

== Publications ==
- First daily newspaper: The Philippines Herald

== Religion ==
- First Filipino Christians: Rajah Humabon, Rajah Colambu, and 400 other Filipinos – April 14, 1521
- First Catholic Holy Mass: Site of event disputed – 1521
  - Easter Mass in Limasawa – officially recognized by the government through Republic Act No. 2733
  - Other proposed sites of the event by historians includes Masao, or Mazaua in Butuan, and Magallanes in Agusan del Norte
- First Religious Order in the Philippines: Franciscans – 1577
- First Filipino priest: Martin Lakandula – 1590
- First Catholic printed book in the Philippines: Doctrina Christiana – 1593
- First known Filipino to meet a pope: Fr. Faustino Villafranca met Pope Pius IX at Santa Maria sopra Minerva in Rome, Italy, on April 7, 1869
- First Filipino Catholic cardinal: Rufino Santos – by Pope John XXIII in 1960
- First Filipino Catholic bishop: Jorge Barlin – 1905
- First Filipino Catholic saint: Lorenzo Ruiz – canonized by Pope John Paul II on October 18, 1987
- First Filipino Master of the Order of Preachers: Gerard Timoner III – elected on July 13, 2019
- First Filipino Pontifical Swiss Guard: Sebastian Esai Eco Eviota – joined on January 22, 2022
- First Filipino Superior General of the De La Salle Brothers: Armin Luistro – elected on May 18, 2022
- First Filipino Provincial Superior of the Society of Jesus in the Philippines:Horacio De La Costa.
- First Marian international shrine in the Philippines: Antipolo Cathedral – declared on June 18, 2022
- First papal visit in the Philippines: Pope Paul VI on November 27–29, 1970 in Manila
- First National Eucharistic Congress of the Philippines hosted: 1929 in Manila
- First Eucharistic congress hosted: 1937 in Manila
- First National Youth Day of the Philippines hosted: 1986 in Manila
- First World Youth Day hosted: 1995 in Manila
- First World Meeting of Families hosted: 2003 in Manila
- First Asian Youth Day hosted: 2009 in Cavite
- First Catholic exorcism center: St. Michael Center for Exorcism and Spiritual Liberation in Makati – opened in March 2026 (also the first in Asia)

== Science and technology ==
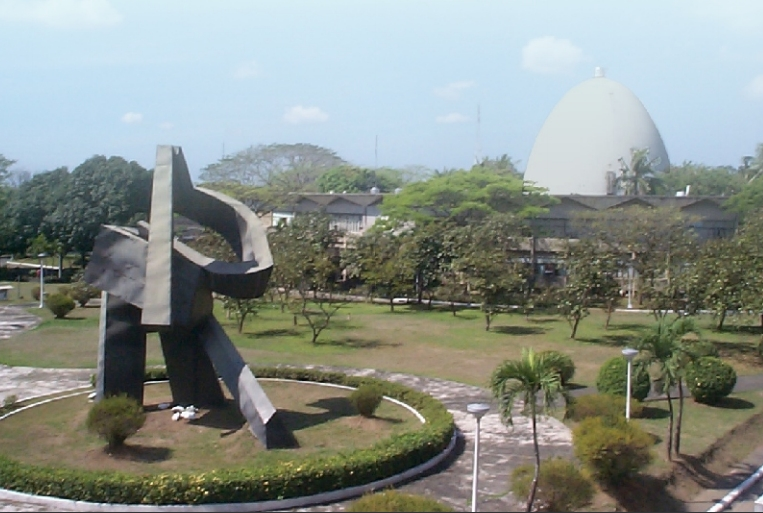
The PRR-1, the first nuclear reactor in the Philippines.

=== Communications ===
- First internet connection: March 29, 1994
- First Philippine-based bulletin board system: First-Fil RBBS – went online August 1986
- First 5G video call made: February 21, 2020 – by representatives of local firm Globe Telecom and AIS Thailand lasting more than three minutes

=== Electric transportation ===
- First hybrid electric train: DOST Hybrid Electric Train (HET) – April 24, 2019

=== Medical science ===
- First kidney transplant: Rainier Lagman by a 12-man medical team led by Dr. Jorge Garcia at the Makati Medical Center – May 28, 1994
- First pediatric liver transplant: Erica Buenaventura, a three-year-old, by an 11-member surgical team led by Dr. Vanessa De Villa at The Medical City Ortigas – January 7, 2011

=== Nuclear physics ===
- First nuclear reactor: Philippine Research Reactor-1 – first criticality in 1963

=== Space science ===
- First satellites:
  - First satellite owned by a Filipino entity: Agila 1/Mabuhay – acquired as Palapa B2-P by Mabuhay Satellite Corporation from PT Pasifik Satelit Nusantara in 1996
  - First Filipino satellite launched to space: Agila 2 – launched in 1997
  - First satellite designed and built by Filipinos / microsatellite: Diwata-1 – launched and deployed in 2016
  - First Filipino cube satellite launched to space: Maya-1 – launched and deployed in 2018
- First asteroids named after a Filipino: 6282 Edwelda – named after Edwin Aguirre and Imelda Joson in 1995
- First minor planet named after a Filipino: 13241 Biyo – named after Dr. Josette Biyo in 1998
- First Filipina mission operations manager of NASA: Angelita Castro-Kelly – appointed in 1990

== Sports ==
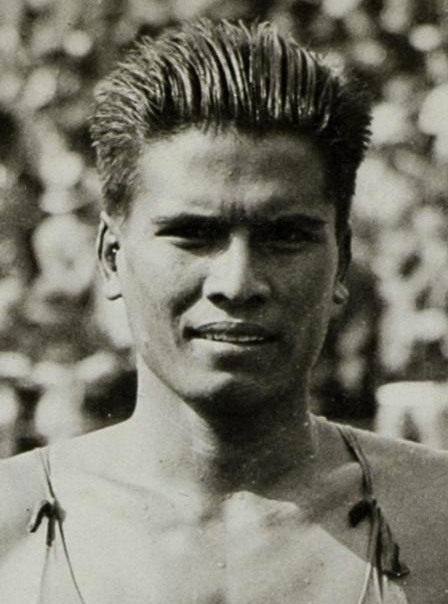
Teófilo Yldefonso, the first athlete to win a medal for the Philippines at the Olympics.

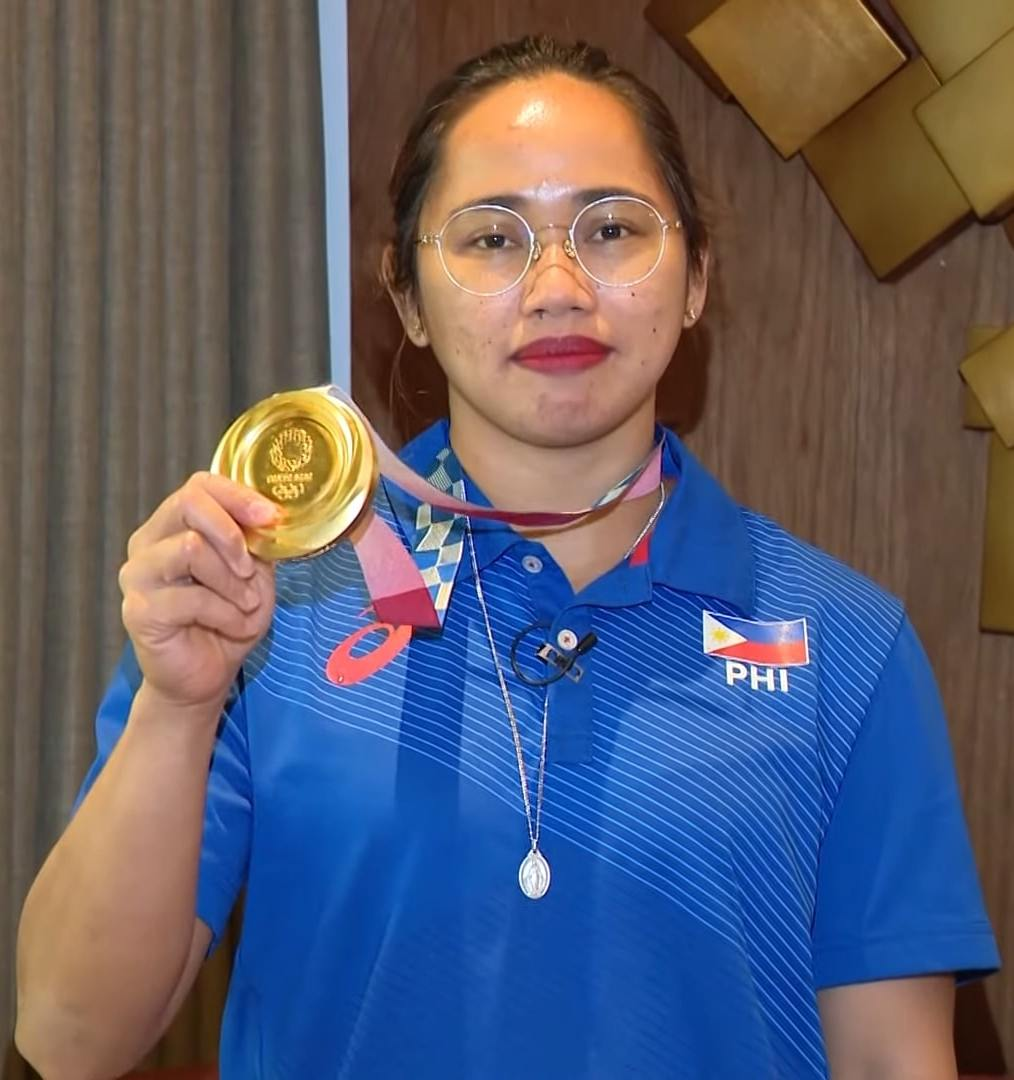
Hidilyn Diaz, the Philippines' first Olympic gold medalist.

=== Olympics ===
- First competitor for the Philippines in the Olympics: David Nepomuceno (athletics) – 1924 Summer Olympics in Paris
- First Filipino Olympic medalist: Teofilo Yldefonso (swimming) – Bronze; Men's 200 meter breaststroke at the 1928 Summer Olympics in Amsterdam
- First Filipino Olympic gold medalist:
  - In a regular sport (official): Hidilyn Diaz (weightlifting) – Women's 55 kg at the 2020 Summer Olympics in Tokyo
  - In a demonstration sport: Arianne Cerdeña (bowling) – 1988 Summer Olympics in Seoul (Note: Bowling was just a demonstration sport at the 1988 Summer Olympics; therefore, the medal is not credited to the overall medal tally for the Philippines.)
  - In a mixed-NOC competition: Luis Gabriel Moreno (archery; with Li Jiaman of China) – Mixed team at the 2014 Youth Summer Olympics in Nanjing (Note: While Moreno is a competitor for the Philippines, the medal he won in the mixed team event is credited to the Mixed-NOC in the official medal tally.)
- First male Filipino Olympic gold medalist (official): Carlos Yulo (gymnastics) – Men's floor at the 2024 Summer Olympics in Paris
- First Filipino Olympic silver medalist: Anthony Villanueva (boxing) – Men's featherweight at the 1968 Summer Olympics in Tokyo
- First female Filipino Olympic silver medalist (official): Hidilyn Diaz (weightlifting) – Women's 53 kg weightlifting at the 2016 Summer Olympics in Rio de Janeiro
- First Filipino Winter Olympians: Juan Cipriano and Ben Nanasca (alpine skiing) – 1972 Winter Olympics in Sapporo
- First Filipino marathoner to qualify for the Olympics: Mary Joy Tabal (athletics) – 2016 Summer Olympics in Rio de Janeiro

=== By sports ===
==== Basketball ====
- First Filipino player to score a basket in the history of Philippine Basketball Association: Gregorio "Joy" Dionisio – April 9, 1975
- First Filipino team to win the All-Filipino title for 5 consecutive seasons in the history of Philippine Basketball Association: San Miguel Beermen – 2015–2019
- First Filipino World University Basketball Series champion: Ateneo Blue Eagles – August 11, 2022
- First Filipino player to be inducted into the FIBA Hall of Fame: Carlos Loyzaga – August 23, 2023
- First Filipino player to be part of an NBA Finals-winning team: Jordan Clarkson with the New York Knicks – June 13, 2026

==== Boxing ====
- First Filipino to win World Flyweight Champion division title: Francisco "Pancho Villa" Guilledo – June 18, 1923
- First Filipino to win 12 major world titles in eight weight divisions: Manny Pacquiao – 1998–2018

==== Chess ====
- First Filipino chess Grandmaster: Eugene Torre – 1974
- First Filipino Woman Grandmaster: Janelle Mae Frayna – September 2016 (Note: Became woman grandmaster in 2016, title confirmed by FIDE in March 2017.)
- First Filipino to be inducted into the World Chess Hall of Fame: Eugene Torre – April 22, 2021

==== Football ====
- First official football game: Match at the opening of the Philippine Assembly – October 16, 1907 (Note: It was not specified in the source which clubs or teams participated in the match but the trophy of the tournament was won by Sandow football team which became a club in 1909.)
- First football tournament: 1913 Far Eastern Championship Games (also first in Asia)
- First Filipino to play in the English Premier League: Neil Etheridge for Cardiff City F.C. (2018–19 season) (also the first Southeast Asian)
- First Filipino football team to qualify for the FIFA Women's World Cup: Philippines women's national football team – January 31, 2022
- First Filipino football team to reach podium finish in the Southeast Asian Games: Philippines women's national football team – May 21, 2022
- First Filipino AFF Women's Championship champion: Philippines women's national football team – July 17, 2022
- First Filipino goalscorer at a FIFA Women's World Cup: Sarina Bolden – against New Zealand on July 25, 2023

==== Tennis ====
- First Filipina to enter the WTA rankings: Dyan Castillejo – ranked 403 in 1986
- First Filipino juniors Grand Slam champion: Francis Alcantara – 2009 Australian Open – Boys' doubles in Melbourne, Australia
- First Filipina juniors Grand Slam champion: Alexandra Eala – 2020 Australian Open – Girls' doubles in Melbourne, Australia
- First Filipino juniors Grand Slam singles champion: Alexandra Eala – 2022 US Open – Girls' singles in New York City, United States
- First Filipina to defeat a WTA top-30 player: Alexandra Eala against Jeļena Ostapenko (then-ranked 25) at the 2025 Miami Open – Women's singles second round in Miami, United States
- First Filipina to defeat a top-10 player (in the Open Era) since the WTA rankings began in 1975: Alexandra Eala against Madison Keys (then-ranked 5) at the 2025 Miami Open – Women's singles third round in Miami, United States
- First Filipina to reach a WTA Tour final: Alexandra Eala at the 2025 Eastbourne Open – Women's singles in Eastbourne, England, United Kingdom
- First Filipino to reach the fourth round of a Grand Slam singles tournament (in the Open Era): Alexandra Eala at the 2026 Wimbledon Championships – Women's singles in Wimbledon, London, England, United Kingdom
- First Filipina to win a WTA Tour singles title: Alexandra Eala at the 2026 Mubadala DC Open – Women's singles in Washington, D.C., United States

==== Volleyball ====
- First Asian Women's Volleyball Cup hosted: 2022 in Manila

==== Others ====
- First Asian Games hosted: 1954 in Manila
- First Filipina NEC Karuizawa 72 champion: Yuka Saso (golf) – 2020 LPGA of Japan Tour in Kitasaku District, Nagano, Japan
- First Filipina Simone Asia Pacific Cup champion: Princess Mary Superal (golf) – 2022 Simone Asia Pacific Cup in Jakarta, Indonesia
- First Filipina U.S. Women's Open champion: Yuka Saso (golf) – 2021 U.S. Women's Open in San Francisco, California, United States
- First Filipina World Games medalist: Junna Tsukii (karate) – 2022 World Games in Birmingham, Alabama, United States
- First Filipino APF Asian Women's 9-Ball Open champion: Chezka Centeno – August 28, 2022
- First Filipino Asian Winter Games medalists: Marc Pfister, Christian Haller, Enrico Pfister, Alan Frei, and Benjo Delarmente (curling) – gold at the 2025 Asian Winter Games in Harbin, China (also the first Southeast Asian gold medalists at the Asian Winter Games)
- First Filipino F1 Academy champion: Bianca Bustamante (motorsport) – 2023 F1 Academy season in Cheste, Valencian Community, Spain
- First Filipino Junior World Championships qualifier: Sofia Frank (figure skating) – 2021 Santa Claus Cup in Budapest, Hungary
- First Filipino JuJutsu World Championship gold medalist: Meggie Ochoa (jiu-jitsu) – 2018 JuJutsu World Championship in Malmö, Sweden
- First Filipino North Pole Marathon finisher: Victor Consunji – April 2016
- First Filipina North Pole Marathon finisher: Joyette Jopson – April 2019
- First Filipino Spartan World Championships finisher: Elias Tabac – December 2021
- First Filipino to participate in Street League Skateboarding: Margielyn Didal (skateboarding) – 2018 in London, England, United Kingdom
- First Filipino to participate in the X Games: Margielyn Didal (skateboarding) – 2018 in Minneapolis, Minnesota, United States
- First Filipino to win all gold medals in the Southeast Asian Games: Carlos Yulo (gymnastics) – 2021 Southeast Asian Games in Hanoi, Vietnam
- First Filipino UCI Mountain Bike World Championships participant: Ariana Evangelista (cycle sports) – 2022 UCI Mountain Bike World Championships in Les Gets, France
- First Filipino Universiade gold medalist: Wesley So (chess) – 2013 Summer Universiade in Kazan, Russia
- First Filipino U.S. Open Nine-ball champion: Efren Reyes – 1994
- First Filipino Winter Universiade participant: Misha Fabian (figure skating) – 2019 Winter Universiade in Krasnoyarsk, Russia
- First Filipino World Artistic Gymnastics Championships gold medalist: Carlos Yulo (gymnastics) – 2019 World Artistic Gymnastics Championships in Stuttgart, Germany
- First Filipino World Athletics Championships medalist: EJ Obiena (pole vault) – 2021 World Athletics Championships in Eugene, Oregon, United States
- First Filipino W Series participant: Bianca Bustamante (motorsport) – 2022 W Series in Barcelona, Spain
- First full Twenty20 International match of the Philippine national cricket team: vs. Papua New Guinea, March 22, 2019, in Amini Park, Port Moresby, Papua New Guinea (2018–19 ICC T20 World Cup East Asia-Pacific Qualifier – Regional Final)
- First Southeast Asian Games hosted: 1981 in Manila

== Transportation ==
- First automobile in the Philippines: Richard-Brasier roadster car – imported in 1904
- First aircraft to fly in the Philippines: Shriver's Skylark biplane of James "Bud" Mars – February 21, 1911
- First certified Filipino pilot: Alfredo Carmelo, January 9, 1920
- First commercial airline in the Philippines: Iloilo-Negros Air Express (INAEC) – February 1, 1933
- First supersonic aircraft: Northrop F-5 – first unit acquired in 1965 (also first in Southeast Asia)
- First Filipino to pilot a Concorde: Captain Joe "Pepot" Gonzales, August 7, 1975
- First female commercial airline captain: Aimee Carandang – 1993
- First Filipino certified to pilot an Airbus A380: Captain Franklyn Desiderio, January 2014
- First Filipino airline to operate 100 aircraft: Cebu Pacific, July 2025

== See also ==
- List of records of the Philippines
