= International rankings of the Philippines =

National rating on multiple scales

The following are international rankings of the Philippines.

== General ==
- Good Country Index 2017: ranked 51 out of 163

== Air ==
- Air Quality Life Index 2020: ranked 70th out of 106 nations

== Demographics ==
- Population: ranked 12 (July 2014 est.)
- Population density: ranked 24
- Total immigrant population: ranked 101 out of 228 countries (2013 est.)

== Economics ==
- Motor Vehicle Production (OICA): ranked 39 (2013 est.)
- Labor Force: ranked 16 (2013 est.)
- Proved Natural Gas Production: ranked 55 (2008 est.)
- Proved Natural Gas Reserves: ranked 52 (2009 est.)
- Proved Oil Production: ranked 71 (2008 est.)
- Proved Oil Reserves: ranked 62 (2009 est.)
- Electricity Consumption: ranked 44 (2009 est.)
- Electricity Production: ranked 38 (2013 est.)
- Total Renewable Water Resources: ranked 23 (2011 est.)
- Freshwater withdrawal: ranked 28 (2000 est.)
- Land Use: ranked 27 (2005 est.)
- Exclusive Economic Zone Area: ranked 22
- Irrigated Lands: ranked 30 (2003 est.)
- Foreign direct investment (FDI) abroad: ranked 55 (2012 est.)
- Foreign direct investment (FDI) received: ranked 64 (2010 est.)
- Freedom from Corruption^{[unfit]}: ranked 97 (2013 est.)

== Environment ==
- World Risk Index 2013: ranked 170 out of 172
- Environmental Performance Index 2014: 114 out of 178

== Geography ==
- Total Area: ranked 73
- Length of Coastline: ranked 4
- Longest Coastline (Countries without Land Borders): ranked 1
- Total Forest Area: ranked 65

== Press freedom ==
- In 2014, the Reporters Without Borders Press Freedom Index ranked the Philippines 149th out of 180 countries rated.

== Society ==
- Human Development Index (United Nations): ranked 117 out of 187 countries (2013 est.)
- Suicide Rate: ranked 90 (2005 est.)
- Happy Planet Index 2012: ranked 24 out of 111
- Where-to-be-born Index 2005: (Economist Intelligence Unit): ranked 63 out of 80
- Education Index 2008: ranked 66
- Global Gender Gap Report 2014: (World Economic Forum): ranked 8 out of 136
- Legatum Prosperity Index 2014: ranked 67 out of 142
- Satisfaction with Life Index 2018: ranked 78 out of 178 countries.
- Programme for International Student Assessment 2018: ranked 79 out of 79 countries in reading comprehension, 78 out of 79 countries in science, and 78 out of 79 countries in mathematics
- Trends in International Mathematics and Science Study 2019: ranked 58 out of 58 countries in mathematics and science proficiency
- Ethnic and cultural diversity level (James Fearon): ranked 137 out of 159 (2003 est.)
- World Giving Index 2014: ranked 30 out of 135rts
- FIBA World Rankings - men (basketball): 28 out of 87 (Oct 2015)
- FIBA World Rankings - women (basketball): 49 out of 75 (Oct 2015)
- FIFA Men's World Rankings (association football): 128 out of 209 (Mar 2015)
- FIFA Women's World Rankings (association football): 80 out of 177 (Dec 2014)
- World Rugby Rankings (rugby union): 52 out of 102 (Mar 2015)
- IBAF World Rankings (baseball): 23 out of 73 (Nov 2014)

== Technology ==
- E-readiness (Economist Intelligence Unit): ranked 55
- Number of Telephones - main lines in use: ranked 43 (2012)
- Number of Mobile Phones: ranked 12 (2012)
- Number of Internet Users: ranked 34 (2009)
- Average Internet connection speed: ranked 49 out of 55 (2014)
- Number of Internet hosts: ranked 52 out of 233 (2012)
- World Intellectual Property Organization: Global Innovation Index 2026, ranked 52 out of 139 countries

== Tourism ==
- World's most visited country (UNWTO): ranked 52 (2008)

International tourism
Year	Arrivals (1,000s)	Receipts (million US$)
2010	3,520	2,645
2017	6,621	6,988
2018	7,129	7,461

== Transportation ==
- Number of Airports: ranked 24 (2013)
- Railways: ranked 88 (2010)
- Roadways: ranked 23 (2009)
- Waterways: ranked 31 (2011)
- Merchant Marine: ranked 23 (2010)

== Cities ==
- Largest Urban Area by Population (Metro Manila): ranked 3 (2015)
- Largest Metropolis by Population (Metro Manila): ranked 11
- Manila (Richest cities, PricewaterhouseCoopers): ranked 40
- Manila (Most expensive cities, Mercer Human Resource Consulting 2008): ranked 126

== See also ==
- List of records of the Philippines
- List of firsts in the Philippines
