= Nuclear power in the Philippines =

Executive Order No. 164, signed by President Rodrigo Duterte in February 2022 included nuclear power in the country's energy mix.

Nuclear energy was considered as an alternative source of energy after the 1973 oil crisis affected the Philippines. The Bataan Nuclear Power Plant was built by President Ferdinand Marcos in the early 1980s, but never went into operation after it was mothballed by Marcos' successor, President Corazon Aquino, who cited the possibility of a reactor meltdown after the 1986 Chernobyl disaster, as well as the increase of the price of the plant. The Fukushima nuclear disaster in 2011 dampened further efforts to revive the nuclear power plant and nuclear energy in the country. Proposals to revive the plant remain controversial.

== History ==
On June 22, 1957, the Philippines approved under Republic Act No. 1815 known as "Philippine Nuclear Energy Act of 1957".

On June 13, 1958, the Philippines approved under Republic Act No. 2067, known as the "Science Act of 1958".

The Philippine Research Reactor-1 was operated from 1963 until 1988 by the Philippine Nuclear Research Institute in Quezon City.

On June 15, 1968, President Ferdinand Marcos approved under Republic Act No. 5207 known as "Atomic Energy Regulatory and Liability Act of 1968". On June 11, 1978, Presidend Ferdinand Marcos approved under Presidential Decree No. 1484 as amended.

In December 2020, a group of experts from International Atomic Energy Agency (IAEA) was invited by the Philippine government to review the country's nuclear infrastructure. Energy Secretary Alfonso Cusi has been quoted saying that the mission will help with finally making nuclear power a part of the country's energy mix.

In February 2022, President Rodrigo Duterte approved and signed an executive order to include nuclear power in the country's energy mix, as authorities prepare to phase out of coal-fired power plants and after earlier efforts failed due to safety concerns. The order states that it can combat the power outages and the electricity prices, despite environmental radiation concerns. Duterte said nuclear power would be tapped as a viable alternative baseload power source as the Philippines seeks to retire coal plants to help meet climate goals. The weak electrical grid connections between the over 1,000 inhabited islands of the Philippine archipelago presents a challenge to a nuclear policy. The mothballed Bataan Nuclear Power Plant is close to Manila, the largest electrical demand location, so is an option for revival or the site of a new plant.

On September 18, 2025, President Bongbong Marcos signs under Republic Act No. 12305 known as Philippine National Nuclear Energy Safety Act.

== The Bataan Nuclear Power Plant ==
Under a regime of martial law, President Ferdinand Marcos in July 1973 announced the decision to build a nuclear power plant. This was in response to the 1973 oil crisis, as the Middle East oil embargo had put a heavy strain on the Philippine economy, and Marcos believed nuclear power to be the solution to meeting the country's energy demands and decreasing dependence on imported oil.

In 1976, construction on the Bataan Nuclear Power Plant (BNPP) began. Following the 1979 Three Mile Island accident in the United States, construction on the BNPP was stopped, and a safety inquiry into the plant revealed over 4,000 defects. Among the issues raised was that it was built near major faults and close to the then dormant Pinatubo volcano. Issues of overpricing, bribery, corruption, mismanagement were also raised. In November 1979, President Ferdinand Marcos stated via a decree that the continuation of the construction was not possible due to potential hazards to the health and safety of the public. However, the Marcos administration eventually supported the project.

In 2009, a bill was filed in the Philippine House of Representatives to recommission and operate the Bataan Nuclear Power Plant. The cost for rehabilitation was placed at US$1 billion, to be shouldered by taxpayers through loans and additional charges to consumers. The Center for Environmental Concerns-Philippines, No to BNPP Revival, and Advocates of Science and Technology for the People (AGHAM), and the Freedom from Debt Coalition opposed the bill, saying that the nuclear plant was defective and dangerous and harbored technical flaw. Concerns were also raised in the House of Representatives concerning nuclear waste disposal, geological hazards, and unfinished debt payments.

The Department of Energy of the Philippines in 2016 revived proposals to operate the Bataan Nuclear Power Plant, with the cost for rehabilitating the plant estimated at US$1 billion. Proponents to revive the plant cite possible cost saving and sustainability. Issues were raised against the plant in the Philippine Senate and by Greenpeace Philippines, No to BNPP, Nuclear Free Bataan Movement, and Balanga (Bataan) Bishop Ruperto Santos regarding corruption, cost, and safety.

== See also ==
- Electricity sector in the Philippines
- Philippine Research Reactor-1
- Philippine Nuclear Research Institute
- Anti-nuclear movement in the Philippines
