= Philippine Research Institute =

Philippine Research Institute may refer to:

- Philippine Rice Research Institute
- Philippine Nuclear Research Institute
