= PAEC =

PAEC may refer to:

- Pakistan Atomic Energy Commission
- Philippine Atomic Energy Commission
- Pão de Açúcar Esporte Clube, Brazilian football club
- Potential Alpha Energy Concentration
- Parental Advisory Explicit Content, Voluntary music warning label
