= Emden Deep =

Deepest part of the Philippine Trench

Approximate location of Emden Deep in the Philippine Trench

The Emden Deep, also known as the Galathea Deep or Galathea Depth, is the portion of the 10,540-metre-deep (34,580 ft) Philippine Trench exceeding 6,000-metre (20,000 ft) depths in the south-western Pacific Ocean.

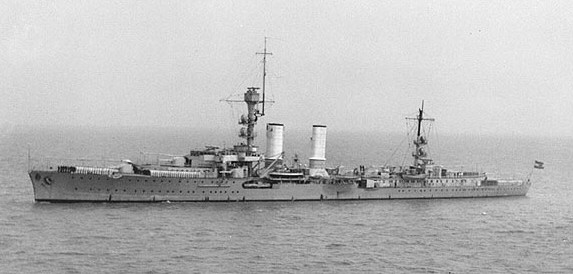
Discoverer ship Emden

Originally discovered by the German ship Emden in 1927, it was first explored in detail by the Danish ship Galathea in 1951 on the Galathea 2 expedition, from which the name is taken. Biological samples collected during the Danish expedition demonstrated for the first time that a wide variety of fish, amphipods, echinoderms and bacteria not only survived, but thrived at the deepest parts of the ocean. At the time of the expedition, the Philippine Trench was the deepest known part of the ocean.

The first crewed descent to the Emden Deep was made by American undersea explorer Victor Vescovo and Filipino oceanographer Deo Florence Onda on March 23, 2021. Findings of the expedition include extensive garbage near the seafloor of the underwater feature.

== See also ==
- Challenger Deep
