= Rizal Memorial Library and Museum =

Neoclassical heritage site in Cebu City, Philippines

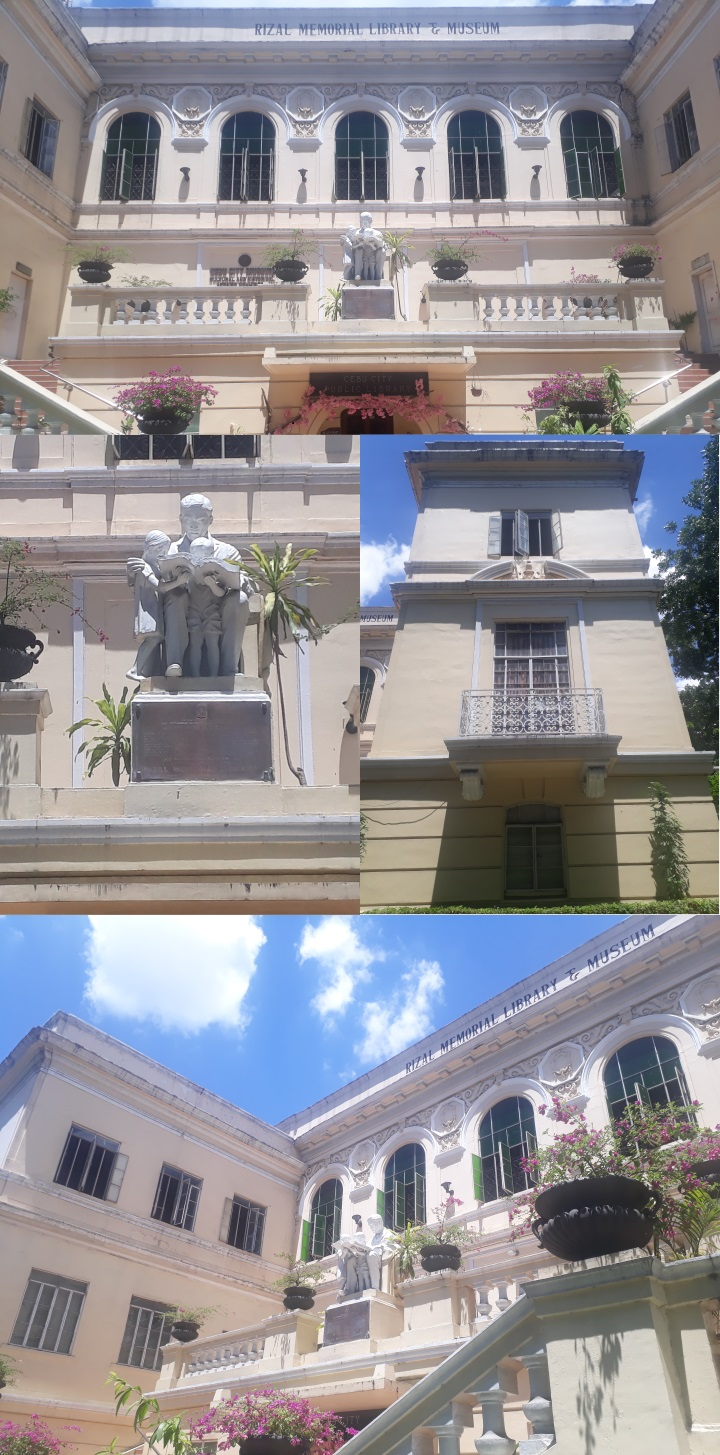
- Facade of the Rizal Memorial Library and Museum

- Location within Visayas
- Former names: Rizal Memorial Library Building

General information
- Type: Library, Museum, Offices
- Architectural style: Neoclassical architecture
- Location: Cebu City, Philippines, 102 Osmeña Boulevard, Cebu City, Cebu, Philippines
- Coordinates: 10°18′43″N 123°53′31″E
- Current tenants: Cebu City Public Library; Cebu City Museum of Visual Arts; Sinulog Hall
- Inaugurated: December 30, 1939
- Owner: Cebu City Government

Design and construction
- Architect: Juan M. Arellano

Rizal Memorial Library and Museum is a three-story, pre-war, neoclassical heritage site and landmark in Cebu City, Philippines. Dedicated to the national hero, Jose P. Rizal, it was designed by Filipino architect Juan M. Arellano, who also designed the Cebu Provincial Capitol building. Inaugurated in 1939, the building survived World War II. It is located along Osmeña Boulevard and houses the offices of Cebu City Tourism, the Cultural and Historical Affairs Commission, the Sinulog Hall on the third floor, the Cebu City Museum of Visual Arts on the second floor, and the Cebu City Public Library on the ground floor.

== History ==
=== Origin ===
In the 1930s, an association called Los Tocayos de Rizal that was composed of men who shared Jose Rizal's first name held a fundraising campaign to erect a monument in his honor. Flavia Suson-Muaña, the librarian at the National Library of the Philippines' branch in Cebu, learned of the project and reached out to Jose Nolasco, member of the first council of Cebu City that was elected on December 14, 1937 and Tocayos' project chairman. Muaña dissuaded the group from pursuing the original plan and, in the place of a monument, proposed to construct a building to house the library. National Library of the Philippines director Teodoro Kalaw later approved Muaña's proposal.

=== Funding ===
Nolasco, Los Tocayos de Rizal, and the general public contributed to fund the construction of the project. Aside from being a councilman, Nolasco was the organizer of the annual Cebu Carnival, the local version of Manila Carnival, a festival held to celebrate the harmonious US-Philippine relations. The pioneering provincial event hosted shows like circus acts, acrobatics, and amusement rides, and culminated in a beauty pageant. Its first beauty queen, Sibonga mestiza Enriqueta Aldanese de Lasso de Vega, was crowned in 1914 and she would later become Queen of the 1918 Manila Carnival. Funds were raised from the proceeds of the carnival expositions and from the ticket sales of literary musicals since 1919.

=== Design and construction ===
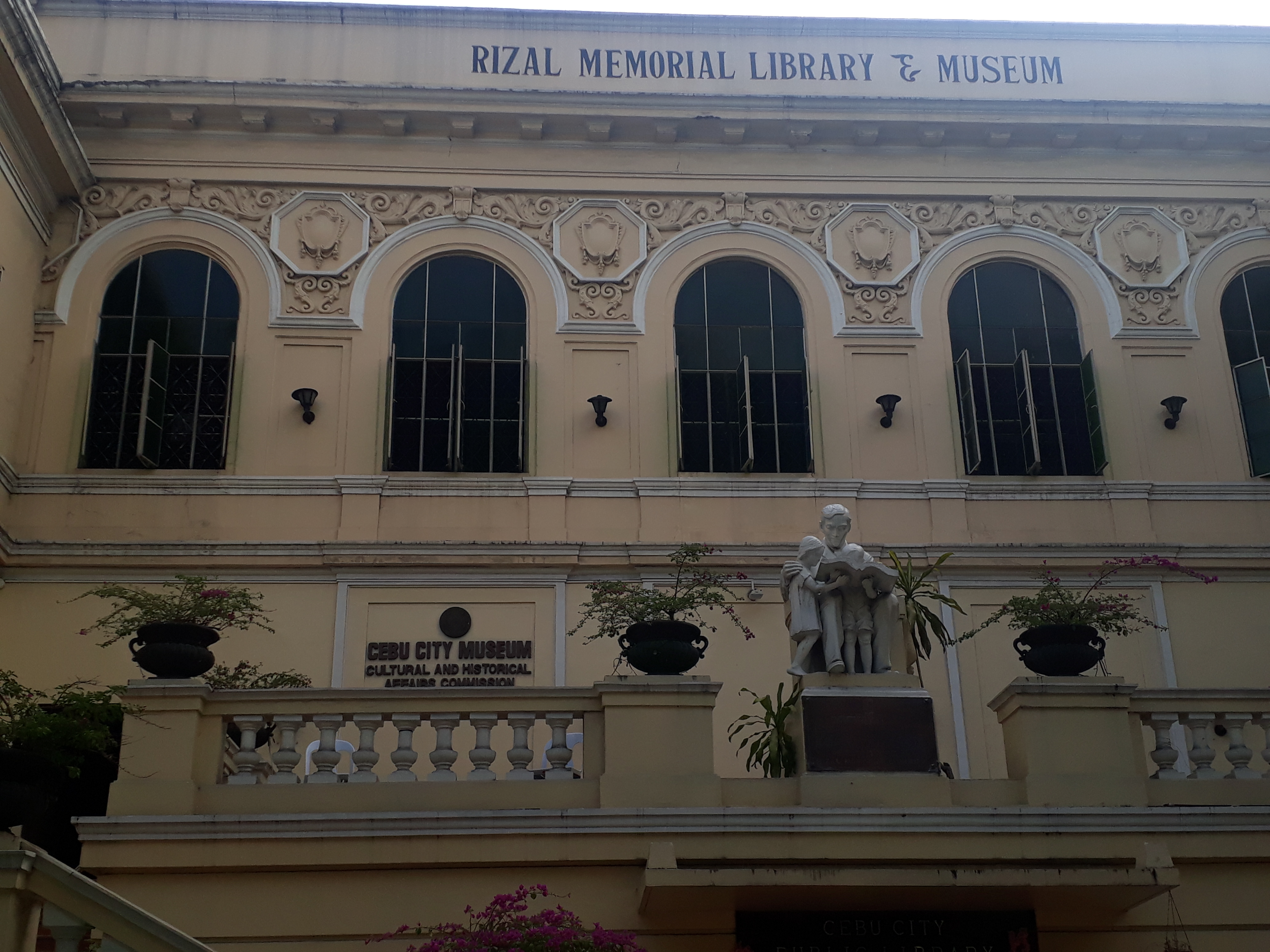
Details on the facade of Rizal Memorial Library and Museum

Filipino statesman Don Sergio Osmeña donated a property near Fuente Osmeña for the project. The design of the three-story building was created by the Manila-based architect Juan Marcos Arellano, who was also responsible with the design and construction of the Cebu Provincial Capitol. It featured the iconic sculpture of Rizal with an open book flanked with two children.

Construction began during the term of Cebu governor Sotero Cabahug. On December 30, 1939, coinciding with Rizal's 43rd death anniversary, the building was inaugurated under the administration of Governor Buenaventura Rodriguez and known as Rizal Memorial Library. When it was completed, all three floor spaces were designated as library areas.

A plaque, donated by Don Ramon Aboitiz through Los Tocayos de Rizal, was installed as the marker of the building upon its inauguration. The dedication reads:

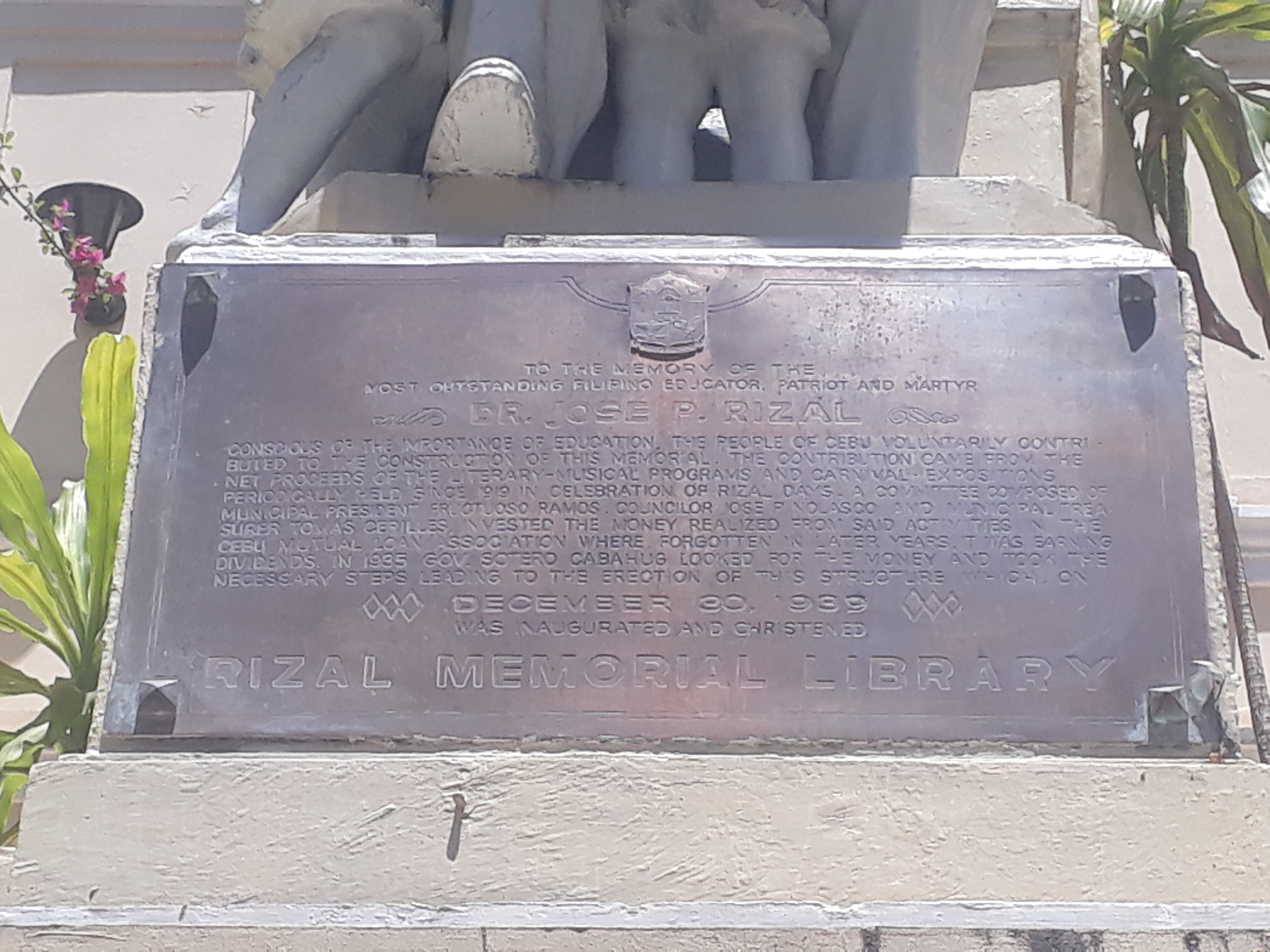
A bronze marker at the foot of Jose Rizal statue.

To the memory of the most outstanding Filipino educator, patriot and martyr, Dr. Jose . Rizal. Conscious of the importance of education, the people of Cebu voluntarily contributed to the construction of this memorial. The contribution came from net proceeds of the literary-musical programs and Carnival Expositions periodical held since 1919 in celebration of Rizal days. A committee composed of municipal president Fructuoso Ramos, Councilor Jose P. Nolasco, and municipal treasurer Tomas Cerilles invested the money realized from the said activities in the Cebu Mutual Loan Association where forgotten in later years, it was earning dividends. In 1935, Gov. Sotero Cabahug looked for the money and took the necessary steps leading to the erection of this structure which on December 30, 1939 was inaugurated and christened. Rizal Memorial Library. (Sic)

=== World War II ===
Upon the arrival of the Japanese Imperial Army during World War II, the Japanese forces utilized the building as their headquarters. The books from the library, which were extensive with copies unavailable in the National Library in Manila, were moved to the Cebu Provincial Capitol, or tossed away. Towards the end of World War II, the building was subjected to bombings by the American forces.

=== Post-war ===
The building became the seat of the city government after the war while the city hall was being rehabilitated. The government, which was preoccupied with restoring order, later allocated ₱40,000 for the building's restoration amidst public demand. The library was relocated while repairs were ongoing. Donated books and references from the United States Information Service rebuilt its collections as many original books were lost or irreparably damaged.

In the 1940s, Perpetual Succour Hospital rented the building for a nominal fee of ₱50, and then moved out in 1959. The City Health Department (CHD) later occupied the building in the 1960s while the library was moved to the third floor and eventually to another location. The library only moved back in the 1980s when the CHD relocated to its own building and after repair works that were funded by the government were done.

The lot where the building stands was officially donated by the provincial government under the administration of then Governor Emilio Osmeña to the city government, which was led by then mayor Tomas Osmeña. It was during this time that the museum was created.

=== In the 2000s ===
The city government unveiled a plan to renovate the building in 2008, but it was met with controversy as it was also announced that the library would be dissolved and its collection donated to satellite libraries. The ensuing public outcry stopped the plans of abolishing the public library.

The building underwent renovation funded by the Cultural and Historical Affairs Foundation, Inc. which donated ₱2.75 million, and the city government which gave financial assistance of P11 million, for a total project cost of P13.75 million. Repairs and renovation works commenced in August 2010. The building was reopened on May 8, 2011, the 150th birth anniversary of Rizal.

The Rizal Memorial Library and Museum houses the Sinulog Hall on the third floor, the Cebu City Museum of Visual Arts on the second floor, and the Cebu City Public Library on the ground floor. It is also the location for the offices of Cebu City Tourism Commission and the city's Cultural and Historical Affairs Commission.

== Cebu City Public Library ==
Also known as the Rizal Memorial Library, the Cebu City Public Library is located on the ground floor of the Rizal Memorial Library and Museum. Established in 1919, it began as the Philippine Library's branch in Cebu and Museum (presently National Library of the Philippines). It has free Wi-Fi internet connection available to users, offers dedicated services for LGBTQIA members and the hearing-impaired, and is the first public library in the country that is open 24/7.

== Cebu City Museum of Visual Arts ==
Occupying the second floor, Cebu City Museum displays antiques, sculptures, furniture, and woodcarvings given by prominent Cebuano families. It also contains works of art such as portraits of notable Cebuano people and paintings that show Cebu, its people and lifestyle during the 1500s until the Japanese occupation.

== Sinulog Hall ==
Named after Cebu City's annual festival every January, the Sinulog Hall is located on the third floor and dedicated for cultural and historical functions. Rehabilitation is underway to convert the Sinulog Hall to become a study area and a venue for events and other functions.
