= Sangdugong Panaguinip =

Filipino opera

Sandugong Panaginip
- Opera by Ladislao Bonus
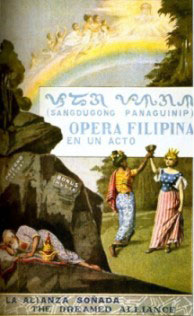
- Translation: The Dream Alliance
- Librettist: Roman G. Reyes
- Language: Tagalog
- Based on: La Alianza Soñada by Pedro Paterno
- Premiere: August 2, 1902; Zorrilla Theatre, Manila, Philippine Islands

Sangdugong Panaguinip or Sandugong Panaguinip (English: The Dreamed Alliance, Baybayin:ᜐᜇᜄ ᜉᜈᜄᜈ) is a Philippine opera which is regarded as the first to be done in the Tagalog language.

== Synopsis ==
Set in the 16th century in the banks of the Pasig River, Muslim pirates come to the area (around Modern day Pasig, Cainta, and Antipolo) to claim maidens as their tribute. Lapu witnesses an alliance between the people of the Philippines and the United States in a dream which could lead to the rescue of the maidens.

== Background ==
=== Composition ===
The opera was composed by Ladislao Bonus in the Tagalog language, the first in Philippine opera history, and was based on a translation made by Roman G. Reyes of Pedro Paterno's La Alianza Soñada, a Spanish libretto. It had a single act with five scenes.

=== Music ===
"Sampaguita" ("Flor de Manila") was among the more popular songs used in the opera which was composed by Dolores Paterno."Marca Hispanica", "Lupang Hinirang", and '"The Star-Spangled Banner", national anthems of the Spain, the Philippines, and the United States were also incorporated in the opera.

=== Performance history ===
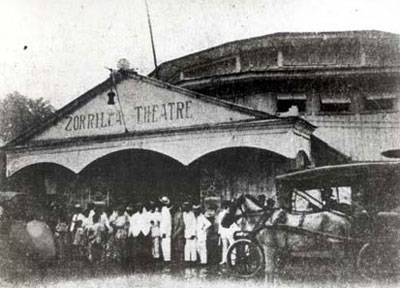
The Zorilla Theatre in 1917.

Sandugong Panaguinip had its premiere on August 2, 1902 at the Zorrilla Theatre in Manila. The Molina-Benito Company staged the initial performance of the opera. The opera had subsequent performances for more than a week with Governor General William H. Taft often in attendance although the opera only had five performances according to publications.

== Adaptations ==
Walter H. Loving, founder of the Philippine Constabulary Band, made an English-language adaptation of the opera which was entitled The Dream Alliance.
