= Ladislao Bonus =

Filipino composer (1854–1908)

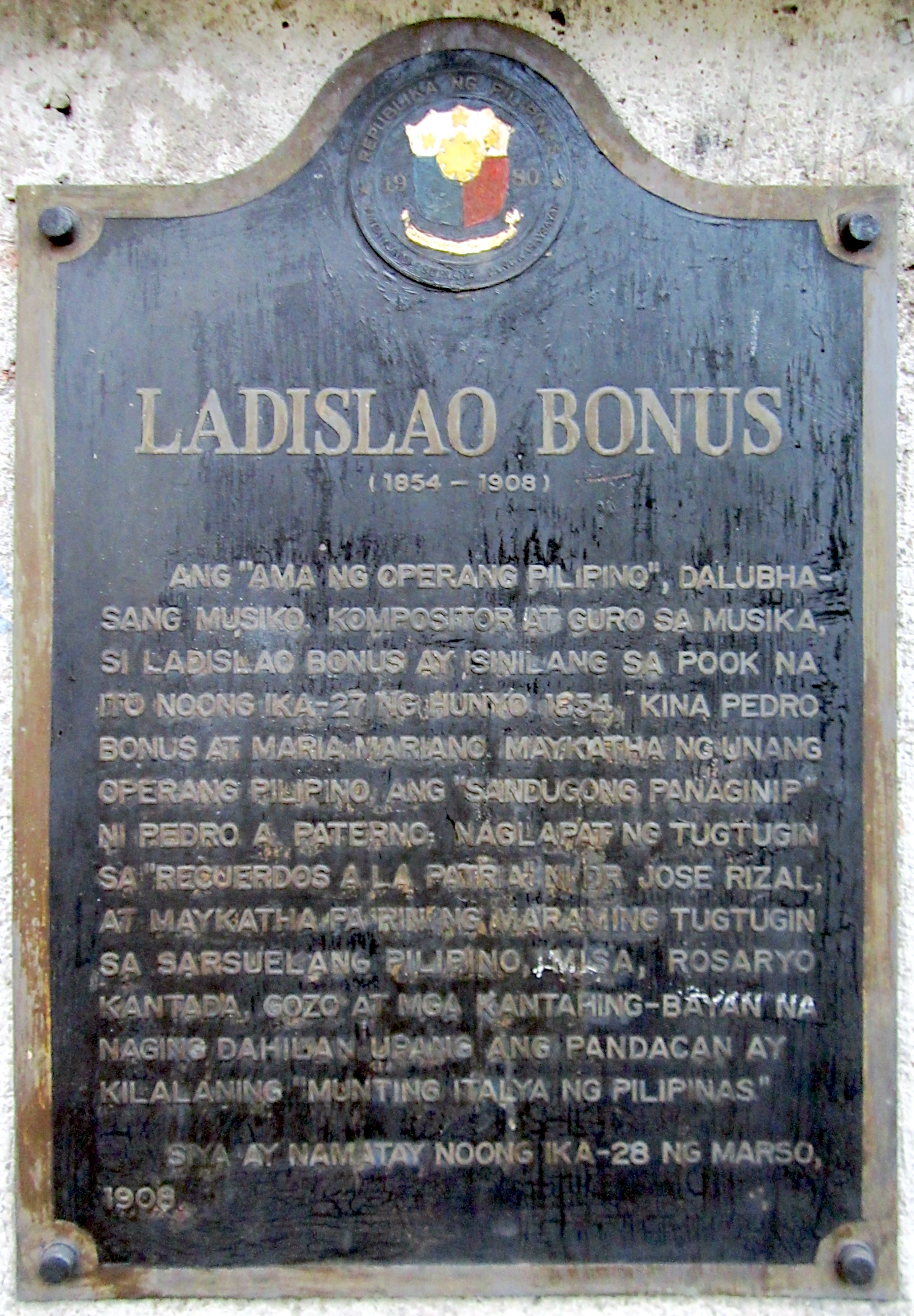
National historical marker installed in 1980 at Bonus's birthplace in Pandacan, Manila

Ladislao Bonus y Mariano (June 27, 1854 – March 28, 1908) was a Filipino composer, conductor, contrabass player, and teacher. His pioneering work on musical drama earned him the title of "Father of the Filipino opera".

== Biography ==
The eldest son of Pedro Bonus and Maria Mariano, he was born in Pandacan on June 27, 1854. He acquired his first lessons in music from Gregorio de Luna and Guillermo de Luna. Motivated by a strong desire to learn, he became so proficient with the violin, cello and viola that he could easily substitute for a player of any of those stringed instruments. He mastered the contrabass and served in the orchestra every time a foreign opera company visited Manila.

In 1887, Bonus organized a complete opera company in Pandacan. It was composed entirely of Tagalog musicians and singers, to wit: Teodora San Luis and Josefa Tiongson, sopranos; Victoria Madina, mezzo-soprano; Andres Ciria Cruz and Jose Conseco, basses; and Carmen Mendoza, Juana Natividad, Remegio Natividad, Rufina Bonus, Agustin Natividad, Marcela Barroga, Simon Natividad, Valentin Natividad, and Mariano Natividad, chorus members. Bonus served in the company as director and conductor of the orchestra. Jose Canseco was the stage director.

The group's maiden performance, which was held at the town's cockpit was a success. There followed invitations for it to perform in Manila. In the capital city, the segundo cabo of the colonial government, Antonio Morto, became one of the opera's zealous supporters. The Manila performances of the group won the hearts of the city folks and established Bonus’ reputation in the field of music.

In 1888, Bonus joined the Manila Cathedral orchestra. He was the “soul and life” of the Women's Orchestra organized by Raymundo Fermin in Pandacan sometime in 1890. He gave private piano lessons to members of the rich and prominent families not only in Manila but also in the provinces. He conducted the Marikina Orchestra, the Pasig Band, and the Arevalo Band of Quiapo. Under his direction, the Arevalo Band won first prize during the Regional Exposition in Hanoi in 1902. This band served the Revolutionary Government in Malolos in 1898–1899.

Bonus married Rosalia Guanzon, by whom he had eight children, namely, Rufina, Petronila, Angel, Leonisa, Benilda, Amado, Eloisa and Alfredo. He was at the height of his illustrious career when he died on March 28, 1908, at the age of 54.

== Selected works ==
=== Operas and sarswelas ===
- Sandugong Panaguinip (1902), opera in 1 act and 5 scenes. It was the first Philippine opera in the Tagalog Language.
- Unang Pagibig, sarswela, words by Eliseo Mendoza
- Ang Buhay, sarswela, words by Miguel Masilungan
- Buhay ng Lasing, sarswela
- several other Tagalog sarswelas

=== for Marching Band ===
- Pasa-doble Hanoi (1902), composed for the Hanoi exhibition at Hanoi, Vietnam
- Triumphal March, composed for the First Philippine Assembly.
- Los Dipotados

=== Songs ===
- Recuerdos a la Patria, or the song of Maria Clara from Jose Rizal's Noli me Tangere. Rizal himself requested Bonus to write the music for Maria Clara's song.
