= Bataan Nuclear Power Plant =

Nuclear power plant in the Philippines

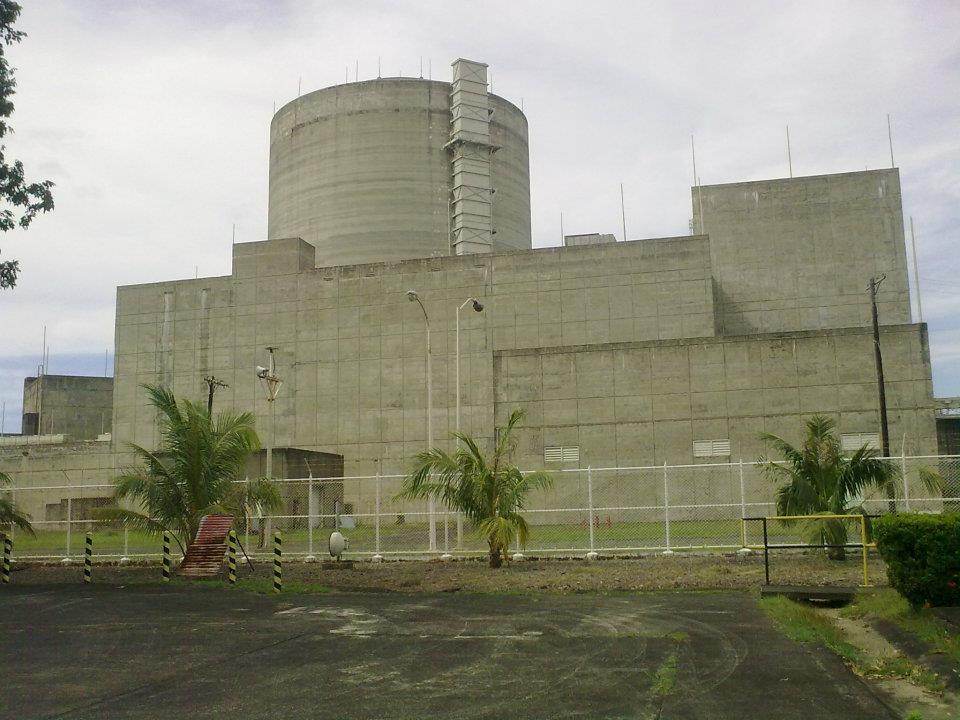
- The power plant in 2011
- Country: Philippines
- Location: Morong, Bataan
- Coordinates: 14°37′45″N 120°18′50″E
- Status: Completed, but never launched
- Construction began: 1976
- Construction cost: over US$2.3 billion
- Owner: National Power Corporation (NAPOCOR)

Nuclear power station
- Reactor type: PWR
- Reactor supplier: Westinghouse

Power generation
- Nameplate capacity: 621 MW

External links
- Commons: Related media on Commons

The Bataan Nuclear Power Plant (BNPP) is a nuclear power plant on the Bataan Peninsula, 100 kilometers (62 mi) west of Manila, Philippines. Completed but never fueled, it is located on a 3.57 km^{2} (1.38 sq mi) government reservation at Napot Point in Barangay Nagbalayong, Morong, Bataan. It was the Philippines' only attempt at building a nuclear power plant. It was mothballed due to safety concerns in the wake of the Chernobyl disaster in Ukraine in 1986 and issues regarding corruption in the Philippines.

== Background ==
In 1958, the Philippine nuclear program started with the creation of the Philippine Atomic Energy Commission (PAEC). In July 1973, under a regime of martial law, Philippine President Ferdinand Marcos announced the decision to build a nuclear power plant. A presidential committee was set up to secure funding for two 620 megawatt nuclear reactors for the energy needs of Luzon. Marcos reasoned that this was in response to the 1973 oil crisis, as the Middle East oil embargo had put a heavy strain on the Philippine economy.

== Controversy ==
Two proposals were submitted by General Electric and Westinghouse Electric. General Electric submitted a proposal containing detailed specifications of the nuclear plant and an estimated US$700 million cost. Westinghouse submitted a lower cost estimate of US$500 million, but the proposal did not contain any detail or specification. The presidential committee tasked to oversee the project preferred General Electric's proposal. This was overruled by Marcos in June 1974, who signed a letter of intent awarding the project to Westinghouse, despite the absence of any specifications on their proposal. Similarly, Marcos disregarded the advice of the National Power Corporation, the government-owned and controlled corporation responsible for electricity in the Philippines.

The project was plagued with problems during construction, including the location, welding, cabling, pipes and valves, permits, and kickbacks, and setbacks such as the decline of Marcos's influence and the incident at the Three Mile Island nuclear reactor. By March 1975, Westinghouse's cost estimate ballooned to US$1.2 billion without much explanation. The final cost was $2.2 billion for a single reactor, producing half the power of the original proposal.

Many problems identified in earlier stages remained throughout construction, as reported by inspectors, though denied by Westinghouse. In 1976, the Philippine economy only had a GDP of US$17 billion and a government budget of US$1.5 billion. As such, the burden to the economy for a single project was deemed too heavy. The power plant would be responsible for 10% of the Philippine's external debt.

The Presidential Commission on Good Government (PCGG) later ordered Marcos crony Herminio Disini to return US$50.6 million in commissions he earned from the deal. Marcos received US$80 million in kickback from the project. The Office of the Solicitor General ruled that Marcos return ₱22.2 billion to the government for his conspiracy with Disini to defraud the government. In 2021, the Supreme Court of the Philippines ordered Disini, through his estate, to pay back the government over ₱1 billion in damages, affirming a 2012 Sandiganbayan decision.

In August 2023, the Supreme Court of the Philippines reduced from ₱1 billion to ₱100 million the temperate damages that Herminio T. Disini estate must pay for brokering the 1974 deal behind the now mothballed $2.3-billion Bataan Nuclear Power Plant.

== Construction ==
In 1976, construction on the Bataan Nuclear Power Plant began. Following the 1979 Three Mile Island accident in the United States, construction on the BNPP was stopped, and a safety inquiry into the plant revealed over 4,000 defects. Among the issues raised was that it was built near a major geological fault line and close to the then dormant Mount Pinatubo.

In November 1979, President Ferdinand Marcos stated via a decree that the continuation of the construction was not possible due to potential hazards to the health and safety of the public. However, the Marcos administration eventually supported the project.

In 1984, when the BNPP was nearly complete, its cost had reached US$2.3 billion. Equipped with a Westinghouse light water reactor, it was designed to produce 621 megawatts of electricity.

In February 1986, President Ferdinand Marcos was overthrown by the People Power Revolution. Days after the April 1986 Chernobyl disaster in what was then the Ukrainian Soviet Socialist Republic, the succeeding administration of President Corazon Aquino decided not to operate the plant. Among other considerations taken was the strong opposition from Bataan residents and Philippine citizens as well as concerns over the integrity of the construction. From 1989 to 1993, the Philippines experienced 8- to 12-hour rolling blackouts and power rationing.

The new government sued Westinghouse for alleged overpricing and bribery, but was ultimately rejected by a United States court. Debt repayment on the plant became the Philippine's single biggest debt obligation. Successive governments have looked at several proposals to convert the plant into an oil, coal, or gas-fired power station. These options have all been deemed less economically attractive in the long term than simply constructing new power stations.

=== Opposition ===
The Bataan Nuclear Power Plant was a focal point for anti-nuclear protests in the late 1970s and 1980s. The project was criticized for being a potential threat to public health, especially since the plant was located in an earthquake zone, connected to Mount Natib, a caldera volcano similar to Mount Pinatubo. According to the US Geological Survey National Earthquake Information Center, several earthquakes have occurred on Mount Natib from 1951 to 2016.

Following proposals submitted in 2017 by Korea Hydro & Nuclear Power Co. Ltd. and Russia's Rosatom to rehabilitate the plant, opposition to the nuclear plant also raised concerns related to safety and health issues, reliance on imported uranium, high waste, and the steep cost of decommissioning.

== Aftermath ==
=== 2000s ===
Despite never being commissioned, the plant has remained intact, including the nuclear reactor, and has continued to be maintained. In April 2007, the Philippine government completed paying off its obligations on the plant, more than 30 years after construction began.

In January 2008, Energy Secretary Angelo Reyes announced that an International Atomic Energy Agency (IAEA) eight-man team led by Akira Omoto inspected the Bataan Nuclear power station on rehabilitation prospects. In preparing their report, the IAEA made two primary recommendations. First, the power plant's status must be thoroughly evaluated by technical inspections and economic evaluations conducted by a committed group of nuclear power experts with experience in preservation management. Second, the IAEA mission advised the Philippine government on the general requirements for starting its nuclear power program, stressing that the proper infrastructure, safety standards, and knowledge be implemented. The IAEA's role did not extend to assessing whether the power plant is usable or how much the plant may cost to rehabilitate.

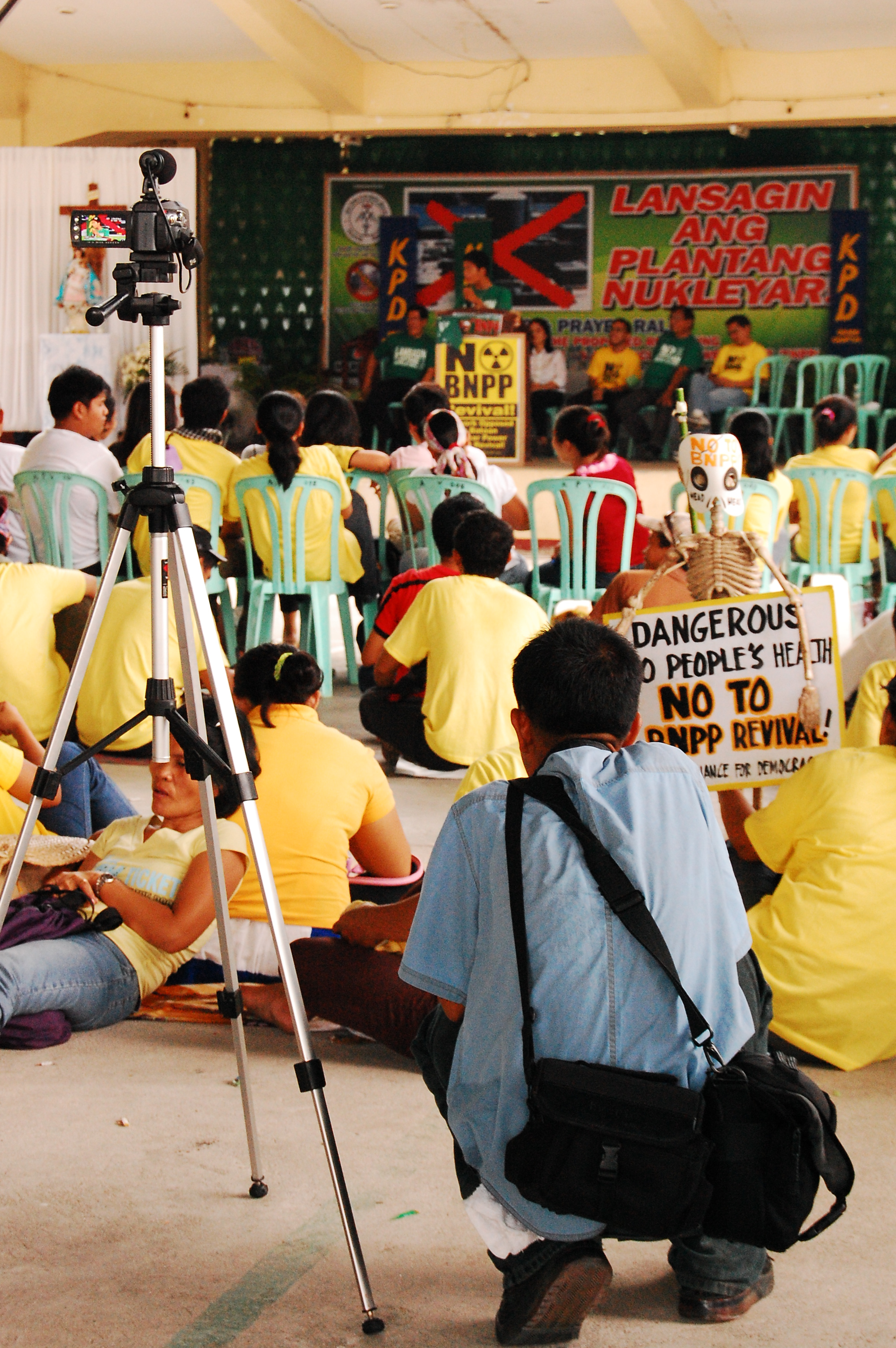
Critics of the Bataan Nuclear power plant at an assembly in a basketball court around the compound of the Morong Parish Church, 2009

Plans to reactivate the plant was questioned by critics, citing the need to consider people's safety, the plant's structural defects, the fact that the plant stands near a major earthquake fault, and the large sums of money the government would need to loan to revive the plant. Critics also alleged that the Bataan Nuclear Power Plant was being revived to become another source of government corruption. Opposition to the nuclear plant's revival came from Bataan and nearby provinces.

=== 2010s ===
In February 2010, NOEKOR started evaluating the financial plan of Korea Electric Power Corporation (KEPCO), assessing that it may cost US$1 billion to rehabilitate the nuclear plant. In February 2011, the Philippine government reimbursed the National Power Corporation (NAPOCOR) ₱4.2 billion (US$96 million) it spent for maintaining the Bataan Nuclear Power Plant. It requires an average of ₱40 million a year just to maintain it. In May 2011, it was announced that the plant would be turned into a tourist attraction.

In 2012, the Sandiganbayan graft court ordered entrepreneur and Marcos crony Herminio Disini to repay the Philippine government the amount of $50 million for his role in defrauding the country through the Bataan Nuclear Power Plant.

In 2016, various senators and a few media personnel inspected the Bataan Nuclear Power Plant for a possible bid to open it for public use. Inspecting senators told the media that the power plant was still in good condition. The Department of Energy was later given the go-ahead to look into the plant's rehabilitation. At least one senator has cautioned against reviving the nuclear power plant and stressed the need to consult scientists on the issue.

Citing risks associated with the presence of the Lubao Fault, an active earthquake fault running through the nearby Mount Natib, scientists have advised against reviving the nuclear plant. However, officials from the Philippine Institute of Volcanology and Seismology had declared the site of the plant is safe noting the facility's solid foundation and the dormancy of the nearby volcano Mount Natib.

In late 2017, representatives from Russia's Rosatom State Atomic Energy Corporation and Slovenia's GEN Energija went to assess the plant and make recommendations for its rehabilitation. They estimated rehabilitation costs between $3 billion to 4 billion and proposed steps for securing financing, drafting of relevant regulations, and training of technical personnel. They also recommended that the government consider constructing new nuclear power plants.

In an interview with CNN Philippines in April 2018, the Russian ambassador to the Philippines commented that he believed that revival of the plant would not be possible due to its outdated design. In contrast, Rosatom's vice president for Southeast Asia, Egor Simonov, stated that it would be possible to revive the plant, noting its "relatively good condition" despite decades of disuse. However, Simonov added that reviving the nuclear power plant may not be cost-effective.

In 2019, the Department of National Defense expressed its support for the revival of the nuclear power plant. The Philippine Nuclear Research Institute also urged the government to revive the power plant.

=== 2020s ===
Amid the 2021–2023 global energy crisis, President Bongbong Marcos, in his 2022 State of the Nation address, expressed his wish for the Philippines to revive research into nuclear power.

In 2022, the Biden administration committed to increased cooperation with the Philippines on nuclear power planning, including allowing American nuclear technology to be sold to the Philippines. Marcos allies and staunch supporters of the BNPP, including Representative Mark Cojuangco welcomed the news, noting that they were also open to seeking assistance from China and South Korea. However, energy analysts including Bert Dalusung and Gerry Arances said the nuclear power plant might be less important for government funding priorities than building out a system of distributed renewables, pointing to their emerging cheapness. Local lawyers and activists such as Derek Cabe and Dante Ilaya have also vowed to fight the revival of the BNPP. Scientists organization Advocates of Science and Technology for the People (Agham) said that the BNPP would not solve the energy crisis and that plans for the BNPP's revival "denies the fact that the BNPP is already antiquated, faulty, dangerous and has served as a milking cow for corrupt practices".

In October 2024, an agreement was announced between the Department of Energy and Korea Hydro & Nuclear Power where the latter will conduct a feasibility study for the rehabilitation of the nuclear plant at no cost of the Philippine government.

Marcos' only son and namesake Bongbong Marcos in a working visit in Singapore and to watch its Grand Prix, says he was dismayed on it being stopped before it could begin operations.

== See also ==
- Nuclear power in the Philippines
- Philippine Research Reactor-1
- Zwentendorf Nuclear Power Plant - An Austrian reactor that never entered service
