= Cebu City Public Library =

Library in the Philippines

Cebu City Public Library and Information Center
- 10°18′43.3″N 123°53′31.31″E
- Location: Philippines
- Established: 1919
- Reference to legal mandate: Act No. 96 of the Philippine Commission (passed March 5, 1901)
- Branches: none

Collection
- Items collected: Books; journals; newspapers; magazines; databases; maps; atlases
- Criteria for collection: Filipino literary and scholarly works (Filipiniana)

The Cebu City Public Library and Information Center traces its roots to the Cebu Branch Library of the Philippine Library and Museum, now the National Library of the Philippines. It was organized and opened to the public on April 13, 1919, by Guillermo Restun, the chief librarian from the Ilo-ilo branch. The province of Cebu took charge of the initial collection and other maintenance and operating expenses. Since its establishment, the public library has been housed in many different buildings, until in 1938, a dedicated edifice, the Rizal Memorial Library and Museum, was inaugurated.

When World War II broke out, the library was closed. The building was utilized as headquarters by the Japanese Army, and books were either dumped, ruined, or stolen. In 1953, the institution was reopened due to public clamor. The Cebu City government appropriated a budget for the library collection and other operating expenses.

The Cebu City Public Library and Information Center began 24-hour operations on March 9, 2018, upon the directive of Mayor Tomas Osmeña—the nation's first public library to do so. Due to staff shortages, the library's working hours were reduced in 2019, and it was shut down entirely in March 2020, due to the COVID-19 pandemic. After reopening on a limited basis in September 2020, the library resumed 24-hour operations on June 30, 2025, following an electoral pledge by the newly inaugurated mayor of Cebu City, Nestor Archival.
