= List of records of the Philippines =

This is an annotated list of records of the Philippines organized by category.

== Finance ==
- Wealthiest individual person (Forbes' The World's Billionaires list): Enrique K. Razon, with a net worth of $16.5 billion in 2026. (currently 190th worldwide)

== Geography ==
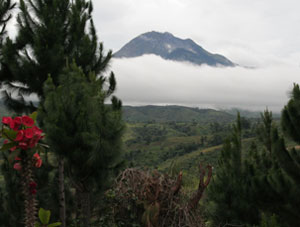
Mount Apo, the tallest peak in the Philippines

- The tallest mountain: Mount Apo, Mindanao, 2,954 meters (9,692 ft)
- The largest lake: Laguna de Bay, Luzon, 911–949 square kilometers (352–366 sq mi) surface area
- The largest island: Luzon, 109,965 square kilometers (42,458 sq mi)
- The longest river: Cagayan River, Cagayan Valley. 353 kilometers (219 mi)
- The longest underground river: Puerto Princesa Underground River, Palawan, 24-kilometer (15 mi) cave containing an 8.2-kilometer (5.1 mi) underground section of the Cabayugan River
- The highest waterfall: Aliwagwag Falls, Cateel, Davao Oriental, 340 meters (1,120 ft)
- The highest single-drop waterfall: Pagsanjan Falls, Cavinti, Laguna, 120 meters (390 ft) (highest drop)
- The highest temperature (as officially recorded by the PAGASA): Tuguegarao, Cagayan, 42.2 °C (108.0 °F), April 29, 1912 and May 11, 1969
- The lowest temperature (as officially recorded by the PAGASA): Baguio, 6.3 °C (43.3 °F), January 18, 1961 (Note: Reports by local news outlets regarding temperature in Mount Pulag, which is usually claimed to drop below zero during the cold months of December to February, cannot be verified by the PAGASA.)
- The strongest earthquake: 1976 Moro Gulf earthquake, Mw 8.0, August 16, 1976
- The deadliest earthquake: 1976 Moro Gulf earthquake, 4,791 deaths, August 16, 1976

== Political entities ==
Area

- Largest province: Palawan (excluding Puerto Princesa), 14,649.7 square kilometers (5,656.3 sq mi)
- Smallest province: Batanes, 219.01 square kilometers (84.56 sq mi)
- Largest city: Davao City, 2,444 square kilometers (944 sq mi) (20th largest in the world)
- Smallest city: San Juan, 5.95 square kilometers (2.30 sq mi)
- Largest municipality: Sablayan, Occidental Mindoro, 2,188.80 square kilometers (845.10 sq mi)
- Smallest municipality: Pateros, 1.76 square kilometers (0.68 sq mi)

Population

- Province with the largest population:
  - excluding highly urbanized cities: Cavite, 3,678,301 inhabitants (2015)
  - including highly urbanized cities: Cebu, 4,632,359 inhabitants (2015)
- Province with the smallest population: Batanes, 17,246 inhabitants (2015)
- City with the largest population: Quezon City, 2,936,116 inhabitants (2015)
- City with the smallest population: Palayan, Nueva Ecija, 41,041 (2015)
- City outside Metro Manila with the largest population: Davao City, 1,632,991 inhabitants (2015)
- Municipality with the largest population: Rodriguez, Rizal, 443,954 (2020)
- Municipality with the smallest population:
  - disputed territory: Kalayaan, Palawan, 184 inhabitants (2015)
  - undisputed: Ivana, Batanes, 1,327 inhabitants (2015)
- Barangay with the largest population: Barangay 176, Caloocan, 246,515 (2015)

Population density

- Province with highest population density: Cavite 2,455 inhabitants per square kilometer (6,360/sq mi) (2015)
- Province with lowest population density: Apayao 26 inhabitants per square kilometer (67/sq mi) (2015)
- City with highest population density: Manila, 42,628 inhabitants per square kilometer (110,410/sq mi) (2015)
- City with lowest population density: Puerto Princesa, 107 inhabitants per square kilometer (280/sq mi) (2015)
- City outside Metro Manila with highest population density: Mandaue, 14,402 inhabitants per square kilometer (37,300/sq mi) (2015)
- Municipality with highest population density: Cainta, Rizal, 16,294 inhabitants per square kilometer (42,200/sq mi) (2015)
- Municipality with lowest population density:
  - disputed territory: Kalayaan, Palawan, 1 inhabitant per square kilometer (2.6/sq mi) (2015)
  - undisputed: Dinapigue, Isabela, 5 inhabitants per square kilometer (13/sq mi) (2015)

Number of barangays

- Province with most barangays: Iloilo, 1,721
- Province with fewest barangays: Batanes, 29
- City with most barangays: Manila, 897
- City with fewest barangays: Muntinlupa, 9
- Municipality with most barangays: Miagao, Iloilo, 119
- Municipality with fewest barangays:
  - disputed territory: Kalayaan, Palawan, 1
  - undisputed: Adams, Ilocos Norte, 1

Foundation date

- Oldest city: Cebu City, founded 1565

== Buildings and structures ==
Metrobank Center

=== Largest ===
- Largest artificial lake: Pantabangan Lake, Nueva Ecija, 69.62 square kilometers (27 mi^{2}) (max)
- Largest dam: San Roque Dam, Pangasinan, height 200 meters (660 ft), length 1,130 meters (3,710 ft)
- Largest indoor arena: Philippine Arena, Bocaue, Bulacan, 51,929 seats and 36,715 square meters (3.6715 ha) (also largest in the world)
- Largest maritime passenger terminal: Port of Calapan, Oriental Mindoro, 8,124 square meters (0.8124 ha)
- Largest shopping mall by gross leasable area: SM Mall of Asia, Pasay, Metro Manila, 589,981 square meters (6,350,500 sq ft) (6th largest in the world)

=== Longest ===
- Longest road network: Pan-Philippine Highway, 3,379.73 kilometers (2,100.07 mi)
- Longest bridge: Cebu–Cordova Link Expressway, Metro Cebu, 8.9 kilometers (5.5 mi)
- Longest expressway: Subic–Clark–Tarlac Expressway, Central Luzon, 93.77 kilometers (58.27 mi)
- Longest elevated expressway: Skyway Stage 3, Metro Manila, 18 kilometers (11 mi)

=== Tallest ===
- Tallest building: Metrobank Center, Taguig, Metro Manila, 318 meters (1,043 ft)
- Tallest twin building: One Shangri-La Place Towers, Mandaluyong, Metro Manila, 227 meters (745 ft) (17th tallest in the world)
- Tallest statue: Mother of All Asia – Tower of Peace, Batangas City, Batangas, 98.15 meters (322.0 ft)
- Tallest bamboo statue: St. Vincent Ferrer Statue, Bayambang, Pangasinan, 50.23 meters (164.8 ft) (also tallest in the world)

=== Widest ===
- Widest road: Commonwealth Avenue, Quezon City, Metro Manila, 95 meters (312 ft) at its widest point

== Others ==
- Shortest man: Junrey Balawing, 59.93 cm (1 ft 11 1/2 in) (was also shortest living person in the world)
- Largest serving of balut: Pateros, 117.5 kilograms (259 lb).
- Largest attended papal gathering: Mass by Pope Francis in Rizal Park, Manila on January 18, 2015, attended by 6–7 million people (also largest in the world)
- Largest banknote: ₱100,000 bill, launched in 1998, dimensions of 356mm width and 216mm height
- Largest gong ensemble in the world, which was participated by 3,440 people in Tabuk, Kalinga in February 2023
- Largest banga dance in the world, which was participated by 4,681 people in Tabuk, Kalinga in February 2023. The dance uses ‘bangas’ or clay pots, which is used to carry water and balanced in the head
- Highest attendance in the FIBA Basketball World Cup, which was attended by 38,115 spectators at the Philippine Arena on August 25, 2023

== See also ==
- List of firsts in the Philippines
- List of Filipino records in athletics
- List of Filipino records in Olympic weightlifting
- List of Filipino records in swimming
- List of Filipino records in track cycling
