= Deo Florence Onda =

Filipino microbial oceanographer

- Born: Brooke's Point, Palawan
- Citizenship: Filipino
- Education: University of the Philippines Baguio (BS); University of the Philippines Diliman (MS); Laval University (Ph.D)
- Known for: First Filipino to descent to Emden Deep; among the first two people to do so (with Victor Vescovo)
- Scientific career
- Fields: Microbial oceanography
- Workplaces: University of the Philippines Marine Science Institute

Deo Florence L. Onda is a Filipino microbial oceanographer. He is known for being the first Filipino to descend into the Emden Deep in the Philippine Trench.

== Early life and education ==
Onda was born in Brooke's Point, Palawan. He earned his Interuniversity PhD in Oceanography from the Université Laval in Quebec City, Canada. He did his post-doctoral fellowship at the Alfred Wegener Institute in Bremerhaven, Germany.

== Career ==
=== University of the Philippines ===
Onda is an associate professor at the University of the Philippines Marine Science Institute (UP MSI); the youngest faculty member of the institution as of March 2021.

=== Protect WPS ===
Onda was the chief scientist of the Protect WPS (Predicting Responses between Ocean Transport and Ecological Connectivity of Threatened ecosystems in the West Philippine Sea) expedition group which conducted research in the Spratly Islands in 2019. The expedition noted "relatively unhealthy" conditions of reefs in Thitu Island and the Sabina Shoal. The research also noted new sightings of seaweed species previously unrecorded in the area and also collected six crates of trash from the sea. The expedition used the RV Kasarinlan, a research marine vessel owned by UP MSI.

=== Emden Deep expedition ===
Victor Vescovo's Caladan Oceanic initiated an expedition to the Emden Deep, the deepest point in the Philippine Trench and third deepest in the world. Deo Florence Onda was invited to join Vescovo in the expedition's descent to the Emden Deep which would make Onda, the first Filipino to make a descent to the deep. The expedition started off in Guam on March 15, with Vescovo and Onda on board the DSSV Pressure Drop where they would be deployed in a separate submersible vehicle, the DSV Limiting Factor. Onda agreed to take part in the expedition to " assert the sovereign rights" of the Philippines over the underwater feature. The descent took place on March 23. At Emden Deep, Onda waved the Philippine flag.

There is a children's book named Ang Doktor ng Dagat based on his work.
