= Philippine Research Reactor-1 =

Defunct nuclear research reactor in Quezon City, Philippines

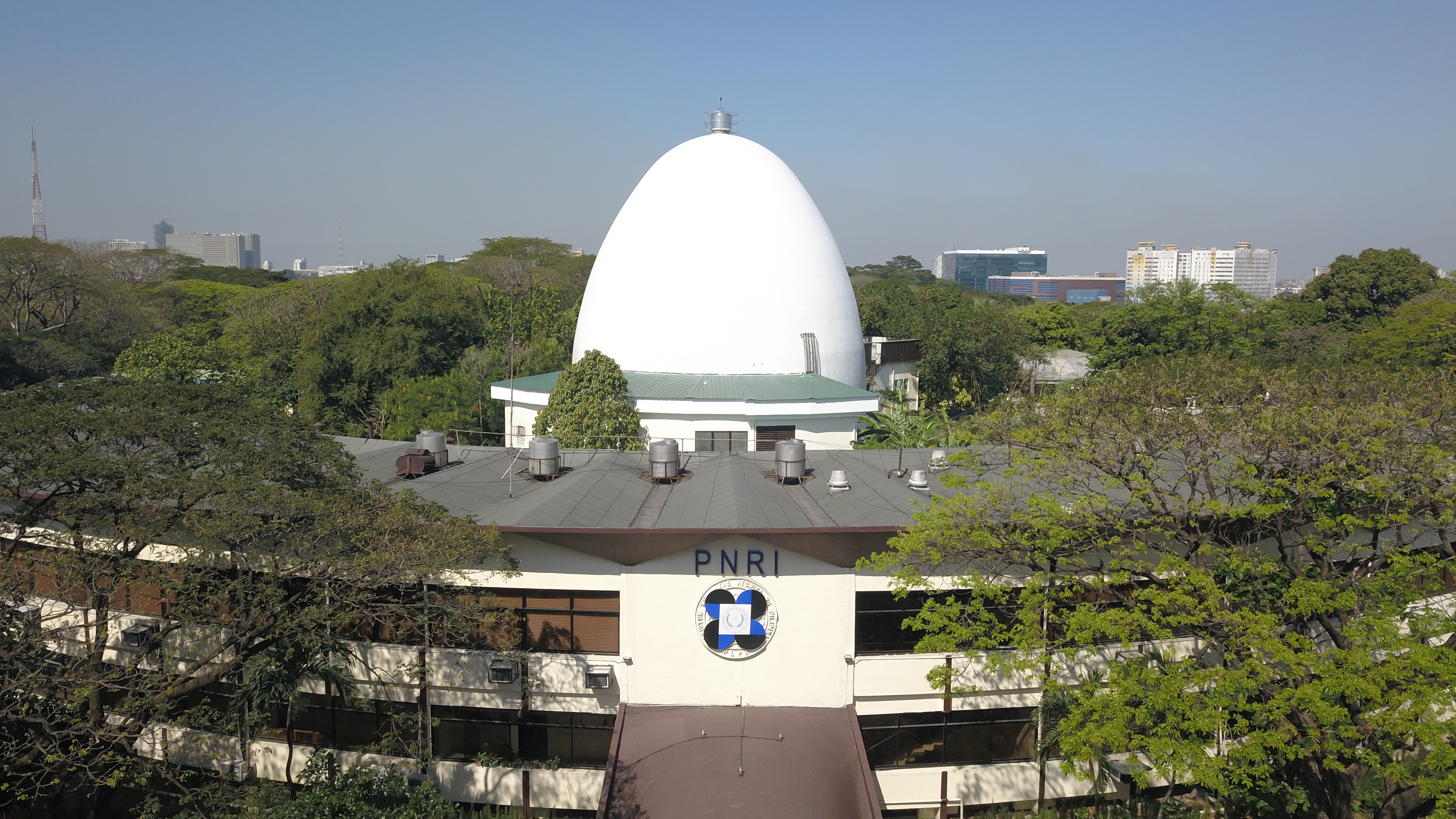
- Operating institution: Philippine Nuclear Research Institute
- Location: University of the Philippines Diliman, Quezon City
- Coordinates: 14°39′37″N 121°3′21″E
- Type: Research reactor
- Power: 0 MW (3 MW; old reactor)

Construction and upkeep
- First criticality: N/A (current subcritical reactor); August 26, 1963 (old reactor)
- Shutdown date: 1988 (Note: Shutdown date of the TRIGA Mark III critical reactor. A subcritical reactor became operational in its place in 2022.)

The Philippine Research Reactor-1 (PRR-1) is a research reactor that is owned and maintained by the Philippine Nuclear Research Institute (PNRI) in Quezon City, Philippines. The PRR-1 is the first nuclear reactor and the only operating nuclear facility in the Philippines. The PRR-1 initially operated as a critical reactor from 1963 to 1988 and the facility became dormant for 34 years. A new subcritical reactor, the Subcritical Assembly for Training, Education, and Research (SATER), was set up within the facility which was first loaded with nuclear rods in June 2022.

== History ==
=== Original facility ===
The Philippine Research Reactor-1 was built under the Atoms for Peace nuclear research exchange program of the United States. The reactor which had its first criticality on August 26, 1963, was built by U.S. firm General Atomics and was originally a 1 MW MTR-type open pool general-purpose reactor. It was successfully operated from 1964 to 1984 and was utilized for training and research in nuclear science as well as for isotope production.

In 1984, the Philippine Atomic Energy Commission (PAEC; then name of the Philippine Nuclear Research Institute (PNRI)) decided to convert and upgrade the reactor into a 3 MW TRIGA Mark III reactor. The converted reactor achieved criticality in April 1988. The converted PRR-1 TRIGA reactor used low-enriched uranium instead of highly enriched uranium. After its conversion, technical and administrative problems rendered the facility inoperable, which resulted in its extended shutdown. In 2005, it was initially decided that the reactor would be decommissioned.

=== SATER facility ===
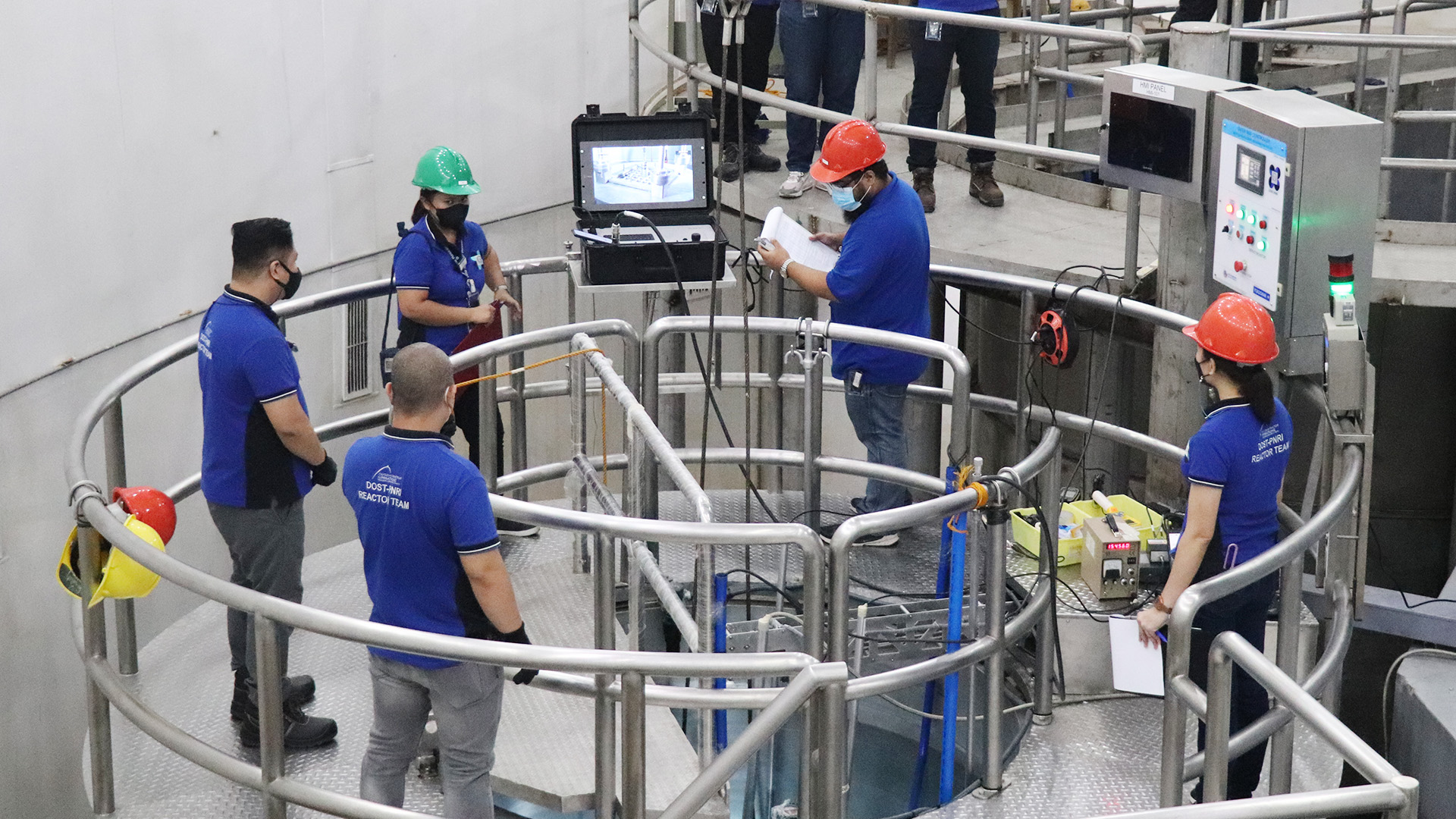
The fuel being lowered into the core of the SATER reactor, 2022

The PNRI with the help of the International Atomic Energy Agency set up a new subcritical reactor with zero-power configuration, the Subcritical Assembly for Training, Education, and Research (SATER) facility. The SATER project was conceptualized in 2014, but actual work on it only began in 2017.

After 34 years of the PRR-1 being left unused, the commissioning process of the SATER began when it was loaded with 44 nuclear rods on June 20, 2022. SATER is meant as a training reactor for research reactor operators, regulators and users. The SATER became fully operational by March 9, 2023. The PNRI's Nuclear Regulatory Division has granted authorization for the PRR-1 SATER's operation.

== See also ==
- Bataan Nuclear Power Plant
- Philippine Nuclear Research Institute
