= Philippine Nuclear Research Institute =

Agency of the Philippine government

- Logo of PNRI

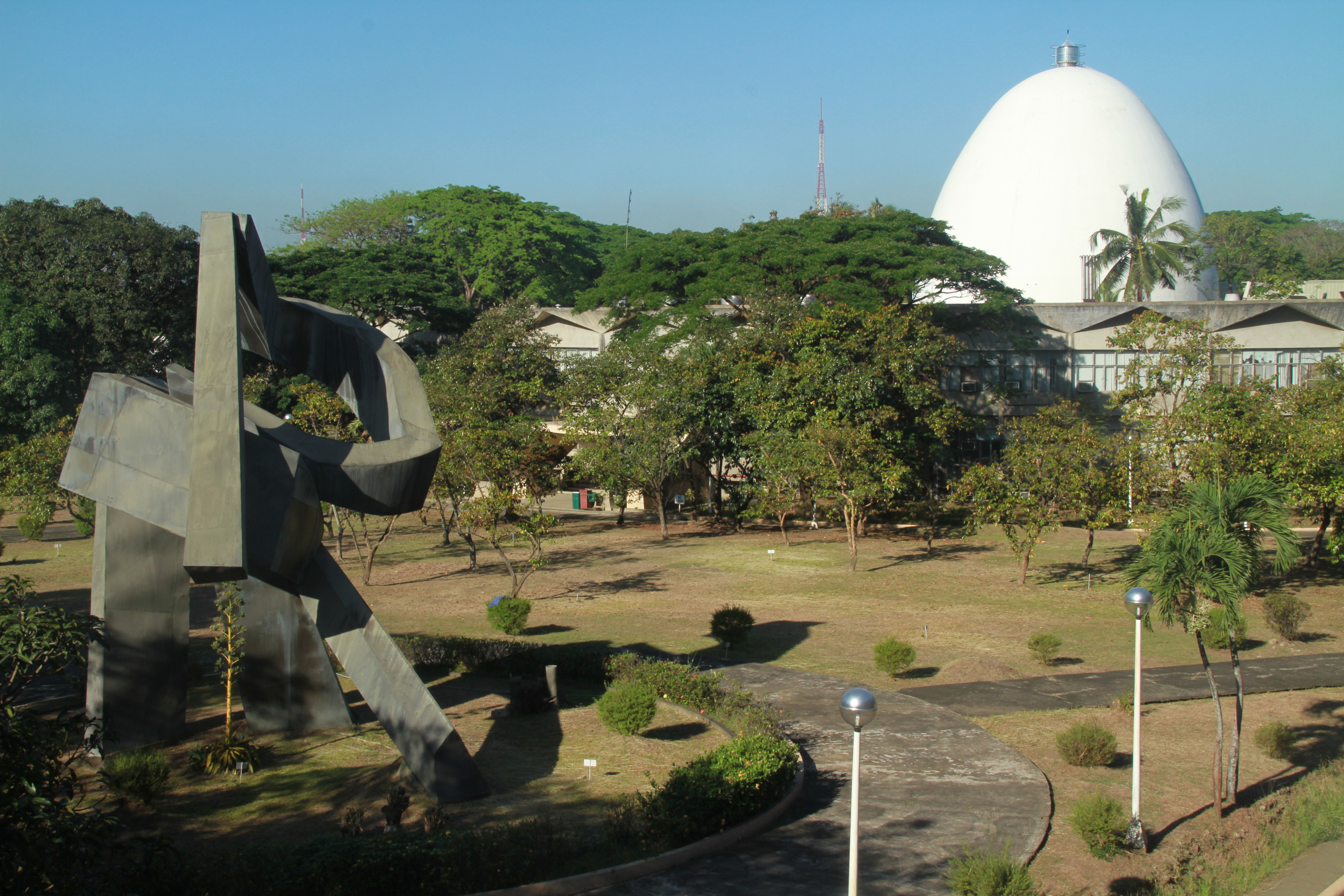
- (Left): Humane Growth of Nuclear Sciences monument by Eduardo Castrillo (Right): Philippine Research Reactor - 1, designed by Crescensiano de Castro

Institute overview
- Formed: June 13, 1958 (68 years ago)
- Preceding Institute: Philippine Atomic Energy Commission (PAEC)
- Jurisdiction: Philippines
- Headquarters: Commonwealth Avenue, Diliman, Quezon City; 14°39′40.36″N 121°3′20.52″E
- Employees: 225 (2024)
- Annual budget: ₱353.39 million (2021)
- Institute executive: Carlo Arcilla, Director
- Parent department: Department of Science and Technology
- Parent Institute: Research and Development Institute
- Website: pnri.dost.gov.ph

The Philippine Nuclear Research Institute (PNRI; Filipino: Surian ng Pilipinas sa Pananaliksik Pang-nuclear) is a government agency under the Department of Science and Technology mandated to undertake research and development activities in the peaceful uses of nuclear energy, institute regulations on the said uses, and carry out the enforcement of said regulations to protect the health and safety of radiation workers and the general public.

== Functions ==
The Philippine Nuclear Research Institute (PNRI) is an agency of the government that is authorized to regulate the safe and peaceful applications of nuclear science and technology in the Philippines.

Under Executive Order 128, s. 1987, the PNRI is mandated to perform the following functions:

1. Conduct research and development on the application of radiation and nuclear techniques, materials and processes.
2. Undertake the transfer of research results to end-users, including technical extension and training services.
3. Operate and maintain nuclear research reactors and other radiation facilities.
4. License and regulate activities relative to production, transfer and utilization of nuclear radioactive substances.

== Structure ==
Under Executive Order 128, s. 1987, the PNRI is headed by a director assisted by a deputy director. The institute is composed of four technical divisions and one administrative/finance division.

The five divisions provide the Institute with research, nuclear-related, policy development, budgetary assistance, and technology development services respectively:

Five divisions of the PNRI
Division	Scope
Atomic Research	Agriculture Research Section, Biomedical Research Section, Health Physics Research Section, Applied Physics Research Section, Chemistry Research Section, and Nuclear Materials Research Section
Nuclear Services	Nuclear Reactor Operations Section, Engineering Services Section, Irradiation Services Section, Nuclear Analytical Techniques and Applications Section, Isotope Techniques Section, and Radiation Protection Services Section
Nuclear Regulatory	Regulations and Standards Development Section, Inspection and Enforcement Section, Licensing, Review, and Evaluation Section, Nuclear Safeguards and Security Section, and Radiological Impact Assessment Section
Finance and Administrative	Budget Section, Cash Section, Accounting Section, Property and Procurement Section, Human Resources and Management and Records and Communication Section, and General Services Section
Technology Diffusion	International Cooperation Section, Nuclear Training Center, Nuclear Information and Documentation Section, Management Information System Section, and Business Development Section

A total of 263 permanent positions make up the PNRI organization.

== History ==
In 1958, the Philippine Atomic Energy Commission (PAEC) was established under Republic Act No. 2067, also known as the Science Act of 1958. In the early 1960s, the PAEC built the Philippine Research Reactor-1, the first nuclear reactor in the Philippines. The Atomic Energy Regulatory and Liability Act of 1968 established the regulatory function and mandate of the PAEC, whereas on December 13, 1974, Presidential Decree No. 606 established the PAEC as an independent and autonomous body. Three years later, Presidential Decree No. 1206 of October 6, 1977, created the Ministry of Energy (MOE). From the MoE, the Philippine Atomic Energy Commission was transferred back to the Office of the President Executive under Order No. 613 on August 15, 1980, and transferred again to the Office of the Prime Minister under Executive Order No. 708 of July 2, 1981. In 1984, the PAEC was placed within the administrative administration of the Department of Science and Technology under Executive Order No. 784. The Philippine Atomic Energy Commission became the Philippine Nuclear Research Institute (PNRI) in 1987.

In 1995, the trial of the sterile insect technique (SIT) held in Guimaras was successful. In the succeeding year, William G. Padolina, secretary of the Department of Science and Technology, served as the president of the 40th General Conference of the International Atomic Energy Agency (IAEA). In celebration of the centennial of the discovery of radioactivity of 1997, the second Philippine Nuclear Congress was held in Manila.

At the beginning of the 21st century, the PNRI's Radiological Emergency Preparedness and Response Plan was approved in 2000. In 2001, the first positron emission tomography (PET) was licensed by the PNRI at St. Luke's Medical Center. Between 2001 and 2005, a polyvinylpyrrolidone carrageenan hydrogel dressing for burns and wounds was developed by the PNRI as well as the development of the mutant ornamental plants Kamuning dwarf mutant (Murraya 'Ibarra Santos'), Dracaena 'Marea' and Cordyline 'Medina'. In 2005, the PNRI was designated as the collaborating center for studies on harmful algal blooms by the IAEA. The next year, the Philippine Research Reactor at the PNRI was chosen by the IAEA to be the training platform to demonstrate the decommissioning process technique under the Research Reactor Decommissioning Demonstration Project (R2D2P). The 9th Forum for Nuclear Cooperation in Asia Ministerial Level Meeting was hosted in the Philippines in 2008, the same year of the 50th Founding Anniversary of the Philippine Nuclear Research Institute.

The Philippines was named one of the three pilot countries for the IAEA Water Availability Enhancement Project (IWAVE) in 2010. The National Nuclear Security Plan and the IAEA INSSP also became operational at this time. In 2011, the Member States engaged in an RCA Regional project to study the disaster impact on the marine environment. The data was compiled in the Asia and Pacific Marine Radioactivity Database (ASPAMARD) which was managed by the Philippines through the PNRI. This was made in response to the Fukushima Daiichi nuclear disaster. In 2012, the Technetium-99m Generator Facility was commissioned. During 2013, the conditioning and storage of Spent High Activity Radioactive Sources (SHARS) was put to attention when the Philippines together with the IAEA and the South Africa Nuclear Energy Cooperation (NESCA) worked in a tripartite cooperation. In 2014, the PNRI Electron Beam Facility was inaugurated and the PNRI was able to conduct its first full exhibit of Filipino applications of nuclear science and technology at the 58th IAEA General Conference in Vienna, Austria

== Main activities ==
- Radiation therapy
- Nuclear power
- Peaceful Nuclear Research

== Facilities and laboratories ==
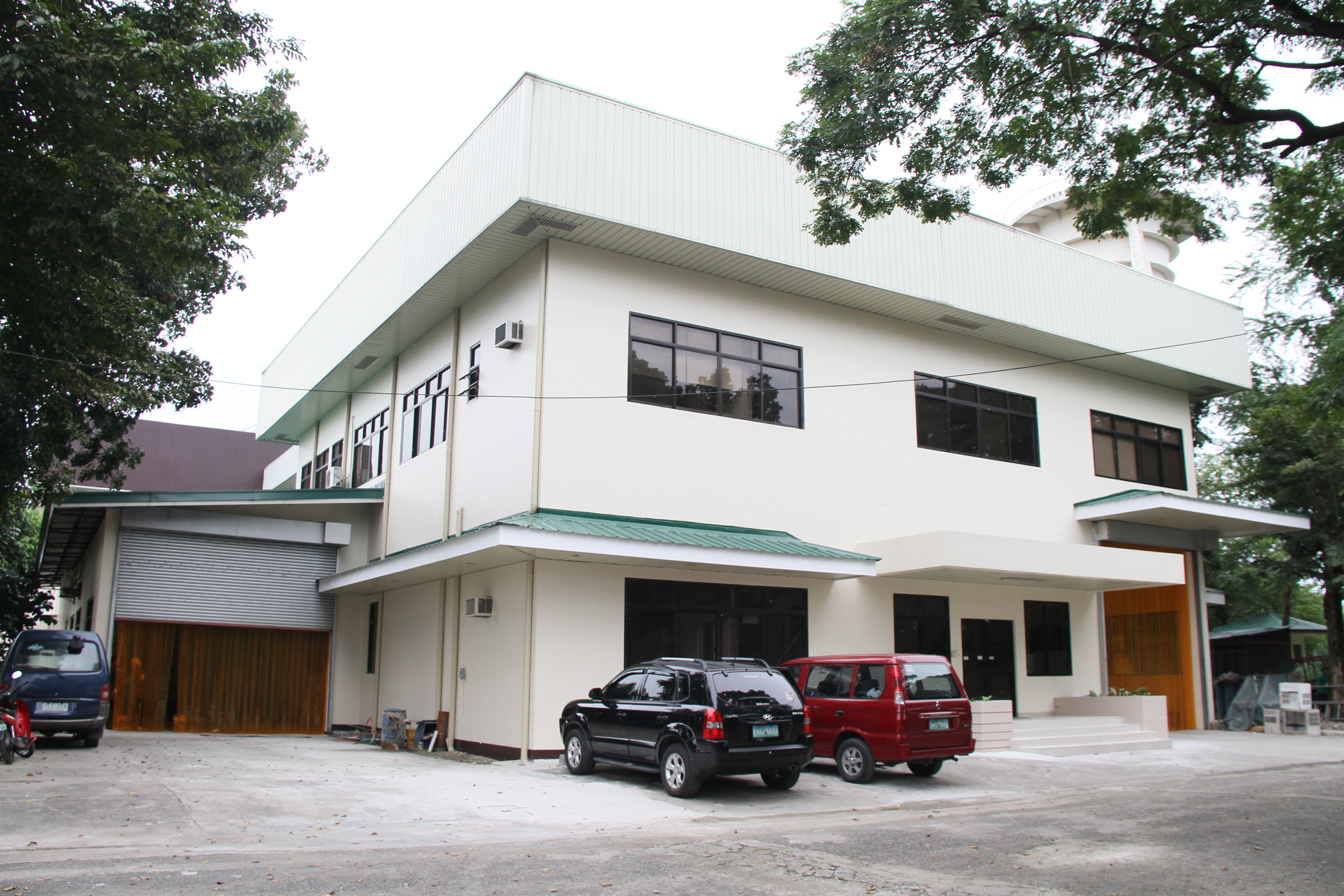
Cobalt-60 Multipurpose Irradiation Facility

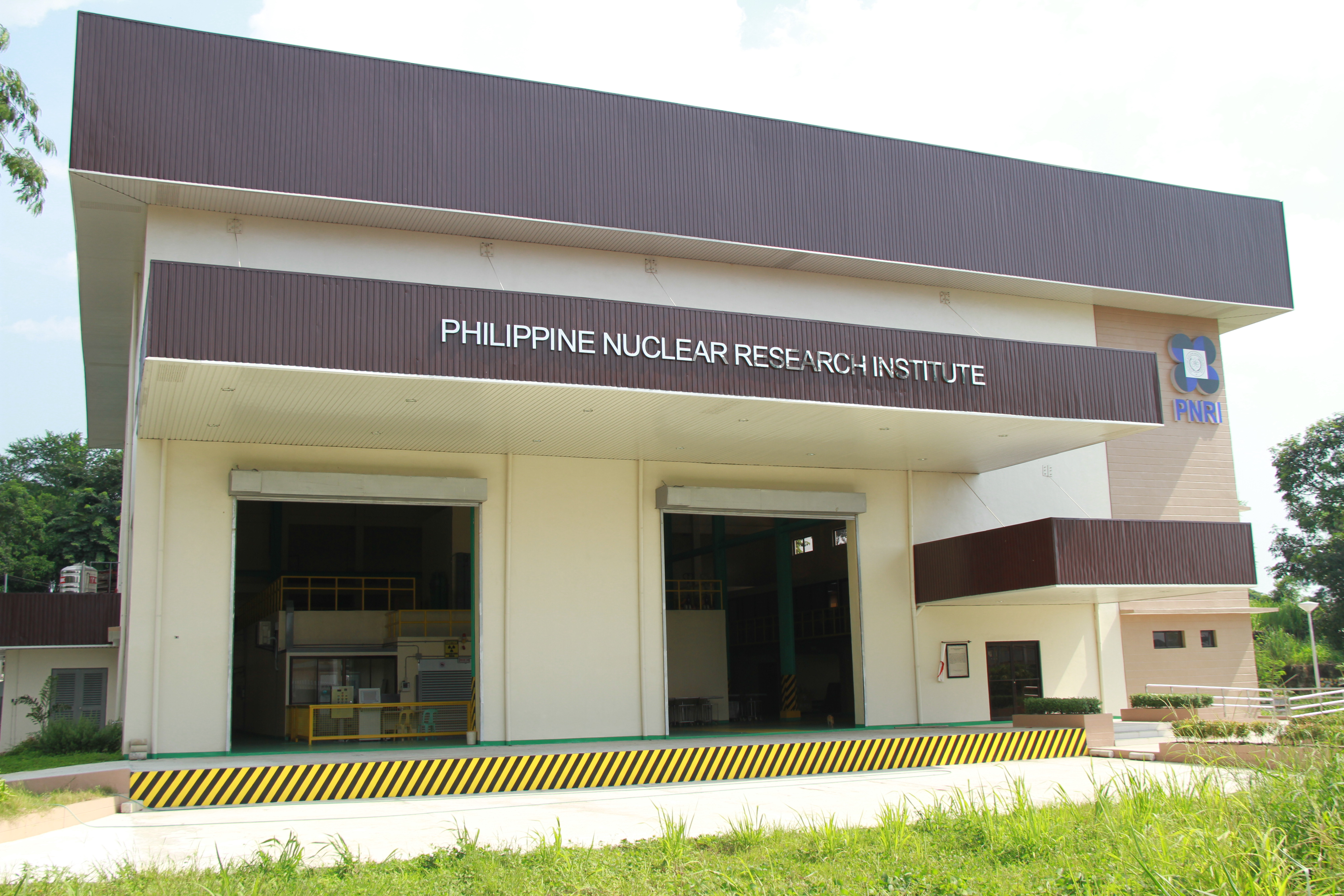
Electron Beam Irradiation Facility

- Philippine Research Reactor-1
- Cobalt-60 Multipurpose Irradiation Facility
- Electron Beam Irradiation Facility
- Technetium-99m Generator Facility
- Isotope Ratio Mass Spectrometry Laboratory
- Radioactive Waste Management Facility
- Secondary Standards Dosimetry Laboratory

=== Atomic Research Division ===
Agricultural Research Section

This division includes the Plant Mutation Breeding Facility, which aims for the improvement of mutation breeding of important crops. Data is gathered to compare mutants with original plants. Procedures are also undertaken for asexual propagation and testing the pre-germination of seeds.

The Plant tissue culture Laboratory aids projects in mutation induction for tissue propagation.

The Soil Science and Plant Nutrition Laboratory is for the research and development of technologies for soil, water, and crop management packages through the use of an isotope tracer and nuclear techniques. The goal is to enhance agricultural productivity while conserving natural resources for sustainable crop production.

Applied Physics Research Section

The PNRI houses the Mössbauer Effect Spectrometry (MES) system, which studies nuclear structure with the absorption and re-emission of gamma rays. The other two systems are the X-ray fluorescence Spectrometry (XRF) and X-ray fluorescence Diffractometry (XRD). The XRF is a non-destructive analytical technique used to determine the composition of materials. On the other hand, the XRD, also an analytical technique, is used for phase identification of a crystalline material and provides information on the unit cell dimensions. It is more widely used for the identification of unknown crystalline materials such as minerals and inorganic compounds.

Biomedical Research Section

For the Cytogenetics Research Laboratory, this facility monitors and calculates the accidental (or occupational) exposure of workers and/or researchers who have been exposed to ionizing radiation through the analyses of blood samples. The Microbiological Service Laboratory performs the bioburden and sterility testing of medical devices.

Chemistry Research Section

The Radiation Crosslinking Laboratory practices covalent bonding with one or more polymers and imparting improved mechanical and functional properties in the result of cross-linking products. Next is the Radiation Degradation Laboratory. This facility analyzes degradation products through gel permeation chromatography and separates different molecular weight fractions by tangential flow filtration. Another facility is the Radiation-Induced Graft Polymerization Laboratory which specializes Graft polymerization as a method for the modification of a material's chemical and physical properties. Electron beam and gamma irradiation are utilized to create active sites for grafting.

For quantitative measurements, the Radioactivity Measurement Laboratory measures low level radioactivity in soil erosion studies and toxicity assay for red tide toxins by using detectors to identify and quantify alpha, beta and gamma spectrometries.

Another is the Radioassay Laboratory, which established the Radiological and Receptor Binding Assay (RBA); a method used for measuring toxicity in red tide. The last laboratory for the Chemistry Research Section is the Radiometric Dating Laboratory. This facility is a sediment dating laboratory used to study both the history of pollution in a certain area and the sedimentation rate and processes in coastal areas, lakes, rivers, and dams.

Health Physics Research Section

Stored in the Environmental Monitoring Laboratory are nuclear instruments used to measure low - level radioactivity collected from different types of environmental samples in various parts of the Philippines. Among the instruments stored here are the Co-Axial High Purity Germanium (HPGe) detector which is a type of semiconductor detector used specifically for gamma spectroscopy as well as x-ray spectroscopy.

In case of emergencies that may lead to an extensive spread of radioactive materials, an On-line Environmental Radiation Monitoring System provides real-time data of the radiation levels nationwide is at work.

Nuclear Materials Research Section

The Nuclear Materials Research Facility uses gamma ray spectrometers to observe particles found in a certain concentration or venue.

=== Nuclear Services Division ===
Irradiation Services Section

The first facility is the Electron Beam Irradiation Facility. Through irradiation caused by Electron Beams, it is used for the sterilization of food and medical devices as well as for refining electrical components such as wires and semiconductors. Electron Beams emit radiation faster than gamma rays. An average gamma ray would take hours to irradiate an object while an electron beam may take only seconds. The next is the Gammacell-220, that is used for irradiating small samples of objects and in regulating dosimeters. The last facility is the Multipurpose Irradiation Facility. It is multi-purpose gamma ray irradiator which may be used for various applications such as elimination of harmful bacteria, improvement of agriculture and sterilization of equipment.

Isotope Techniques Section

The Technetium-99m (Tc-99m) Generator Facility domestically produces Technetium 99m (Tc-99m), a radioisotope necessary for the creation of radiopharmaceuticals. The domestic production of this isotope will allow it to be sold in the Philippines at a cheaper price and with a greater supply.

Nuclear Analytical Techniques Application Section

The Isotope Radio Mass Spectrometry Facility (IRMS) analyzes substances such as water and records the stable isotopes found in the substance. The other facility under this section is the Nuclear Analytical Techniques Laboratory which handles the research and development of topics revolving around nuclear and nuclear-related techniques.

== Services ==
The PNRI offers several services related to nuclear energy for professionals and PNRI employees.

For their Irradiation Services, these are offered for food irradiation, for medical products sterilization and for research purposes.

The PNRI also offers the following Radiation Protection Services:

- Personnel Dosimetry - As part of the radiation protection program of the facility, this is to help ensure that the workers that are exposed to radiation in their workplace are within safety limits.
- Calibration Services - Through the Secondary Standards and Dosimetry Laboratory (SSDL), the PNRI establishes the national standards for ionizing radiation. This is to ensure radiation sources nationwide are standardized and well-maintained and instruments of radiation are correctly calibrated for accuracy.
- Radioactive Waste Management Services - This service is to ensure the correct and proper disposal and/or stage of radioactive wastes that have been used or unused.
- Radiation Control - For workplaces and facilities to comply with the radiation safety standards, leak testing and workplace monitoring services are provided by the PNRI as well.

The Nuclear Analytical Techniques Applications (NATA) Services is for radioactivity measurements and elemental determinations are provided to analyze the usage of nuclear techniques.

The Cytogenetic Analysis for Radiological Reassurance is for the monitoring or calculation of accidental or occupational exposure of clients who are exposed to gamma radiation through blood sampling.

For Microbiological Testing, bioburden and sterility testing of devices of medicine are offered using the ISO 11137.2 to establish a dose of radiation sterilization.

This scanning technique called the Gamma-ray Column Scanning Technique is for Industries is a service is to assist industries through the inspection and investigation utilizing the Gamma Ray Column Scanning Technology.

In the Radiometric / Gamma ray Spectrometry, gamma ray spectrometers are used for geological mapping, radiogenic mineral exploration, hydrothermal alteration detection, radiogenic and chemical element pollution studies, and superficial structural discontinuity detection.

The Nuclear Information Services, disseminates information on nuclear science and technology to the general public.

The Engineering Services of the PNRI offers Instrument Repair Diagnostics, Decommissioning of Cobalt-60 Teletheraphy Machine, and Radioactive Waste Management.

As for the Regulation of Nuclear Transportation, this ensures certified parties follow nuclear transportation regulations as well as issuance of certificates for nuclear transportation both national and domestic.

Through the Nuclear Training Courses (NTC), the PNRI is able to conduct training sources for different agencies, companies, industries, institutions, academe, and public. These include provisions of training courses in the field of nuclear science and technology, radiation safety, and non-destructive testing techniques.

- Radiation Safety Courses
- Technology Diffusion Courses (TDC)
- Special Courses in cooperation with the Japan Atomic Energy Agency (JAEA)

Furthermore, they offer On-the-Job Training Opportunities, students and technologies who would like to use nuclear apparatuses and working with researchers in the PNRI, different divisions offer training opportunities as requested.

Lastly, their Non-Destructive Training (NDT) Courses is the opportunity for practice of different nuclear-related courses. These are generally catered those who are willing to learn an in-depth knowledge on nuclear sciences.

== Research and development projects ==
=== Food and agriculture ===
The PNRI is experimenting on crop production with mutation breeding; wherein plant breeders use various techniques, and mutagens such as radiation or chemicals, to improve the crops' individual yields and develop new varieties of crop. Radiation can induce hereditary changes, or mutations, in irradiated planting materials. Another development is the carrageenan PGP as plant food supplement where the radiation-induced degradation of natural polymers like carrageenan PGP is performed to yield oligosaccharides: natural bioactive agents that act as plant food supplements. Another technique is radiation processing, involving the exposure of materials to ionizing radiation by either gamma radiation or electron beam.

The PNRI also practices "Irradiation for Food Safety and Quality": food irradiation prolongs the shelf-life of certain food and agricultural products, destroys counterproductive bacteria and microorganisms, and can disinfest grains such as rice and corn. The "Precision Farming Methods with Stable Isotope Techniques," are done to improve soil test value and to provide fertilizer recommendations by using analyses based primarily on the N^{15} and C^{13} isotopes and the Soil Moisture Neutron Probe.

The PNRI helps with insect control in the Philippines through regulation or eradication. This was modeled after similar experiments done to pests in Kume Island and the Okinawa Prefecture in Japan. Regulation or eradication is performed by collecting pests, such as fruit flies, and then exposing them to gamma radiation in order to sterilize them. These sterile pests are then released back into nature and help prevent reproduction.

=== Human health and medicine ===
The PNRI developed a polyvinylpyrrolidone carrageenan dressing: a fully permanent gel in a form of a sheet that is 3-4mm thick and containing over 90% water, used to treat burns, wounds, and bedsores. It is made from polyvinylpyrrolidone, a water-soluble polymer, and carrageenan, a seaweed polysaccharide, by means of radiation processing to effect cross-linking and sterilize the product into a final form. Through the process of radiation processing, radiation-sterilized honey alginate wound dressing was also developed for exudating burns and wounds. It is made from local honey and sodium alginate.

=== Environmental protection and management ===
The PNRI utilizes nuclear techniques in addressing problems in air pollution, algal bloom, and water resources management through isotope-based techniques, analytical nuclear techniques, and nuclear-based techniques in algal bloom studies, such as nuclear assay in red tide toxin analysis and lead-210 dating method. The PNRI also took environmental radioactivity measurements following the 2011 Fukushima Daiichi nuclear disaster as part of its radiological surveillance program for public protection and safety. The PNRI aims to assess the environmental impact of the radioactive discharges of the accident and their possible effects on human health through soil, sediment, and seawater analysis for anthropogenic radionuclides—indicators of the nuclear power plant accident.

=== Application of high technology materials ===
In the 1990s, the PNRI identified rare-earth element (REE) deposits in northwestern Palawan through earlier geo-chemical surveys and studies. Considered as strategic minerals, REEs are supportive elements in the production of electronics and in the renewable energy industry. From 2013 to 2016, the PNRI undertook a combined verification stream sediment and radiometric survey to identify and recommend a detailed evaluation of prospective sites. The collected samples were analyzed for REE and thorium using X-ray fluorescence (XRF) and uranium determination using fluorimetry, including atomic absorption spectroscopy for other trace elements of economic value.

== See also ==
- Bataan Nuclear Power Plant
