= Mr. Gay World Philippines =

Non-profit organization

Mr. Gay World Philippines Organization is a non-profit organization that holds a national contest for Filipino delegates for Mr. Gay World. Wilbert Ting Tolentino was given the license to be the newest national director in January 2016. Christian Lacsamana was the first Filipino delegate appointed by Wilbert Ting Tolentino to represent the Philippines in Malta, in April 2016. He was second runner up, the first Filipino to make it that far. In March 01, 2024, Wilbert Tolentino announced that Mr. Wayne Renzo is now the new owner of Mr Gay World Philippines.

Mr Gay World Australia Patrick MacDonald 2016 voluntarily withdrew from the competition. Bookmakers placed MacDonald (Surfers Paradise) as the frontrunner with odds of 1.50 and Lacsamana (Philippines) at 2.70. When Australia withdrew, Lacsamana's odds globally averaged 1.55, making him the pre-arrival frontrunner according to bookmakers following MacDonald's withdrawal.

Its aim is to eradicate stereotypes, to combat sexual prejudice, and to continue the efforts for HIV/AIDS Early Detection Program and erase the stigma of testing and the disease.

== Logo ==
The logo is a depiction of the National Costume worn by Wilbert Ting Tolentino, the first candidate, who won best in national costume in Whistler, Canada in 2009. The design is an archangel with wings spread apart, holding a sword that symbolizes the continuous struggle for its advocacy and purpose.

== Before Tolentino ==
Noemi Alberto was the national director of Mr. Gay World Philippines Inc. from 2007 until 2015. Alberto appointed Wilbert Ting Tolentino, Mr. Gay Philippines 2007 2nd runner up, to represent the Philippines for Mr. Gay World 2009 in Whistler, Canada. Tolentino bagged numerous special wards. Since 2009, the Philippine delegate got eight Best in National Costumes and four Mr. Gay Popularity awards.

== Titleholders ==
- Declared as the winner
- Ended as a runner-up
- Ended as a semifinalist
- Received an award but was unplaced

Year	Candidate	International Placement	Special Awards
2026	Drei Arias	TBA	TBA
2025	Miguel Germina	Top 7	Best in National Costume
2024	John Bench Ortiz	1st Runner-Up	Best in National Costume
2023	John Dela Serna	Unplaced	Best in Swimwear
2022	Jhapett Raymundo	Unplaced	Best in Formal Wear
2021	Joel Rey Carcasona	Mr. Gay World 2021	Social Media Presence
2020	Leonard Kodie Macayan	Mr. Gay World 2020	Best in National Costume
2019	John Jeffrey Carlos	Mr. Gay World 2019	Best in National Costume
2018	Gleeko Magpoc	Unplaced	
2017	John Raspado	Mr. Gay World 2017	Mr. Social Media; Best in Swimwear; Best in Formal Wear; Mr. Online Vote; Mr. Closed Door Interview
2016	Christian Lacsamana	2nd Runner-Up	Best in National Costume
2015	Nomer Yuzon	Unplaced	
2014	Randolph Val Palma	Top 10	
2013	Erimar Ortigas	Top 10	Mr. Gay Popularity
2012	Carlito Rosadino Jr.	Unplaced	Best in National Costume; Mr. Gay Popularity
2011	Marc Earnest Biala	Top 10	Best in National Costume; Mr. Gay Popularity
2010	David Bosley	Top 10	
2009	Wilbert Tolentino	Unplaced	Best in National Costume; Mr. Gay Popularity; Best in Formal Wear; Sports Challenge Winner
