= Mr. Gay World Philippines 2017 =

Mr. Gay World Philippines 2017 (MGWP) is the official national pageant for Mr. Gay World 2017. It is organized by Mr. Gay World Philippines Organization founded by Wilbert Ting Tolentino, Mr. Gay World-Philippines national director, Mr. Gay World Philippines 2009 and Philippines' first representative to the Mr. Gay World 2009 in Canada.

Baguio's John Fernandez Raspado will be representing the Philippines in 2017's Mr. Gay World competition. Raspado was named Mr. Gay World Philippines 2016 at the University of the Philippines Theater in Quezon City.

Zamboanga del Sur's Khalil Vera Cruz was named second runner-up, while Pangasinan's John Bench Ortiz was named first runner-up. Raspado also won other special awards, including Best in National Costume, Best in Casual Wear, and Mr. Gay World Philippines Popularity. Back in May 2014, Raspado won the title of the first-ever "I Am PoGay."

== Regional candidates ==
| Region | Name | Representation | Age | Hometown | Placement | Awards |
| LUZON | | | | | | |
|---|---|---|---|---|---|---|
| Ilocos | Erick Jay Dario | Ilocos Sur | 29 | Candon | none | |
| | John Bench T. Ortiz | Pangasinan | 24 | Tayug | 1st Runner Up | Best in Swimwear Best in Casual Wear |
| Cagayan Valley | Kyle Go Tecson | Cagayan | 24 | Tuguegarao | none | |
| Cordillera Administrative Region | John Fernandez Raspado | Baguio | 35 | Baguio | Grand Winner | Mr. Photogenic Best in Talent Best in National Costume Mr. Popularity |
| Central Luzon | Plaveo Pineda | Pampanga | 27 | Angeles City | none | |
| | Mark Lopez | Bataan | 25 | Dinalupihan | withdrew | |
| | Rolando Asban David Jr. | Pampanga | 27 | San Fernando, Pampanga | none | Mr. Congeniality |
| National Capital Region | Ronald Lamson | Lawang Bato Valenzuela | 25 | Lawang Bato, Valenzuela | Top 15 | |
| | Mark Errol Casilihan | Mandaluyong | 29 | Mandaluyong | none | |
| | Gian Henderson "Preetiboi Bottom" Liangco Ilustre | Manila | 22 | Manila | none | |
| | Erwin Javier Ostos | North Bay Navotas | 34 | North Bay, Navotas | none | |
| | Frankie Chiu | San Juan | 25 | San Juan | Top 15 | |
| | Jessie G. Quitevis | Taguig | 30 | Taguig | Top 15 | |
| | Mark Anthony Bacongan | Tanza Navotas | 24 | Tanza, Navotas | none | |
| | Godofredo Pascual Dela Cruz Jr. | Valenzuela | 29 | Valenzuela | Top 10 | |
| Calabarzon | Leo Ponce | Batangas | 32 | Nasugbu | Top 5 | |
| | John Jeffrey Carlos | Cavite | 38 | General Trias | Top 5 | Social Media Award The City Spa Award |
| | Greg Obcena | Laguna | 26 | Sta. Rosa | none | |
| | Jerome Lacsa | Rizal | 30 | Antipolo | Top 15 | |
| Mimaropa | Ronaldo Ramos | Palawan | 24 | Roxas | none | |
| Bicol | Paulo Ferrer | Sorsogon | 30 | Gubat | none | |
| VISAYAS | | | | | | |
| Western Visayas | Joemar Narciso | Roxas, Capiz | 26 | Roxas, Capiz | none | |
| Negros Island | Roland Teves JR. | Bacolod | 26 | Bacolod | none | |
| | Madrid Villagonzalo Layan | Dumaguete | 26 | Dumaguete | none | |
| Central Visayas | Jesse Regin S. Nacilla | Cebu | 27 | Cebu City | Top 10 | |
| Eastern Visayas | Jaybee A. Cana | Tacloban | 29 | Tacloban | none | |
| Mindanao | | | | | | |
| Zamboanga Peninsula | Christian Khalil Gorospe Vera Cruz | Zamboanga del Sur | 33 | Pagadian | 2nd Runner Up | Best in Formal Wear |
| Northern Mindanao | Ian Roy Jamison Paderanga | Misamis Occidental | 30 | Aloran | Top 15 | |
| Caraga | Richard Horris Fama Castones | Agusan del Sur | 27 | Rosario | none | |
| | Ronald P. Ata | Surigao del Norte | 36 | Gigaquit | withdrew | |
| | Saveno Santillan | Surigao del Sur | 29 | Barobo | none | |
| Davao | Jerome Mantilla | Davao City | 28 | Matina, Davao City | none | |
| | Jose Jade Dafielmoto Ingay | Davao del Sur | 26 | Davao City | none | |
| Soccsksargen | Peter Leary Brown | General Santos | 25 | General Santos | Top 10 | |
| | Raffy Gavina | Sultan Kudarat | 25 | Tacurong | Top 10 | |
| Autonomous Region in Muslim Mindanao | Omar Naga | Lanao del Sur | 30 | Marawi | none | |

== Preliminary competition ==
=== Pre-pageant night ===
The Pre-pageant night was held on September 17, 2016, at Trinity University of Asia in Quezon City. It constitutes three major competitions: Casual Wear, Swimwear and Formal Wear. Hence, Mr. Pangasinan bagged the first two special awards and Mr. Zamboanga del Sur got the Best in Formal Wear.

=== Closed-Door Interview ===
45% of the overall criteria falls to this category wherein candidates were asked random questions from a different set of judges.

=== National Costume ===
Each candidate was asked to wear their own costume that has captured the essence and style of the native provinces and cities they represented. The winner for this category may used for 2017's Mr. Gay World as an official national costume for the country.

== Talent Competition ==
This is a non-criteria round. Mr. Baguio was award the highest due to its fusion of traditional Igurot dance with modern music. Mr. Rizal got second place.

== The Finale ==
All the scores from the Preliminary Competition were accumulated to define the Top 13. Score from its Talent round is not considered.

== Fast Track ==
Two important special awards will be considered to advance to the semi-finals: Social Media award and Mr. Popularity. Both were given to Cavite's John Jeffrey Carlos and Baguio's John Fernandez Raspado.

== The Result ==
| Placement | Name | Representation | Special Awards |
|---|---|---|---|
| Winner | John Fernandez Raspado | Mr. Baguio | Mr. Photogenic Best in Talent Best in National Costume Mr. Popularity |
| 1st Runner Up | John Bench T. Ortiz | Mr. Pangasinan | Best in Swimwear Best in Casual Wear |
| 2nd Runner Up | Christian Khalil Gorospe Vera Cruz | Mr. Zamboanga del Sur | Best in Formal Wear |
| Top 5 | John Jeffrey Carlos | Mr. Cavite | Social Media Award The City Spa Award |
| Top 5 | Leo Ponce | Mr. Batangas | |
| Top 10 | Ronaldo Ramos | Mr. Palawan | |
| Top 10 | Peter Leary Brown | Mr. General Santos | |
| Top 10 | Jesse Regin S. Nacilla | Mr. Cebu | |
| Top 10 | Raffy Gavina | Mr. Sultan Kudarat | |
| Top 10 | Godofredo Pascual Dela Cruz Jr. | Mr. Valenzuela | |
| Top 15 | Jerome Lacsa | Mr. Rizal | |
| Top 15 | Frankie Chiu | Mr. San Juan | |
| Top 15 | Ian Roy Jamison Paderanga | Mr. Misamis Occidental | |
| Top 15 | Jessie G. Quitevis | Mr. Taguig | |
| Top 15 | Ronald Lamson | Mr. Lawang Bato Valenzuela | |

== Controversies ==
=== Local fashion designers ===
Renowned local fashion designers participated in the event as they created various collection of festive costumes and formal wear.

=== Withdrawal ===
Mr. Bataan and Mr. Surigao del Norte withdrew prior the pre-pageant night due to working constraints by their employers.

=== Gay police candidate ===
Taguig's Police Officer 1 Jessie G. Quitevis was a media spotlight prior to the finale due to his profession. He was featured in several major radio and TV guesting.

=== Muslim group ===
Muslim groups in the province of Lanao del Sur were outraged with the participation of Omar Naga, a Muslim descent candidate who came from a Maranao tribe in Marawi.

=== Military family ===
Three of the candidates came from military backgrounds: Angeles's Plaveo Pineda, Misamis Occidental's Ian Roy Jamison Paderanga and Davao City's Jerome Mantilla.

=== By regions ===
Candidates by Geography
| Mr. Gay World Philippines 2017 is located in Philippines | Luzon | NCR | Visayas | Mindanao |
| Mr. Gay World Philippines 2017 is located in Philippines | Angeles; Baguio; Bataan; Batangas; Cagayan; Cavite; Ilocos Sur; Laguna; Palawan; Pangasinan; Rizal; San Fernando, Pampanga; Sorsogon | Lawang Bato Valenzuela: Mandaluyong; Manila; North Bay Navotas; San Juan Taguig: Tanza Navotas; Valenzuela | Bacolod; Cebu; Dumaguete; Roxas, Capiz; Tacloban | Agusan del Sur; Davao City; Davao del Sur; General Santos; Misamis Occidental; Sultan Kudarat; Surigao del Norte; Surigao del Sur; Zamboanga del Sur; Lanao del Sur |
Map Legend: Withdrew; Non Winners; Top 15; Top 10; Top 5; Top 3; Winner
