= Mr Gay =

Mr Gay may refer to:

== Events ==
- International Mr Gay Competition
- Mr Gay Europe
- Mr Gay World

country specific

- Mister Gay Chile
- Mr Gay India
- Mr Gay Ireland
- Mr Gay South Africa
- Mr Gay Sweden
- Mr Gay Wales
- Mr Gay UK

== Others ==
- Mr. Gay Canada, a Canadian English language documentary television series on OUTtv

== See also ==
- Miss Gay (disambiguation)
