= Mr Gay World 2013 =

- Date: August 4, 2013
- Presenters: Amaryllis Temmerman; Brigitte Derks; René Vanhove
- Venue: Elckerlijc Theatre, Antwerp, Belgium
- Broadcaster: Mr Gay World Official Site
- Entrants: 25
- Placements: 10
- Debuts: Aruba; Denmark; Myanmar; Puerto Rico; Taiwan; Ukraine
- Withdrawals: Bulgaria; Ireland; Italy; Netherlands; Pakistan; Venezuela
- Returns: Austria; Belgium; India; Northern Ireland
- Winner: Christopher Michael Olwage; New Zealand
- Congeniality: Danny Dionysios Papadatos; Canada
- Best National Costume: Christopher Michael Olwage; New Zealand
- Photogenic: Jaime David Montes Bernal; Mexico

Mr Gay World 2013, the 5th Mr Gay World competition, was held over 5 days in Antwerp, Belgium during the worldOutgames 2013, with the Grand Finale at Elckerlijc Theatre, Antwerp, Belgium on August 4, 2013. Andreas Derleth of New Zealand crowned his successor Christopher Michael Olwage, also of New Zealand, at the end of this event. 25 countries and territories competed for the title.

== Results ==
Final results	Contestant
Mr Gay World 2013	New Zealand – Christopher Michael Olwage
1st Runner-Up	Hong Kong – Benjie Vasquez Caraig
2nd Runner-Up	United States – Matthew "Matt" Simmons
Top 5	Aruba – Ashley Peternella; Namibia – Ricardo Raymond Amunjera
Top 10	Australia – Aaron Taylor; India – Nolan Lewis; Mexico – Jaime David Montes Bernal; Philippines – Erimar Sayo Ortigas; Taiwan – Darien Chen

=== Special awards ===
Award	Contestant
Mr. Gay Congeniality	Canada – Danny Dionysios Papadatos
Mr. Gay Photogenic	Mexico – Jaime David Montes Bernal
Best National Costume	New Zealand – Christopher Michael Olwage
Popular Vote	Philippines – Erimar Sayo Ortigas
Sports Challenge	Aruba – Ashley Peternella
Mr. Gay Swimwear	New Zealand – Christopher Michael Olwage
Art Challenge Award	New Zealand – Christopher Michael Olwage

== Judges ==
- Eric Butter - President of Mr Gay World (Australia);
- Andy Derleth - Mr Gay World 2012 (New Zealand);
- Adebisi Alimi - Public speaker and a Sessional University Lecturer (Nigeria);
- Beverly Vergel - Training Specialist, Image Consultant (Philippines);
- Kristof De Busser - Chief Inspector and Member of the Diversity Team of the Antwerp Local Police (Belgium);
- Michiel Vanackere - Field coordinator for a European HIV prevalence research project at the Institute for Tropical Health in Antwerp (Belgium);
- Morris Chapdelaine - Film producer and media specialist (Canada).

== Contestants ==
Country	Contestant	Age	Height
Aruba	Ashley Peternella	21	1.88 m (6 ft 2 in)
Australia	Aaron Taylor	26	1.83 m (6 ft 0 in)
Austria	Joachim Trauner	30	1.81 m (5 ft 11 1/2 in)
Belgium	Tom Goris	34	1.83 m (6 ft 0 in)
Brazil	Marcio Evandro Maia	33	1.80 m (5 ft 11 in)
Canada	Danny Dionysios Papadatos	28	1.78 m (5 ft 10 in)
Chile	Jean Daniel Muñoz	25	1.80 m (5 ft 11 in)
Czech Republic	Marek Zly	34	1.80 m (5 ft 11 in)
Denmark	Michael Sinan	35	1.81 m (5 ft 11 1/2 in)
Finland	Janne Tiilikainen	27	1.75 m (5 ft 9 in)
France	Armando Santos	26	1.76 m (5 ft 9 1/2 in)
Hong Kong	Benjie Vasquez Caraig	31	1.76 m (5 ft 9 1/2 in)
India	Nolan Lewis	29	1.78 m (5 ft 10 in)
Mexico	Jaime David Montes Bernal	25	1.76 m (5 ft 9 1/2 in)
Myanmar	Sai Pye Myo Kyaw	28	1.80 m (5 ft 11 in)
Namibia	Ricardo Raymond Amunjera	30	1.81 m (5 ft 11 1/2 in)
New Zealand	Christopher Michael Olwage	27	1.78 m (5 ft 10 in)
Northern Ireland	Conor O’Kane	20	1.73 m (5 ft 8 in)
Philippines	Erimar Sayo Ortigas	29	1.77 m (5 ft 9 1/2 in)
Puerto Rico	Juan Luis Ortiz	30	1.89 m (6 ft 2 1/2 in)
South Africa	Steve Williams	38	1.80 m (5 ft 11 in)
Spain	Miguel Ortiz	20	1.83 m (6 ft 0 in)
Switzerland	Luis Bonfiglio	25	1.75 m (5 ft 9 in)
Taiwan	Darien Chen	30	1.84 m (6 ft 1/2 in)
USA	Matthew Simmons	25	1.68 m (5 ft 6 in)

== National pageant notes ==
=== Debuts ===
- Aruba
- Denmark
- Myanmar
- Puerto Rico
- Taiwan

=== Returning countries ===
- Last competed in 2009:
  - Austria
- Last competed in 2010:
  - Belgium
- Last competed in 2011:
  - India
  - Northern Ireland
