= Mr Gay World South Africa =

Competition

- Formation: 2009
- Type: Beauty Pageant
- Headquarters: South Africa
- Members: 21+
- Official language: English
- Website: mrgwsa.com

Mr Gay World South Africa (previously known as Mr Gay South Africa) is a beauty pageant competition for gay men in South Africa, founded in 2009.

== History ==
Mr Gay South Africa was established in 2009. Both the 2009 and 2010 winners, Charl van den Berg and Francois Nel, went on to win the Mr Gay World title; van den Berg in Oslo, and Nel in Manila. The 2011 Mr Gay South Africa, Lance Weyer, an elected public representative in East London, Eastern Cape, was first runner-up when Mr Gay World was hosted in Johannesburg in April 2012.

Jason Rogers was selected as Mr Gay South Africa 2012 at a Grand Finale at the Atterbury Theatre, Pretoria on 8 December 2012, and would have represented South Africa at Mr Gay World 2013 in Antwerp, but later resigned, citing work and study commitments preventing him from giving his full commitment to the title. The first runner-up, Steve Williams, took over the 2012 title and competed in Antwerp, Belgium. The 2013 title holder is Werner de Waal, representing South Africa at Mr. Gay World 2014 in Rome, Italy. The competition is defined by the organisation as the search for the ultimate gay male in South Africa. Mr Gay South Africa is a heavily promoted role in the country and the title holder takes his job of educating, informing and campaigning to the public at large seriously. The winner represents South Africa at the annual Mr Gay World competition.

== Titleholders ==
Year	Country/Territory	Mr Gay World	National title	Location
2009	South Africa	Charl Van Den Berg	Mr Gay South Africa	Johannesburg, South Africa
2010	South Africa	Francois Nel	Mr Gay South Africa	Johannesburg, South Africa
2011	South Africa	Lance Weyer	Mr Gay South Africa	Johannesburg, South Africa
2012	South Africa	Jason Rogers and Steve Williams	Mr Gay South Africa	Pretoria, South Africa
2013–2014	South Africa	Werner De Waal	Mr Gay South Africa	Cape Town, South Africa
2015	South Africa	Craig Maggs	Mr Gay South Africa	Johannesburg, South Africa
2016	South Africa	Oelof de Meyer	Mr Gay Mardi Gras Southern Africa	Knysna, South Africa
2016	South Africa	Alexander Steyn	Mr Gay Mardi Gras Southern Africa / Mr Gay World Southern Africa	Knysna, South Africa
2017	South Africa	Juan Pinnick	Mr Gay World South Africa	Pretoria, South Africa
2018	South Africa	Chris Emmanual	Mr Gay World South Africa	Pretoria, South Africa
2019-2020	South Africa	Charl-jaquairdo van Helsdingen	Mr Gay World South Africa	Pretoria, South Africa
2021	South Africa	Shanon Kannigan	Mr Gay World South Africa	Johannesburg, South Africa
