= Timeline of LGBTQ history in Namibia =

This article is a timeline of notable events affecting the lesbian, gay, bisexual, transgender, and queer (LGBTQ) community in Namibia.

== 1900s ==
=== 1920 ===
- The territory that comprises Namibia is annexed by South Africa, and therefore Roman-Dutch law is now applied in the area. This body of law introduces the prohibition of sodomy, defined as "intentional sexual penetration per anum between men".

=== 1990 ===
- Namibia officially gains independence from South Africa and inherits their law against male homosexuality through the prohibition of buggery. There are no known reports that this law was ever applied to prosecute LGBTQ+ people who have had consensual sex. However, the law perpetuated stigmas against LGBTQ people and limited their inclusion in government health plans.

=== 1995 ===
- The Gay and Lesbian Social Committee forms the Gay and Lesbian Organization of Namibia (GLON) as an LGBTQ rights advocacy group. However, GLON was criticized for being perceived as a white organization and would subsequently be dissolved.

=== 1996 ===
- The Rainbow Project of Namibia is formed to respond to homophobic comments from the Southwest Africa People's Organization.

== 2000s ==
=== 2000 ===
- In a speech, Interior Minister Jerry Ekandjo calls on police to "eliminate" LGBTQ+ people. In response to criticism for his comment, Ekandjo would later state that by "eliminate," he meant to ignore or sideline them.

=== 2001 ===
- March 6: The Supreme Court of Namibia rules against the legal recognition of a same-sex couple consisting of activist Elizabeth Khaxas and German citizen Liz Frank. The couple had argued that the government had violated the right to equality guaranteed in Article 10 of the Namibian Constitution due to their sexual orientation when submitting an application for residency for Frank. The court stated in its ruling that Article 10 did not include sexual orientation as a protected category against discrimination.
- April 6: President Sam Nujoma publicly says all gay foreigners will be deported from Namibia upon arrival at the airport, following news of the first same-sex marriages performed in the Netherlands.

=== 2004 ===
- Women from 14 countries meet in Windhoek to form the African Lesbian Coalition.

=== 2011 ===
- November 26: The first edition of Mister Gay Namibia takes place, making Namibia the second country in Africa to hold a pageant of this type, after South Africa. The winner of the event was activist Wendelinus Hamutenya.

=== 2013 ===
- December 7: The first pride march takes place in Windhoek, taking place in the Katutura area and attracting around 100 people. It is the first known pride march in the country, although a similar event was planned in Keetmanshoop in 2009.

=== 2016 ===
- June 4: The first pride march in Swakopmund takes place. It gathered around 150 attendees.
- August 17: The Office of the United Nations High Commissioner for Human Rights presents a report in Windhoek, calling on the Namibian government to decriminalize homosexuality. Following the report, the government announced that it had no intention of doing so.

=== 2017 ===
- The Women’s Leadership Centre holds the country’s first lesbian festival. The event took place in Windhoek and brought together more than 60 women.

=== 2018 ===
- May 17: Out-Right Namibia opens the country's first medical center focused on LGBTQ+ healthcare in Windhoek.

=== 2020 ===
- The film Kapana becomes the first Namibian film to primarily focus on a same-sex relationship.

=== 2021 ===
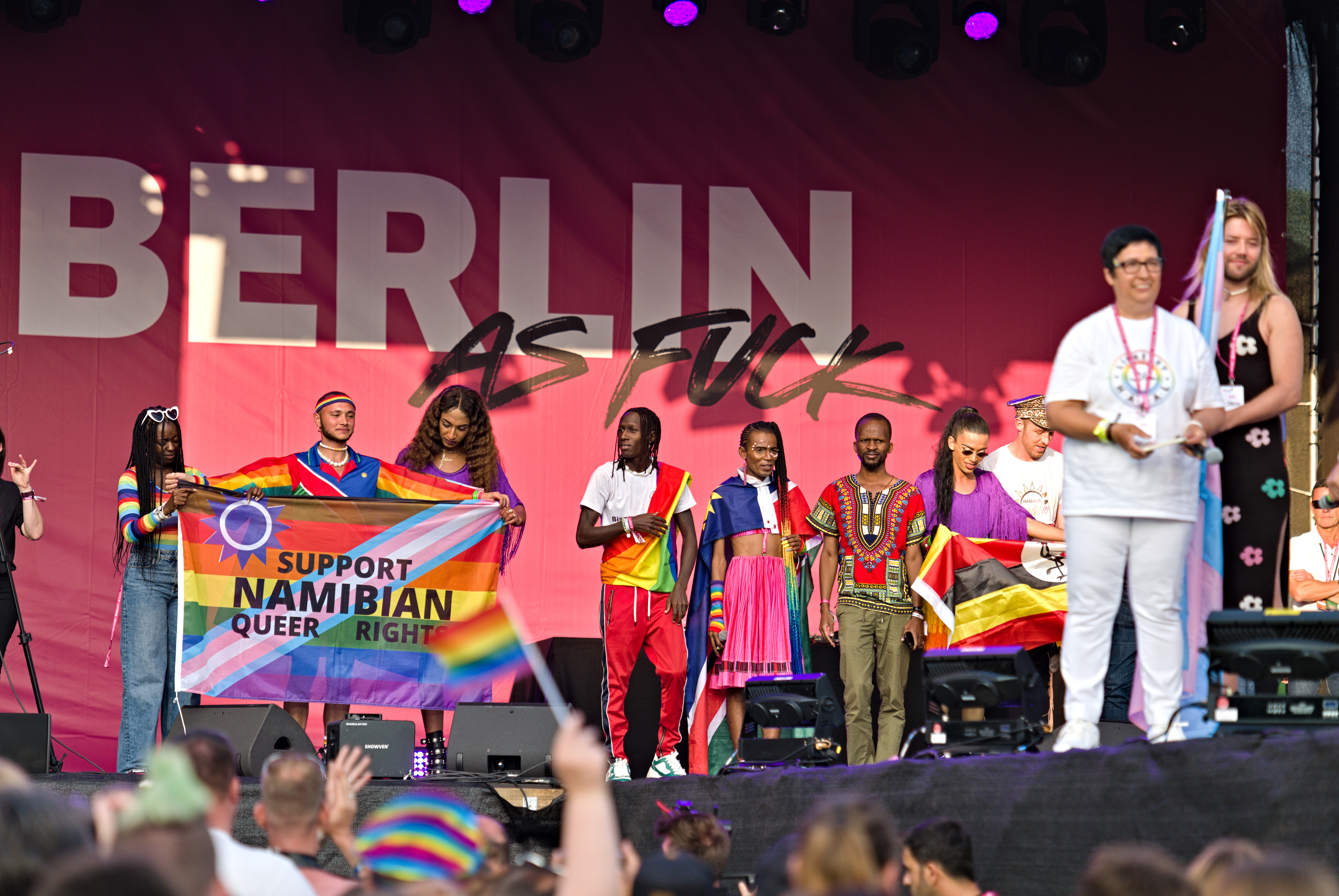
Namibian LGBTQ+ activists at an event during Christopher Street Day in Berlin in 2023.

- The Windhoek High Court issues a ruling granting Namibian citizenship to a child born to a same-sex couple consisting of a Mexican man and a Namibian man. The ruling also stated that discrimination based on sexual orientation was prohibited by the Namibian constitution. However, the Supreme Court overturned the decision in March 2023 on a technicality, stating that the couple had not registered their child within the time stipulated by the relevant law.
- December 5: As part of Namibia Pride celebrations, LGBTQ+ activists paint a pedestrian crossing in the colors of the pride flag outside Brewers Market in Windhoek, becoming the country's first LGBTQ monument.

=== 2023 ===
- May 16: The Supreme Court of Namibia issues a ruling by a vote of 4 to 1 legalizing the recognition of same-sex marriages performed in foreign countries, provided that one of the spouses is Namibian.

=== 2024 ===
- June 21: The Windhoek High Court issues a ruling declaring that the law criminalizing sodomy and "unnatural sexual offenses" between men in the country was unconstitutional, thereby decriminalizing homosexuality in Namibia.
- October 2: President Nangolo Mbumba signs a law against same-sex marriage, stating that same-sex marriages cannot be recognized in Namibia, regardless of where they are performed. This is in response to the 2023 Supreme Court ruling requiring the government to recognize same-sex marriages performed abroad. The law went into effect on December 30.
- November 27: The 2024 general election takes place, with William Minnie and Kevin Wessels running as candidates for the National Assembly, becoming the first openly LGBTQ candidates in an election in the country's history.

== See also ==
- LGBTQ rights in Namibia

== Bibliographies ==
- Currier, Ashley (2012). Out in Africa: LGBT Organizing in Namibia and South Africa. University of Minnesota Press. ISBN 978-0-8166-7800-6. JSTOR 10.5749/j.cttttdkw.
