= Mr Gay World 2011 =

- Date: March 13, 2011
- Presenters: Boy Abunda; Precious Lara Quigaman; Wilma Doesnt
- Venue: Club MWAH, Mandaluyong, Philippines
- Broadcaster: World Wide Mr Gay Official Site
- Entrants: 26
- Placements: 10
- Debuts: Curaçao; Czech Republic; Estonia; Finland; India; Macau; Malaysia; Netherlands; Peru
- Withdrawals: Belgium; China; Italy; Poland; Russia; Switzerland
- Returns: Bulgaria
- Winner: François Nel; South Africa
- Congeniality: Madis Raastas; Estonia
- Best National Costume: Marc Ernest Biala; Philippines
- Photogenic: Aaron Comis; New Zealand

Mr Gay World 2011, the 3rd Mr Gay World pageant, was held at the Club MWAH, in Mandaluyong, Philippines on March 13, 2011. Charl Van Den Berg of South Africa crowned his successor, fellow South African, François Nel. 26 countries and territories were competed for the title.

== Results ==
Final results	Contestant
Mister Gay World 2011	South Africa – François Nel
1st Runner-Up	United States – Michael Kevin Holtz
2nd Runner-Up	Spain – Israel Acevedo
3rd Runner-Up	Australia – Leigh Charles
4th Runner-Up	New Zealand – Aaron Comis
Top 10	Mexico – Juan Manuel Lopez L.; Ireland – Barry Gouldsbury; Philippines – Marc Ernest Biala; Curacao – Rupert Arrindell; Netherlands – Mischa Germeraad

=== Special awards ===
Award	Contestant
Mr. Gay Swimwear	Australia – Leigh Charles
Mr. Gay Formal Wear	Australia – Leigh Charles
Mr. Gay Photogenic	New Zealand – Aaron Comis
Best National Costume	Philippines – Marc Ernest Biala
Mr. Gay Congeniality	Estonia – Madis Raastas
Mr. Community Challenge	Ireland – Barry Gouldsbury
Mr. Popularity Online Voting Awardee	Philippines – Marc Ernest Biala

== Judges ==
- Karen Loren Agustin - Binibining Pilipinas - Universe 2002
- Eric Butter - President of Mr. Gay World Ltd.
- Andrew Craig - Founding Editor DNA Magazine.
- Gloria Diaz - Miss Universe 1969
- Jorgen Landby - Freelance Make Up Artist
- Remco Teppema - Co-founder/co-publisher of the gay publications Winq and Mate Magazine
- Charl Van Den Berg - Mr Gay World 2010.

== Contestants ==
Country	Contestant	Age	Height
Australia	Leigh Charles	26	1.79 m (5 ft 10 1/2 in)
Brazil	Eduardo Kamke	29	1.80 m (5 ft 11 in)
Bulgaria	Stanislav Tanchevv	36	1.79 m (5 ft 10 1/2 in)
Canada	Rob Goddard	21	1.73 m (5 ft 8 in)
Curaçao	Rupert Arrindell	27	1.80 m (5 ft 11 in)
Czech Republic	Martin Goga	26	1.83 m (6 ft 0 in)
Estonia	Madis Räästas	30	1.78 m (5 ft 10 in)
Finland	Kenneth Liukkonen	28	1.73 m (5 ft 8 in)
Hong Kong	Hei Hei Yau	26	1.70 m (5 ft 7 in)
Iceland	Vilhjálmur Davíðsson	23	1.90 m (6 ft 3 in)
India	Raul Patil	23	1.78 m (5 ft 10 in)
Ireland	Barry Gouldsbury	28	1.85 m (6 ft 1 in)
Macau	Jonathan Chong	29	1.85 m (6 ft 1 in)
Malaysia	Bern Lim	35	1.73 m (5 ft 8 in)
Mexico	Juan Manuel Lopez L.	32	1.78 m (5 ft 10 in)
Netherlands	Mischa Germeraad	34	1.82 m (5 ft 11 1/2 in)
New Zealand	Aaron Comis	32	1.79 m (5 ft 10 1/2 in)
Northern Ireland	Chris Flanagan	27	1.75 m (5 ft 9 in)
Norway	Trond Venseth	24	1.83 m (6 ft 0 in)
Peru	Lorenzo Rojas	41	1.75 m (5 ft 9 in)
Philippines	Marc Ernest Biala	24	1.72 m (5 ft 7 1/2 in)
South Africa	Francois Nel	28	1.79 m (5 ft 10 1/2 in)
Spain	Israel Acevedo	31	1.80 m (5 ft 11 in)
Thailand	Kampa Somsrikaew	27	1.72 m (5 ft 7 1/2 in)
United States	Michael Kevin Holtz	26	1.85 m (6 ft 1 in)

== National pageant notes ==
=== Returning country ===
- Last competed in 2009:
  - Bulgaria

=== Withdrawals ===
- Argentina
- Belgium
- Chile
- China
- Italy
- Poland
- Russia
- Switzerland

=== Did not attend ===
- Lesotho
