= Derleth =

Derleth is a German surname. Notable people with this surname include:

- Andreas Derleth, German-New Zealand winner of Mr Gay New Zealand
- August Derleth (1909–1971), American writer and anthologist
- Ludwig Derleth (1870–1948), German writer
- Robert Derleth (1922–2012), American footballer
