= Lei Ponce =

Leo Andrew Comeso Ponce is a Filipino professional make-up artist. Hs is the former Mr. Fahrenheit 2016. He was crowned June 18, 2016 in a gay club in Quezon City. He bagged Best in Casual Wear.

Ponce competed for Mr. Gay World Philippines 2016 in UP Theater and landed him fifth place.

== Early life ==
He was born July 29, 1984, in Mandaluyong, and is a native of Nasugbu, Batangas.

Awards and achievements
Preceded by Christian Lacsamana	Mr. Fahrenheit; Lei Ponce; 2016	Succeeded by TBA
