= John Raspado =

Filipino businessman and pageant titleholder

- Born: John Fernandez Raspado; February 20, 1981 (age 45); Baguio City, Philippines
- Occupations: Businessman; pageant titleholder
- Beauty pageant titleholder
- Title: Mr. Gay World Philippines 2016; Mr Gay World 2017
- Major competitions: Mr. Gay World Philippines 2016 (Winner); Mr Gay World 2017 (Winner)

John Fernandez Raspado (born February 20, 1981, in Baguio City) is a Filipino businessman and pageant titleholder who was crowned Mr. Gay World 2017. He won Mr. Gay World Philippines 2016, therefore earned the right to represent the country in Mr. Gay World. He was the first Filipino and Southeast Asian man to win the title as Mr. Gay World.

Before his pageant stint, he was the grand champion of ABS-CBN's It's Showtime: I Am PoGay contest. His personal life story was also featured in a Lenten television special to the same network.

Awards and achievements
Preceded by Christian Lacsamana	Mr. Gay World Philippines; John Raspado; 2017	Succeeded by TBA
