= Pablo Salvador =

Chilean gay activist and blogger

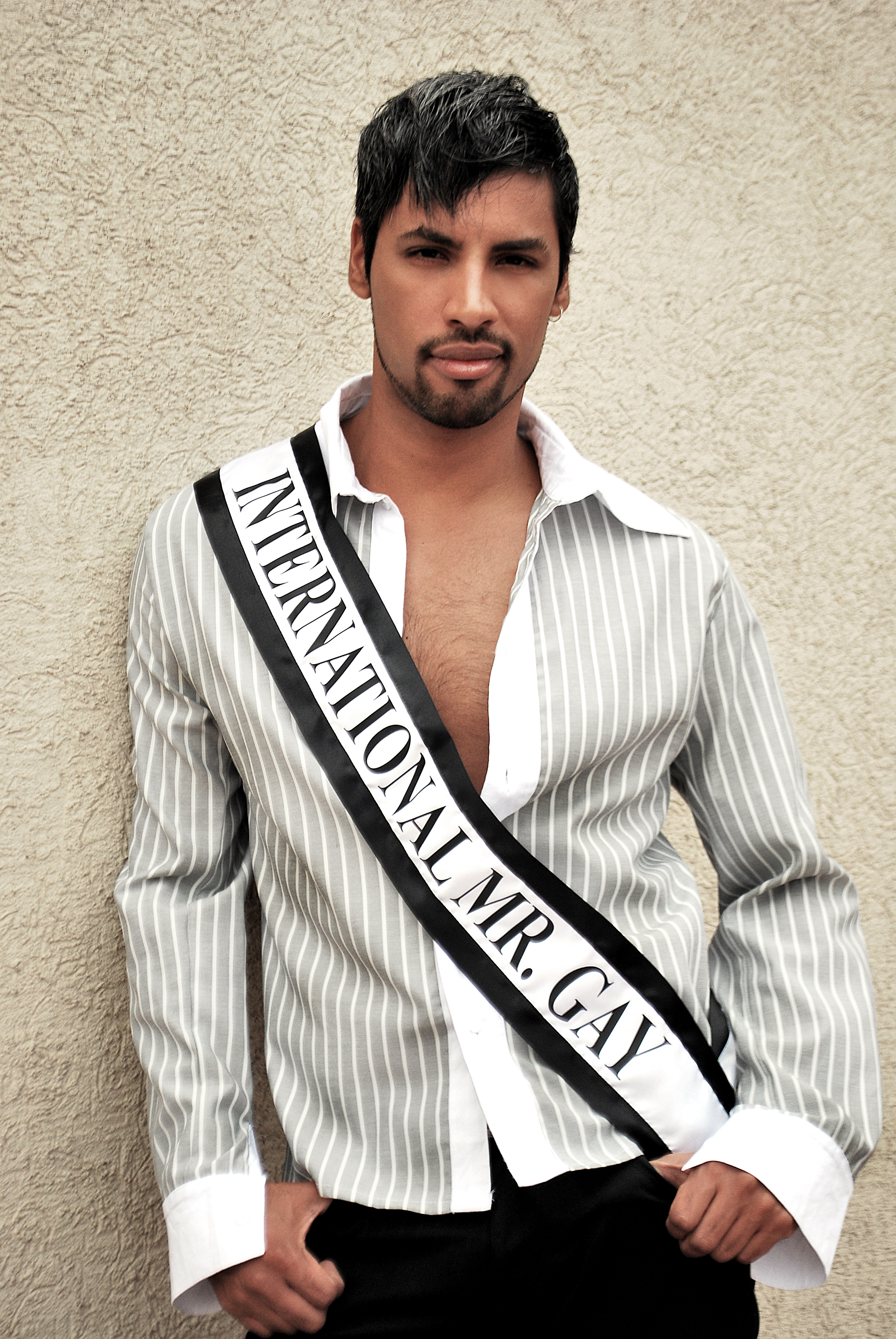
Pablo Salvador International Mr. Gay Titleholder.

Pablo Salvador is a Chilean gay icon born in Panama as Salvador Sepúlveda Montoya. Salvador is Master in Direction of Communication of Pompeu Fabra University, Barcelona, Spain and Professor of History and Management. The greatest success of Chile in a gay contest was in February 2011 when Salvador, Mr. Gay Chile 2009 - 2010, won the International Mr Gay Competition.

== The Activist ==
As an activist, Salvador volunteered in various LGBTI organizations of Chile. Salvador was Spokesman of Education Commission of Fundación Iguales, the Coach and Spokesman for the Organization Mister Gay Chile The New Age, and Spokesman of Daniel Zamudio Foundation. Currently, Salvador is an independent LGBTI activist cause. He won the Outstanding Gay award at the Gloss Magazine 2011 award ceremony and won the Activist of the Year award, at the "Chile Igualdad para todos" 2015 award ceremony.

== The titleholder ==
At the second edition of Mister Gay Chile competition, Salvador returns to compete for the title and won, in December 2009. In February 2010, Salvador represents Chile in the second edition of the Mr Gay World completion in Oslo, Norway The performance of Salvador was praised by the press and by the judges, especially in the personal interview by Editor in Chief of DNA magazine Returning to Chile, Salvador dedicated his period as Mister Gay Chile to support social causes as the fight against bullying and homophobia, with appearances in the press and gay community activities. In January 2011, Salvador competed in the Mr. Gay International and won the title. As International Mr. Gay, Pablo Salvador works for the LGBTQ+ community supporting the first Chilean campaign against bullying at schools. The Educating in Diversity campaign was realized by Movilh and the Teachers Union (Colegio de Profesores). Pablo appeared on Radio and Television Stations in Chile as activist and spokesman.

== Director of Mr. Gay ==
Former Mister Gay Chile, Salvador who became a Mister Gay World contestant and the winner of the last edition of Mr. Gay International competition in 2011, is the official national franchise holder of the Mister Gay World Organization in Chile since 2016. Salvador is the National Director after it was passed on by its predecessor, Mister Gay Chile, La Nueva Era, which had been the franchise holder from 2012 to 2013. Salvador live in Madrid, Spain and is the Regional Director of Mister Gay World for South America since 2018.
