= Miss Gay =

Miss Gay may refer to:

- Miss Gay America
- Miss Gay Philippines

== See also ==
- Mr Gay (disambiguation)
