= Mr Gay Chile =

Mr Gay Chile is the national integral beauty title for Chilean gay men. The choice of candidates is based not only on physical attributes. Communication skills are measured from applicants, their form of expression and, above all, the level of commitment of each participant with causes and values of the gay community. The last Grand Finale of this competition was in March, 2024.

The greatest success of Chile in International Mr. Gay contest was in February 2011, when Pablo Salvador Sepúlveda, Mr. Gay Chile 2009–10, won the title of International Mr Gay Competition.

The current Mr. Gay Chile titleholder is Cristian Valencia from Curacaví, a small town near to the capitol of the country. Cristian was not crowned by his predecessor, as Juan José Villavicencio lives in Spain and could not attend the 2026 coronation. Likewise, J.J. Villavicencio was not crowned by his predecessor, Francisco Aros, who resides in Malta.

The greatest success of Chile in Mr Gay World was in October 2022, when Jesús Castillo ranked Chile to the top 5 of the contest for first time. Previously, in May 2017, Juan Pedro Pavez Bohle won the sashes of Mr. Sport Challenge and Mr. Fashion Show and ranked Chile to the top 10 of the contest for the first time.

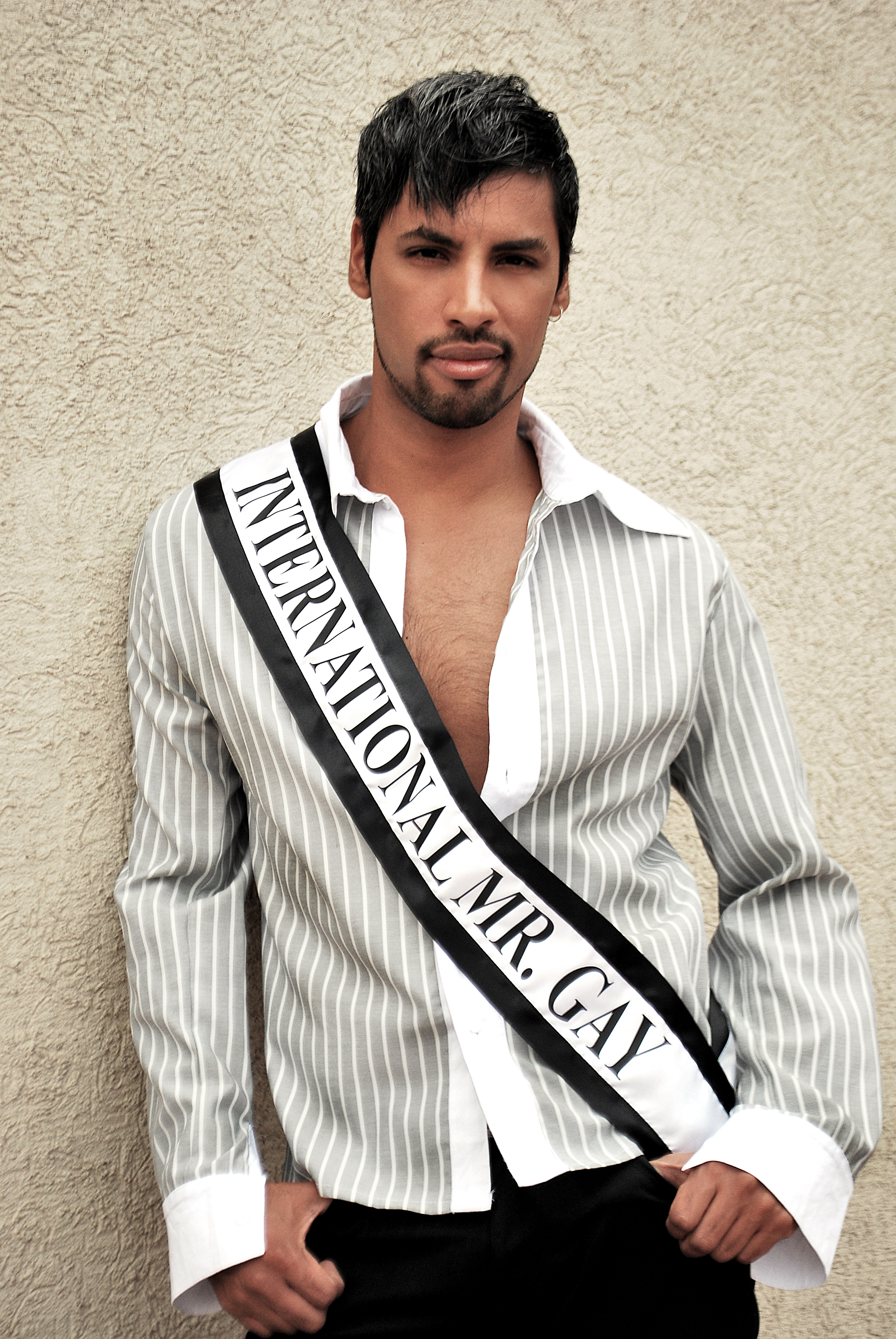
Pablo Salvador International Mr. Gay Titleholder

== Titleholders by Regions ==
Year	City, region or community represented	Mr Gay Chile	City Host of the coronation
2026	Chile Curacaví, Metropolitan Region	Cristian Valencia	Santiago de Chile, Metropolitan Region of Santiago
2024	Chile Viña del Mar city, Valparaíso region	Juan José Villacivencio	Rancagua City, O'Higgins región
2023	Malta Chilean community in Malta /Chile / Antofagasta region	Francisco Aros	La Valetta, Malta
2020	Chile Los Andes, Valparaiso region	Jesús Castillo	Santiago, Metropolitan Region
2019	Chile Peumo, O’Higgins region	Carlos Navarro	Santiago, Metropolitan Region
2018	Chile San Vicente de Tagua Tagua, O’Higgins region.	René Rivera	Rancagua City, O'Higgins región
2017	Chile Puerto Montt City, Los Lagos region	Juan Pedro Pavez	Rancagua City, O'Higgins region
2016	Chile Temuco, La Araucania region.	Jordan Eduardo Saavedra	Santiago, Metropolitan region
2014	Chile Antofagasta City, Antofagasta region.	Diego Felipe González Varas	Santiago, Metropolitan region
2013	Chile Santiago City, Metropolitan region.	Jean Daniel Muñoz	Santiago, Metropolitan region
2012	Chile Santiago City, Metropolitan region	Hector Enrique Cáceres	Santiago, Metropolitan region
2012	Chile Valparaíso, Valparaíso region / Finland Chilean Community in Finland.	Christopher Romo Terraza	Not contest was held.
2012	Chile Santiago City, Metropolitan region.	Alexis Cabrera	Santiago, Metropolitan region
2011	Chile Puerto Montt City, Los Lagos region.	Alex Klocker	Viña del Mar, Valparaíso region
2010	Panama Chilean community in Panama / Chile Santiago City, Metropolitan region	Pablo Salvador Sepúlveda	Santiago, Metropolitan region
2009	Chile Santiago City, Metropolitan region.	Roberto Alvarez	Santiago City, Metropolitan region.

== Purpose ==
The purpose of Mister Gay Chile titleholders is to project a positive image of gay men. The 2021 winner will be chosen by popular vote of the followers of contest and the vote of a jury panel. In case of a tie the competition organizers can appeal to the audience vote in the grand finale.

== Mr. Gay Chile Titleholders ==
- 2009 – Roberto Andres Alvarez Alvarado (he competed in Mr Gay World 2009).
- 2010 – Pablo Salvador Sepúlveda Mr Gay World Chile 2010 and Mr. Gay International 2011 winner.
- 2011 - Alex Klocker.
- 2012 - Alexis Cabrera.
- 2012 - Christopher Alejandro Romo Mr Gay World Chile 2012.
- 2012 - Hector Cáceres Mister Gay Chile for Mr. Gay International.
- 2013 - Jean Daniel Mr Gay World Chile 2013.
- 2014 - Diego Felipe González.
- 2015 - The contest was not held.
- 2016 - Jordan Saavedra Mr Gay World Chile 2016.
- 2017 - Juan Pedro Pavez Bohle Mr Gay World Chile 2017.
- 2018 - René Rivera Mr Gay World Chile 2018.
- 2019 - Carlos Navarro Mr Gay World Chile 2019.
- 2020 - 2022 Jesús Castillo Mr Gay World Chile 2022.
- 2023 Francisco Aros Mr Gay World Chile 2023.
- 2024 Juan José Villavicencio Mr Gay World Chile 2024.
- 2026 Cristian Valencia Mr Gay World Chile 2026.

== Mr. Gay World Chile Titleholders ==
- 2009 – Roberto Andres Alvarez Alvarado (he competed in Mr Gay World 2009).
- 2010 – Pablo Salvador Sepúlveda Mr Gay World Chile 2010 and Mr. Gay International 2011 winner.
- 2011 - ---------
- 2012 - Christopher Alejandro Romo Mr Gay World Chile 2012.
- 2013 - Jean Daniel Mr Gay World Chile 2013.
- 2014 - ---------
- 2015 - ---------
- 2016 - Jordan Saavedra Mr Gay World Chile 2016.
- 2017 - Juan Pedro Pavez Bohle Mr Gay World Chile 2017.
- 2018 - René Rivera Mr Gay World Chile 2018.
- 2019 - Carlos Navarro Mr Gay World Chile 2019.
- 2020 - ---------
- 2021 - ---------
- 2022 - Jésus Castillo Mr Gay World Chile 2022.
- 2023 - Francisco Aros Mr Gay World Chile 2023.
- 2024 - Juan José Villavicencio Mr Gay World Chile 2024.
- 2026 - Cristian Valencia Mr Gay World Chile 2026 (TBA).

== International Mr. Gay Chile Titleholders ==
- 2011 – Pablo Salvador Sepúlveda Mr Gay World Chile 2010 and Mr. Gay International 2011 winner.
- 2012 - Héctor Enrique Cáceres Hector Cáceres Mister Gay Chile for Mr. Gay International.

== Mr. Gay Chile 2009 ==
Mr Gay Chile
- Date: 3 November 2008
- Venue: Hotel Radisson Ciudad Empresarial.
- Entrants: 14
- Placements: 3
- Winner: Roberto Álvarez from Santiago.

In the first and second competition, the selection of candidates was conducted by the advertising agency Tsunami after a personal interview. The Mr. Gay Chile competition was created by Gay Phone, the most visited phone chat of the country, as part of its social responsibility policy, and has the backing of MOVILH, the leading advocacy organization for the GLBT community. Titleholders have represented Chile in international competitions: Mr. Gay International and Mr Gay World.

The choice of Mr. Gay Chile has changed in each issue. In the first edition, candidates faced a panel of judges headed by politician Marco Enríquez-Ominami in the grand finale at the Radisson Hotel Ciudad Empresarial.

In November 2008, the first event was held in the Radisson Hotel of Ciudad Empresarial. The event began with the presentation of the 10 finalists, a total of 60 original applicants, and with sharp questions from the jury. The jury was composed of Marco Enríquez-Ominami, Oliver Leleux (owner of Gay Fone), the president of MOVILH, Rolando Jiménez, Latin America correspondent for Rolling Stone magazine, Morten Andersen, the representative of Amnesty International, Patricio Quevedo, the president of Chile Gay Sports, Ricardo León and the presidente of the Social Action Center for Diversity, Ricardo Santos.

The jury evaluated the knowledge of the candidates on the main causes of the LGBT movement, and on the rights of other discriminated groups. Delegates: Roberto Alvarez, Leandro Urzay from Argentina, Carlos Foncea, Claudio Ortiz, Jorge Valenzuela, Pablo Chamoli from Peru, Juan Pablo Ramírez, Andrés Barrientos, Gastón Bustos, Álvaro Pastrian, Renato Montoya, Agustín Hernández from Argentina and Pablo Salvador Sepúlveda.

The jury selected three finalists, who went to a second round of questions, those elected were: Roberto Alvarez, Alvaro Pastrian and Pablo Salvador Sepúlveda. The winning prize was one million pesos in cash. Roberto Andres Alvarez Alvarado (28) Chemical Technical, won the competition. About his victory Roberto Alvarez said: "I know I'm not the most handsome gay Chile, but if I dared to compete and contribute to ending the cartoons. I feel I can contribute to combat discrimination". Alvarez was invited to TVN program, Animal Nocturno, and was the face of the Gay Fone advertising for a year.

== Mr. Gay Chile 2010 ==
Mr Gay Chile
- Date: 8 December 2009
- Hosts: Nando Ruíz
- Venue: Hotel Radisson Ciudad Empresarial.
- Entrants: 25
- Placements: Top 10 semifinalists / Top 3 finalists.
- Winner: Pablo Salvador from Santiago.

In December 2009, the second competition was held in the Radisson Hotel of Ciudad Empresarial. In the second edition, a total of 25 candidates competed in an online poll. The 10 candidates with more popular support became finalists, from a total of 60 original applicants, and faced a panel of judges led by photographer and TV host Jordi Castell. The finalists was: Michel González, Jorge Lira, Pablo Salvador Sepúlveda (winner), Claudio Muñoz, Diego Saa, Francisco Guajardo, Matías Aguilera (from Santiago City, First Runner Up), Camilo Carrasco, Alfredo Cabrera (from Concepción) y Alexis Romero (from Punta Arenas, Second Runner Up).

In 2010 February, Pablo Salvador Sepúlveda represents Chile in the second edition of the Mr Gay World in Oslo, Norway. Pablo's participation was praised by the press and by the judges, especially in the personal interview. Returning to Chile, Pablo Salvador Sepúlveda dedicated his reign as Mister Gay Chile to social causes as the fight against bullying and homophobia, with constant appearances in the press and gay community activities. In January 2011, Pablo Salvador Sepúlveda competed in the International Mr Gay Competition. For the first time in the competition involved a Chilean delegate.

== Mr. Gay Chile 2011 ==
Mr Gay Chile
- Date: 18 December 2010
- Hosts: Nando Ruíz and Randy Drag
- Venue: Club Divino, Viña del Mar.
- Entrants: 10
- Placements: 3
- Winner: Alex Klocker from Puerto Montt

In the third edition of the contest was decided by a jury composed of representatives of the gay community, Gay Fone and the reigning Mr Gay Chile Pablo Salvador Sepúlveda.

On December 17 Alex Klocker was voted by phone and direct public Divine Club (Viña del Mar, Valparaíso).

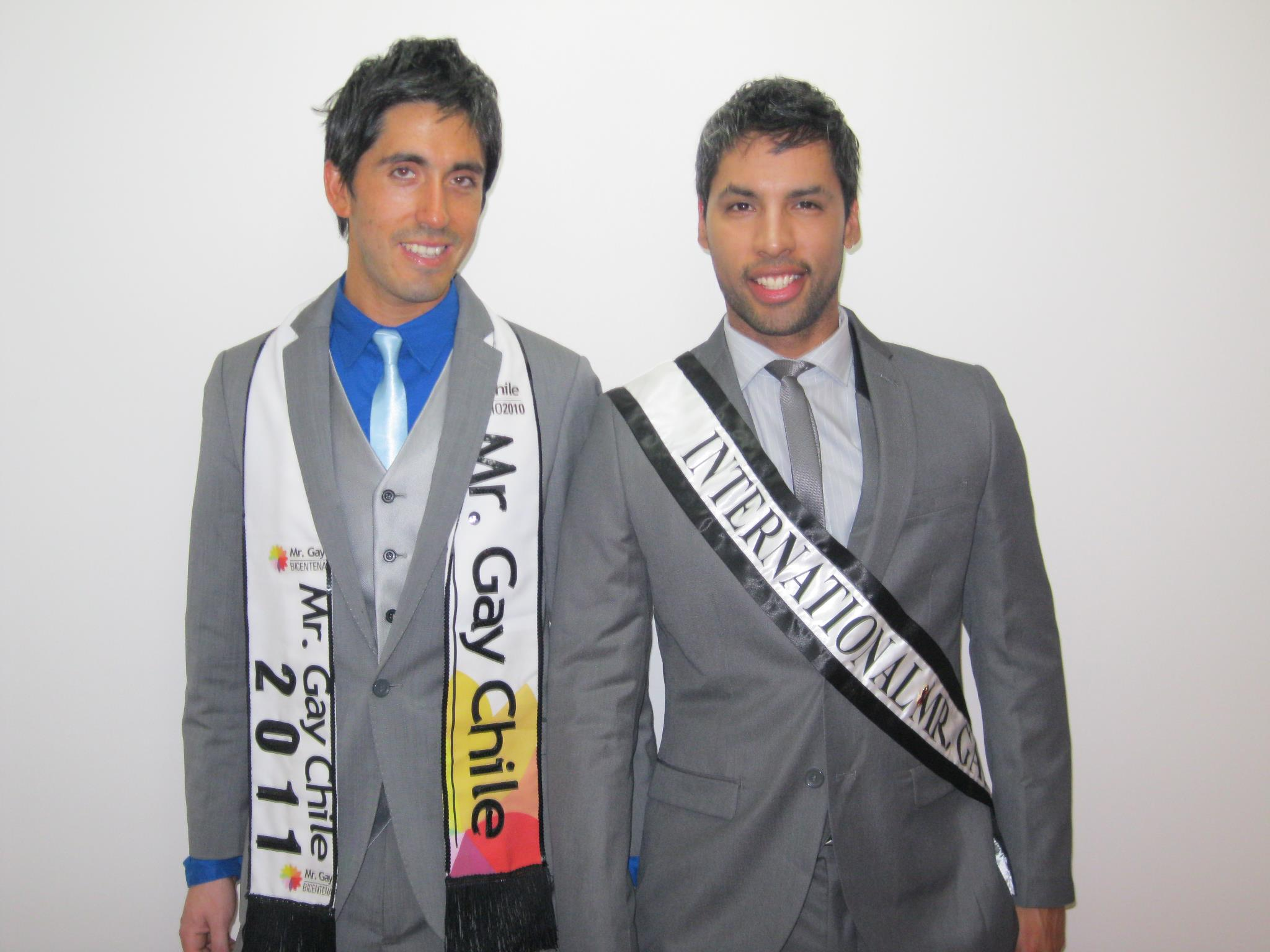
Alex Klocker de Puerto Montt, Mr. Gay Chile 2011 y Pablo Salvador International Mr. Gay 2011 - 2012 y ex Mr. Gay Chile.

In the third edition of the competition by a jury selected 10 finalists are faced with an online vote that defined the 50% score. The other 50% was defined by the votes of the audience at the Grand Finale.

Alex Klocker has a degree in Architecture and was born in the city of Puerto Montt. During his reign participated in various activities of the gay community. For the first time Chile missed the contest due to lack of sponsorship to send the candidate.

== Mr. Gay Chile 2012 ==
Mr Gay Chile
- Date: 12 November 2011.
- Venue: Capricho Español Restaurant.
- Entrants: 2
- Placements: 1
- Winner: Alexis Cabrera from Santiago.

In the fourth edition of the competition, made a private choice. Only 2 candidates competed. The organisation in charge of the company TILT SA (owner of Gay Fone), convened a panel of judges, Alexis Cabrera as the new Mr. Gay Chile. Despite the controversy generated by this latest version of the competition, the organisation announced that next year will use the same format.

In October 2011, in a private competition in the restaurant "Capricho Español" of the city of Santiago, Alexis Cabrera was elected as Mr. Gay Chile 2012. The official presentation of Cabrera was done in the Gay Parade. Only 2 candidates competed. The organisation in charge of the company TILT SA (owner of Gay Fone), convened a panel of judges, Alexis Cabrera as the new Mr. Gay Chile. Despite the controversy generated by this latest version of the competition, the organisation announced that next year will use the same format. Alexis Cabrera did not participate in more activities as Mr. Gay Chile. Alexis Cabrera comes as Mr. Gay Fone and is host of Troya, in Farandula Gay Web Channel.

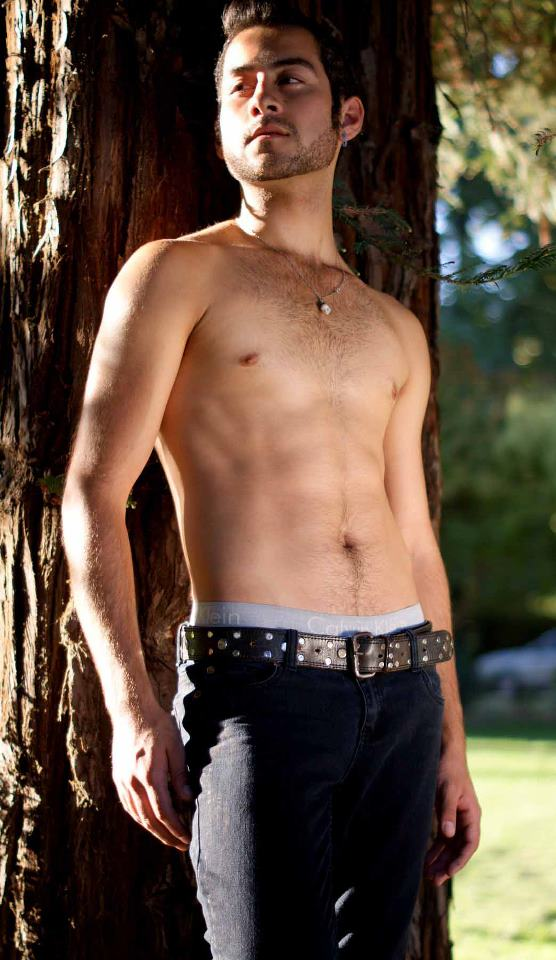
Jean Daniel representó a Chile en Mr. Gay World 2013.

== Mister Gay Chile 2012 - 2013 ==
Mr Gay Chile
- Date: 28 May 2012
- Hosts: Karen Doggenweiler and Heather Kunstt.
- Venue: Centro Arte Alameda.
- Broadcaster: Canal Farándula Gay
- Entrants: 12
- Placements: 5
- Winner: Jean Muñoz and Héctor Cáceres, both from Santiago.

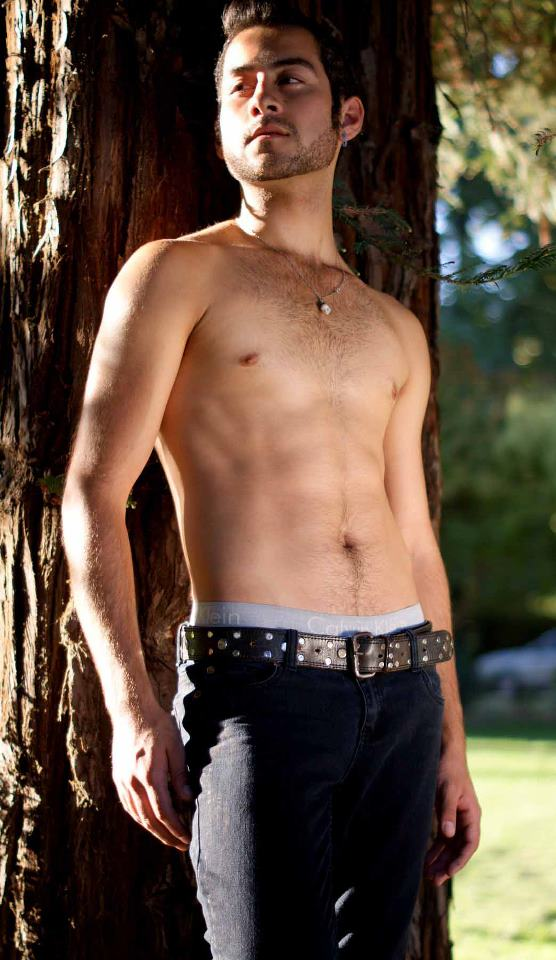
Jean Daniel Muñoz in Mr Gay World 2013.

Between 2012 and 2013, the contest was organized by "Mister Gay Chile, La Nueva Era". The predecessor of this new competition was "Mr. Gay Chile" organized by Gay Phone. The Mister Gay Chile The New Era competition elected Chilean delegates for international titles: Christopher Alejandro Romo for Mr Gay World 2012 (by designation). Héctor Cáceres for International Mr. Gay 2012, Jean Daniel for Mr Gay World 2013.

On May 28, 2012, was performed for the first time the contest Mister Gay Chile, The New Era in Alameda Art Center in Santiago. The hosts of the contest was the TV star Karen Doggenweiler and the drag queen Heather Kunstt. The jury was composed of former presidential candidate Marco Enriquez- Ominami again, among other prominent figures. After competing in challenges, photo shoots, interviews and runway shows, the jury chose the 5 finalists among 12 candidates. Javier Mendez (from Concepción city) was chosen Mister Popularity (by online vote), Mister Photogenic and First Runner Up. Emilio Riveros was elected Mr. Congeniality for the delegates. After giving the jury answers Hector Caceres and Jean Daniel were the winners of the night. Hector Caceres was elected Mister Gay Chile International 2012 and Jean Daniel was elected Mr. Gay World Chile 2013. The dancer Jean Daniel was the Chilean delegate in Mr Gay World 2013 competition in Antwerp, Belgium.

== Sixth Edition: Mister Gay Chile 2014 ==
Mr Gay Chile
- Date: 30 August 2013
- Hosts: Karen Doggenweiler, Pablo Salvador and Heather Kunstt.
- Venue: Novedades Theater.
- Broadcaster: Canal Farándula Gay
- Entrants: 8
- Placements: 2
- Winner: Diego Felipe González Varas from Antofagasta.

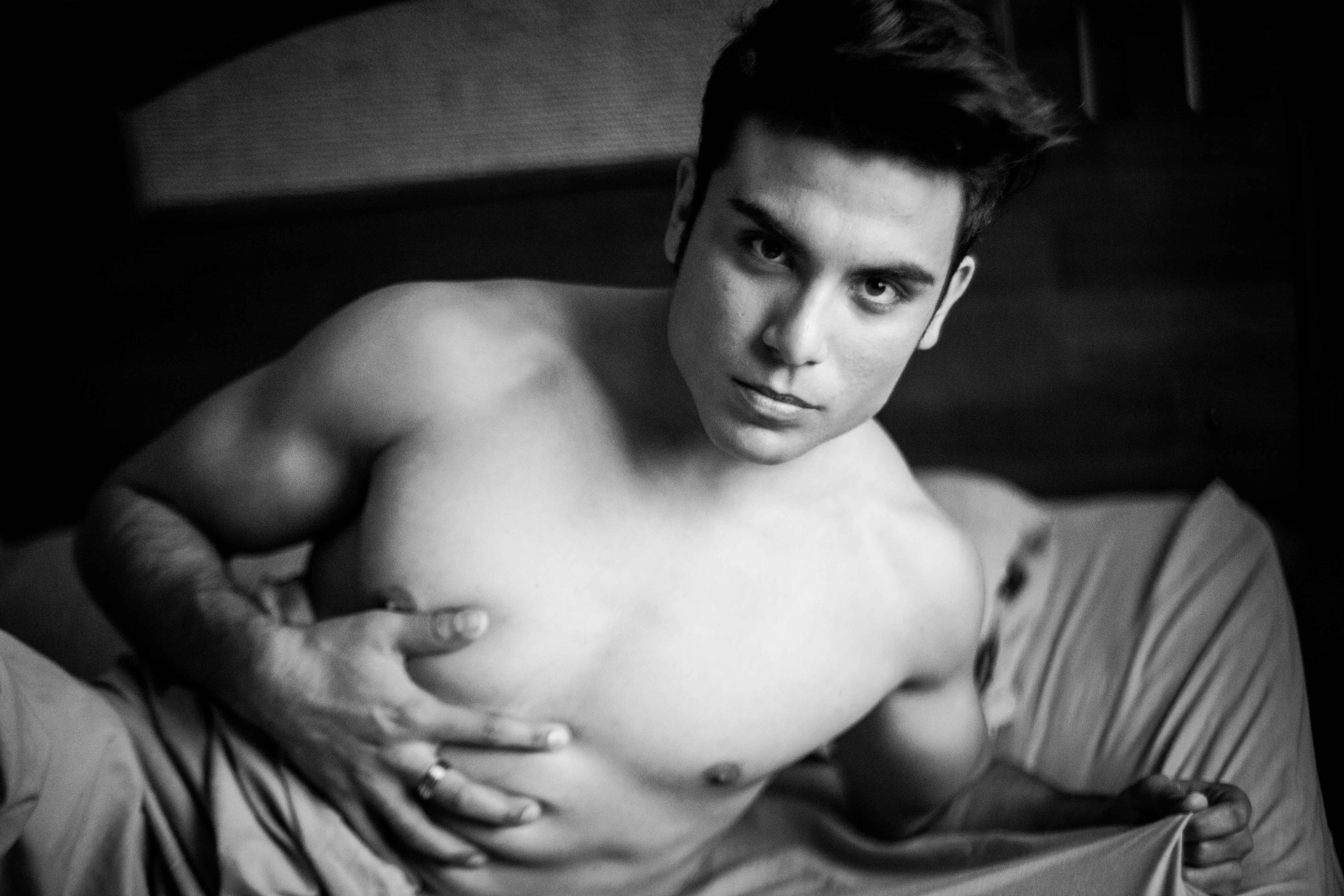
Mr Gay Chile 2014 Diego Felipe González.

On August 30, 2013, was performed the "Mister Gay Chile" Grand Finale on Novedades Theater in Santiago. The hosts of the contest was the star of TV Karen Doggenweiler, the singer Heather Kunstt and the former Mr. Gay Chile and Mr. Gay International 2011 Pablo Salvador Sepúlveda. The jury was composed for specialist in fashion and prominent figures of LGBT associations. After competing in challenges, photo shoots, interviews and runway shows, the jury chose the winner and the first runner up among 8 candidates. Tomás Hernández the youngest contender (from city of Concepción, Bio-Bio region) was chosen Mister Popularity and Mister Photogenic both awards by voting online. Tomás was an epic fail in Question and Answer round. Iván Rivas aka "Pollo Gómez" (from Coquimbo City, Coquimbo region), was elected for the Organization as Mr. Social Networks, and Camilo Muñoz (from the small town of Teno, Maule region) was elected for the delegates as Mr. Congeniality. After giving the jury answers Camilo Muñoz was elected as First Runner Up and Diego Felipe González (from Antofagasta City, Antofagasta region) was elected as Mister Gay Chile. Diego not represented Chile in Mr Gay World 2014.

== Seventh Edition: Mister Gay Chile 2016 ==
Mr Gay Chile
- Date: 29 January 2016
- Hosts: Victoria Fanttini and Pablo Salvador.
- Venue: Nueva Cero Discotheque
- Broadcaster: Canal Farándula Gay
- Entrants: 8
- Placements: 3
- Winner: Jordan Saavedra from La Araucanía.
- 1st runner up: Alejandro Merino from Santiago.

Since October 2015, Pablo Salvador Sepúlveda is National Director of the contest. Since 2016, Pablo Salvador Sepúlveda is Director of Mr Gay World in Chile.

The Mister Gay Chile 2016 winner was Jordan Saavedra (25), Dancer and student of Kinesiology. Jordan won the national competition in January 2016 and will compete in Mr. Gay World 2016. The Mr. Gay Chile 2016 was the 7th edition of the contest, and was held on 29 January 2016 at the Nueva Cero Discotheque in Santiago City, Metropolitan Region, Chile. The preliminary took place on 22 January in the same venue. At the end of Grand Finale, Jordan Saavedra from Temuco City, La Araucanía Region, was crowned Mister Gay Chile 2016. This contest was the first edition under a new director, Pablo Salvador Sepúlveda. 8 contestants competed for the Mr. Gay Chile title. Jordan Saavedra won also Mr. Talent and Mr. Photogenic awards. The first runner up, Alejandro Merino from Chillan City, Bío - Bío Region, also won the Mr. Body and Mr. Popularity awards. The second runner up was Mauricio González from Santiago City, the third runner up was Lister Aparicio from Concepción City, Bío - Bío Region and the fourth runner up was Michel González from San Fernardo City, O`Higgins Region. The semifinalists were Alexis Echeverría, José Tomás Manríquez and Ariel Martínez De La Fuente (Mr. Congeniality award) all from Santiago City, Metropolitan Region. Jordan Saavedra was the Chilean delegate in Mr Gay World 2016 competition in Malta, Europe, he had not won any award and was not elected in the Top 10.

== Eighth Edition: Mister Gay Chile 2017 ==
Mr Gay Chile
- Date: 7 January 2017
- Entertainment: Gia, Felipink (singers) and Jordan Saavedra (dance) / Pablo Salvador Sepúlveda and Francisca Thompson (hosts).
- Broadcaster: Canal Farándula Gay
- Entrants: 36.
- Placements: 15.
- Debuts: Arica, Antofagasta, El Loa, Coquimbo, Valparaíso, Marga Marga, Petorca, Los Andes, San Felipe de Aconcagua, Maipo, Melipilla, Cordillera, O'Higgins, Maule, Los Ríos and Los Lagos
- Withdrawals: La Araucanía.
- Winner: Juan Pedro Pávez from Los Lagos.

Mister Gay Chile 2017, the 8th Mister Gay Chile contest, was held on 7 January 2017 at the Acqua Diva Discotheque, in Rancagua City, Chile. Juan Pedro Pavez Bohle of Los Lagos Region crowned by Jordan Saavedra of La Araucanía Region at the end of the event. Thirty-six contestants competed in this year. This was the second edition of the Mister Gay Chile contest to be held under the direction of Pablo Salvador former Mr. Gay Chile, Mr. Gay World Chile 2010 and International Mr. Gay 2011–2012. Among the highlights in this contest will include the debut of regional delegates in the competition and a record of contestants.

Mr. Gay Chile 2017 winner:Juan Pedro Pavez Bohle.Juan Pedro Pávez, 29, General Accountant and Dancer. Juan Pedro also won the preliminary competitions of Best national costume, Mr. Talent and Mr. Body.

Top 5: Second Place: Jesús Castillo from Los Andes Province. Jesús Castillo, 27, Zumba Instructor and Monitor against Gender Violence. Jesús won the preliminary competitions of Beauty With a Purpose, Popularity and Mr. Twitter. Third Place: Estefano De La Rivera form Valparaíso Province. Estefano De La Rivera, 23, Commercial Engineering student.Estefano won the preliminary competition of Mr. Social Networks. Fourth Place: Andreas Puyol from Santiago Province. Andreas Puyol, 27, Publicist and Actor. Andreas won the preliminary competition of Mr. Photogenic, Fifth Place: Francisco Aros from Antofagasta Region. Francisco Aros, 29, Mechanical Engineer.

Top 10:

- Mr. Gay Arica – Alberto Schulze, 36, Lawyer.
- Mr. Gay Coquimbo - Michael Leroy, 30, Hair Technician.
- Mr. Gay Melipilla - Marco Antonio Zúñiga, 30, Management Technician.
- Mr. Gay Maipo- Fran Santin, 26, Actor. Fran won the competition Mr. Congeniality.
- Mr. Gay Maule- Joshe Vargas, 21, Personal Trainer, Physiotherapist and chiropractic student.

Top 15:

- Mr. Gay Antofagasta – Óscar Durán, 23, Model.
- Mr. Gay Petorca – Gianfranco Macchiavello, 21, Audiovisual Technician student.
- Mr. Gay Marga Marga – Alberto López, 23, Educational Psychology student.
- Mr. Gay O’Higgins- Patricio Parraguez, 23, Agribusiness and agricultural technician and student of Foreign Trade.
- Mr. Gay Los Ríos – Javier Chacón, 19, student and salesman.

The greatest success of Chile in Mr Gay World was in May 2017, when Juan Pedro Pavez Bohle won the sashes of Mr. Sport Challenge and Mr. Fashion Show and ranked Chile to the top 10 of the contest for the first time.

== Ninth Edition: Mister Gay Chile 2018 ==
Mr Gay Chile
- Date: 13 January 2018
- Hosts: Francisca Thompson and Pablo Salvador.
- Entertainment: Juan Pedro (dancer).
- Broadcaster: Canal Femme
- Entrants: 13 (8 finalists)
- Placements: 3
- Debuts: Santiago Centro, Santiago Sur, Santiago Poniente, Santiago Oriente and Algarrobo,
- Withdrawals: El Loa, Coquimbo, Petorca, Los Andes, San Felipe de Aconcagua, Melipilla, Cordillera, Maule and Los Lagos
- Returns: Bío-Bío.
- Winner: Rene Rivera from O´higgins region.

The 9th Mister Gay Chile contest, was held on January 13, 2018, at the Acqua Diva Discotheque, in Rancagua City, Chile. Rene Rivera from O´higgins region was crowned as Mr. Gay Chile 2018 by Juan Pedro Pavez Bohle Mr. Gay Chile 2017, at the end of the event. The contender's presentation was held in September 2017 at the Acqua Diva Discotheque. Thirteen contestants competed for the crown. Rene was the Chilean delegate in Mr Gay World 2018 competition in South Africa, Africa, he had not won any award and was not elected in the Top 10.

This was the third edition of the Mister Gay Chile contest to be held under the direction of Pablo Salvador former Mr. Gay Chile, Mr. Gay World Chile 2010 and International Mr. Gay 2011–2012.

Top 3:

- Second Runner Up: José Miguel Paredes Mr. Gay Santiago Sur.
- First Runner Up: Matías Ramírez Mr. Gay Valparaíso.
- Winner: René Rivera Mr. Gay O´Higgins.

Specials Awards: Golden Medals:

- Mr. Photogenic, Mr. Fashion, Mr. Congeniality: René Rivera Mr. Gay O´Higgins.
- Mr. Social Project, Mr. Sports and Mr. Popularity: Matías Ramírez Mr. Gay Valparaíso.
- Mr. Body and Mr. Social Networks: José Miguel Paredes Mr. Gay Santiago Sur.
- Regional Costume and Mr. Talent: Kevin Grau Mr. Gay Maipo.
- Mr. Talent: Nathan Castro Mr. Gay Algarrobo.

Silver Medals:

- Regional Costume: Nathan Castro Mr. Gay Algarrobo.
- Mr. Sports and Mr. Runway: Luis David Matus Mr. Gay Bío-Bío.

Bronze Medals:

- Mr. Sports: René Rivera Mr. Gay O´Higgins.
- Regional Costume: René Rivera Mr. Gay O´Higgins.

== Tenth Edition: Mister Gay Chile 2019 ==
Mr Gay Chile
- Date: Saturday, February 23, 2019.
- Hosts: Héctor Cáceres, Mr. Gay Chile 2012 and Pablo Salvador, Director Mr. Gay World in South America and former Mr. Gay Chile and Mr. Gay International winner.
- Entertainment: Nueva Cero Discotheque Cast.
- Venue: Nueva Cero Discotheque, in Santiago City.
- Broadcaster: Canal Equinoxio and Divas del Transformismo (in Spanish).
- Director: Pablo Salvador.
- Entrants: 16 contenders and Top 8 Finalists.
- Placements: 05.
- Debuts: Chillán City, Ñuble region.
- Withdrawals: Were not counted..
- Winner: Carlos Navarro from O`Higgins Region.

Mister Gay Chile 2019 was the 10th Mister Gay Chile competition. René Rivera of O´Higgins region crowned his successor at the end of the event Noche de Coronación (Coronation Night), Carlos Navarro from O`Higgins region too, as the new Mr. Gay Chile. Carlos Navarro, 30, from the Peumo City, O'higgins region, is a fashion designer who has his own brand 'Cienago'. As a candidate for the title of Mr. Gay Chile, Carlos launched a collection of his brand entitled 'Manifesto' (manifesto). Manifesto is an activist fashion collection with messages of empowerment for the Lgbtiq + community.

At Nueva Cero Discotheque, the night of the coronation of Mr. Gay Chile was held, whose winner will represent the country at Mr. Gay World 2019 to be held in Cape Town, South Africa. After months of competitions, the candidate Carlos Navarro won the crown and the sovereign band. The casting to select the candidates will be held on 25 August 2018 in Santiago City. Later the organization of the contest carried out two more castings. The contest considered a series of events between the months of October 2018 and February 2019, in a format that was called Mr. Gay On Tour.

Initially 16 candidates competed for the title. Only eight candidates qualified for the final of the competition. Guillermo Hermosilla (teacher of Biology) took the second place, who also won the Mr. Social Networks award; The third place went to Hans Carrasco (nurse), along with the recognition as Mr. Talent, Mr. Social Contribution and Mr. Photogenic. Diego Molina won the Mr. Popularity award; and Carlos Navarro, in addition to being the winner of the night, also won the Mr. Body and Mr. Sport awards. The night was animated by Héctor Cáceres, Mr. Gay Chile 2012 and Pablo Salvador, Director Mr. Gay World in South America and former Mr. Gay Chile and Mr. Gay International winner.

Carlos Navarro is an activist, works extensively on issues of inclusion and non-discrimination in the company where he works and providing support for sexual diversity and gender equity. Carlos Navarro will compete in Mr. Gay World 2019, in Cape Town, South Africa at the end of April. Unlike previous editions of Mr. Gay Chile the contest, the tenth edition did not consider the delivery of regional or provincial sashes to the candidates, so withdrawals were not counted.

Top 5:

- Fourth Runner Up: Diego Molina from Santiago.
- Third Runner Up: Sebastian Azócar from Santiago.
- Second Runner Up: Andrés Carrasco from Santiago.
- First Runner Up: Guillermo Hermosilla from Santiago.
- Winner: Carlos Navarro from O´Higgins region.

Specials Awards:

- Mr. Photogenic, Mr. Talent and Mr. Social Project: Andrés Carrasco from Santiago
- Mr. Congeniality: Omar Constanzo from Chillán.
- Mr. Popularity: Diego Molina from Santiago.
- Mr. Body and Mr. Sports : Carlos Navarro from O´Higgins region.
- Mr. Social Networks: Guillermo Hermosilla from Santiago.

On November 5, 2019, the Organization of the Mr. Gay Chile contest announced the suspension of the 2020 edition of the competition.

== Designated Titleholders: Mister Gay Chile 2020-2023 ==
On November 5, 2019, Pablo Salvador the National Director of Mr. Gay Chile contest announced the suspension of the 2020 edition of the competition.

Mr. Gay Chile 2020 casting would take place in the city of Santiago, on November 8, 2019.

In the communiqué spread on social networks, Pablo Salvador informed that in the context of social protests and by the impossibility of financing the costs of the contest through the events, it was decided not to run the competition.

Carlos Navarro of O´Higgins region crowned his successor Jesús Castillo as Mr. Gay Chile 2020, at the end of the event "Noche de Coronación" (Coronation Night) on Saturday, 17 January 2020. Jesus Castillo from Los Andes, was First Runner Up at Mr. Gay Chile 2017 competition. Jesús is personal trainer, entrepreneur and activist.

Finally, Jesus competed on Mr. Gay World 2022 and was third runner up.

On Mr. Gay World 2023, the National Director designated to Francisco Aros to represent Chile. Francisco won the National Costume Award on the international competition.

== Eleventh Edition: Mister Gay Chile 2024 ==
Mr Gay Chile
- Date: March 16, 2024.
- Hosts: Juan Pedro Pavez Bohle.
- Entertainment: Mr. Gay Chile 2024 contestants.
- Venue: Acqua Diva Discotheque.
- Broadcaster: El Factor B YouTube Channel.
- Winner: Juan José Villavicencio from Viña del Mar city.

On March 01, 2024, the 12 contestants for the title of Mr. Gay Chile2024 were introduced to the audience on the Night of Misters event, in Fausto Discotheque, Santiago city. The contest included days of online competitions and coaching sessions.

Mr. Gay Chile 2024 grand finale was held in Acqua Diva Discotheque in Rancagua city and for the very first time a delegate from Viña Del Mar was the winner.

Jesus Castillo from Los Andes crowned to Juan José Villavicencio as the brand new Mr. Gay Chile 2024, at the end of the event "Noche de Coronación" (Coronation Night) on Saturday, 16 March 2024. Juan José will represent Chile at Mr. Gay World 2024 in England, next August. Results: Winner: Juan José Villavicencio, Mr. Gay Viña Del Mar. Juan José also won Mr. Instagram medal. 1st Runner Up: Nicolás Vásquez, Mr. Gay Santiago Sur. Nicolás also won Mr. Facebook medal. 2nd Runner Up: Guillermo “Yiyo” Hermosilla, Mr. Gay Santiago Centro. Guillermo also won Mr. Popularity medal. 3rd Runner Up: Sebastián Azocar, Mr. Gay Santiago Norte. Sebastián also won Mr. Tik Tok medal. 4th Runner Up: Chris Gómez, Mr. Gay Linares. 5th Runner Up: Sebastián Armijo, Mr. Gay Melipilla. Sebastián also won the Mr. X and Mr. Photogenic medals.

Other awards: Yhoel Macías, Mr. Gay Curicó won the Mr. Fitness medal. Diego Ríos, Mr. Gay Santiago Poniente won Mr. Spokesman medal. Marco Antonio Zúñiga, Mr. Eastern Island won Mr. Runaway.

== Twelve Edition: Mister Gay Chile 2026 ==
Mr Gay Chile
- Date: April 04, 2026
- Hosts: Juan Pedro Pavez Bohle
- Entertainment: Mr. Gay Chile 2026 contestants opening / Fashion show by Ricardo Oyarzun / Drag queen performance by Namusa Vage
- Venue: Teatro Bellavista, Santiago, Chile
- Broadcaster: Farandula Gay YouTube Channel
- Winner: Cristian Valencia from Curacaví city

During March 2026, seven contestants competed for the title of Mr. Gay Chile. Were introduced to the audience the Sash-Awarding Ceremony and in a summer thematic Night of Misters semifinal. The winner was electeb by a jury pannel in a grand finale in Teatro Bellavista, Santiago City.The contest included days of offline, online competitions and a coaching session.
