= Mr Gay World 2010 =

2010 beauty pageant

- Date: February 13, 2010
- Presenters: Will Fennell
- Entertainment: Velvet
- Venue: Nedre Vollgate 11, Oslo, Norway
- Broadcaster: World Wide Mr Gay Official Site
- Entrants: 23
- Placements: 10
- Debuts: Belgium; China; Hong Kong; Iceland; Italy; Poland; Russia; Switzerland; Thailand
- Withdrawals: Austria; Bulgaria; Colombia; Lithuania; Paraguay; Venezuela
- Returns: United States
- Winner: Charl Van Den Berg; South Africa
- Congeniality: Byron Adu; Australia; Cédric Fievet; Belgium; Rick Dean Twombley; Hong Kong; Walter Heidkampf; Norway; Charl Van den Berg; South Africa
- Best National Costume: Rick Dean Twombley; Hong Kong
- Photogenic: David Baramia; Russia

Mr Gay World 2010, the 2nd Mr Gay World pageant, was held at the Nedre Vollgate 11, in Oslo, Norway on February 13, 2010. Charl Van Den Berg of South Africa, was crowned Mr Gay World 2010 by outgoing titleholder Max Krzyzanowski from Ireland. 23 countries and territories competed for the title.

== Results ==
| Final results | Contestant |
|---|---|
| Mister Gay World 2010 | South Africa – Charl Van Den Berg |
| 1st Runner-Up | Australia – Byron Adu |
| 2nd Runner-Up | Hong Kong – Rick Dean Twombley |
| 3rd Runner-Up | China – Xindai Muyi |
| 4th Runner-Up | Spain – Sergio Lara |
| Top 10 | Brazil – Thiago Silvestre; Norway – Walter Heidkampf; Philippines – David Noel Bosley; Poland – Kamil Szmerdt; Russia – David Baramia |

=== Special awards ===
| Award | Contestant |
|---|---|
| Mr. Gay Swimwear | Russia – David Baramia |
| Mr. Gay Photogenic | Russia – David Baramia |
| Best National Costume | Hong Kong – Rick Dean Twombley |
| Mr. Gay Congeniality | Australia – Byron Adu; Belgium – Cédric Fievet; Hong Kong – Rick Dean Twombley; Norway – Walter Heidkampf; South Africa – Charl Van den Berg |

== Judges ==
- Carlene Ang Aguilar - Miss Philippines Earth 2001, top 10 in Miss Earth 2001, Binibining Pilipinas - World 2005, and top 15 semi-finalist in Miss World 2005.
- Eric Butter - President of Mr. Gay World Ltd.
- Andrew Craig - Founding Editor DNA Magazine.
- Jarl Haugedal - International businessman and entrepreneur.
- Will Kapfer - Journalist and Vice President, and Principal of Edge Media.
- Mirka Kraus - Psychologist, specialist in clinical psychology.
- Max Krzyzanowski - Mr Gay World 2009.
- Bruce Tallon - Chief Innovation Officer Consultant at Kempinski Hotels.

== Historical significance ==
- Countries who also made into the top 10 previous year were Australia and South Africa.
- Australia & South Africa placed for the second consecutive year.
- Brazil, China, Hong Kong, Norway, Philippines, Poland, Russia and Spain placed for the first time.

== Contestants ==
- Argentina - Maximiliano Duran
- Australia - Byron Adu
- Belgium - Cédric Fievet
- Brazil - Thiago Silvestre
- Canada - Darren Geoffrey Bruce
- Chile - Pablo Salvador Sepúlveda
- China - Xiadai Muyi
- Hong Kong - Rick Dean Twombley
- Iceland - Magnús Guðbergur Jónsson
- Ireland - Marcus Wynne
- Italy - Antony Cortinovis
- Mexico - Jair Vega
- New Zealand - Justin Glen Savage
- Northern Ireland - Drew Hanna
- Norway - Walter Heidkampf
- Philippines - David Noel Bosley
- Poland - Kamil Szmerdt
- Russia - David Baramia
- Spain - Sergio Lara
- South Africa - Charl van den Berg
- Switzerland - Tobias Dickenmann
- Thailand - Sorawit Piamthongkum
- USA - Brent Douglas Kuenning

=== Withdrawals ===
- Austria
- Bulgaria
- Colombia
- Lithuania
- Paraguay
- Venezuela

== Contestants notes ==
- Sergio Lara (Spain) is Mr Gay Europe 2009.
- Pablo Salvador Sepúlveda was contestant in the 2011 International Mr Gay Competition and won the title.
- Cédric Fievet (Belgium), Magnús Guðbergur Jónsson (Iceland), Antony Cortinovis (Italy), Walter Heidkampf (Norway), Kamil Szmerdt (Poland), David Baramia (Russia) and Sergio Lara (Spain) competed in Mr Gay Europe 2009 in Oslo, Norway. Sergio Lara (Spain) won Mr Gay Europe 2009, Magnús Guðbergur Jónsson (Iceland) placed in the Top 3 and Cédric Fievet (Belgium), Antony Cortinovis (Italy), Walter Heidkampf (Norway) and David Baramia (Russia) placed in the Top 12.
- Byron Adu (Australia) was contestant in the 2009 International Mr Gay Competition. He was placed 1st Runner-up. The IMG was scheduled for Manila in the Philippines for the summer of 2009, but the Manila team failed to produce the contest. The 2009 International Mr Gay winner was selected by an online popularity vote that named Switzerland’s Ricco Müller as the International Mr. Gay title holder for 2009 (USA was 2nd Runner Up).
- Xindai Muyi (China), took part in the Mr Gay World pageant despite Beijing's attempts to prevent him doing so.
