= Ashley Peternella =

Dutch TV personality

- Born: June 27, 1992 (age 33); Oranjestad, Aruba
- Television: OUTtv and The Big Audition
- Title: Mr. Gay Aruba 2013 (Winner); Mr Gay World 2013 (3rd Runner-Up); Mister World Netherlands 2019 (Winner); Mister World 2019 (Top 29)

Ashley Peternella (born June 27, 1992) is an Aruban tv host and beauty pageant titleholder. He hosted OUTtv and also was crowned Mister World Netherlands 2019 and Mr Gay Aruba.

== Television ==
On June 30, 2019, Ashley appeared in the Dutch version of The Big Audition on NPO3. He was auditioning for the role of TV presenter for the European Gay Lifestyle network OUTtv. Ashley was named one of the winners of the audition and was offered a contract with the network.

== Mr Gay World 2013 ==
As Mr Gay Aruba he competed in the Mr Gay World 2013 competition held in Antwerp, Belgium. He placed as 3rd runner-up and won the sports challenge award.

== UM Sportsman of the Year ==
In 2012 he won the UM Sportsman of the year award for winning the Latin Champions category of the 48th edition of the ETDS,

and for winning 3 gold medals at the NSTB 2012 Dutch Championship.
