= Charl van den Berg =

South African model and activist

- Occupations: Model, activist
- Years active: 2009–2015

Charl van den Berg (1981–2015) was a South African model and activist. He was Mr Gay South Africa 2009 and Mr Gay World 2010.

== Biography ==
=== Mr. Gay South Africa 2009 ===
In 2009, Van den Berg entered and won the nomination for Mr. Gay South Africa. This enabled Charl to marry his charity work with Health4Men (an American funded initiative focussed on the education of HIV/Aids) and the Animal Anti Cruelty League, during and after his bid for the title. At a gala event held at the Pretoria State Theatre Opera House in November 2009, Van den Berg won the Mr. Gay South Africa title, which enabled him to represent South Africa at the International Mr Gay World pageant in Oslo, Norway.

=== Mr. Gay World 2010 ===
In February 2010, Van den Berg beat out 22 International contestants to become the first African and South African to win a Mr. World title in history. Charl van den Berg was now the official titleholder of Mr. Gay World 2010 and became an International spokesperson for LGBT community.

=== Activism and recognition ===
Van den Berg was an official spokesperson on Diversity and Human Rights for minority groups around the world. He has travelled to Vancouver in February 2010 to participate in the closing of the Winter Games and Winter Pride in Canada. His other travels included trips to Namibia, where he attended the launch of their LGBTI Network as part of his initiative to bridge out into African countries where homosexuality is not recognised, becoming one of the network's official Ambassadors, Berlin where he attended the Christopher Street Parade as well as Gala Evenings where he raised the profile of The Mr Gay World Organization and the Philippines in December 2010 where he delivered a speech on HIV/Aids and addressed the international media.

It is my understanding that people are people before we are different. With regard to Mr. Gay South Africa, it is my aim to help break down stereotypes and differing mindsets in the global community and promote oneness and equality for all people by bridging the gap between those mindsets. Mr. Gay World presents me with a platform to work from and creates an opportunity in which to do that and it is an honour to serve the global community in this capacity!

— Charl van den Berg

Van den Berg was featured on the cover of Outlooks Magazine (Canadian & US-based) as well as in Die Raport, Pretoria News, Die Beeld, The Citizen, Cape Argus, Die Volksblad, Kulumag (Kulula.com's online mag) as well various other magazines in Europe, and was also featured in the January issue of DNA magazine. He had a 15-mins feature insert on DSTV's Kwela Lifestyle TV Show.

He was quoted and covered on various online Editorials in Africa, Asia, North and South America and Europe after winning his title.

He was an official ambassador for the It Gets Better Project, an initiative which was started in the USA to aid and assist adolescents in the coming out process, and has now been adopted by Radio Today Outspoken in SA.

Van den Berg appeared on Various Radio Stations in SA including 702 and Cape Talk 567, 94.7 FM Highveld Stereo, KFM, Jacaranda, Radio Today Outspoken (South Africa's only gay friendly radio station).

=== Death ===
Van den Berg died of lymphoma on 6 August 2015 at the age of 33.
