= Outlooks =

Defunct Canadian LGBT magazine

OUTLOOKS was a Canadian LGBT magazine, published 10 times annually (monthly excepting combined issues in July/August and December/January). Founded by Roy Heale in 1997 as a newsprint monthly, in 2009 the publication was purchased by Brett Taylor and was changed to a full gloss lifestyle magazine for the LGBT community. The head office was located in Calgary, Alberta.

In 2011 the publication was purchased by Mint Media Group in Toronto with a new editor, Jim Brosseau. There was an online version of the magazine and print subscribers were served by Canada Post, readers in major cities could also obtain copies at various businesses in gay village locations, and the publication was stocked at many Chapters/Indigo bookseller locations, making the magazine available to gay and lesbian readers outside traditional gay villages. Outlooks covered gay culture, bringing together editorial features by experts from across Canada on travel, politics, arts and entertainment, fashion, finance and issues of importance to Canada's LGBT communities from coast to coast.

On December 4, 2012, a news release was issued by the owner, Mint Media Publication (Patricia Salib), announcing that the publication was to be temporarily suspended to restructure the magazine for sustainability in a rapidly evolving market. Instead of reviving Outlooks, however, Mint Media has since repositioned its other publication, the local Toronto magazine In Toronto, into a national magazine branded as In Magazine.
