= Mr Gay World 2017 =

The 9th edition of Mr Gay World took place from May 5–10, 2017 in Madrid and Maspalomas, Spain. 21 contestants from all over the world will compete for the title and become an ambassador for the LGBT community. The reigning titleholder Mr. Gay World 2016 Roger Gosalbez from Spain crowned his successor John Raspado from Philippines, at the end of the event.

== Results ==
Final results	Contestant
Mister Gay World 2017	Philippines – John Raspado
1st Runner-Up	Spain – Candido Arteaga
2nd Runner-Up	Belgium – Raf Van Puymbroeck
3rd Runner-Up	Switzerland – Marco Tornese
4th Runner-Up	South Africa - Alexander Steyn
Top 10	Australia – David Francis (crowned the year after Australia's absence following Patrick MacDonald's withdrawal to compete in 2016); Austria – Michael Dalpiaz; Chile – Juan Pedro Pavez Bohle; Ecuador – Flavio Romero; India – Darshan Mandhana

== Contestants ==
21 contestants competed for the title:

Country	Contestant	Age	Position - Awards	Hometown	Notes
Australia	David Francis	35-37	Top 10		(Australia did not compete for one year after Patrick MacDonald's withdrawal in 2016)
Austria	Michael Dalpiaz	-----	Top 10	------	
Brazil	Vitor Hugo Trindade de Castro	-----		------	
Belgium	Raf Van Puymbroeck	21	2nd Runner Up	Vosselaar	
Chile	Juan Pedro Pavez Böhle	29	Top 10, Sport Challenge Winner and Fashion Show Winner	Los Lagos Region	
Czech Republic	Frantisek Pesek	-----		------	
Ecuador	Flavio Romero	27	Top 10	Portoviejo	
Finland	Joonas Nilsson	29		Turku	
India	Darshan Mandhana	31	Top 10	Mumbai	
Indonesia	Budi Alamsyah	29	Written test Winner,	------	
Mexico	Jorge Gonzalez	24		Zacatecas City	
New Zealand	Charlie Tredway	33	Sympathy Winner	Auckland	
Philippines	John Raspado	36	Mr. Gay World 2017, Swimsuit, Evening Dress, Interview, Vote Online and Social Media Winner.	Baguio	
Poland	Andrzej Berg Dalpiaz	-----		------	
South Africa	Alexander Steyn	33	Top 5 and Social Campaign Winner	Bloemfontein	
Spain	Cándido Arteaga	26	1st Runner Up, National Costume and Fotogenia Winner	Tenerife	
Slovak Republic	Jaromir Sufr	-----		------	
Switzerland	Marco Tornese	32	Top 5	Lausanne	
Taiwan	Touya Xiao	22		Taipei	
Thailand	Pattanajuk Vipadakul	30		Udon Thani	
Venezuela	Alberto Jose Rodriguez Rengifo	30		Caracas	
