= Andreas Derleth =

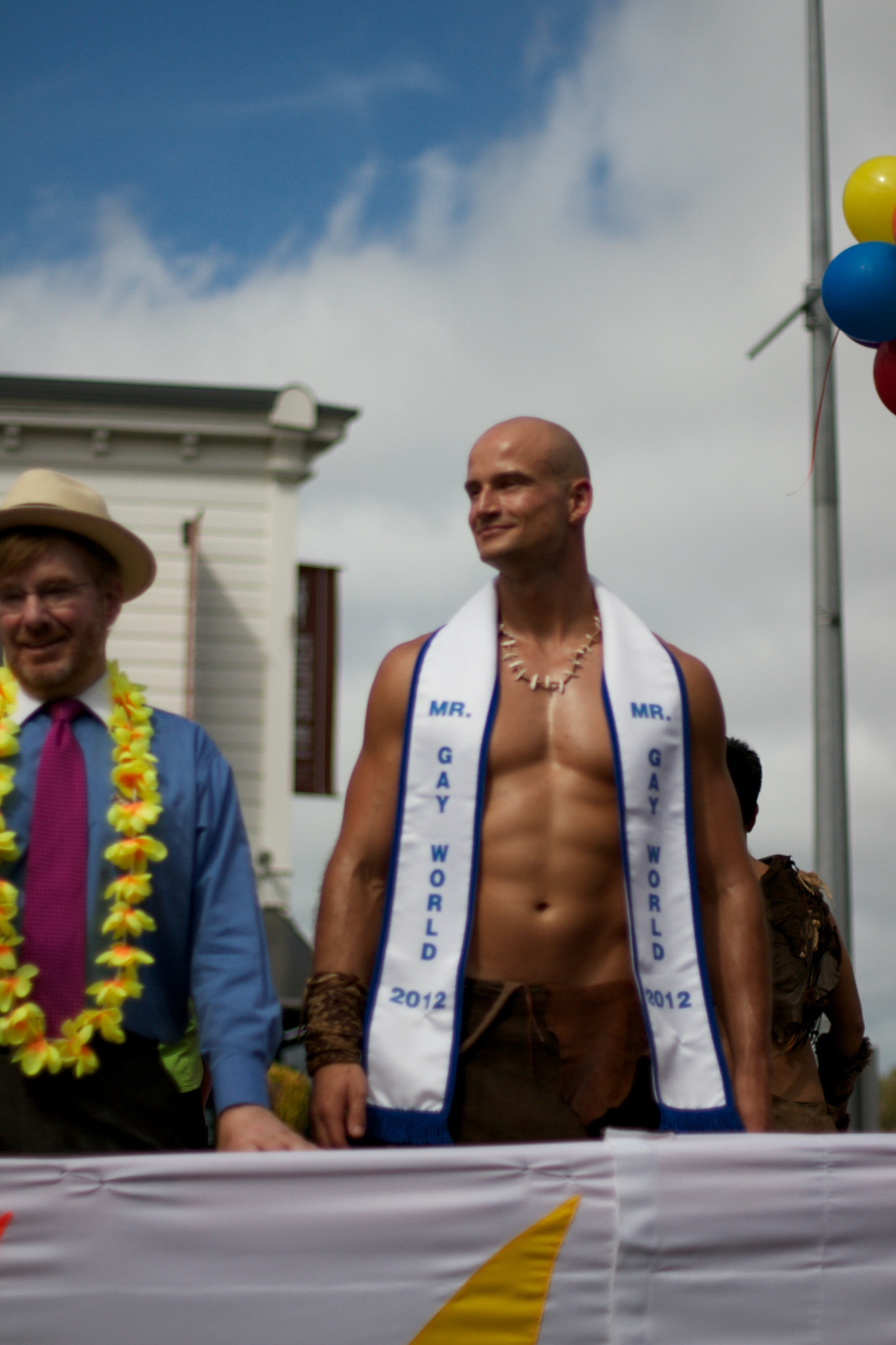
Andreas Derleth at the Auckland Pride Parade in Ponsonby in 2013

Andreas Derleth is a German-New Zealand winner of Mr Gay New Zealand 2012 in Auckland and Mr Gay World 2012 in Johannesburg.

After attending Baden-Württemberg Cooperative State University in Heidenheim, Germany, Derleth moved to New Zealand in 2008, becoming a manager at Warehouse Stationery in Auckland. In October 2014 Derleth became General Manager for Wireless Nation Limited.

The Mr Gay NZ is judged as part of the Big Gay Out run by the New Zealand AIDS Foundation in Auckland, which attracted Prime Minister John Key and other politicians. The 2012 entrants included Sylvain Taupenas, Aaron Gordon and Marcus Fenson (Mr Gay Wellington).

Derleth has also featured on the cover of Gay Express, a New Zealand Gay newspaper.

In 2016, Derleth was a judge for Mr Gay World.
