= Mr Gay World 2012 =

- Date: April 8, 2012
- Presenters: Soli Philander & Cathy Specific
- Venue: The Lyric Theatre, Gold Reef City, Johannesburg, South Africa
- Broadcaster: World Wide Mr Gay Official Site
- Entrants: 25
- Placements: 5
- Winner: Andreas Derleth; New Zealand
- Congeniality: Thom Goderie; Netherlands
- Best National Costume: Carlito Floro Rosadino Jr. Philippines
- Photogenic: Gonzalo Enrique Bagaloni; Argentina

Mr Gay World 2012, the 4th Mr Gay World pageant, was held at The Lyric Theatre, in Gold Reef City, Johannesburg, South Africa on April 8, 2012. François Nel of South Africa crowned his successor, Andreas Derleth of New Zealand. 25 countries and territories competed for the title.

== Results ==
Final results	Contestant
Mister Gay World 2012	New Zealand – Andreas Derleth
1st Runner-Up	South Africa – Lance Weyer
2nd Runner-Up	France – Remy Frejaville
3rd Runner-Up	United States – Kevin Scott Power
4th Runner-Up	Netherlands – Thom Goderie
5th Runner-Up	Canada – Thomas Egli

=== Special awards ===
Award	Contestant
Mr. Gay Congeniality	Netherlands – Thom Goderie
Mr. Gay Formal Wear	Netherlands – Thom Goderie
Mr. Gay Photogenic	Argentina – Gonzalo Enrique Bagalon
Best National Costume	Philippines – Carlito Floro Rosadino Jr.
Mr. People's Choice	Philippines – Carlito Floro Rosadino Jr.
Mr. Gay Outreach	Czech Republic – Tomas Fryda
Mr. Sports Challenge	New Zealand – Andreas Derleth
Best Interview Challenge	New Zealand – Andreas Derleth
Mr. Gay Swimwear	New Zealand –Andreas Derleth
Top Score in the MGW Written Exam	South Africa – Lance Weyer

== Judges ==
- Briand Bedford - Editor in Chief -Spartacus International Gay Guide (Germany);
- Eric Butter - President of Mr. Gay World Ltd.(Australia & Republic of El Salvador);
- Andrew Craig - Founding Editor DNA Magazine. (Australia);
- Frank Malaba - Actor/Human Rights Activist/Playwright Poet/Radio Producer/Host. (Zimbabwe);
- Dr. Pubern Padayachee - Indian medical doctor/TV presenter/part-time Bollywood actor. (India & South Africa);
- Remco Teppema - Co-founder/co-publisher of the gay publications Winq and Mate Magazine. (The Netherlands);
- Mr. Terry Tucker - Geoscientist/senior executive. (Canada).

== Contestants ==
Country	Contestant	Age	Height
Argentina	Gonzalo Bagaloni	22	1.73 m (5 ft 8 in)
Australia	Benjamin Michael	29	1.85 m (6 ft 1 in)
Brazil	Heverton Martins	24	1.76 m (5 ft 9 1/2 in)
Bulgaria	Chavdar Arsov	25	1.76 m (5 ft 9 1/2 in)
Canada	Thomas Egli	32	1.76 m (5 ft 9 1/2 in)
Chile	Christopher Romo Terraza	25	1.73 m (5 ft 8 in)
Czech Republic	Tomas Fryda	23	1.78 m (5 ft 10 in)
Ethiopia	Robel Hailu	25	1.71 m (5 ft 7 1/2 in)
Finland	Jussi Laitinen	26	1.69 m (5 ft 6 1/2 in)
France	Remy Frejaville	30	1.78 m (5 ft 10 in)
Germany	Chris J. Janik	35	1.78 m (5 ft 10 in)
Hong Kong	Jimmy Wong	26	1.81 m (5 ft 11 1/2 in)
Ireland	Steven Baitson	21	1.81 m (5 ft 11 1/2 in)
Mexico	Miguel Angel Espinosa	24	1.72 m (5 ft 7 1/2 in)
Namibia	Wendelinus Hamutenya	24	1.71 m (5 ft 7 1/2 in)
Netherlands	Thom Goderie	21	1.73 m (5 ft 8 in)
New Zealand	Andreas Derleth	32	1.90 m (6 ft 3 in)
Norway	Stephen Grindhaug	21	
Philippines	Carlito Floro Rosadino, Jr	27	1.72 m (5 ft 7 1/2 in)
South Africa	Lance Weyer	24	1.75 m (5 ft 9 in)
Spain	Angel Cervera	24	1.81 m (5 ft 11 1/2 in)
Switzerland	Stephan Bitterlin	42	1.76 m (5 ft 9 1/2 in)
United Kingdom	Samuel Mark Kneen	23	1.78 m (5 ft 10 in)
USA	Kevin Scott Power	22	1.79 m (5 ft 10 1/2 in)
Venezuela	Jhon Williams Gonzalez	24	1.82 m (5 ft 11 1/2 in)
