= Wendelinus Hamutenya =

- Citizenship: Namibian
- Occupations: Activist, Personal Financial Consultant
- Known for: First Mr Gay Namibia (2011)

Wendelinus Hamutenya is a Namibian model and gay activist. He was the first-ever Mr Gay Namibia in 2011, In 2012, he became one of the first two Black Africans to compete in the Mr Gay World competition held in Johannesburg.

== Personal life ==
Hamutenya was born in the village of Oshalembe in the Omusati Region of northern Namibia.In November 2020, Hamutenya married Immanuel Jeremiah in a ceremony in South Africa. The couple has since adopted a son. In 2021, Hamutenya's boyfriend was arrested for the attempted murder of Hamutenya. Hamutenya said his boyfriend stabbed him after he bought an older version of a Samsung Galaxy mobile phone that his boyfriend did not want.

== Early activism ==
Shortly after his 2011 win, Hamutenya was physically attacked near his home by individuals seeking his prize money. In late 2012, he was stripped of his title by pageant organizers following a domestic dispute in South Africa; however, Hamutenya maintained that the charges were later withdrawn and that he remained a leader in the community.

In 2015, Hamutenya was mugged and beaten; LGBTQ groups in Namibia say the attack may have been politically motivated due to his LGBTQ rights activism.

In 2023, following the Namibian Supreme Court recognising foreign same-sex marriages in the country, Hamutenya said that "the Supreme Court of Namibia has ruled in favour of gay people". Later that year, traditional leaders of the Herero people criticised Hamutenya over outfits he wore at an anti-homophobia demonstration in Windhoek, saying "What is utterly disturbing is that this 'man', who chose to use our dress inappropriately, does not even appear to be a Herero, making me wonder why he chose our dress and not the one from his tribe", and that "the Herero Traditional Dress ... is linked to a culture that has very deep roots in the Herero nation. It is completely inappropriate and distasteful for a 'man' to wear it as it is reserved for women and it is initially introduced to young women through a specific ritual."
