= Mr Gay World 2009 =

Gay pageant in Canada

- Date: February 8, 2009
- Presenters: Mark Tewksbury
- Venue: Whistler, Canada
- Broadcaster: World Wide Mr Gay Official Site
- Entrants: 19
- Placements: 10
- Debuts: Argentina; Australia; Austria; Brazil; Bulgaria; Canada; Chile; Colombia; Ireland; Lithuania; Mexico; New Zealand; Northern Ireland; Norway; Paraguay; Philippines; South Africa; Spain; Venezuela
- Withdrawals: Czech Republic; Gran Canaria; India; KwaZulu-Natal; United States
- Winner: Max Krzyzanowski; Ireland
- Congeniality: Francisco Javier Ortega; Colombia
- Best National Costume: Wilbert Ting Tolentino; Philippines
- Photogenic: Victor Marcelo Benitez; Argentina

Mr Gay World 2009, the 1st Mr Gay World pageant, was held in Whistler, Canada on February 8, 2009. Max Krzyzanowski of Ireland was crowned Mr Gay World 2009. 19 countries and territories competed for the first time for the title.

== Results ==
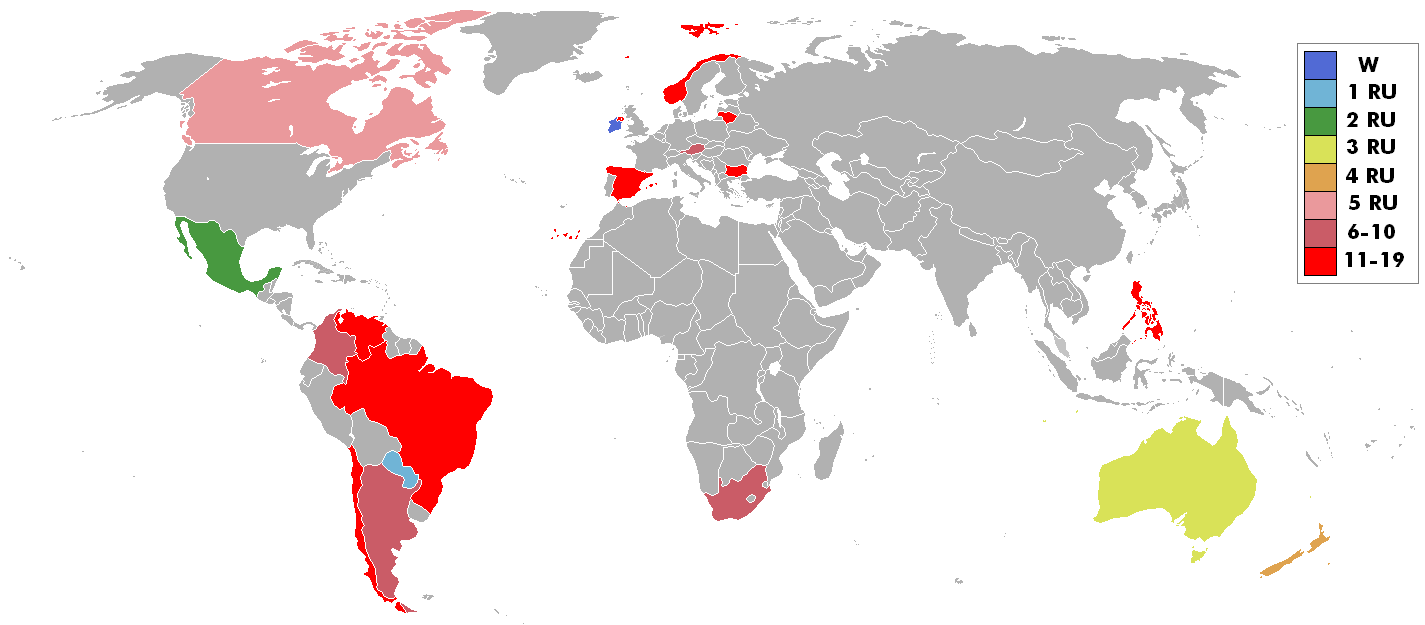
Countries which sent delegates and results.

Final results	Contestant
Mister Gay World 2009	Ireland – Max Krzyzanowski
1st Runner-Up	Paraguay – Alexis Cespedes
2nd Runner-Up	Mexico – Pico Velasco Michel
3rd Runner-Up	Australia – Ben Edwards
4th Runner-Up	New Zealand – Reece Karena
5th Runner-Up	Canada – Darren Bruce
Top 10	Argentina – Victor Marcelo Benitez; Austria – Michael Fröhle; Colombia – Francisco Javier Ortega; South Africa – Deon Strydom

Special Awards:

Award	Contestant
Mr. Gay Photogenic	Argentina – Victor Marcelo Benitez
Mr. Gay Congeniality	Colombia – Francisco Javier Ortega
Mr. Gay Leadership	Australia – Ben Edwards
Best National Costume	Philippines – Wilbert Ting Tolentino
Mr. Gay Popularity	Philippines – Wilbert Ting Tolentino
Best in Swimwear	Paraguay – Alexis Cespedes

== Contestants ==
- Argentina - Victor Marcelo Benitez
- Australia - Ben Edwards
- Austria - Michael Fröhle
- Brazil - Edson Lopes
- Bulgaria - Deyan Kolev
- Canada - Darren Bruce
- Chile - Roberto Andres Alvarez Alvarado
- Colombia - Francisco Javier Ortega
- Ireland - Max Krzyzanowski
- Lithuania - Arturas Vipas Burnickis
- Mexico - Pico Velasco Michel
- New Zealand - Reece Karena
- Northern Ireland - James Ciaran Smallman
- Norway - Kai Thomas Ryen Larsen
- Paraguay - Alexis Cespedes
- Philippines - Wilbert Ting Tolentino
- South Africa - Deon Strydom
- Spain - Antonio Pedro Almijez
- Venezuela - Juan Jose Bracho

=== Did not attend ===
- Czech Republic - Jakub Starý
- Canary Islands - Dempsey Saeedian
- India - Bhavin Shivji Gala
- KwaZulu-Natal - Andrew Venter
- USA - Doug Edward Repetti

== Contestants notes ==
- Antonio Pedro Almijez (Spain) was Mr Gay Europe 2008.
- Michael Fröhle (Austria), Deyan Kolev (Bulgaria), Arturas Vipas Burnickis (Lithuania), Kai Thomas Ryen Larsen (Norway) competed in Mr Gay Europe 2008.
- Juan Jose Bracho (Venezuela) competed in International Mr. Gay 2008 and placed 1st Runner-up. Francisco Javier Ortega (Colombia) and Deon Strydom (South Africa) competed in International Mr. Gay 2009.
