= Mr. Gay International =

Gay male beauty contest

Mister Gay International
- Formation: 2005
- Type: Beauty Pageant
- Headquarters: Canada
- Members: 40+
- Official language: English
- President: Don Spradlin (President and Director Oceania)

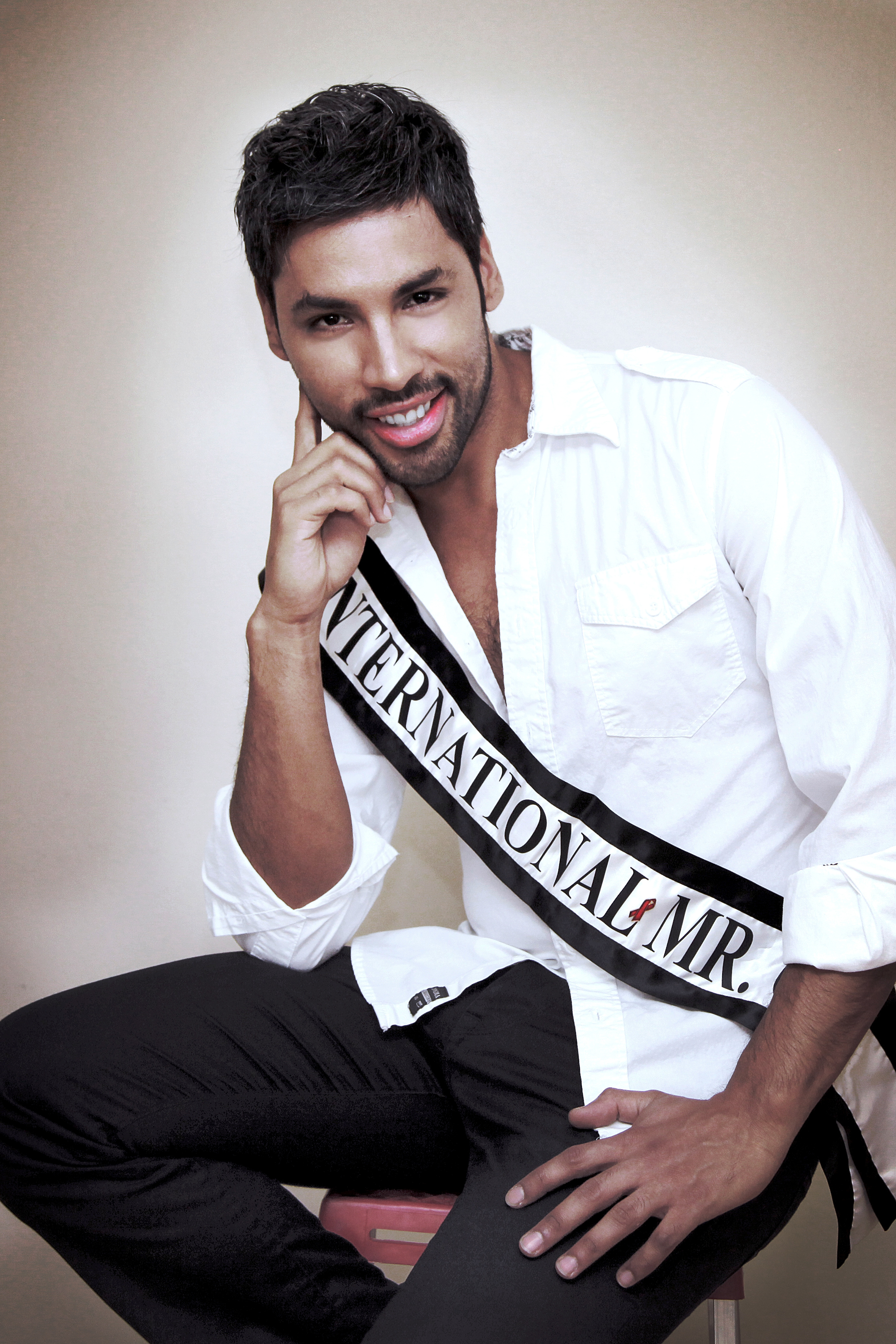
Pablo Salvador International Mr. Gay Titleholder.

Mr. Gay International was the first international contest to select an Ambassador or spokesman to support the mission of the sponsoring nonprofit corporation, the Noble Beast Foundation. President of the Noble Beast Foundation is Don Spradlin, who founded and produced the first three Competitions with a team of dedicated volunteers. Carlos Melia, native from Argentina was the third International Mr Gay titleholder, elected and crowned in Los Angeles, California in 2008. The last International Mr. Gay titleholder was Pablo Salvador Sepúlveda from Chile. The competition has been de facto replaced by Mr Gay World.

== Mission statement ==
"(To) advocate International Equal Rights by confirming the essential nature and contributions of gay men to a healthy society where "gay" is not a stereotype"

== Media Coverage ==
The event explicitly seeks to highlight discrimination against LGBTI people and provide select positive role models. A number of contestants from a number of countries has faced sanctions for their selection or competition, including Zoltan Parag from India, Taurai Zhanje from Zimbabwe, Robel Hailu from Ethiopia, former Olympian Chavdar Arsov from Bulgaria, Wendelinus Hamutenya from Namibia and Xiao Dai from China.

== Titleholders ==
=== List of Mr Gay International titleholders ===
Year	Country/Territory	Mr. Gay International	National title	Location	Ref
2011- 2012	Chile	Pablo Salvador Sepúlveda	Mr. Gay Chile	online competition	
2009-2010	Switzerland	Ricco Müller	Mr. Gay Switzerland International	online competition	
2008	Argentina	Carlos Melia	Mr. Gay Argentina	Los Angeles, California	
2006-2007	Israel	Nathan Shaked	Mr. Gay Israel	Palm Springs, California	
2005	United States	Jesse Bashem	Mr. Gay United States	San Francisco, California	

== Mr Gay International competition ==
The third edition of International Mr Gay International took place in Los Angeles, California. Carlos Melia was crowned as IMG 2008, representing his country of origin as Mr Gay Argentina. As the title holder, Carlos worked as an ambassador and spokesperson for equal and human rights, fundraising and endorsing LGBT organizations and events worldwide. In 2009, Melia joined the board of directors of Mr Gay World, and appointed executive director of Central and South America and the Caribbean.

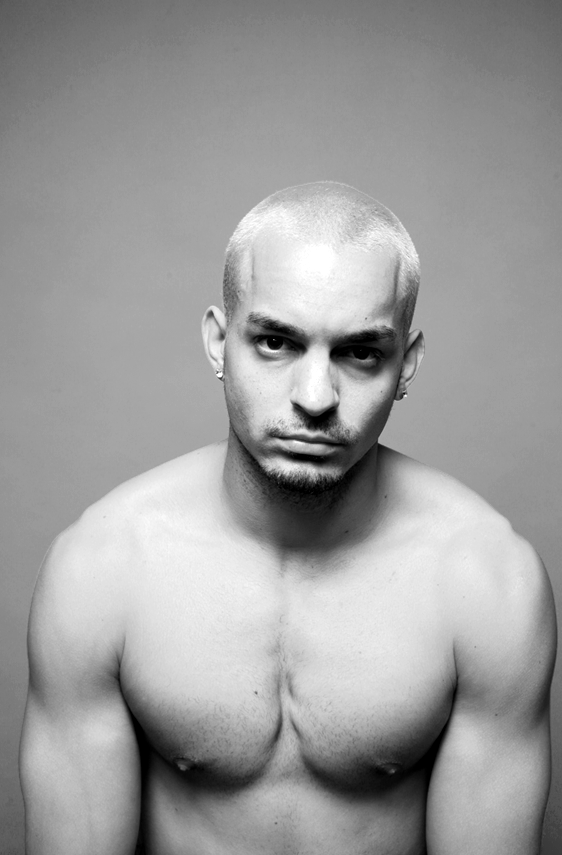
Ricco Müller

The next U.S. finale was held in San Francisco's Museum of Performance and Design in November 2008 when Michael Jarvis was named the U.S. delegate to the IMG. The International Competition was assigned to the Philippines producers for May 2009 in preparation for the first time the IMG Competition would be produced outside of the United States.

The international competition was scheduled for Manila in the Philippines for the summer of 2009, but it encountered production issues that resulted in the competition returning to California.

The 2009 - 2010 Mr. Gay International titleholder was Switzerland's Ricco Müller. Rounding up the top five were Australia as first runner-up, USA as second runner-up, Philippines as third runner-up, and Puerto Rico as fourth runner-up. As International Mr. Gay, Müller supports AIDS-related campaigns and deaf communities.

In January 2011, Pablo Salvador Sepúlveda, activist and history teacher, competed in the International Mr Gay Competition and won the title. As International Mr. Gay, he works for the LGBTIQ+ community and supports the first Chilean campaign against bullying at schools. He has appeared on radio and television stations in Chile as an activist and spokesman.

== See also ==
- Mr Gay World
