= Wilbert Tolentino =

Filipino businessman

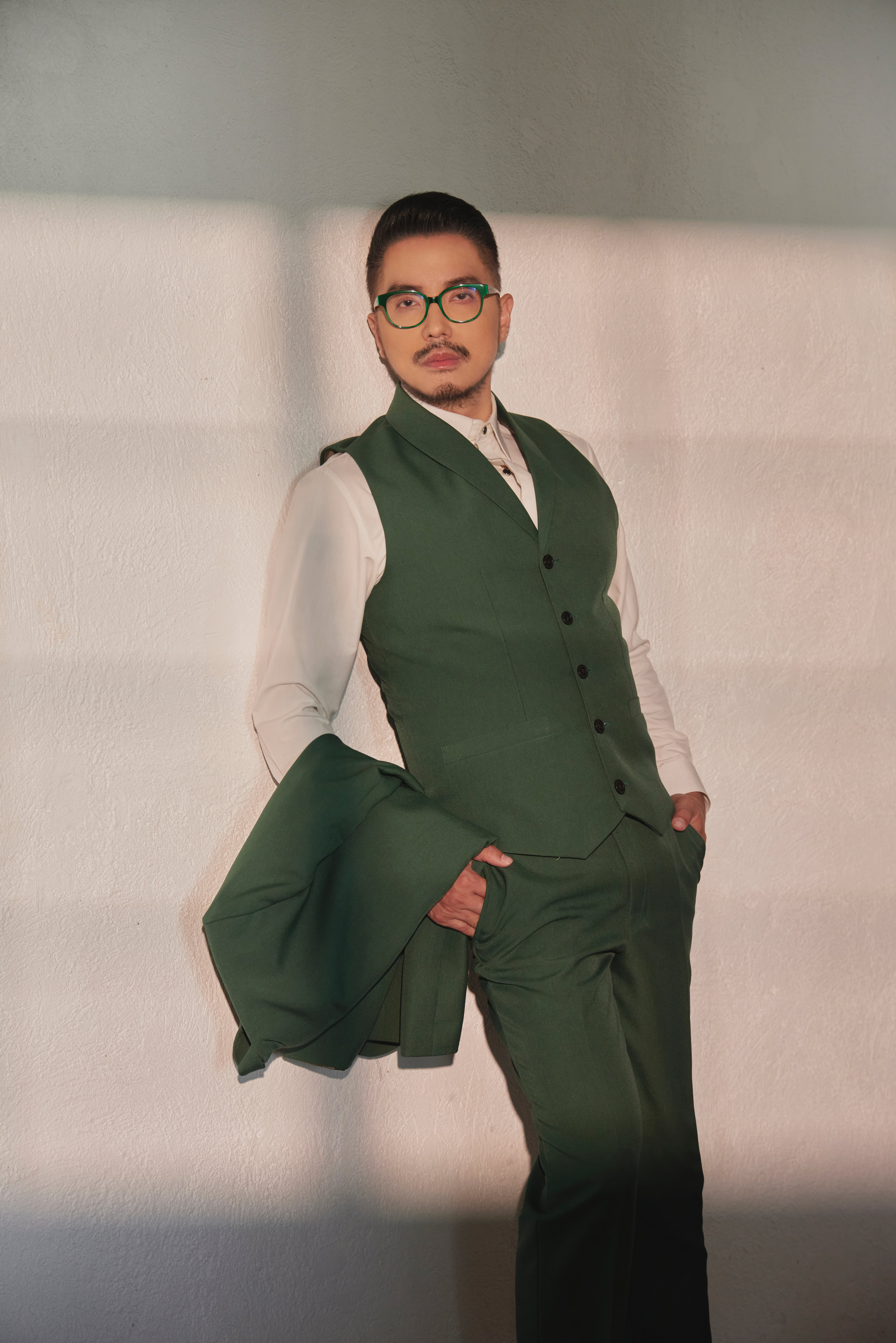
- Born: Wilbert Ting Tolentino; May 18, 1975 (age 51); Manila, Philippines
- Occupations: Businessman; pageant titleholder; philanthropist; vlogger
- Known for: Mr. Gay World Philippines, Youtube Vlogger, entrepreneur
- Notable work: Mr. Gay World Philippines
- Children: 2

Wilbert Ting Tolentino (born May 18, 1975) is a Filipino entrepreneur, restaurateur, philanthropist and a vlogger.

Tolentino is running as the first nominee of Ahon Mahirap Partylist in May 2025 national elections.

== Personal life and career ==
Wilbert Ting Tolentino was born in Binondo, Manila with Chinese-Filipino parents. Tolentino studied at Lorenzo Ruiz Academy in Manila's Chinatown center and continued his college years at University of Santo Tomas for few units.

In My Puhunan: Kaya Mo!, Tolentino revealed to Karen Davila that he ventured into different businesses. As restaurateur, he opened in January 2023 a Japanese restaurant at Quezon City led by a chef from Japan, Sebastian See.

=== Tolentino in popular culture ===
==== Biographical films / TV series ====
- Portrayed by Paolo Contis, as lead actor in the 2024 anthology series A Son's Karma (The Wilbert Tolentino Story), Episode 30, aired on August 3, 2024. It is directed by Richard Arellano and written by Benjamin Benson Logronio and Senedy Que, with supporting cast Mel Tiangco, Anna Marin, William Lorenzo, Ashley Rivera, Aidan Veneracion and Lotlot Bustamante.

== Political Life ==
Tolentino is the first nominee of the Ahon Mahirap Partylist and has used his platform to champion small businesses and advocate for various social causes. Ahon Mahirap Partylist’s mission is to uplift the lives of Filipinos and centers around the following initiatives: financial literacy in elementary schools, social justice and access to all government services, and economic empowerment for micro, small and medium enterprises.

Ahon Mahirap Partylist focuses on removing the age limit for job applications, stressing on no age or gender restrictions; Tolentino, as a Social Media Influencer himself, uses his platform to video document all the projects as the group believes in transparency.

The partylist aims to bring direct, actionable policies that make a tangible difference in the lives of Filipinos.

• Social Justice: Advocating for equal access to resources, the party’s policies include expanding social safety nets and providing targeted support for marginalized groups such as women, youth, seniors, PWD and the LGBTQ+ community.

• Financial Literacy: Ahon Mahirap Partylist plans to launch education initiatives to help communities gain control over their finances, fostering greater independence.

• Economic Empowerment: Through support for small and medium enterprises (SMEs), as well as pushing for investment in infrastructure, the party aims to create jobs and build sustainable growth.

== Social media ==
=== Facebook online challenges ===
Because of the worldwide COVID-19 coronavirus pandemic, Tolentino started multiple online benefit competitions starting in March 2020 for "drag queens, gay contestants, male contestants, social media influencers, entertainment and pageant media, pet owners community and singer-songwriters" to raise funds for the contestants and their families who had lost income.

=== COVID-19 ===
On July 24, 2020, Tolentino experienced mild symptoms of sore eyes. Eventually it became severe and on August 2, he was hospitalized for testing positive and having symptoms of Covid Pneumonia in critical severe state with Acute Respiratory Distress Syndrome. He had a survival chances of 20% and was intubated in CCU at St. Luke's Hospital in Quezon City.

=== Youtuber ===
In October 2020, Tolentino started publishing a vlog on YouTube.

== Talent manager ==
=== Madam Inutz ===
In April, 2021, Daisy Cabantog aka Madam Inutz signed a management contract with Wilbert Tolentino.

Madam Inutz is a viral sensation online seller during pandemic that made her famous. She recorded four singles: Inutil, Sangkap ng Pasko, Madam and Marites.

Tolentino entered Inutz to Pinoy Big Brother Kumunity Season 10 and finished fourth.

=== Herlene Budol ===
In February 2022, Herlene Budol signed a management contract with Tolentino.

Under Tolentino's management, Herlene Budol joined Binibing Pilipinas 2022 and finished 1st Runner Up. Budol bagged (8) eight special awards: Bb. Pizza Hut, Bb. Shein, Bb. Silka, Jag Jeans Denim Quenn, Bb. World Balance, Manila Bulletin Choice Award, Bb. Kumu, Bb. Black Water.

After the pageant, Budol signed various endorsement deals, TV appearances, and recording labels.

Tolentino has produced a single "Gandang Hipon" which means Beautiful Shrimp in English, under Kafreshness Records.

Budol became a lead role in a TV Mini series called "Magandang Dilag" on GMA Network.

Tolentino also entered Budol to Miss Planet International in Kampala, Uganda. However, the pageant was postponed and Budol withdrew. Instead Tolentino entered Budol to Miss Grand Philippines a year after and won Miss Philippines Tourism. Budol bagged 5 awards: Best in Runway, Miss Ever Bilena, Miss Arena Plus, Miss Mermaid Manila Hair, Miss Blue Water Day Spa.

In July 2023, Tolentino terminated his management contract with Budol for health reasons and devote ample time to his child and family.
