= Mr Gay World =

International pageant competition for gay men

- Type: Beauty pageant
- First edition: 2009
- Most recent edition: 2025
- Current titleholder: Julio Spatola; Italy
- Founder: Eric Butter
- Owner: Julius Dalisay ( DBA) Wayne Renzo
- Language: English
- Website: http://www.mrgayworld.com/

Mr. Gay World is an annual international beauty pageant competition for gay men, established in 2009. On September 4, 2024, Wayne Renzo from the Philippines acquired the Mr. Gay World Organization.

== Media coverage ==
The event explicitly seeks to highlight discrimination against LGBTQ+ people and provide select positive role models. A number of contestants from a number of countries has faced sanctions for their selection or competition, including Nolan Lewis from India, Taurai Zhanje from Zimbabwe, Robel Hailu from Ethiopia, former Olympian Chavdar Arsov from Bulgaria, Wendelinus Hamutenya from Namibia and Xiao Dai from China. Contestants in Mr. Gay Syria were only able to compete after leaving the country and sought refugee status in Canada.

Mr Gay World seeks to establish ambassadors for LGBTQ+ and human rights, with winners of national contests competing as delegates in a variety of categories. In 2021, the pageant amended its policy to encompass the male-identifying spectrum within the LGBTQ+ community.

== Controversy ==
In 2014, Mr Gay New Zealand, Mr Gay Australia and a sponsoring skincare company all pulled out of the competition claiming 'bullying, poor living conditions, and inappropriate pressure to hook up with other contestants'. Mr Gay World replied claiming that the two contestants had been removed for alcohol abuse and rule breaking.

In 2015, the winner of the competition, Mr Gay Germany Klaus Burkart, stepped down seven months later citing “personal changes,” and was replaced by Mr Gay Hong Kong.

In 2018, Mr Gay World announced that the 2019 competition will move to South Africa from Hong Kong due to prohibition from local authorities.

In November 2021, Mr. Gay World South Africa 2021 Louw Breytenbach resigned; the title was given to South African Runner-up Bonginkosi Ndima, who then resigned in March 2022, and then Mr. Gay World Philippines 2021 Joel Rey Carcasona took over the title Mr. Gay World 2021.

== Titleholders ==
Edition	Year	Date	Mr Gay World	Runner-up					Location	Entrants	Ref.
Edition	Year	Date	Mr Gay World	First	Second	Third	Fourth	Fifth	Location	Entrants	Ref.
1	2009	February 13, 2009	Max Krzyzanowski; Ireland	Alexis Cespedes; Paraguay	Pico Velasco Michel; Mexico	Ben Edwards; Australia	Reece Karena; New Zealand	Darren Bruce; Canada	Whistler, Canada	19	
2	2010	February 13, 2010	Charl van den Berg; South Africa	Samuel Adu; Australia	Rick Dean Twombley; Hong Kong	Xindai Muyi; China	Sergio Lara; Spain	Not awarded	Oslo, Norway	23	
3	2011	March 13, 2011	Francois Nel; South Africa	Michael Kevin Holtz; United States	Israel Acevedo; Spain	Leigh Charles; Australia	Aaron Comis; New Zealand	Not awarded	Mandaluyong, Philippines	23	
4	2012	April 8, 2012	Andreas Derleth; New Zealand	Lance Weyer; South Africa	Remy Frejaville; France	Kevin Scott Power; United States	Thom Goderie; Netherlands	Not awarded	Johannesburg, South Africa	22	
5	2013	August 5, 2013	Christopher Michael Olwage; New Zealand	Benjie Vasquez Caraig; Hong Kong	Matthew Simmons; United States	Not awarded			Antwerp, Belgium	25	
6	2014	August 31, 2014	Stuart Hatton Jr; United Kingdom	Kiriakos Spanos; Cyprus	Robbie Lawlor; Ireland	Luis Vento; Venezuela	Bridge Hudson; Hong Kong	Not awarded	Rome, Italy	23	
7	2015	May 3, 2015	Klaus Burkart; Germany (Resigned)	Mass Luciano; Hong Kong (Assumed)	Tomi Lappi; Finland	Not awarded			Cape Town, South Africa	21	
8	2016	April 23, 2016	Roger Gosalbez; Spain	Chris Krauel; Austria	Christian Lacsamana; Philippines	Kyle Patrick; Sint Maarten	Rafael Fagundes; Brazil	Not awarded	Valletta, Malta	24	
9	2017	May 10, 2017	John Raspado; Philippines	Cándido Arteaga; Spain	Raf Van Puymbroeck; Belgium	Marco Tornese; Switzerland	Alexander Steyn; South Africa	Not awarded	Maspalomas, Spain	21	
10	2018	May 26, 2018	Jordan Paul Bruno; Australia	Ricky Devine-White; New Zealand	Samarpan Maiti; India	Po-Hung Chen; Taiwan	João de Oliveira; Portugal	Not awarded	Knysna, South Africa	21	
11	2019	May 4, 2019	Janjep Carlos; Philippines (Completed)	Fran Alvarado; Spain (Assumed)	Oliver Pusztai; Hungary	Chayodhom Samibat; Thailand	Nick Van Vooren; Belgium	Not awarded	Cape Town, South Africa	22	
12	2020	May 3, 2020	Kodie Macayan; Philippines	Marek Piekarczyk; Poland	Vicente Miron; Mexico	Not awarded			Virtual contest (Cape Town, South Africa)	9	
13	2021	October 30, 2021	Louw Breytenbach; South Africa (Resigned)	Joel Carcasona; Philippines (Assumed)	Joshuan Aponte; Puerto Rico	Not awarded			Virtual contest (Cape Town, South Africa)	10	
14	2022	October 16, 2022	José López Duvónt; Puerto Rico	Tony Ardolino; United States	Max Appenroth; Germany	Not awarded			Cape Town, South Africa	8	
15	2023	October 27, 2023	Troy Michael Smith; Guam	David Allwood; Great Britain	Dion Alexander; Australia	Not awarded			Cape Town, South Africa	11	
16	2024	August 26, 2024	Paul Carruthers; Great Britain	John Bench Ortiz; Philippines	Poosit Changkaewmanee; Thailand	Not awarded			Northumberland, United Kingdom	11	
Edition	Year	Date	Mr Gay World	Mr Gay World Intercontinental	Mr Gay World Tourism	Runner-up		Location	Entrants	Ref.	
Edition	Year	Date	Mr Gay World	Mr Gay World Intercontinental	Mr Gay World Tourism	First	Second	Location	Entrants	Ref.	
17	2025	December 1, 2025	Giulio Spatola; Italy	Tim Kusters; Netherlands	Gert Claassen-Smit; South Africa	Paul Dennison; Great Britain	Daisuke Kawarada; Japan	Quezon City, Philippines	12		

=== Country/territory by number of wins ===
The 2020 finale was held alongside the 2021 finale, creating an Epic Finale in which two winners were crowned.

Country/Territory	Titles	Year
Philippines	4	2017, 2019, 2020, 2021 (Note: Originally crowned 1st Runner-Up. Took over the title after the original winner resigned.)
South Africa	3	2010, 2011, 2021 (Note: Resigned)
Spain	2	2016, 2019 (Note: Originally crowned 1st Runner-Up. Took over the title after the original winner completed his reign.)
New Zealand	2	2012, 2013
Italy	1	2025
Great Britain	1	2024
Guam	1	2023
Puerto Rico	1	2022
Australia	1	2018
Germany	1	2015
Hong Kong	1	2015
United Kingdom	1	2014
Ireland	1	2009

== See also ==
- International Mr Gay Competition
- International Mr. Leather
