= Nazaqat =

2013 novel by Harsh Agarwal

- First edition
- Author: Sasha H. Singhal
- Language: Indian English
- Genre: Thriller, Drama
- Set in: India
- Publisher: Half Baked Beans
- Publication date: 2013
- Publication place: India
- Pages: 204
- ISBN: 8192-692-620

Nazaqat is a novel written by author Harsh Agarwal. Nazaqat was published in 2013 by Half Baked Beans under the pen name of Sasha H Singhal.

== Plot ==
The story of Nazaqat is about a girl Naazani, who gets into sex work and takes the name Nazaqat. She eventually fought to legalize prostitution in India.

== Reception ==
Sankalpita Singh at Metro India said, "The book is written beautifully with the characters, the drama, the action woven so intricately yet so vividly. Though the book is very good, there is definitely scope of improvement in terms of plot." Lucknow Tribune published, "The book attempts to make a rather powerful statement on women empowerment through the life of a high-end escort Nazaqat."

== The author ==
Harsh Agarwal is an author whose other books include An Excursion of Insight and Life in a Nutshell. He is also credited for films Mind Mera Mind, and Vaidya.
