= Anwesh Sahoo =

Indian artist, blogger

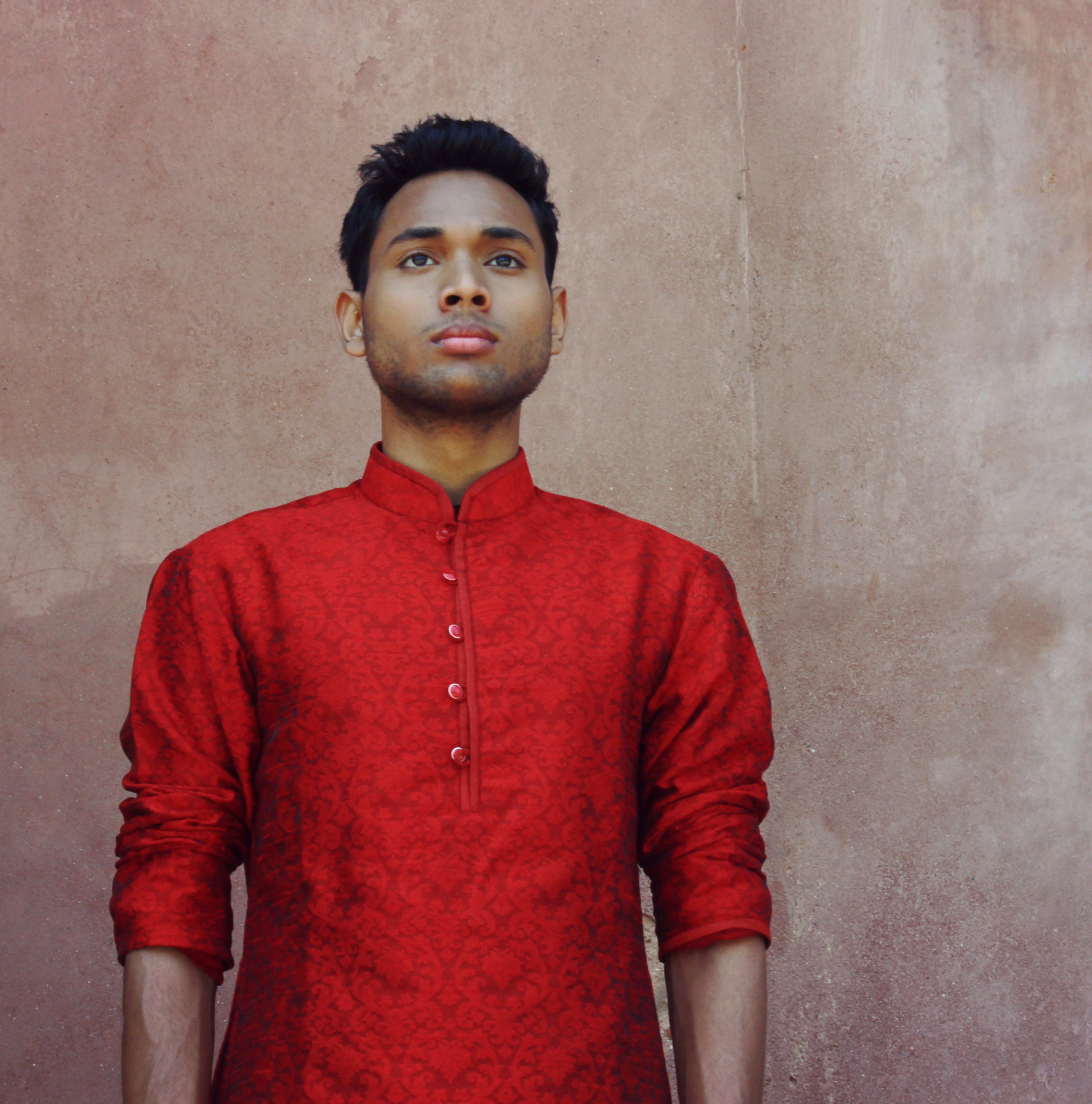
- Born: 4 July 1995 (age 31); Bhubaneswar, Odisha, India
- Education: IIIT Delhi NIFT University College Cork
- Occupations: Artist; Writer; Model; TEDxSpeaker; Blogger
- Years active: 2016–present
- Height: 1.73 m (5 ft 8 in)

Anwesh Kumar Sahoo (born 4 July 1995) is an Indian artist, blogger, writer, model, actor and a TEDx speaker. He was crowned Mr. Gay World India 2016, becoming the youngest winner of the crown at the age of 20. He represented India at the Mr. Gay World 2016 pageant held in Malta, Europe and made it to the Top 12. He is a recipient of the Troy Perry Award for compassionate activism, making him the first Indian to be honored with the award. He's a graduate in Electronics and Communication Engineering from IIIT Delhi, and holds a double master's degree, first earning a Master of Design from NIFT, New Delhi in 2020, followed by a Master of Science from University College Cork, Ireland in 2024. Anwesh went on to work for Aristocrat Gaming, an Australian MNC, as a Technical Artist.

== Early life and education ==
Anwesh was born in Bhubaneswar, Odisha on 4 July 1995 to Jagannath Sahoo, an Engineer with NTPC, and Kanak Sahoo, a homemaker. Anwesh grew up in a small township of Kaniha in Odisha. At age 13, he and his parents moved to Noida, Uttar Pradesh. He completed his schooling at Vishwa Bharati Public School in Noida, and has mentioned of multiple instances of bullying throughout his school life in his interviews and blog posts.

In an interview with Gaylaxy Magazine, he said how he had a very good childhood until he started middle school and the bullying intensified. He said his only escape was his books and the dream of acing his 12th boards. He went on to score 95% in his Higher Secondary Exams. He also secured an All India Rank of 15 in the National Institute of Fashion Technology's exam in 2018, and is a student of M.Des at NIFT, New Delhi.

He came out as gay to his sister at the age of 16, and by the age of 18 had started writing a blog 'The Effeminare', to combat homophobia in his own little way and create awareness related to LGBTIQ issues in India. He wrote an article called Under the Lucky Star for Pink-Pages, a National LGBT Magazine in India, where he came out to the readers and later on, also to his parents through the article. In his article he writes, "There is an underlying sense of security that only the walls of the closet can ensure. But then follows the phase of suffocation. The walls that once protected us begin to make us feel restricted. And what follows is the "end of self denial". This is when it all gets better." He went on to write another article the following year for Pink-Pages called 'Growing Up Gay', where he spoke of how contrary to the reactions of people, growing up gay in India isn't half as bad. He continued to write for online forums that same year.

== Career ==
Sahoo was a 3rd year engineering student at IIIT Delhi, when he was crowned Mr. Gay World India, and at 20 was the youngest contestant at the World pageant. His campaign Fitting Out gained widespread acclaim that year, garnering the highest marks at the World pageant. He was featured by Deutsche Welle, Germany's public international broadcaster where he spoke about coming out in a nation where indulging in homosexual acts could land you in jail.

Post winning Mr. Gay World India, he became a part of the 50 Shades of Gay campaign shot by Shubham Mehrotra and was featured on the Gay Star News that year. He became the first former contributor of Pink Pages to feature on the cover of the magazine in its June 2016 issue. Anwesh later gained mainstream visibility due to a video he shot with Gaysi called Silly Questions Straight People Ask Gay Men that went viral over the Internet and was subsequently featured on numerous Indian and International websites including BuzzFeed India, Cosmopolitan India, Vagabomb and Logo TV's NEWNOWNEXT. Another video featuring him belly dancing to a popular Bollywood number 'My Name is Lakhan' went viral later that year in December, with popular websites and news outlets featuring him including Indian Express, Storypick, Queerty and Vagabomb.

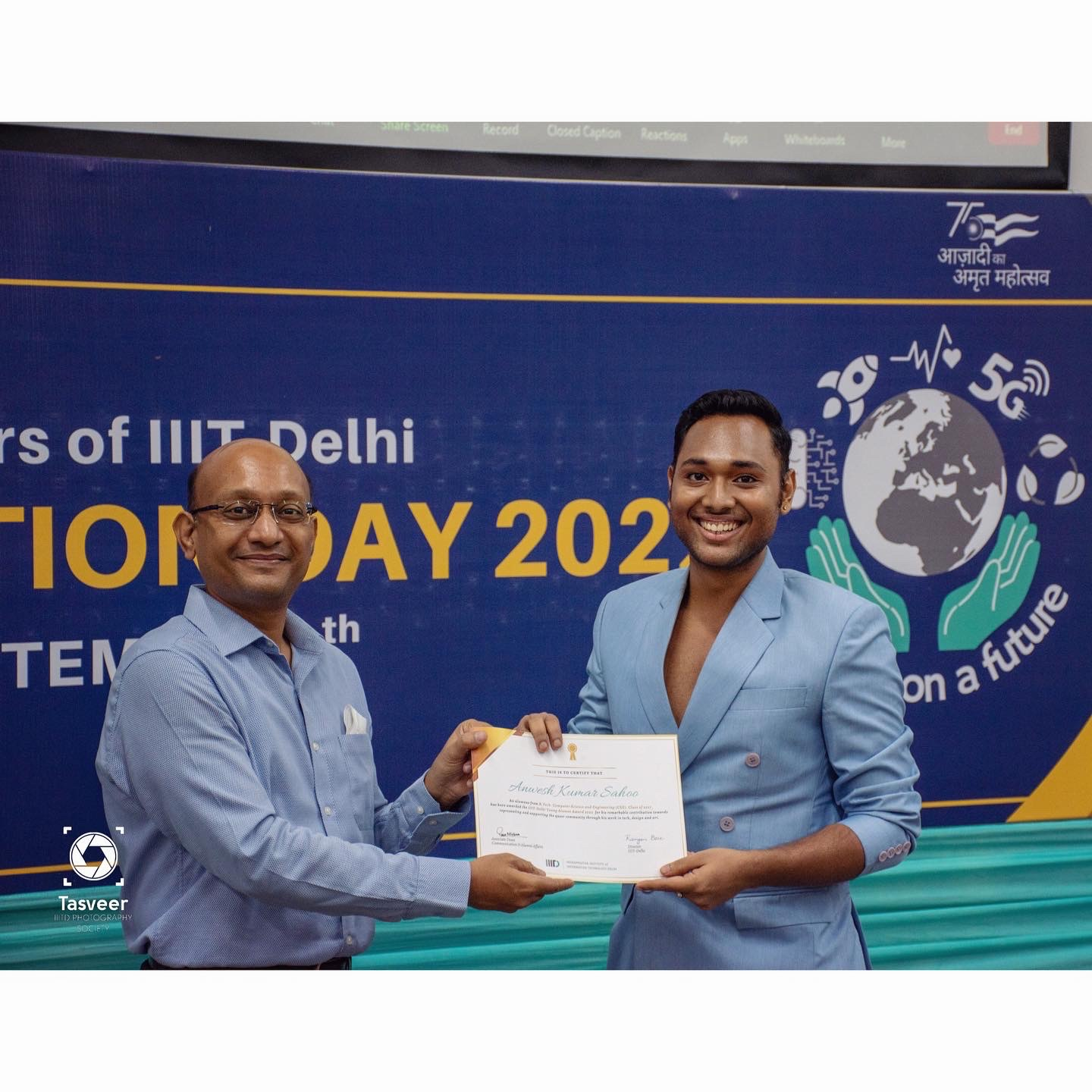
Anwesh Sahoo received the Young Alumni Award at IIIT Delhi in 2022 for his remarkable contribution to representing and supporting the queer community through his work in Tech, Art, and Design.

He also works as a writer for Swaddle, a parenting website where he writes on sexuality and gender related issues for parents. Some of his notable works on the site include, "What do you do if you think your child is Gay?", and "Gender and Sexuality Terms: A Sensitive Glossary for Parents". Anwesh has also written of his experience of being bullied online post winning the crown of Mr. Gay India, where he was criticized for not being 'pretty enough' and being 'too dark' to represent India on his blog The Effeminare, which was later published on Gaylaxy Magazine and covered by Pinksixty News. He also organized Delhi University's first pride walk in association with IIT Delhi's Annual fest Rendezvous to create awareness and promote acceptance for the LGBTIQ community. Anwesh has also been photographed by British photographer Olivia Arthur for a photo-series exploring sexuality in Mumbai, India which were later exhibited at the FOCUS Photography Festival, 2017 at Elysium Mansion, Colaba. Anwesh was named as one of the emerging LGBT Role Models of 2016 by Indian Women Blog, alongside transgender rights activist Laxmi Narayan Tripathi, and Business Analyst Himanshu Singh. He was the ambassador for 'Dance4Pride' event organized by Delhi-based organization Those in Need in association with Scruff in April 2017. He has featured in a social media campaign for Delhi-based brand Poem bags. Anwesh has been a contributor for DNA, India with his article called "The Problem with Stereotypes" which was published on 23 May 2017. He shared his coming out story in the article writing, "The problem with stereotypes isn't that they're wrong, it's that they are incomplete." Sahoo made an appearance in National Geographic Channel's Explorer Season 10, Episode 12 (uncredited), that released on 22 May 2017. On October 6, 2018, Anwesh was awarded the Troy Perry Award for compassionate activism, in Los Angeles, California, making him the first Indian to be a recipient of this honor. He has been listed in Times India's list of 11 most inspiring LGBTIQA+ Indians with the likes of Vikram Seth and Keshav Suri, and in 2020 was featured in Vogue India in the list of 5 queer Indian influencers you should be following on Instagram.

=== Acting Experience ===
Anwesh began his acting career with an ad film in 2017 with Kraftly alongside Nargis Nandal (from Gulamohar fame). He followed this with another ad film for Indian dessert chain 'Frozen Bottle'. In 2022 Anwesh won a major ad campaign for Absolut Glassware alongside Indian supermodel Anjali Lama, Olympian Dutee Chand, and drag artist Durga Gawde, that focused on sharing ways to be a strong ally to the LGBTQ+ community. Anwesh has also modelled for British photographer Olivia Arthur for Magnum Photos.

=== Notable Artworks ===
Anwesh began illustrating at the age of 4, and later went on to pursue art professionally as a Visual Designer and Digital Illustrator. Some of his notable works include an inclusive 'Deck of Cards' for Disney, wallpapers for WhatsApp, digital posters for Google and Netflix, cover art for Queersapien by Rupa Publications, for ‘Queers in Quarantine’ by Norway-based Mohini Books and later for 'The Garden Tantra' by Oslo-based author Vikram Kolmannskog.

Sahoo is also a contributing author to the "Queer Compassion in 15 Comics" comic book edited by Andrew Thomas, Megan Aston, and Phillip Joy, where he wrote and illustrated the comic "Effeminared: Under the Lucky Star", further showcasing his talent and commitment to queer representation and storytelling. Furthermore, he designed the film poster for the documentary film Amma's Pride, directed by Shiva Krish, which premiered at the Krakow Film Festival in Poland in May 2024.

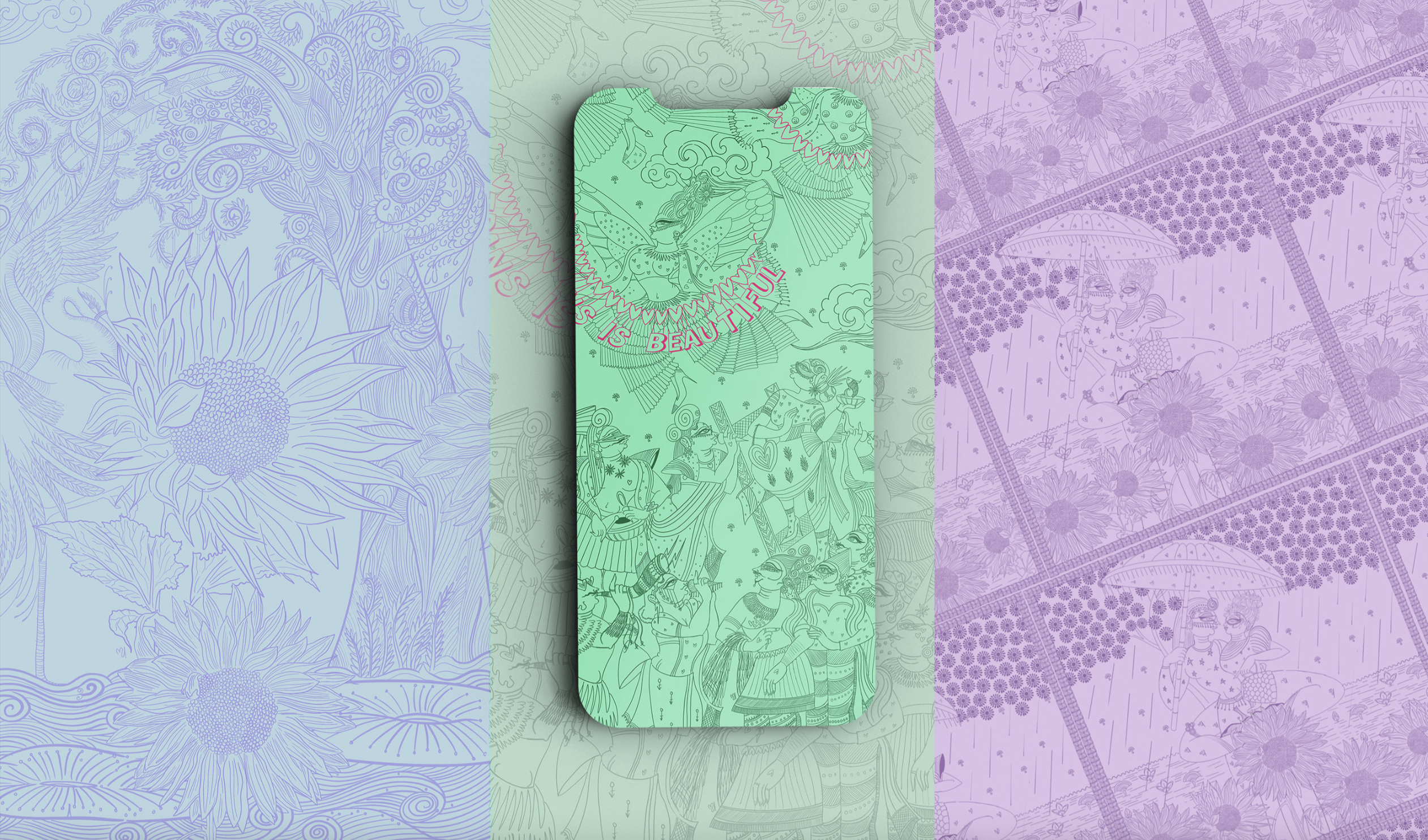
Pride Reimagined, Umbrella and The Watering Can, Resilience | Artworks by Anwesh for WhatsApp

==== Wallpapers for WhatsApp ====
All illustrations in the entire series re-imagine the Universe of Effeminare and patachitra (an old Odiya traditional art form) and amalgamates it with maximalism and over the top, opulent fashion references. Anwesh used elements from the nature, especially Chilika lake (where he would visit during his summer holidays). He also aimed at initiating a conversation around safe and hygienic sex practices (the purple illustration in the series is called, 'Umbrella and The Watering Can').

==== Artworks for Google ====
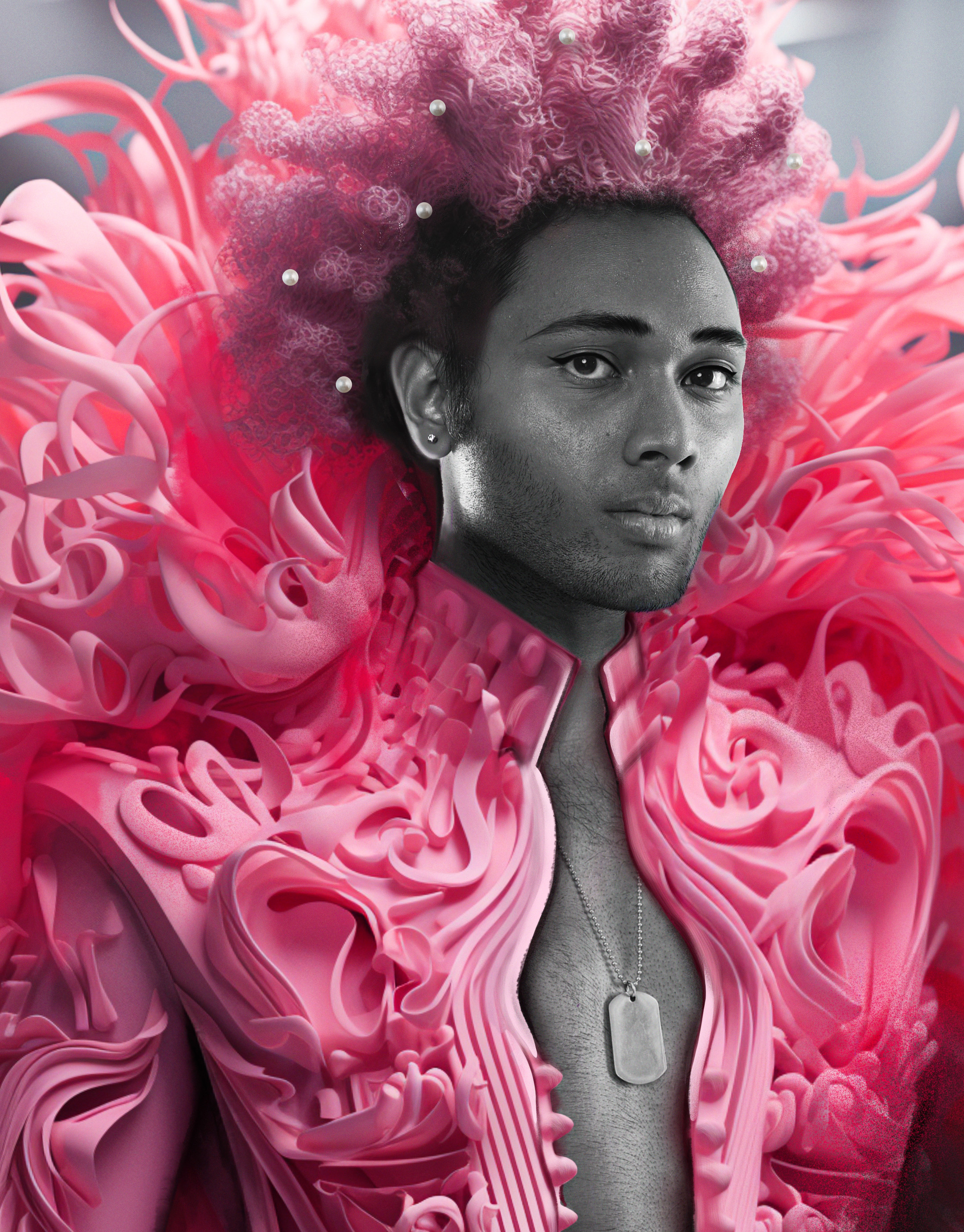
Anwesh's cyber-fashion artwork as part of his Melanin Everyday series | 2023

Anwesh has also created multiple artworks for Google as part of their 'Search for Change' campaign. He uses his artworks as a way to educate the masses on the pertinence of allyship, and how it acts as a source of hope, inspiration and strength for folx struggling to come out, and to those ostracised by their communities.

==== Artworks for Netflix ====
His captivating artworks have also been featured by Netflix India on their official Instagram page. His notable work includes the poster/fan art for the Indian period drama television series Heeramandi: The Diamond Bazaar, created and directed by Sanjay Leela Bhansali. Sahoo's artistry was further showcased with an illustration celebrating a summer adventure featuring beloved characters from popular shows, including Charlie from Heartstopper, David from Schitt's Creek, Eric from Sex Education, Fabiola from Never Have I Ever, and Dhruv from Class. This artwork, accompanied by the caption, "In my world, they’re all friends 🥰" highlighted the beauty of diverse friendships and the joy of summer.

=== TEDx Experience ===
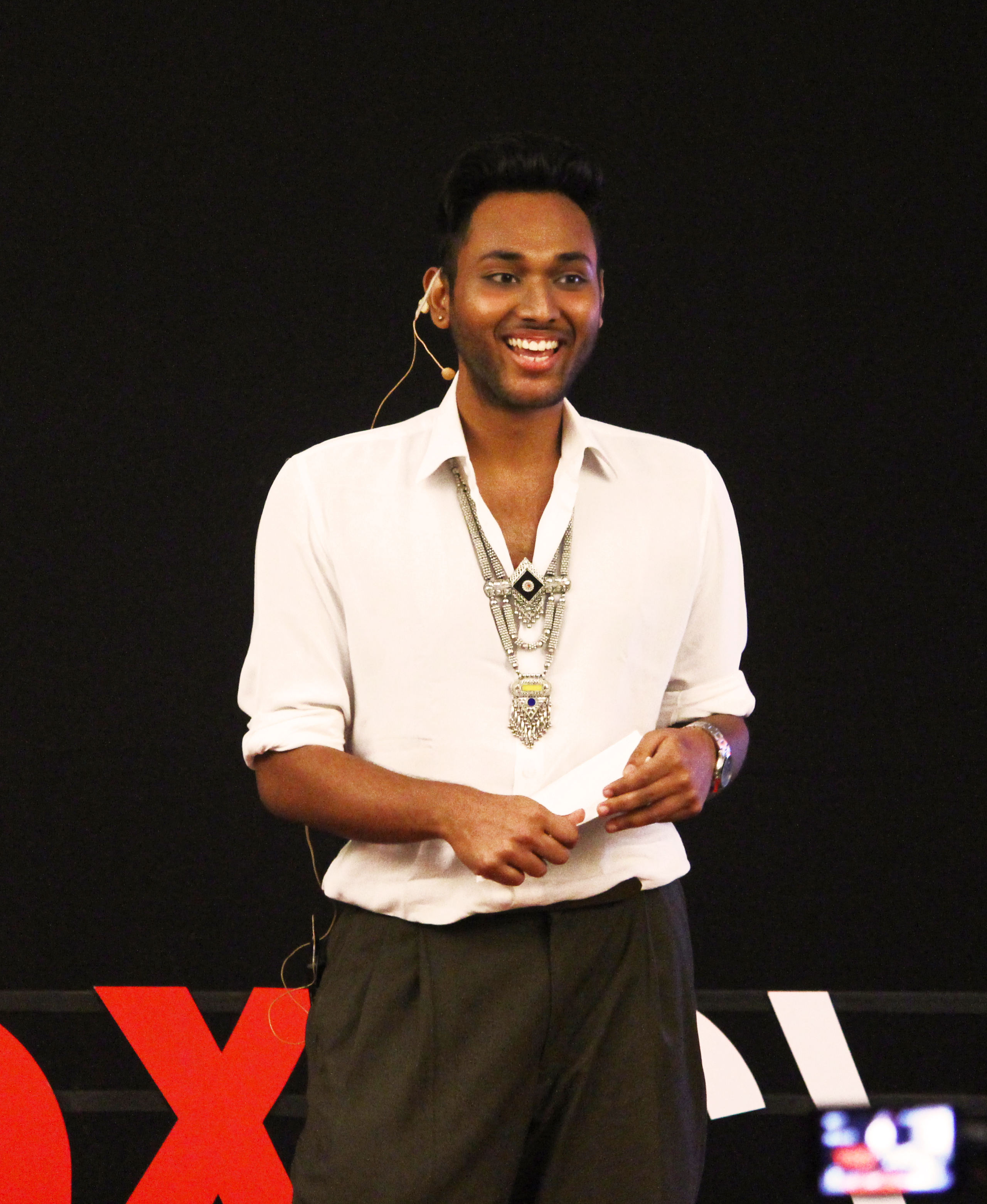
Anwesh at TEDxCVS in Delhi in 2018

Anwesh has spoken at 4 TEDx events: TEDxMAIS 2016 (Mallya Aditi International School, Bangalore), TEDxXIMB 2017 (Xavier's Institute of Management, Bhubaneswar), TEDxCVS (College of Vocational Studies, Delhi University) in 2018 and TEDxXIMB again in 2022. At the first event, Anwesh spoke of the need to break out of the Gender Binary. Through the talk, he challenged a world where sex and gender are often used interchangeably when in reality there exists a clear distinction between the two. He imagines a world where one's identity isn't limited to the binary male or female, but can manifest as a spectrum of infinite possibilities. His second TEDx talk, "Tapping into your Alice," related to growing up in a society that did not know how to deal with those who did not conform to gender stereotypes, in addition to how adulthood drains us of our belief in magic. Anwesh's third talk was called, "Growing up gay in India, and learning to be confident", where he spoke of how "Effeminacy and femininity aren't euphemisms for indignity; being gay, femme, brown, being me, is sexy and powerful!". In 2022, Anwesh returned to the stage of TEDx and spoke extensively on the need for allyship and the need to go beyond just policy-making at workplace. He talked about the struggles of being openly gay in India, where homosexuality continues to be a taboo. He banked on his experience and urged everyone not to be afraid of judgments and speak their minds, for that is the true definition of freedom.

== Awards and recognition ==
Sahoo has received several awards and recognitions for his work in art, design, and activism. His projects often explore themes of identity and LGBTQ+ representation. The following is a list of awards and honors he has received:

- Troy Perry Medal of Pride for Compassionate Activism (2018)
  - Presented by the International Charter for Compassion. This award honors fearless LGBTQ+ young people and community leaders who are making an impact through social and spiritual activism.
- IIIT Delhi Young Alumni Award (2022)
  - Awarded for his contribution in representing and supporting the queer community through his work in Tech, Art, and Design.
- WAHStory Spotlight Awards (2024)
  - Winner in the 30 under 30 category.
- Rising Talent Award (2024)
  - Awarded by the Jagran Influencer & Creator Awards.
- Krakow Film Festival (2024)
  - Recognition for the film poster design of "Amma's Pride."

== See also ==
- Mr Gay India
- Mr India World
- Rohit Khandelwal

Awards and achievements
Preceded by (India) Sushant Divgikar	Mr Gay India; 2014	Succeeded by (India) Darshan Mandhana
