= Mind Mera Mind =

- Directed by: Harsh Agarwal
- Produced by: Neeraj Churi (Lotus Visual)
- Starring: Raghav Sharma, Harshini Misra, Karan Sonic, Shaurya Shah, Saamir Gupta, Jagriti Pandey, Naman Kapoor, Gautam Arora
- Production company: Lotus Visual
- Release date: 2021
- Country: India
- Language: Hindi

Mind Mera Mind is an Indian film depicting how the LGBTQ+ community deal with mental health issues in India. Written and directed by Harsh Agarwal, the film was launched on World Mental health Day. The film uses caricatures of various mental health issues and personifies them and shows how they engage with Prateek (protagonist) that is played by Raghav Sharma. Mind Mera Mind partnered with Grindr for reaching out to the gay and bisexual community in the country. Agarwal's other work include his book Nazaqat.

== Cast ==
- Raghav Sharma (Prateek)
- Harshini Misra (Anxiety Aunty)
- Karan Sonic (Insomnia)
- Shaurya Shah (Self-doubt)
- Saamir Gupta (Vijay)
- Jagriti Pandey (Loneliness)
- Naman Kapoor (Toxic Masculinity)
- Gautam Arora (Depression Bhaiya)
- Pew Banerjee (Therapist & Assistant Director of the film

== Reviews and reception ==
Gaysi published about the film, "Self-doubt, Anxiety Aunty, and Depression Bhaiya are all well fleshed out characters who have a distinct personality of their own. While this comical tone of the film may suit viewers that are at an earlier stage of understanding mental health issues, to a seasoned viewer, it may seem like the seriousness of the topic is brushed off. ‘Mind Mera Mind’ could afford to be a little more nuanced, but it is a film that is entertaining and instrumental in starting conversations around the mental health of the LGBTQ+ community."

Nitin Yadav at Jagran also wrote a review of the film and gave mixed reviews, "The special thing about the film is that it brings a wide variety of aspects in such sort time. It also explains that someone going through mental health issues might not be visibly ill. However, if there was more time. all characters could come out better. For example, characters like loneliness that can lead to mental health issues get very less time in the film" Sonal Verma at News24 wrote, "The large ensemble of actors for a short film doesn’t disappoint and each actor leaves a mark, even if they appear for a single scene. Mind Mera Mind does a great job in delivering the message that it’s important to reach out for help and there is a possibility to get better. The film carries a disclaimer that it’s a representational film and therapy (as shown in the film) might not be the only way to help with mental health, but it could have done a better job to carry that message boldly and still run a risk of showing therapy as a magical process to heal people."

Navodaya Times wrote, "The characters of the film familiar and maybe that is the reason that the film touches the heart of the audience. The way this film portrays the difficult topic of mental health with such ease, is important and should be appreciated. After repealing of section 377, the gay community still suffers from many problems and this film gives a voice and stage to the people."

Anwesh Banerjee at Love Matters appreciated the film for the "curious reimagining" but at the same time, criticized the film for the background music, referring to it as a "distracting element".
