= Stuart Hatton =

English pageant winner, model, and dancer

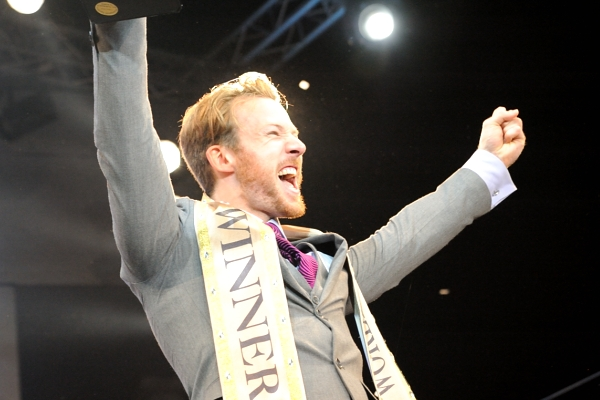
- Stuart Hatton Jr. moments after winning Mr. Gay World 2014
- Born: Stuart Alexander McNichol; 17 June 1985 (age 41); South Shields, Tyne and Wear, England
- Education: St Wilfrid's RC College; South Tyneside College; Newcastle University
- Title: Mr Gay UK 2013; Mr Gay UK 2014; Mr. Gay World 2014
- Parent(s): Peter McNichol; Wendy Hatton

Stuart Hatton (born Stuart Alexander McNichol 17 June 1985) is an English pageant winner, model, and dancer. He was a former Mr. Gay World and for two consecutive years was Mr. Gay UK in 2013 and 2014. He was the first North East man to win the title of Mr. Gay UK.

== Early life ==
Stuart Alexander McNichol was born to Peter McNicol and Wendy Hatton on June 17, 1985, in South Shields, United Kingdom. His mother has a fraternal twin named Stuart Hatton, so when he started using the last name Hatton, he was referred to as Stuart Hatton Jr. Hatton started dancing at 13 months and attended St Wilfrid's RC College for high school, graduating in 2001, followed by South Tyneside College and Newcastle University. Hatton studied Language and Linguistics, originally planning on becoming a speech therapist.

== Career ==
Hatton worked as an underwear model and dance teacher before entering the pageant and modelling world. Hatton teaches at the Hatton Academy of Dance owned by his mother, where he is also co-principal. He specialises in classical, ballroom, and Latin American dance.

=== Pageantry ===
In 2013, he entered and won the Mr. Gay UK contest.

In 2013, Stuart was honored as the first Mr Don’t H8 UK representative for the USA National System Don’t H8. The organization stands for anti-bullying across all spectrums and ran by Chip Matthews (Ronnie Paulley) the CEO/President. Stuart was also inducted into the class of 2015 Don’t H8 Hall of Fame.

In 2014, Hatton was crowned Mr. Gay UK once again, and he went on to win the Mr Gay World 2014 competition. On winning the crown, Hatton stated, "I am now able to use my voice to help those in countries around the world who have no voice or equality rights, such as people in Malaysia and Iran. We are all human, and all gay people around the world deserve the same human rights. This is just the beginning."

=== Modelling ===
Hatton was picked for a contract with Ubisoft, appearing in their Just Dance 4 game for Xbox commercial.

In 2015, he joined with Strictly Come Dancing's Callum MacDonald "for a special same-sex advertising campaign for Freed of London." The two were criticised by Strictly's James Jordan who stated, "If there is a same sex couple dancing… it would be a joke. People wouldn't take it seriously. It would have to be a comedy value." Hatton accused the latter of homophobia and stated he would no longer support Jordan, his shows, or his tours "ever again."

As an underwear model, Hatton has modelled for Bruno Banani, DeadGoodUndies, Mundo Unico, and others.

=== So what? ===
Hatton launched his "So what?" campaign in January 2015. The campaign has an anti-bullying and homophobia awareness platform with people writing "So what?" on their hands and posting their photos to social media. The official slogan of the campaign is: "Some of us have blue eyes, some of us have green eyes. Some of us are straight. Some of us are gay... So what?" The campaign was supported by The Shields Gazette, Alfie Joey, Lorraine Kelly, the cast of Coronation Street, and international Twitter users who used the hashtag #SoWhat.

=== Awards ===
Year	Award	Result
2013	Mr. Gay UK	Won
2013	Mr. Don’t H8 UK	Won
2014	Mr. Gay UK	Won
2014	Mr. Gay Europe	First runner up after Austria was disqualified
2014	Mr. Gay World	Won
2015	Don’t H8 Hall of Fame	Won
Unknown	Carl Alan Award	Nominated

== Personal life ==
Hatton previously dated actor Daniel Brocklebank. The two separated after two years in January 2019.
