= Mr. India =

Mr. or Mister India may refer to:

== Pageants ==
- Rubaru Mister India, a national Indian beauty pageant in India that sends its winners to Mister International, Mister Global, Mister Model International and other international competitions
- Times Mister India, a national beauty pageant in India that sends its winners to Mister World and Mister Supranational
- Gladrags Manhunt and Megamodel Contest, a national beauty pageant in India that sends its winner to Manhunt International
- Grasim Mr. India, a former national beauty pageant in India that sent its winners to Mister World and Mister International
- Mr. Gay India, a national beauty pageant in India that sends its winner to Mr Gay World

== Other uses ==
- Mr. India (1961 film), an Indian film directed by G. P. Sippy
- Mr. India (1987 film), an Indian science fiction film directed by Shekhar Kapur
- Mr India – The Ride, a motion-simulator ride at the Adlabs Imagica amusement park in Mumbai, India
