= Mr Gay UK =

British beauty contest, founded 1982

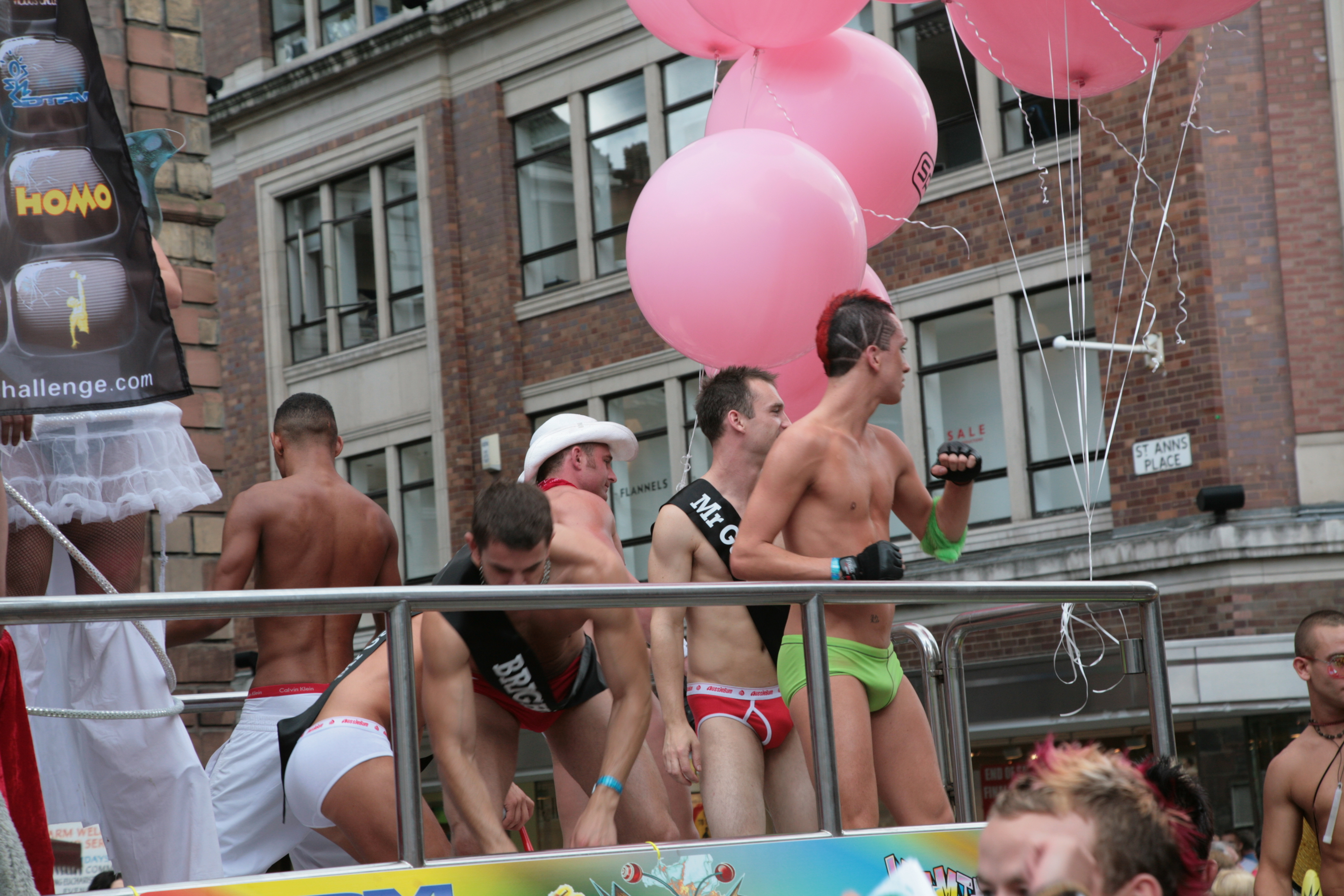
Mr Gay UK contestants at the Manchester Gay Pride parade in 2006

Mr Gay UK was a British annual beauty contest for gay men, with regional heats held in gay nightclubs with a grand final usually at a gay venue. It began in 1982 as "Mr Hardware" (named after a fragrance) designed to promote a gay mail order company. The event, held in the Heaven nightclub, was filmed by the BBC as part of a documentary entitled Something For the Ladies.

In 1984, the competition name was changed to Mr Gay UK. Since then, the event has been recorded for video release (1993), featured on a Channel 4 series, Passengers (1994) and the event itself was broadcast on Five in 1998 and 1999.

The competition's website has not been updated since 2014 and no winners are listed after 2013.

== Mr Gay UK winners ==
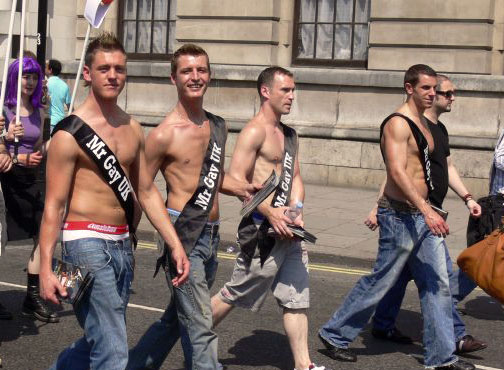
Previous winners at Europride 2006

Year	Winner	Hometown	Profession	Heat Won
1993	Anthony Morley	Leeds		Body Heat @ The Ritzy, Doncaster
1994	David Jackson	Manchester	DJ	Cruz 101, Manchester
1995	Lance Trimble	Birmingham		Subway City, Birmingham
1996	Roy Fairhurst	Leeds	DJ	Primos II, Leeds
1997	Shaun McVeigh	Birmingham	Lift Engineer	The Dome, Birmingham
1998	Ben Harris	London	Builder's Mate	
1999	Mark Ledsham	Preston	Business Student	
2000	Harry French	Glasgow	Lifeguard	Bennets, Glasgow
2001	Carl Austin	Manchester	Events Manager	Cruz 101, Manchester
2002	Rob Conn	Bristol	IT manager	Queens Shilling, Bristol
2003	Jarrod Batchelor	Newport, Isle of Wight	Fireman	
2004	Mark Roberts	Walsall	Plasterer	The Golden Lion, Walsall
2005	Richard Carr	Birmingham	Supermarket Manager	The Nightingale, Birmingham
2006	Mark Carter	Huddersfield	Police Officer	Birmingham
2007	Daniel Broughton	Blackpool	Stage Manager	Flamingo Club, Blackpool
2008	Dino Gamecho	Cardiff	Student	Ritz, Manchester
2009	contest not held			
2010	contest not held			
2011	Samuel Keen	Cardiff	Hairdresser	
2012	Leroy Williamson	Sheffield	Manager	Leeds
2013	Stuart Hatton	South Shields	Model	

Since 2005, the winner has gone on to represent the UK in Mr Gay Europe.

== 2011 contest ==
As with previous years, heats for the 2011 contest were held in various gay venues across the country. Participants could apply in advance directly with the venue, or just turn up on the evening and complete an application form. In total there are 14 finalists from the heats that took place between September and October 2011.

In this year the rules and the feeling of the competition were changed. A public vote was put into place and contestants were expected to campaign for votes in any way they could. Each finalist could receive votes through a premium rate phone and text number, a 'like' on their individual Facebook page and a Twitter and E-mail vote accessible from the main Mr Gay UK website. Voting ended on 29 November 2011 and the five finalists were announced. They were Greg Lumley – Middlesbrough, Charlie Drummond – Bristol, John Wheeldon – Leeds, Nik Chapman – Newcastle and Samuel Kneen – Cardiff, who eventually went on to win the competition

A media relations push was made on the competition with articles appearing in local and regional media and radio, but also had national coverage in guardian.co.uk and the three of finalists appeared on Loose Women bringing on Julie Goodyear.

The grand final was held on Saturday 10 December at Mission 2 in Leeds. Judges included Kieron Richardson from Hollyoaks, Rob Gunn from the competition's sponsor Manhunt and photographer Jay Eff.

== Hosts ==
Presenters have included Dannii Minogue, Lily Savage, Jason Donovan, Mark Little, Robbie Williams, Jane McDonald, Terry George (entrepreneur), Richard Newman, Nadia Almada, Brian Dowling and Philip Olivier and judges have included Jean Paul Gaultier, Michael Cashman, Danny La Rue, Scott Neal, Lea Walker, Jonathan Kerrigan, Su Pollard and Christopher Biggins. In 2007, the presenters were Andy Scott-Lee and his wife Michelle Heaton. The judges were Shahbaz from Big Brother 2006, James Sutton of Hollyoaks, long-standing Adam Lowe of Bent magazine and The Sheilas of Sheilas' Wheels. The event was hosted at Flamingo's nightclub in Blackpool, where Daniel Broughton (also from Blackpool) won.

== Notable contestants ==
Mr Gay 2001, Carl Austin-Behan, became the 119th Lord Mayor of Manchester in 2016, serving until 2017.

Mr Gay UK 2003, Jarrold Batchelor, went on to appear in the Channel 4 reality series, The Games.

In 2006, police officer Mark Carter made national headlines when he won the competition.

Mr Gay UK 1998, Ben Harris, became the winner of the Channel 4 show Playing It Straight in 2004.

In 2008 the first winner of the contest, Anthony Morley, was convicted of murder and cannibalism.

Mr Gay Newcastle 2007, Charlie Drummond, became a Big Brother housemate in the 2009 series, where he sparked an "are they?/aren't they" relationship with fellow bisexual housemate Rodrigo Lopes. He made it to the final, finishing in 4th place. Drummond later went on to become Mr Gay Bristol 2011.

Mr Gay UK winner 2013, Stuart Hatton, went on to represent the United Kingdom in Austria at Mr Gay Europe and was second runner up. Two months later Hatton travelled to Rome, Italy to represent the United Kingdom once more as Mr Gay UK but this time at The Mr Gay World Contest where he won the Mr Gay World title becoming the first United Kingdom winner to receive the global award.

== See also ==
- Mr Gay Europe
