= Vaidya (film) =

- Directed by: Sumit Pawar; Harsh Agarwal
- Written by: Harsh Agarwal
- Produced by: Harsh Agarwal
- Cinematography: Shivam Borkar; Varun Katare
- Edited by: Rahul Tiwari Adhiyari; Mohsin Sheikh
- Music by: Himanshu Dahiya
- Release date: June 2021 (London Indian Film Festival)
- Country: India
- Language: Hindi

Vaidya is a 2021 short film. The film was digitally released at Hotstar and was also screened at London Indian Film Festival.

== Plot ==
The film follows the story of Kabir, a regular corporate guy who meets Vaidya on a beach at his vacation. The two gets attracted to each other and spend time together. However, Kabir has to leave and he promises to come back for Vaidya. Kabir doesn't honor his promise and gets busy with his life. Vaidya confronts him in Gurgaon and the identity of Vaidya is told.

== Cast ==
- Ronit Agrawal as Vaidya
- Puneet Kumar Mishra as Kabir

== Reception ==
Gaysi referred to Vaidya as an "ambiguous and endearing tale of queer love". Dhyanvi Katharani described in her review, "Set outside the restraints of society on a remote beach in Goa, the film creates a utopia of queer love, and at the same time reminds us that this utopia only exists outside society. This is not a film that gives you precise conclusions; on the contrary it leaves room for ambiguity. The lack of a definitive answer keeps the audience gripped throughout the film"

Pune Mirror wrote, "The fact that the film doesn't addresses critical issues like homophobia and plays in its own surreal world where there are no questions asked for being gay pinches and hurts, but also helps the film to stay away from being characterized as another queer movie where key premise is social oppressions or lack of acceptance."

Daiji World penned a review about the film and described, "The beauty of the film is in its message which is rather simple and plays on the fundamental concept of love, togetherness, and separation...Vaidya is an important film not just because it does that but it is also important because it establishes and encourages that it's okay to play with genres and go where no one has been."

Anwesh Sahoo at Gaylaxy magazine wrote in his review, "The film is authentic, also because the actors play it with such simplicity. The subtle moments work. There’s no moment in the film really where they out and about proclaim their love for each other, but you see it in their eyes, the longing, the angst, the fondness and in the end the uncertainty and frustration (again, watch the film to know why!). The film stays true to its namesake, mysterious yet gripping for most parts."

Amar Ujala wrote about the film (translated from Hindi), "Vaidya's story is not just different because it is story of love between two men. It is also different because it ends at an interesting turn. It leaves an emptiness in the mind after watching the film."

== Festivals ==
Apart from London India Film Festival, Vaidya will be screened at KASHISH Mumbai International Queer Film Festival.
