= Vidya (given name) =

Vidya is an Indian given name. It may refer to:

== Women ==
- Vidhya Alakeson, British political aide
- Vidya Bal (1937–2020), Marathi feminist and writer
- Vidya Balan, Indian actress
- Vidya Dehejia, professor and Padma Bhushan recipient
- Vidya Rao, Hindustani classical singer and writer
- Vidya Sinha (1947–2019), Indian actress
- Vidya Subramaniam (b. 1957), Tamil author
- Vidya Subramanian, Carnatic vocalist and teacher

== Men ==
- Vidya Niwas Mishra (1926–2005), scholar and Padma Bushan recipient

== See also ==
- Vidya (disambiguation)
