= Vikram Kolmannskog =

Indian-Norwegian writer, psychotherapist, and jurist

Vikram Kolmannskog (born September 6, 1980) is an Indian-Norwegian writer, psychotherapist, and jurist. His work explores themes of identity, sexuality, spirituality, and cultural hybridity. His writings often combine elements of fiction, memoir, and poetry, addressing topics such as queerness, religion, and migration. Kolmannskog's works are noted for their candid explorations of intimacy and human connection, often challenging societal norms and expectations.

== Early life and education ==
Kolmannskog was born to a Norwegian father and an Indian mother, and his multicultural background has significantly influenced his work. He studied law and human rights before transitioning into psychotherapy and writing. His academic work often addresses intersections of migration, queerness, and mental health, reflecting both his professional expertise and personal experiences.

== Climate refugees ==
In 2008, as a legal adviser working with the Norwegian Refugee Council, Kolmannskog wrote Future Floods of Refugees: A Comment on Climate Change, Conflict, and Forced Migration. This became the starting point for the work that he and the Norwegian Refugee Council did to improve the rights of so-called climate refugees. Kolmannskog was acknowledged for his 'outstanding work' in this field by António Guterres, who was the UN High Commissioner for Refugees at the time.

In 2014, Kolmannskog was awarded a Doctorate of Philosophy at the University of Oslo on the basis of his sociolegal research on the needs and rights of so-called climate refugees.

== Gestalt therapy ==
Kolmannskog has practiced as a gestalt therapist since 2012. In this field too he has been particularly concerned with research related to marginalised groups, including trans folks. Since 2015, he has held a part-time teaching and research position at the Norwegian Gestalt Institute. In March 2022, on the basis of his research and pedagogical work and competence within the field, he became the world's first professor of gestalt therapy.

== Literature ==
Kolmannskog has published a range of works, including fiction, poetry, and academic writing. His literary style blends introspection with social commentary, creating a unique voice that resonates with readers across different cultures and identities.

Much of his work explores the intersections of queerness, sexuality, and spirituality. With Taste and See: A Queer Prayer, published in 2018 by Mohini Books, he became known as an author who 'reconciles religiosity, spirituality and being queer'. His work was described as 'a spiritual and sensual prayer' and 'a lyrical study of passion, both religious and carnal'.

In 2018, Routledge published The Empty Chair: Tales from Gestalt Therapy. This book is an introduction to gestalt therapy as well as a collection of clinical tales, and Kolmannskog has been compared to Irvin D. Yalom.

Many of his poems and short stories have been written during, and as part of, the Indian LGBTQ mobilisation, and he has been a regular contributor to Indian LGBTQ magazines such as Gaylaxy. On 6 September 2019, on the one-year anniversary of the Indian decriminalisation of homosexuality, a collection of his short stories Lord of the Senses was published by queer-of-colour–centric press Team Angelica. In March 2020, Lord of the Senses was announced as one of the Lambda Literary Award finalists in Oprah Magazine. The book delves into themes of spirituality, desire, and self-discovery. The short stories follow characters navigating complex relationships and grappling with the boundaries between physical pleasure and emotional fulfillment. The collection also reflects Kolmannskog's broader interest in integrating spiritual practices into everyday life. Drawing on his background in psychotherapy, the narrative examines how individuals reconcile conflicting aspects of their identity, including sexuality and cultural expectations.

In connection with the poetry collection The Garden Tantra (Red River, 2023), Ruth Vanita described Vikram as 'one of the twenty-first century heirs of Walt Whitman'.

In 2024, Rhyheim: A Porn Poem was published by Broken Sleep Books. According to Diriye Osman, 'Vikram Kolmannskog understands the syntax of the spiritual and the sensual, and this devotional to Rhyheim Shabazz is spellbinding. Kolmannskog remains a rare talent.'

In 2026, Reflections on Parenting from a Gestalt Therapist-Father: Life with Leo was published by Routledge, with advance praise from authorities inside and outside the gestalt therapy field. While the book has a queer dimension, not least documenting Vikram and his family's co-parenting arrangement, Rajeev Balasubramanyam wrote 'Every parent should read this!' In addition to gestalt therapy, Vikram draws heavily upon mindfulness, and Jack Kornfield has recommended the book.

== Themes and influence ==
Kolmannskog's writing often engages with themes of queerness, spirituality, and hybridity. As a queer man of mixed heritage, he uses his work to challenge normative narratives and create space for alternative perspectives. His approach is influenced by his psychotherapy practice, which emphasizes the integration of mind, body, and spirit.

Kolmannskog has been described as a key voice in contemporary queer literature, particularly in Scandinavia. He is also listed in the Encyclopedic Dictionary of Diasporic Indian English Writing

== Bibliography ==
- Reflections on Parenting from a Gestalt Therapist-Father: Life with Leo (Routledge, 2026)
- Rhyheim: A Porn Poem (Broken Sleep Books, 2024)
- The Garden Tantra (Red River, 2023)
- Becoming Buddha. Meditations (Mohini Books, 2020)
- Lord of the Senses. Stories (Team Angelica, 2019)
- The Empty Chair. Tales from Gestalt Therapy (Routledge, 2018)
- Taste and See. A Queer Prayer (Mohini Books, 2018)
- We are in between. Rights for people displaced in the context of climate change (2017)
