= Sushant Divgikar =

Indian model, actor, and TV personality

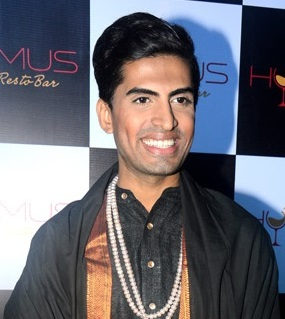
- Divgikar at the launch party of HYMUS nightclub in Mumbai, 2014
- Born: 2 July 1990 (age 36); Mumbai, India
- Other name: Rani Ko-HE-Nur (Drag queen persona)
- Citizenship: Indian
- Education: Masters degree in Industrial and Organisational Psychology from University of Mumbai, Maharashtra, India.
- Occupations: Actor; singer; VJ; model; drag queen; columnist
- Years active: 2006–present
- Agent(s): Parambir Kaur (Mango films and Productions)
- Known for: Queer representation Drag Queen

Sushant Divgikar, also known as Rani Ko-HE-Nur, (born 2 July 1990) is an Indian model, actor, singer, columnist, motivational speaker, drag queen, pageant director, and video jockey. In July 2014, they were crowned Mr Gay India 2014. They represented India at Mr Gay World 2014. They won various special awards during Mr Gay World 2014, and have been the only delegate from India to win three sub awards. Divgikar is the first Indian and the first delegate from any country to have won a record 3 individual sub titles and 2 group sub titles at the Mr Gay World 2014 contest.

They participated in the television reality show Bigg Boss 8.

Divgikar, in their drag queen persona Rani Ko-HE-Nur, created history by becoming the first drag queen in India to participate in a singing reality show and win the golden buzzer, making Rani / Sushant the first contestant from the LGBTQIA+ community to win a golden buzzer and directly enter the top 15 of the reality competition show Sa Re Ga Ma Pa in the year 2018. In 2021, under their drag persona, they were announced to be competing in the premiere season of Queen of the Universe, an international singing competition for drag performers. The series premiered on 2 December 2021.

Divgikar has featured in many television shows and has worked with most of the leading broadcasting channels, agencies and production houses, nationally and internationally.

== Early life and background ==
Divgikar was born on 2 July 1990 in Mumbai, India, and was raised in their family home in Bandra West. Divgikar was born to Goan Konkani parents, Pradeep Divgikar and Bharati Divgikar. Their father, Pradeep is a retired Assistant Commissioner, Indian Customs and Central Excise and former President of the Greater Mumbai Amateur Aquatics Association (GMAAA).

== Career ==
Divgikar started their TV career with UTV Bindass's Big Switch Season 3 directed by Rohit Shetty. They then did Atyachaar Ka Punchnama for UTV Bindass as a host. They were a contestant on Color TV's Bigg Boss 8. They participated in Mr Gay World 2014. They were among the top 10 finalists and is the first person in the history of the pageant to have three sub awards – Mister Gay World Congeniality 2014, Mister People's Choice & Mister Gay World Art 2014. They have also worked on TV commercials for brands like Maruti Suzuki, MTV India, Channel V India, Idea mobiles. Alongside acting and TV, they won several awards and titles between 2011 and 2013.

In 2015, they were the guest in Colors TV's India's Got Talent and Zoom's Style Panga. They were also the guest in the grand finale of &TV's Killerr Karaoke Atka Toh Latkah. Two documentary films, both based on their life, have been nominated and screened at various national and international festivals. Presently, they will soon be seen in an online series Love, Life and Screw Ups.

Divgikar, both in and out of drag, was listed as one of GQ's 50 Most Influential Young Indians of 2018.

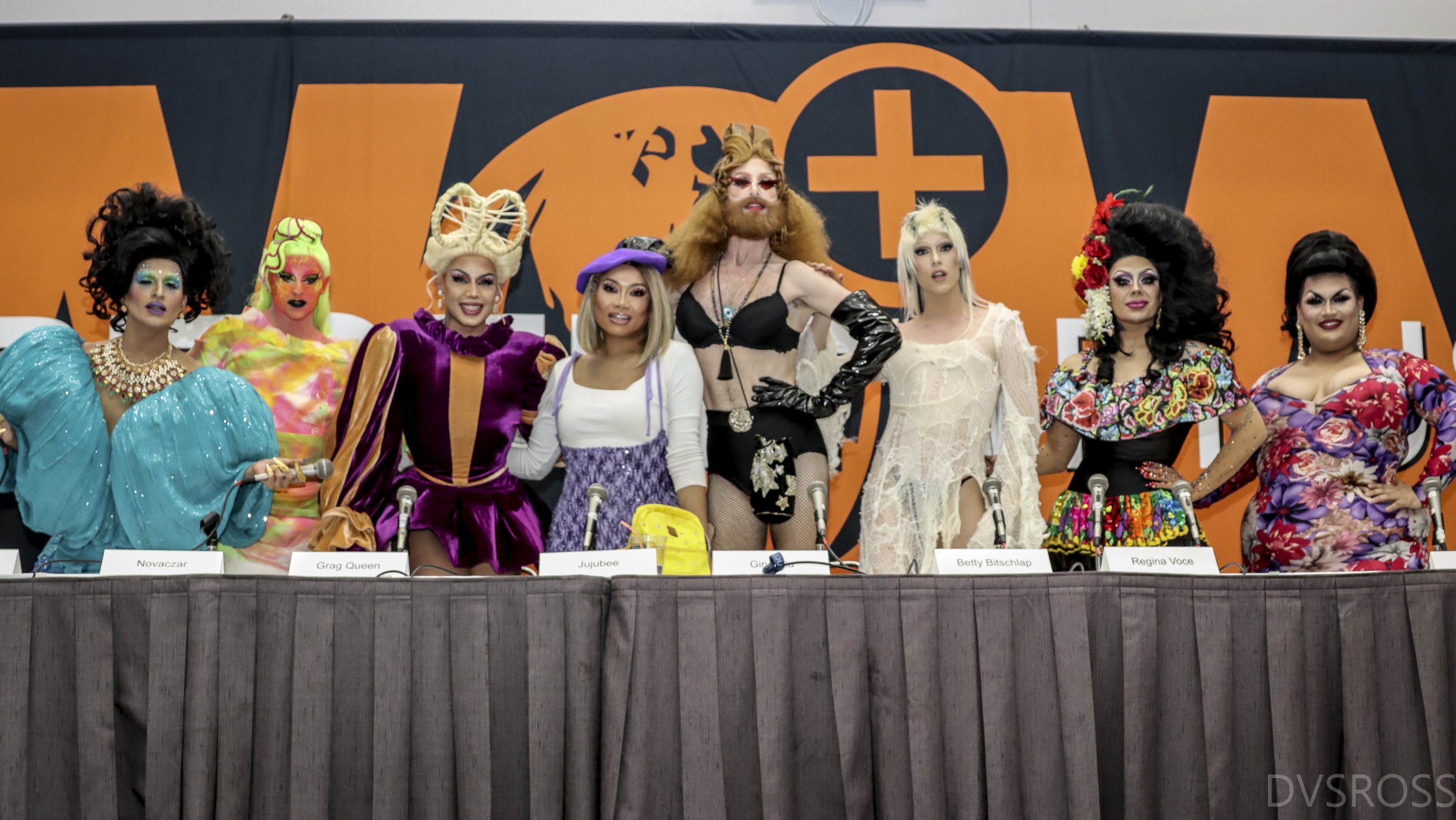
Queen of the Universe Contestants at LA DragCon 2022.

=== Queen of the Universe ===
In November 2021, they were announced as one of fourteen contestants on the debut season of Queen of the Universe, an international drag queen singing competition, and a spin-off of RuPaul's Drag Race.

Queen of the Universe season 1 performances and results
Week #	Theme	Song choice	Original artist	Order #	Result
2	This Is Me	"Piya Tu Ab To Aja", "Laila Main Laila"	Asha Bhosle & R.D. Burman, Ram Sampath, Kalyanji–Anandji & JAM8	3	Advanced
3	Turn Back Time	"My Heart Will Go On"	Celine Dion	6	Advanced
4	Duets	"Damn That Man"	Grag Queen and Rani Ko-HE-Nur	1	Advanced
5	Bad Girls	"Bad Romance"	Lady Gaga	2	Eliminated

== Filmography ==
=== Television ===
Year	Name	Role	Notes	Ref
2012	Atyachaar Ka Punchnama	Host		
2012	Big Switch 3	Guest		
2013	Welcome – Baazi Mehmaan Nawazi Ki	Contestant	Along with Sanaya Irani	
2014	Bigg Boss 8	Contestant (Evicted on Day 49)		
2015	Killerr Karaoke Atka Toh Latkah	Contestant	Along with Sonali Raut	
2015	India's Got Talent 6	Guest	Along with Mouni Roy	
2015	Style Panga	Host		
2016	Box Cricket League 2	Contestant	Player in Ahmadabad Express	
2018	Sa Re Ga Ma Pa Hindi 2018	Contestant	Came as Rani Ko He Noor	
2021	Queen of the Universe	Herself	Contestant (4th/5th place)	
2024	36 Days	Tara aka Tarun	series on SonyLIV	

=== Music videos ===
Year	Title	Artist(s)	Lyrics	Music	Ref.
2021	"3 Devi"	Sushant Divgikar & Supriyaa Ram	Karthik Saragur, Ashvin A. Matthew	Dossmode	

=== Web series ===
Year	Title	Role	Notes	Ref.
2017	101 India	Herself	Episode: "A Drag Queen Sandwich With Alaska Thunderf**k and Rani Ko-He-Nur"	
2024	36 Days			

== Discography ==
=== Singles ===
==== Featured singles ====
Title	Year	Album	Ref.
"Damn That Man" (with Grag Queen)	2021	non-album singles	

== Awards and nominations ==
- Mr. Gay world India 2014 – Won
- Mr. Congeniality, Mr. Gay world 2014 – Won
- Mr. People's choice, Mr. Gay world 2014 – Won
- Mr. Arts challenge, Mr. Gay world, 2014 – Nominated
- Team sports challenge, Mr. Gay world 2014 – Nominated
- Team Arts challenge, Mr. Gay world 2014 – Nominated
- Mr. Gay world, 2014, Rome – Top 10 Grand Finalist
- Best Anchor in a reality or music and danced based, Indian Television Academy Awards (Atyachaar Ka Punchnama) – Nominated

== Personal life ==
Divgikar has an older brother, Karan Divgikar, who works as a flight attendant at Qatar Airways. Divgikar is a certified Psychologist and holds a master's degree in Industrial psychology.

In January 2021, Divgikar came out as genderfluid via an Instagram post, stating their pronouns are "he", "she", and "they". In 2026, they revealed that they have started gender transition, which will be completed by 2027.

== See also ==
- Mr Gay India
- Mr India World
- Prateik Jain
- Queen of the Universe (TV series)

Awards and achievements
Preceded by (India) Nolan Lewis	Mr Gay India; 2014	Succeeded by (India) Anwesh Sahoo
