= Vidya =

Vidya may refer to:

- Vidya (philosophy), a concept in Hindu and Buddhist philosophy
- Vidya (journal), a bimonthly journal published by the Triple Nine Society
- Vidya (film), a 1948 Bollywood film
- A slang term for video games

== People ==
- Vijja, 8th or 9th century Sanskrit poet, alternatively known as Vidya

== See also ==
- Vaidya, term for a practitioner of Ayurvedic medicine
  - Baidya, an Indian caste
- Vaidya (film), 2021 Indian film
- Vidyasagar (disambiguation)
- Avidya (disambiguation)
