= Mr. Gay India =

Gay male beauty contest

Mr Gay World India
- Formation: 2008
- Type: Beauty Pageant
- Headquarters: Pune
- Location: India
- Members: Mr Gay World; Mr. Gay International
- Official language: Hindi, English
- National director: Sriram Sridhar
- Key people: Shyam Konnur, Suresh Ramdas, Siddhant Awad
- Website: mrgayworldindiaofficial.in

Mr Gay World India is a national beauty pageant that selects its winner to represent India at gay pageants globally, including to the annual Mr Gay World competition. The National Director and Producer of the organization is the director of Mist LGBTQ Foundation, Sriram Sridhar.

The inception of the pageant happened in 2008 when Zoltan Parag was crowned the first Mr. Gay India. The event received media attention heavily when popular model and reality star Sushant Divgikar won the pageant in 2014. Subsequently, the pageant which at first was irregular is now held annually in different cities of India.

== History ==
Zoltan Parag was the first ever winner of Mr. Gay India. He represented India at International Mr Gay Competition in 2008.

Mr. Gay India got tremendous national and international recognition only after Nolan Lewis from Mumbai made it to the top 10 at the Mr. Gay World pageant in 2013. He paved way for the next winner, Sushant Divgikar, who went on to represent India in 2014 in Rome.

Sushant Divgikar broke all existing records by a notable performance at the Mr. Gay World pageant in Rome that year and won 3 individual sub awards as well as the team sports sub award alongside delegates from Iceland, Indonesia and Hong Kong. He won 3 individual sub awards viz. Mr.Gay World Congeniality, Mr.Gay World People's Choice and Mr.Gay World Art challenge. Sushant made it to the top 10 but did not succeed in bringing his home country the crown.

In 2015, Sushant was announced the National Producer and Director for India and was in charge of the Indian leg of the pageant, making him the youngest National producer in the pageant's history while also being the reigning Mr.Gay INDIA at the time. Sushant continued his reign for a record, two years and represented not only the gay community but also the entire LGBT community in India's biggest celebrity reality show, Bigg Boss in its eighth season. In 2016, Anwesh Sahoo became the first contestant from Odisha, and the youngest winner at just 20 years of age to win the crown. Anwesh represented India in Malta, Europe for Mr.Gay World 2016 and made it to the top 12. In 2017 Darshan Mandhana won the Mr Gay India 2017 crown and represented India at Mr Gay World 2017 where he made it to top 10. In 2018, Samarpan Maiti of West Bengal bagged the coveted Mr. Gay India title and represented India at the Mr. Gay World Pageant in Knysna, South Africa, making it to the top 3 (2nd runner up) spot, a feat that was not conquered previously by any other representatives from India.

In 2019, Suresh Ramadas, from Bangalore, Karnataka won the title of Mr. Gay India, beating the finalists in the National Pageant to represent India at the Mr. Gay World Pageant in South Africa where he made it to the top 10 mega finalists and kept India’s record of always making it to the top 10 Finalists in the world.

In early 2020, Ramdas passed on his crown and his impressive reign to Shyam Konnur and was supposed to represent the country at the Mr. Gay World pageant in South Africa in May 2020 but unfortunately, this was not possible due to the novel corona virus pandemic outbreak around the world. The Mr. Gay world organisation decided to postpone if not cancel the pageant for the year 2020 and hold a special showing for National winners from around the world to compete at the international level in 2021.

After a long wait, the 2023 pageant happened on the October 5th, and Vishal Pinjani was titled the Mr Gay World India 2023. He represented India at the Mr Gay World pageant in South Africa during the end of Oct 2023 and was one of the Top 5.

== Representatives to Mister Gay World ==
Color key

- Declared as Winner
- Ended as Runner-up
- Ended as one of the Finalists or Semi-finalists

Year	Delegate	State	Placement	Special Awards
2023	Vishal pinjani	Maharasthra	top 5	
Not held due to covid 19 pandemic				
2020	Shyam konnur	Maharashtra	Unplaced	
2019	Suresh Ramdas	Karnataka	Unplaced	
2018	Samarpan Maiti	West Bengal	2nd Runner up	
2017	Darshan Mandhana	Mumbai, Maharashtra	Top 10	
2016	Anwesh Sahoo	Odisha	Top 12	
2014	Sushant Divgikar	Maharashtra	Top 10	Mister Congeniality - Winner; Mister Art - Winner; People's Choice Award - Winner; Team Sports - Winner
2013	Nolan Lewis	Maharashtra	Top 10	
2011	Raul Patil	Maharashtra	Unplaced	
2009	Bhavin Shivji Gala	Mumbai	Did not compete	
