= Mr Gay World 2014 =

- Date: August 31, 2014
- Venue: Rome, Italy
- Broadcaster: Mr Gay World Official Site
- Entrants: 32
- Placements: 10
- Debuts: Cambodia; Cameroon; Costa Rica; Cyprus; Indonesia
- Returns: Bulgaria; Iceland; Ireland; Italy; Venezuela
- Winner: Stuart Hatton Jr. United Kingdom

Mr Gay World 2014, the 6th Mr Gay World competition, was held in Rome, Italy on August 31, 2014. At the end of the event Chris Olwage, Mr Gay World 2013 from New Zealand crowned Stuart Hatton Mr. Gay U.K., his successor as Mr Gay World 2014.

== Results ==
Final results	Contestant
Mr Gay World 2014	United Kingdom – Stuart Hatton
1st Runner-Up	Cyprus – Kiriakos Spanos
2nd Runner-Up	Ireland – Robbie Lawlor
3rd Runner-Up	Venezuela – Luis Vento
4th Runner-Up	Hong Kong – Bridge Hudson
Top 10	Iceland – Troy Michael Johnson; India – Sushant Divgikar; Philippines – Randolph Val Palma; South Africa – Wernel De Waal; Spain – Edgar Moreno

== Special awards ==
- Mister Gay World Congeniality Winner 2014
- Mister Gay World Art Challenge Winner 2014
- Mister Gay World Online Voting Winner 2014
- Mister Gay World Sports Challenge Winner 2014
- Mister Gay World Photogenic Winner 2014
- Video Presentation Challenge Winner 2014
- DNA Photoshoot Challenge Winner 2014
- Written Test Challenge Winner 2014
  - Canada - Christepher Wee
- Special Challenge Winner (Baking) 2014
  - India - Sushant Divgikar

== Contestants ==
32 delegates have been confirmed:

Country	Contestant	Age
Australia	Christopher Glebatsas	35
Austria	Klaus Burkart	21
Belgium	Willem Joris	28
Bulgaria	Georgi Todorov	32
Cambodia	Chetra Chan Hun	25
Cameroon	Julien Mbiada	29
Canada	Christepher Wee	NA
Costa Rica	Javier Alfaro	34
Cyprus	Kiriakos Spanos	26
Czech Republic	Michal Klapetek	29
Denmark	Christian-Sebastian	24
Finland	Peter Linden	29
France	Jordan Joly	22
Germany	Fabrice Gayakpa	26
Hong Kong	Bridge Hudson	30
Iceland	Troy Michael Jónsson	27
India	Sushant Divgikar	24
Indonesia	Arozak Salam	26
Ireland	Robbie Lawlor	23
Italy	Nicola La Triglia	23
Mexico	Pedro Cervantes	26
Namibia	Nelson Goagoseb	33
New Zealand	Troy Williams	33
Northern Ireland	Nick Flanagan	22
Philippines	Randolph Val Palma	30
South Africa	Werner de Waal	26
Spain	Edgar Moreno	33
Syria	Feras	32
United Kingdom	Stuart Hatton Jr	29
USA	Damien Rodgers	33
Venezuela	Luis Vento	33

== National pageant notes ==
=== Debuts ===
- Cambodia
- Cameroon
- Costa Rica
- Cyprus

=== Returning countries ===
- Last competed in 2010:
  - Italy
- Last competed in 2011:
  - Iceland
- Last competed in 2012:
  - Bulgaria
  - Ireland
  - Venezuela
