= St Wilfrid's Roman Catholic College =

St Wilfrid's RC College

Location
- Temple Park Road; South Shields, South Tyneside, NE34 0PH; England
- Coordinates: 54.9752°N 1.4293°W

Information
- Type: Academy
- Motto: Latin: Excellentia per fidem, per scientiam, per adiuvatum (Excellence through faith, learning, and support)
- Religious affiliation: Roman Catholic
- Local authority: South Tyneside
- Department for Education URN: 142601 Tables
- Ofsted: Reports
- Executive Headteacher: F Craik
- Gender: Mixed
- Age: 11 to 19
- Houses: Aidan (Blue), Bede (Red), Cuthbert (Yellow), Hilda (Green), Margaret Clitherow (Orange)
- Patron: Wilfrid
- Website: http://www.st-wilfrids.org/

St Wilfrid's RC College is a mixed Roman Catholic secondary school and sixth form located in South Shields, South Tyneside, England.

St Wilfrid's RC College was previously a voluntary aided school and Mathematics and Computing College administered by South Tyneside Metropolitan Borough Council. In January 2016 the school was converted to academy status, however St Wilfrid's continues to coordinate with South Tyneside Metropolitan Borough Council for admissions. The school continues to be under the guidance of the Roman Catholic Diocese of Hexham and Newcastle.
