= Mr Gay Europe =

Gay male beauty contest

Mr Gay Europe is a male competition for gay Europeans about important LGBTQIA+ themes. Every year a new Mr. Gay Europe will be crowned, who will be an ambassador for the LGBTQIA+ community. It was founded by its former President, Morten Rudå and its current President, Tore Aasheim; and was hosted for the first time in 2005.

== History ==
In 2005, the competition was held in Oslo, Norway and the winner was Alexander van Kempen from the Netherlands. The following year, Amsterdam was the host city.

In 2006 at Amsterdam, Nandor Gyongyosi of Hungary won the title.

Mr Gay Europe Contest 2007 was held in Budapest, August 5, as part of Pride Island Europa, Central and Eastern Europe's largest new International GLBTQ celebration. The winner was Germany's Jackson Netto.

In 2008, again in Budapest, the competition was won by Spain's Antonio Pedro Almijez.

In 2009, the competition was held in Oslo and won by Spain's Sergio Lara. In 2010, the competition was supposed to be in Geneva, Switzerland, but was cancelled. In 2011 the competition was in Braşov, Romania. The 2010/2011 winner was Giulio Spatola, from Palermo (Italy).

In 2012, the competition was held in Rome, Italy and won by Miguel Ortiz from Spain.

In 2013, the event was held in Prague and Robbie O'Bara of Ireland won Mr Gay Europe 2013. Robbie is originally from Canada of Canadian/Japanese descent and has returned to that country to start practising as a medical doctor.

In 2014, the competition was held in Austria (14 of June, Bregenz). For the first time in MGE history, the contest took the delegates on a journey through the hosting country. The finale took place in the Bregenzer Festspielhaus. Mr Gay Europe 2014 title goes home to Scandinavia with Jack Johansson of Sweden. The judging panel included Tore Aasheim, the president of Mr. Gay Europe, and Coenie Kukkuk, the Director Africa & Middle East of Mr. Gay World.

In 2015, the competition was cancelled but was rescheduled to be held in Sweden and Norway 29. July to 7. August 2016, starting in Stockholm with the Pride Parade, before journeying west to Trondheim and Oslo. Belgium’s Raf Van Puymbroeck took home the title of Mr Gay Europe 2016.

In 2017, the competition was held in Stockholm, Sweden and won by Matt Rood from England.

In 2018, the competition was held in Warsaw and Poznan in Poland, and was won by Enrique Doleschy from Germany.

== Previous winners ==
Year	Delegate	From	Venue
2005	Alexander van Kempen	Netherlands	Oslo, Norway
2006	Nándi Gyöngyösi	Hungary	Amsterdam, Netherlands
2007	Jackson Netto	Germany	Budapest, Hungary
2008	Antonio Pedro Almijez	Spain	Budapest, Hungary
2009	Sergio Lara	Spain	Oslo, Norway
2011	Giulio Spatola	Italy	Poiana Brașov, Romania
2012	Miguel Ortiz	Spain	Rome, Italy
2013	Robbie O'Bara	Ireland	Prague, Czech Republic
2014	Jack Johansson	Sweden	Bregenz, Austria
2016	Raf Van Puymbroeck	Belgium	Oppdal, Norway
2017	Matt Rood	England	Stockholm, Sweden
2018	Enrique Doleschy	Germany	Poznań, Poland
2019	Alexander Petrov	Bulgaria	Cologne, Germany
2022	Paul Dennison	England	Alnwick Castle, England
2023	Tim Küsters	Netherlands	Alnwick Castle, England

== Results ==
=== 2005 in Oslo ===
Country	Contestant	Age	Height	Title
Austria	Aaron Michael Jackson	32	1.86 m (6 ft 1 in)	
Bulgaria	Ivan Penev	23	1.79 m (5 ft 10 1/2 in)	
Denmark	Hugues Maxime Germany	37	1.85 m (6 ft 1 in)	
Estonia	Urmas Külama	25	1.84 m (6 ft 1/2 in)	
Germany	Suat Bahçeci	19	1.74 m (5 ft 8 1/2 in)	
Hungary	Kyan Smith	21	1.87 m (6 ft 1 1/2 in)	
Italy	Alessandro Tamburrino	22	1.87 m (6 ft 1 1/2 in)	
Lapland	Erik Berg	21	173	
Latvia	Normunds Beinerts	22	1.84 m (6 ft 1/2 in)	
Netherlands	Alexander van Kempen	20	1.81 m (5 ft 11 1/2 in)	Mr Gay Europe 2005
Norway	David Thorkildsen	20	1.81 m (5 ft 11 1/2 in)	
Sweden	Jörgen Tenor	20	1.84 m (6 ft 1/2 in)	
Switzerland	Sven Müller	26	1.78 m (5 ft 10 in)	

=== 2006 in Amsterdam ===
Country	Contestant	Age	Height	Title
Austria	Aaron Michael Jackson	33	1.86 m (6 ft 1 in)	
Belgium	Bart Hesters	20	1.82 m (5 ft 11 1/2 in)	
Bulgaria	Vassil Nikolov	20	1.85 m (6 ft 1 in)	
Denmark	Mikkel Svarre	29	1.77 m (5 ft 9 1/2 in)	
France	Jules	24	1.75 m (5 ft 9 in)	
Gran Canaria	Edgar González	26	1.78 m (5 ft 10 in)	
Hungary	Nándi Gyöngyösi	29	1.78 m (5 ft 10 in)	Mr Gay Europe 2006
Ireland	Keith Kearney	25	1.75 m (5 ft 9 in)	
Italy	Salvatore Carfora	22	1.82 m (5 ft 11 1/2 in)	
Lapland	Tobias Johansson	26	1.79 m (5 ft 10 1/2 in)	
Lithuania	Liūtas Balčiūnas	21	1.85 m (6 ft 1 in)	
Macedonia	Ivica M.	21	1.85 m (6 ft 1 in)	
Netherlands	Joep Mesman	24	1.81 m (5 ft 11 1/2 in)	
Norway	Olav Hanto	31	1.73 m (5 ft 8 in)	
Russia	Nikita Kutuzoff	24	1.80 m (5 ft 11 in)	
Sweden	Henrik Lindholm	19	1.97 m (6 ft 5 1/2 in)	
Wales	Matthew Jones	34	1.87 m (6 ft 1 1/2 in)	

=== 2007 in Budapest ===
Country	Contestant	Age	Height	Title
Azerbaijan	Sadikh Ragimov	19	1.69 m (5 ft 6 1/2 in)	
Belgium	Jens Taghon	19	1.78 m (5 ft 10 in)	
Bulgaria	Ivo Krustev	29	1.81 m (5 ft 11 1/2 in)	
Denmark	Mikkel Svarre	30	1.77 m (5 ft 9 1/2 in)	
France	Yori Bailleres	23	1.73 m (5 ft 8 in)	
Gran Canaria	Leonardo Luíz Murilo	19	1.80 m (5 ft 11 in)	
Germany	Jackson Netto	25	1.77 m (5 ft 9 1/2 in)	Mr Gay Europe 2007
Hungary	Deam Ladányi	24	1.73 m (5 ft 8 in)	
Ireland	John Rice	23	1.82 m (5 ft 11 1/2 in)	2nd Runner-Up
Israel	Shachar Eyal	25	1.73 m (5 ft 8 in)	
Italy	Diego Gerolimi	23	1.87 m (6 ft 1 1/2 in)	
Lapland	Thor-Kjetil Sundbakk	29	1.65 m (5 ft 5 in)	
Macedonia	Kiko	21	1.78 m (5 ft 10 in)	
Moldova	Eugeniu	24	1.80 m (5 ft 11 in)	
Netherlands	Stefan Onland	19	1.85 m (6 ft 1 in)	
Northern Ireland	Mikey Robinson	21	1.74 m (5 ft 8 1/2 in)	
Norway	Marius Svela	20	1.86 m (6 ft 1 in)	
Poland	Przemysław Rogacki	22	1.82 m (5 ft 11 1/2 in)	
Portugal	José Marques	23	170	
Romania	Emanuel	25	1.75 m (5 ft 9 in)	
Serbia	Blagoje Bjeloglav	24	1.83 m (6 ft 0 in)	
Slovenia	Lev Dermota	24	1.90 m (6 ft 3 in)	
Spain	José Luís Fuster Genovart	24	1.80 m (5 ft 11 in)	
United Kingdom	Mark E. Carter	24	1.81 m (5 ft 11 1/2 in)	1st Runner-Up

=== 2008 in Budapest ===
Country	Contestant	Age	Height	Title
Austria	Michael Fröhle	24	1.77 m (5 ft 9 1/2 in)	
Belgium	Lionel Grégoire	23	1.80 m (5 ft 11 in)	
Bulgaria	Deyan Kolev	28	1.76 m (5 ft 9 1/2 in)	2nd Runner-Up
Czech Republic	Jakub Starý	22	1.87 m (6 ft 1 1/2 in)	
Gran Canaria	Dempsey	26	1.88 m (6 ft 2 in)	
Hungary	Péter Gyökeres	21	1.70 m (5 ft 7 in)	
Iceland	Hreinn Erlingsson	22	1.71 m (5 ft 7 1/2 in)	
Ireland	Barry Meegan	29	1.88 m (6 ft 2 in)	
Italy	Fabrizio Caiazza	33	1.80 m (5 ft 11 in)	
Lithuania	Vipas Burnickis	20	1.79 m (5 ft 10 1/2 in)	
Malta	Steve Grech	27	1.78 m (5 ft 10 in)	1st Runner-Up
Netherlands	Stefan Onland	20	1.86 m (6 ft 1 in)	
Northern Ireland	Graeme Williamson	25	1.91 m (6 ft 3 in)	
Norway	Kai Thomas Ryen Larsen	21	1.79 m (5 ft 10 1/2 in)	
Portugal	Paulo Almeida	33	1.78 m (5 ft 10 in)	
Romania	Alex Ocros	22	1.77 m (5 ft 9 1/2 in)	
Russia	Andrey Vernadsky	26	1.80 m (5 ft 11 in)	
Serbia	Ivan Maljukanović	19	1.80 m (5 ft 11 in)	
Slovak Republic	Robert Pusztai	18	1.81 m (5 ft 11 1/2 in)	
Slovenia	Lev Dermota	26	1.90 m (6 ft 3 in)	
Spain	Antonio Pedro Almijez	22	1.77 m (5 ft 9 1/2 in)	Mr Gay Europe 2008
Sweden	Joachim Brattfjord Corneliusson	21	1.85 m (6 ft 1 in)	
Wales	Matthew Jones	36	1.83 m (6 ft 0 in)	

=== 2009 in Oslo ===
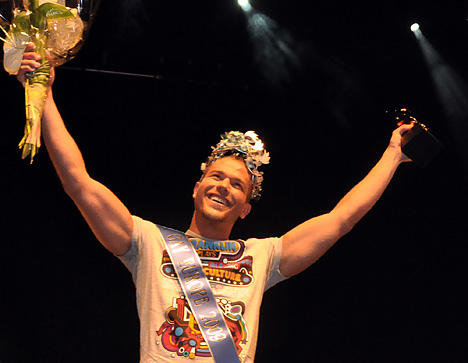
Sergio Lara winner Mr Gay Europe 2009

Country	Contestant	Age	Height	Title
Belarus	Andrei Charkas	23	1.82 m (5 ft 11 1/2 in)	
Belgium	Cédric Fievey	26	1.73 m (5 ft 8 in)	
Bulgaria	Radoslav Iliev	22	1.78 m (5 ft 10 in)	
Czech Republic	Martin Miko	23	1.92 m (6 ft 3 1/2 in)	
Denmark & Øresund	Mitchel Nebelong-Ibsen	20	1.80 m (5 ft 11 in)	
Estonia	Madis Räästas	28	1.80 m (5 ft 11 in)	
Germany	Dominic Meury	23	1.80 m (5 ft 11 in)	
Iceland	Magnus Jonsson	24	1.84 m (6 ft 1/2 in)	1st Runner-Up
Ireland	Jason Masterson	23	1.65 m (5 ft 5 in)	2nd Runner-Up
Italy	Antony Cortinovis	24	1.83 m (6 ft 0 in)	
Netherlands	Jeffrey Zevenbergen	27	1.90 m (6 ft 3 in)	
Northern Ireland	James Smallman	23	1.76 m (5 ft 9 1/2 in)	
Norway	Walter Heidkampf	49	1.84 m (6 ft 1/2 in)	
Palestine	Information redacted for security			
Poland	Kamil Szmerdt	21	1.75 m (5 ft 9 in)	
Portugal	André Caldeira Rodrigues	32	1.80 m (5 ft 11 in)	
Romania	Andy Claudiu Postica	22	1.80 m (5 ft 11 in)	
Russia	David Baramia	24	1.80 m (5 ft 11 in)	
Slovak Republic	Roman Vašek	21	1.78 m (5 ft 10 in)	
Slovenia	Robert Kulovec Mueller	29	1.82 m (5 ft 11 1/2 in)	
Spain	Sergio Lara	26	1.80 m (5 ft 11 in)	Mr Gay Europe 2009
Sweden	Mirza Muhic	28	1.82 m (5 ft 11 1/2 in)	
Switzerland	Ricco Müller	24	1.74 m (5 ft 8 1/2 in)	
Turkey	Halil Adem Said	25	1.78 m (5 ft 10 in)	

=== 2011 in Poiana Brașov ===
Country	Contestant	Age	Height	Title
Bulgaria	Stanislav Tanchev	36		
France	Guillaume Barbier	27	1.90 m (6 ft 3 in)	
Iceland	Simon Cramer Larsen	26	1.83 m (6 ft 0 in)	
Ireland	Barry Francis Gouldsbury	27	1.85 m (6 ft 1 in)	2nd Runner-Up
Italy	Giulio Spatola	26	1.75 m (5 ft 9 in)	Mr Gay Europe 2011
Norway	Snorre Andreassen	36		
Romania	Nicu Manea	32	1.72 m (5 ft 7 1/2 in)	
Russia	Ramin Ismailov	20	1.81 m (5 ft 11 1/2 in)	
Sweden	Christo Willesen	25	1.81 m (5 ft 11 1/2 in)	1st Runner-Up
Turkey	Aleydin Aliyev	22	1.69 m (5 ft 6 1/2 in)	

=== 2012 in Rome ===
Country	Contestant	Age	Height	Title
Austria	Joachim Trauner	29	1.81 m (5 ft 11 1/2 in)	
Belarus	Aleksandr Korik	24	1.76 m (5 ft 9 1/2 in)	
Bulgaria	Chavdar Arsov	25	1.76 m (5 ft 9 1/2 in)	
Cyprus	Kiri Spanos	24	1.84 m (6 ft 1/2 in)	
Czech Republic	Tomáš Frýda	24	1.78 m (5 ft 10 in)	
Denmark	Jobbe Joller	23	1.79 m (5 ft 10 1/2 in)	
Estonia	Vadim Firsa	22	1.70 m (5 ft 7 in)	
Finland	Janne Tiilikainen	26	1.75 m (5 ft 9 in)	
France	Remy Frejaville	31	1.78 m (5 ft 10 in)	
Germany	Chris Janik	35	1.78 m (5 ft 10 in)	
Greece	Argyrios Stelios Christakis	29	1.75 m (5 ft 9 in)	
Ireland	Steven Baitson	22	1.80 m (5 ft 11 in)	
Italy	Nicholas Menna	27	1.84 m (6 ft 1/2 in)	2nd Runner-Up
Malta	Steve Grech	31	1.78 m (5 ft 10 in)	1st Runner-Up
Northern Ireland	Daniel Hegarty	21	1.91 m (6 ft 3 in)	
Norway	Sebastian Okshovd	22	1.65 m (5 ft 5 in)	
Slovak Republic	Martin Lhota	21	1.68 m (5 ft 6 in)	
Spain	Miguel Ortiz	19	1.83 m (6 ft 0 in)	Mr Gay Europe 2012
Sweden	Erik da Silva	26	1.80 m (5 ft 11 in)	
Switzerland	Stephan Bitterlin	43	1.76 m (5 ft 9 1/2 in)	
Turkey	Denis Hamdi	25	1.76 m (5 ft 9 1/2 in)	

=== 2013 in Prague ===
Country	Contestant	Age	Height	Title
Austria	Patrick Santos	24	1.84 m (6 ft 1/2 in)	
Belgium	Tom Goris	34	1.83 m (6 ft 0 in)	
Bulgaria	Yanislav Pavlov	32	1.79 m (5 ft 10 1/2 in)	
Czech Republic	Marek Zly	34	1.80 m (5 ft 11 in)	
Denmark	Michael Sinan	35	1.81 m (5 ft 11 1/2 in)	
Finland	Aleks Vehkala	19	1.82 m (5 ft 11 1/2 in)	
France	Armando Santos	26	1.76 m (5 ft 9 1/2 in)	
Germany	Marcel Ohrner	30	1.78 m (5 ft 10 in)	
Ireland	Robbie O'Bara	26	1.89 m (6 ft 2 1/2 in)	Mr Gay Europe 2013
Italy	Alessio Cuvello	25	1.75 m (5 ft 9 in)	
Netherlands	Bobby de Vries	18	1.84 m (6 ft 1/2 in)	
Northern Ireland	Conor O’Kane	20	1.73 m (5 ft 8 in)	
Slovakia	Jozef Hulina	26	1.84 m (6 ft 1/2 in)	
Spain	Edgar Moreno	34	1.81 m (5 ft 11 1/2 in)	
Sweden	Fritiof Teodor Ingelhammar	20	1.87 m (6 ft 1 1/2 in)	2nd Runner-Up
Switzerland	Luis Bonfiglio	25	1.75 m (5 ft 9 in)	
United Kingdom	Leroy Williamson	28	1.87 m (6 ft 1 1/2 in)	1st Runner-Up

=== 2014 in Bregenz ===
Country	Contestant	Age	Height	Title
Austria	Robert Prolic	23	1.86 m (6 ft 1 in)	1st Runner-Up
Belgium	David Joest	34	1.87 m (6 ft 1 1/2 in)	
Bulgaria	Georgi Todorov	31	1.76 m (5 ft 9 1/2 in)	
Cyprus	Kiriakos Spanos	25	1.83 m (6 ft 0 in)	
Czech Republic	Michal	29		
Denmark	Christian-Sebastian	24	175	3rd Runner-Up
France	Olivier Croft	31	1.84 m (6 ft 1/2 in)	
Germany	Fabrice	22	1.84 m (6 ft 1/2 in)	
Ireland	Robbie Lawlor	23	1.81 m (5 ft 11 1/2 in)	
Lithuania	Minde	28	1.75 m (5 ft 9 in)	
Northern Ireland	Nick Flanagan	22	1.80 m (5 ft 11 in)	4th Runner-Up
Poland	Conrad Filas	26	1.83 m (6 ft 0 in)	
Sweden	Jack Johansson	20	1.79 m (5 ft 10 1/2 in)	Mr Gay Europe 2014
Switzerland	Max Escobar	28	1.75 m (5 ft 9 in)	
United Kingdom	Stuart Hatton Jr	29	170	2nd Runner-Up

=== 2016 in Oppdal ===
Country	Contestant	Age	Height	Title
Belgium	Raf Van Puymbroeck	21		Mr Gay Europe 2016
Bulgaria	Dimitar Dimitrov	33		
Czech Republic	Ladislav Agh	28		
Denmark	Danni Sigen	29		2nd Runner-Up
England	Joni Valadares	28		1st Runner-Up
Ireland	Konrad Im	27		
Poland	Andrzej Berg	27		
Slovak Republic	Marek Gajdos	25		
Spain	Sergio Diaz Rullo Brasero	26		
Wales	Paul Davies	32		

=== 2017 in Stockholm ===
Country	Contestant	Age	Height	Title
Belgium	Jaimie Deblieck	18	1.86 m (6 ft 1 in)	
Bulgaria	Yuksel Yuseinov	28	1.73 m (5 ft 8 in)	
Czech Republic	Daniel Fröhlich	23	1.83 m (6 ft 0 in)	
England	Matt Rood	37	1.72 m (5 ft 7 1/2 in)	Mr Gay Europe 2017
Finland	Rami Kiiskinen	20	1.78 m (5 ft 10 in)	
Germany	Niko Wirachman	27	1.78 m (5 ft 10 in)	
Ireland	Stephen Lehane	24	1.78 m (5 ft 10 in)	1st Runner-Up
Poland	Kacper Sobieralski	26	1.78 m (5 ft 10 in)	
Portugal	Joao de Oliveira	27	1.70 m (5 ft 7 in)	
Scotland	Steven Whyte	39	1.74 m (5 ft 8 1/2 in)	2nd Runner-Up
Wales	Ben Brown	28	1.82 m (5 ft 11 1/2 in)	

=== 2018 in Poznań ===
Country	Contestant	Age	Height	Title
Denmark	Niels Jansen	44	1.79 m (5 ft 10 1/2 in)	1st Runner-Up
England	Phillip Dzwonkiewicz	36	1.82 m (5 ft 11 1/2 in)	2nd Runner-Up
Germany	Enrique Doleschy	30	1.82 m (5 ft 11 1/2 in)	Mr Gay Europe 2018
Ireland	Guilherme Souza	25	1.83 m (6 ft 0 in)	
Poland	Karol Pacyna	22	1.79 m (5 ft 10 1/2 in)	
Ukraine	Dominik Svechnikov	20	1.78 m (5 ft 10 in)	
Wales	Christopher Price	26	1.94 m (6 ft 4 1/2 in)	

=== 2019 in Cologne ===
Country	Contestant	Age	Height	Title
Belgium	Matthias De Roover	26	1.80 m (5 ft 11 in)	1st Runner-Up
Bulgaria	Alexander Petrov	31	1.83 m (6 ft 0 in)	Mr Gay Europe 2019
Czech Republic	Lukáš Krajčo	26	1.88 m (6 ft 2 in)	
Finland	Konsta Nupponen	23	1.75 m (5 ft 9 in)	
Germany	Marcel Danner	30	1.80 m (5 ft 11 in)	2nd Runner-Up
Portugal	Mauro Melim	32	1.75 m (5 ft 9 in)	

=== 2022 in Alnwick Castle ===
Country	Contestant	Age	Height	Title
Czech Republic	Kevin Drábek	49	1.75 m (5 ft 9 in)	
England	Paul Dennison	37	1.98 m (6 ft 6 in)	Mr Gay Europe 2022
Italy	Andrea Pelone	32	1.73 m (5 ft 8 in)	1st Runner-Up
Ukraine	Dennis Zahnen	40	1.80 m (5 ft 11 in)	

=== 2023 in Alnwick Castle ===
Country	Contestant	Age	Height	Title
Belgium	Maarten Truijen	34	1.82 m (5 ft 11 1/2 in)	
Bulgaria	Gabriel Stoyanov	32	1.82 m (5 ft 11 1/2 in)	
Czech Republic	Kevin Drábek	50	1.75 m (5 ft 9 in)	1st Runner-Up
Germany	Chris Janik	46	1.76 m (5 ft 9 1/2 in)	
Great Britain	David Allwood	35	1.81 m (5 ft 11 1/2 in)	2nd Runner-Up
Ireland	Stephan LeHane	31	1.70 m (5 ft 7 in)	
Netherlands	Tim Küsters	28	1.80 m (5 ft 11 in)	Mr Gay Europe 2023
Norway	Nicolay Berge	27	1.73 m (5 ft 8 in)	
Spain	Ruben Carranza	35	1.71 m (5 ft 7 1/2 in)	

=== 2025 in Amsterdam ===
Country	Contestant	Age	Height	Title
Austria	Zsolt Baricz	28	1.82 m (5 ft 11 1/2 in)	
Belgium	Imran Nawaz	36	1.88 m (6 ft 2 in)	1st Runner-Up
Denmark	Archie Quezada	22	1.76 m (5 ft 9 1/2 in)	
Germany	Tobias Fibicher	31	1.80 m (5 ft 11 in)	
Great Britain	Andrew Gardiner	40	1.85 m (6 ft 1 in)	
Italy	Alessandro Scalisi	32	1.75 m (5 ft 9 in)	
Malta	Francisco Aros Sepulveda	36	1.85 m (6 ft 1 in)	
Netherlands	Kadeem van de Pol	28	1.79 m (5 ft 10 1/2 in)	2nd Runner-Up
Portugal	Angelo Amaro	34	1.81 m (5 ft 11 1/2 in)	
Spain	Edu Morales	24	1.92 m (6 ft 3 1/2 in)	
Sweden	Haris Eloy	32	1.84 m (6 ft 1/2 in)	
Switzerland	Michael Pereira	30	1.85 m (6 ft 1 in)	Mr Gay Europe 2025

== See also ==
- International Mister Gay
