= Olivia Arthur =

British photographer

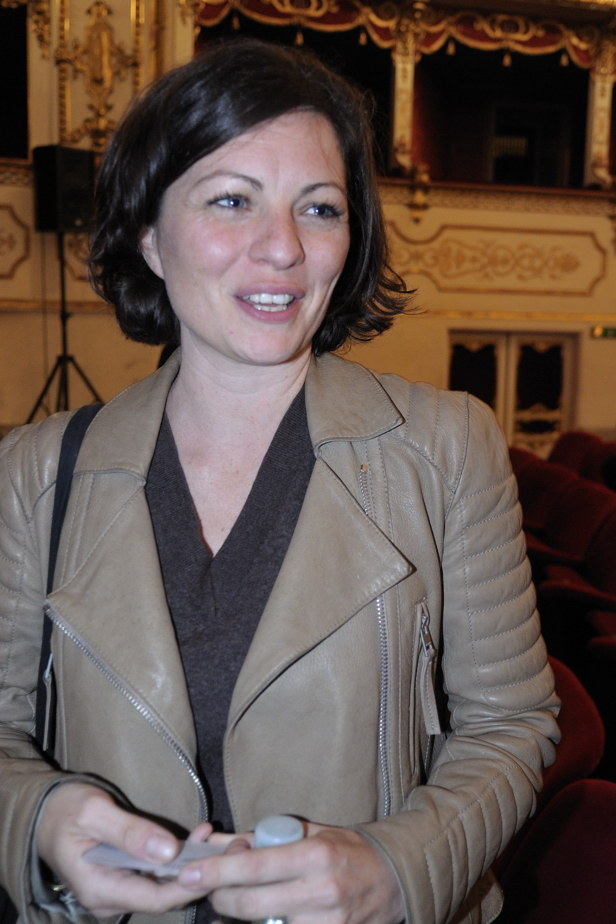
- Arthur in 2014
- Born: 1980 (age 45–46)
- Website: www.oliviaarthur.com

Olivia Arthur (born 1980) is a British documentary photographer, based in London. She is a member of the Magnum Photos agency and has produced the books Jeddah Diary (2012), Stranger (2015), and Murmurings of the Skin (2024).

== Life and work ==
Originally studying mathematics at Oxford University, Arthur later studied photojournalism at London College of Printing.

She became a nominee member of Magnum Photos in 2008, an associate member in 2011, and a full member in 2013. She was its president from 2020 to 2021.

In 2010 Arthur co-founded Fishbar, a publisher and space for photography in East London, with her husband Philipp Ebeling.

Her first book Jeddah Diary (2012) is about the lives of young women in Saudi Arabia. Her second book Stranger (2015) views Dubai through the eyes of the survivor of a shipwreck.

In 2022 Yves Saint Laurent and Magnum Photos collaborated with Arthur as part of an exhibition series called Self, which explores the spirit of the Parisian house. In 2022, Arthur's work was included in the exhibition curated by Charlotte Cotton, Close Enough: New Perspectives from 12 Women Photographers of Magnum, at the International Center of Photography in New York City from 27 September 2022 to 9 January 2023. The exhibition's title was inspired by Magnum co-founder Robert Capa's quote "If your pictures aren't good enough, you're not close enough," and includes projects from 12 living women Magnum Photos members.

== Publications ==
=== Books by Arthur ===
- Jeddah Diary. London: Fishbar, 2012. ISBN 978-0956995919. Edition of 1000 copies
- Stranger. London: Fishbar, 2015. ISBN 9780956995971. Edition of 1000 copies
- Murmurings of the Skin. Void, 2024.

=== Publications with contributions by Arthur ===
- Kurds: Through the Photographer's Lens. London: Trolley, 2008. ISBN 978-1-904563860.
- Unknown Quantities. London: Fishbar, 2012.
- Kitten Clone: Inside Alcatel-Lucent. London: Visual, 2014. ISBN 978-0-345814111.
- La premiere fois. Cinisello Balsamo, Milano: Silvana, 2017. ISBN 978-8-836636648.
- Magnum Manifesto. London: Thames & Hudson, 2017. ISBN 978-0-500544556.
- Home. Tokyo: Magnum Photos Tokyo, 2018. ISBN 978-4-9909806-0-3.

== Group exhibitions ==
- Sound of Harris, by Arthur and Philipp Ebeling, Leica Studio, London, 2015
- Home, an exhibition of the work of Magnum Photos photographers, curated by Pauline Vermare; New York and six other cities worldwide, beginning in March 2018
- La premiere fois, exhibition of the work of Magnum Photos photographers, held within the Brescia Photo Festival 2017, Museo di Santa Giulia, Brescia, Italy, March–September 2017
- Close Enough: New Perspectives from 12 Women Photographers of Magnum, International Center of Photography, New York, 29 September 2022 – 9 January 2023
