= Metro India =

English-language daily broadsheet newspaper

- Cover of Metro India on 6 February 2016
- Type: Daily newspaper
- Format: Broadsheet
- Owner: C. L. Rajam
- Editor-in-chief: C. L. Rajam
- Founded: 2013
- Political alignment: Centrist
- Language: English
- Headquarters: Hyderabad; India
- Circulation: Telangana

Metro India is an English-language daily newspaper being published in Hyderabad, Telangana. It is available in the Indian State of Telangana.

== History ==
The newspaper was founded in 2013 by CL Rajam who previously launched a Telugu daily newspaper, Namasthe Telangana. After the formation of Telangana State, he bequeathed Namasthe Telangana and started the daily under Intercontinental Digital Pvt ltd.

== Editions ==
The news paper publishes editions for Hyderabad, Warangal, Khammam, Nizamabad, Nalgonda, Karimnagar, Mahabubnagar and other parts of Telangana.
