= Gaylaxy (magazine) =

Indian LGBT magazine

- Editor: Sukhdeep Singh Sachin Jain (Hindi)
- Categories: LGBTQ+
- Frequency: Bi-monthly
- Founder: Sukhdeep Singh
- First issue: 10 January 2010
- Country: India
- Language: English, Hindi
- Website: www.gaylaxymag.com

Gaylaxy is an Indian lesbian, gay, bisexual and transgender (LGBT) magazine. The magazine is based in Kolkata.

== History and development ==
Gaylaxy was founded by Sukhdeep Singh. In 2010, Singh was still an eighth semester BTech student at the Indian School of Mines in Dhanbad. Singh is the current editor-in-chief and is also a gay rights activist in India. The initial team consisted mostly of the editor's close friends and contacts. The first issue was published in January 2010, after India's "high court overturned a law that criminalized homosexuality." The second issue of the magazine saw the launch of the website. Later, in 2013 this law was again reinstated, making being in a same sex relationship in India illegal again.

After the Indian Supreme Court's decision effectively re-criminalising LGBTIQ citizens in December 2013, a dedicated Hindi section of Gaylaxy magazine was created with an inaugural issue of eight articles. Sachin Jain joined forces with Sukhdeep as he wanted to positively and constructively channel his anger and frustration at disparaging descriptions of the community as "a minuscule minority with so called rights", rooted in the misconception that the indigenous queer movement is an elitist product of Westernisation, liberalisation and globalisation.

Gaylaxy also released an app on 14 February 2014 relating to the website and its content. The application is maintained by Apurv Gupta. In their effort towards going mobile, the website was also made available on news reading application called "Plash". The Gaylaxy app is considered a "possible first for the gay community" in India, according to The Times of India.

== Publication and content ==
Gaylaxy was originally distributed as a monthly magazine. From 2011 to 2013, it was a bi-monthly publication, distributed online free of cost. But from 2014, Gaylaxy is available only as a website and discontinued its pdf issues.

The magazine claims to have a worldwide readership, with nearly 60% from India, followed by United States, UK, Pakistan and Canada. The magazine has contributors from all parts of India, including Pakistan. It has covered a wide variety of issues pertaining to LGBT in India.

The content is generally made up of:

- A cover story highlighting in detail various LGBT issues in the country.
- LGBT news from India and around the world, details of film festivals, pride festivals, interviews.
- Relationship advice, movie reviews, literature, fiction and poems sent in by readers, sexual health and safety, and tarot readings.
- Personal articles sent by people about their opinions, lives and coming out.

Each issue of Gaylaxy also carries a list of NGOs across India working for LGBT issues with their contact details. It has covered issues from all around the world including the anti-gay bills in Uganda and Russia, California Proposition 8 and LGBT rights in Pakistan. The magazine also publishes regular news articles on its websites about LGBT events in India.

== Events ==
Gaylaxy has been organizing various seminars, events, ceremonies, workshops, awareness sessions for the community and at colleges as well.

- In October 2016, it organized an event called " Breaking the Closet " wherein many activists including Gautam Yadav, Rituparna Borah, Anwesh Sahoo, Sharif D Rangnekar, and several people from the audience shared their coming out stories and the connotations of " closet ".
- It supported the pride march organized by Indian Institute of Technology Delhi and University of Delhi students where Sukhdeep Singh spoke about coming out.
- In November 2016, it organized " Queer Carnival " where people from the LGBTQ+ community showcased their talent in singing, dancing, poetry etc.
- It organized a workshop on Gender, Sexuality and Power in Presidency University, Kolkata on 15 December, through practical hands – on exercises and interactive sessions.The workshop involved a journey through multiple exercises and interactive sessions to break down the stigma and silence the concerns issues related to Gender and Sexuality on campuses.

== Works ==
Gaylaxy Hindi has published a total of 185 works by 53 contributors since 1 January 2014. The magazine has published an Indo-Pak gay love story called 'Zero Line' by a queer writer Hadi Hussain Bhatt from Lahore, reporting on issues and achievements of both Pakistani and Bangladeshi LGBTIQ movements, development of relationships based on trust with closeted individuals in the heartland and encouraging them to express themselves. Gaylaxy also interviewed Xulhaz Manan a few days before he was murdered, along with his friend and fellow-activist Mahbub Rabbi Tonoy, by Islamic extremists in Bangladesh. In 2015, Sachin was invited to speak about our work with Gaylaxy Hindi at the Queer Asia Conference at the Society of Oriental and African Studies in London. In 2016, his article on Hindi queer writing, "(Not) His Master's Voice" was also published in an anthology about Indian urban queer spaces called "Queer Potli".

== Awards and recognitions ==
Sukhdeep Singh, for his work on Gaylaxy and significant involvement and leadership in LGBT communities, was conferred with January Marie Lapuz Youth Leadership Award on 1 January 2017 by the South Asian queer organization Sher Vancouver.

== See also ==
- LGBT rights in India
- Homosexuality in India
- LGBT themes in Hindu mythology
- LGBT culture in India
