= Gaysi =

Online space for queer Desis

- Website: http://gaysifamily.com

The Gaysi (Gay Desi) family is an online space and E-zine for queer Desis based in Mumbai.

== History ==
A website for gay Desis across the world, it began in November 2008 by MJ and Broom when they realized that India had a scarcity of quality online queer content. “The aim was to make you feel like you’re not the only one. The coming out process for any individual is never easy. After all, it is family and society one has to come out to,” says MJ. The idea behind Gaysi Family was to provide a platform for queers. Today, the website features opinions, personal stories, fiction, erotica, news about LGBT developments in India and across the world, book and film reviews. Some of the popular topics include ‘Coming Out’, ‘Aam Gaysi interviews’, ‘Homophobia’ and IPC 377.

== Publication and content ==
Gaysi Family provides a platform for the LGBT community from the Indian Subcontinent to express their views, share their coming out stories, poems, erotic fiction, book reviews, movie reviews or event notices. Additionally, they also interview popular queers and straight allies. A new section called the "Writer's Bloc" was launched, which hopes to translate diverse queer literature from Indian regional languages into English and vice versa.

In 2013, Gaysi Family launched its queer journal called The Gaysi Zine, a magazine dedicated to curating content about what it means to be gay and desi {=Gaysi}—gender or labels notwithstanding. The magazine was launched on 28 November at the lawns of Goethe-Institut, Max Mueller Bhavan, New Delhi. The panel included Parvati Sharma, who is the author of "The Dead Camel and Other Stories of Love", Arunava Sinha, who is the translator of classic, modern and contemporary Bengali fiction and nonfiction in English. Pramada Menon, who is the co-founder of CREA, and now consultant on gender and sexuality, Priya, the Editor of The Gaysi Zine and co-director of The Gaysi Family, and Antara Datta, a lecturer of English Literature at Delhi University.

They also sponsored a video titled "Happy in Gaysi Land" featuring famous gay activist Harish Iyer. The video showcases Indian queers dancing happily to the tune of "Happy" by Pharrell Williams, after the events of Indian's ban on same-sex relations. Shot over a 48-hour period, the video features Indian LGBT residents dancing all over Mumbai in an effort to engage in "a different form of activism."
