= LGBTQ culture in Vienna =

Vienna, the capital of Austria, has an active LGBTQIA+ community. Vienna is considered Austria's queer capital, with several LGBTQIA+ spaces, organisations and a history of LGBTQIA+ activism going back to the late 19th century.

== History of LGBT culture of Vienna ==
=== Late 19th century and early 20th century ===
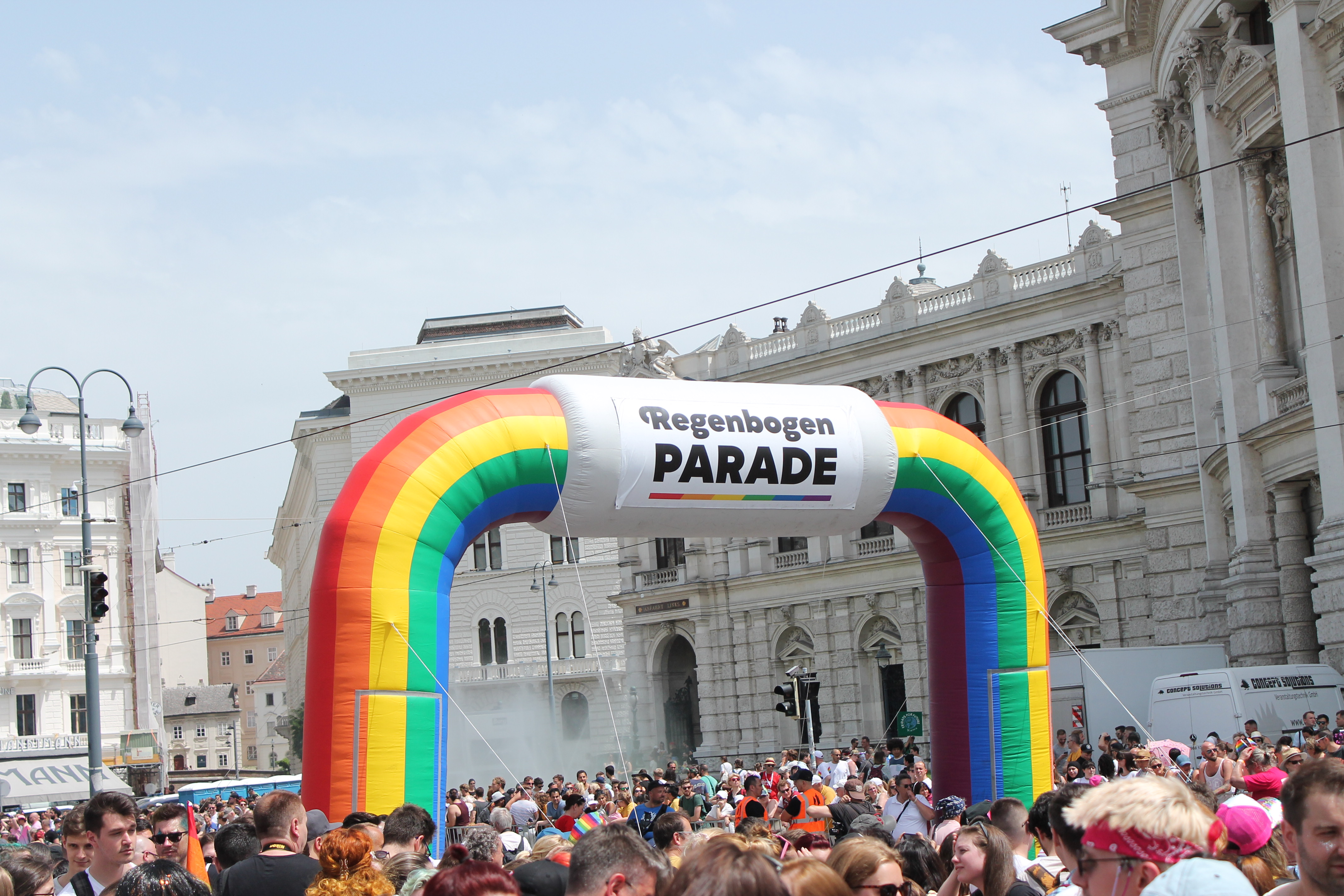
Vienna Pride in 2019

Vienna was an important city for progressive thinkers and researchers around sexuality in the late 19th century. Austrian-Hungarian activist and author Karl Maria Kertbeny, who coined the terms homosexuality and heterosexuality, was socialized in the Viennese arts scene. Psychialist Richard von Krafft-Ebing, who was an influence on Magnus Hirschfeld's activities in Berlin, was active in Vienna. Eugen Steinach was important in developing the first sex reassignment surgery, also with Hirschfeld.

Vienna had a vibrant gay and lesbian culture in the Interwar period during the time of Red Vienna, when the Social Democratic Party had unilateral control of the city. LGBT people were criminalised, but still several LGBT spaces existed. An example in literature is Grete von Urbanitzky who was a Viennese-based author. In 1927, she published her novel Der Wilde Garten that dealt with theme of lesbian love. The novel was later censored and burned by the Nazis in 1935.

In 1930, Vienna hosted the Weltliga für Sexualreform, a conference around progressive approaches to sexuality founded by queer activist and researcher Magnus Hirschfeld, with 2000 people participating.

=== Vienna during National Socialism ===
Laws against gay and lesbians were strengthened after the Austria annexion to Germany in 1938, which had a devastating effect on the LGBT culture of the city. Both men and women were prosecuted. Men could be sent into concentration camps and forced labor. Women, while less targeted, could also be sent to camps for "asocial" behavior. As homosexuality was still illegal after the war, it was difficult for queer people to be recognized as victims. The book The Men with the Pink Triangles about Viennese concentration camp survivor Josef Kohout's is one of the most important documents of gay persecution during National Socialism.

=== 1960s-1980s : New movements ===
After the decriminalisation of homosexuality in 1971, in the late 1970s and early 1980s, the queer movement started being more and more active in Vienna. In January 1980, HOSI Wien was founded as the first queer organisation in Austria, first only run by gay men, from 1981 on together with lesbian women. Activists around HOSI Wien organised the first gay pride of Vienna taking place in 1982 and a protest for the lack of recognition of gay and lesbian victims of National Socialism that took place in 1988.

The squatting scene became an important part of the queer movement of the city in the early 1980s. This part of the movement criticized HOSI Wien for being too inefficient in their approach. In 1982, queer activists occupied an empty building in the 5th district and turned it into the LGBT center Rosa Lila Villa. Activists from Rosa Lila Villa staged a nude protest during the New Year's concert at Wiener Musikverein in 1982, demanding gay liberation.

=== The AIDS crisis ===
The first wave of the AIDS epidemic in Vienna started in 1983 and at this time there were already a lot of victims. Reinhard Brandstater, the vicepresident of the hospital, reached out to three experts: Cristian Kunz, director of virology of the University of Vienna, Klaus Wolff, director of the first university dermatological clinical, and Alois Stacher, the city counsellor for public health. When they decided to publish an informative brochure on AIDS, the city council covered all the costs and helped for its distribution. This city was the first one in Europe to do so.

== Geography ==
The Naschmarkt area in Vienna, that connects the 4th and the 6th district of the city, is a gay village. In this area one can find mainly gay bars, clubs and gay saunas.

== Demographics ==
According to some estimates, around 5-10% of Vienna's population identify as LGBT+ (90.000 to 180.000 people).

== Politics ==
=== Queerphobia in Vienna ===
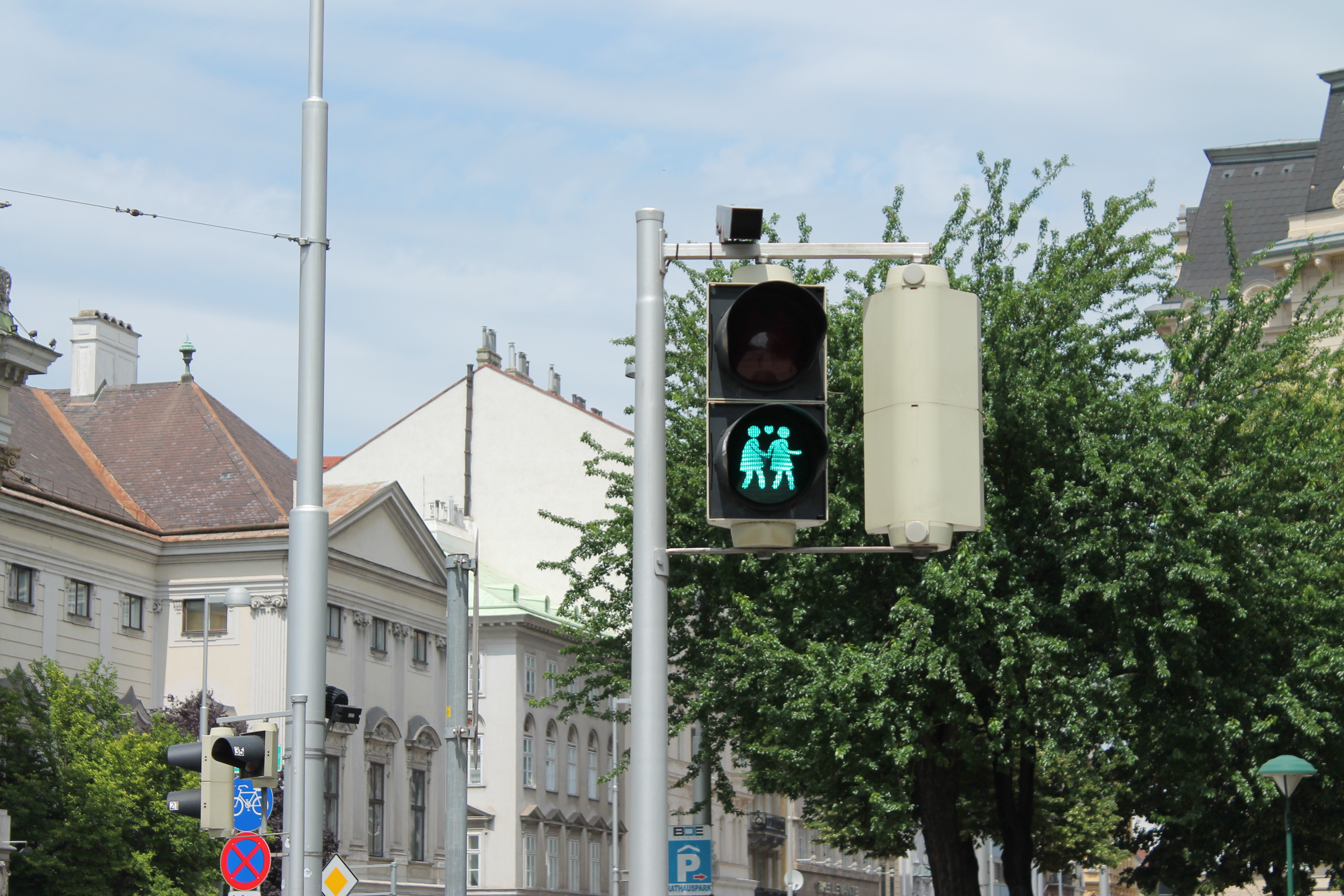
Same-sex traffic lights in Vienna

Queerphobia in Vienna was quite prominent years ago due to laws related to the criminalisation of homosexuality. Nowadays, Vienna can be considered as a relatively safe city for queer people. However, there are still some prominent homophobic and queerphobic attacks. The Austrian Green MEP Ulrike Lunacek was a victim of an acid attack during a Pride parade in Vienna. And in 2015, a Lesbian couple was thrown out of traditional coffeehouse Café Prückel for kissing in public, which led to a protest with over 1000 attendees.

=== City politics ===
Vienna has traditionally been more progressive than the rest of Austria. Some first anti-discrimination laws were passed in 1996 and 1997, and activism already had garnered the support of then-mayor Gertrude Fröhlich-Sandner as early as 1982, when homosexuality was still not supported politically widely in the country. In 1998, the city established the Viennese Anti-Discrimination Unit for Gay, Lesbian and transgender issues (Wiener Antidiskriminierungsstelle), which works with a five-year action plan. The purpose was to bring up LGBT topics into all the different levels of administration, but also to mainstream LGBT issues among the Viennese public.

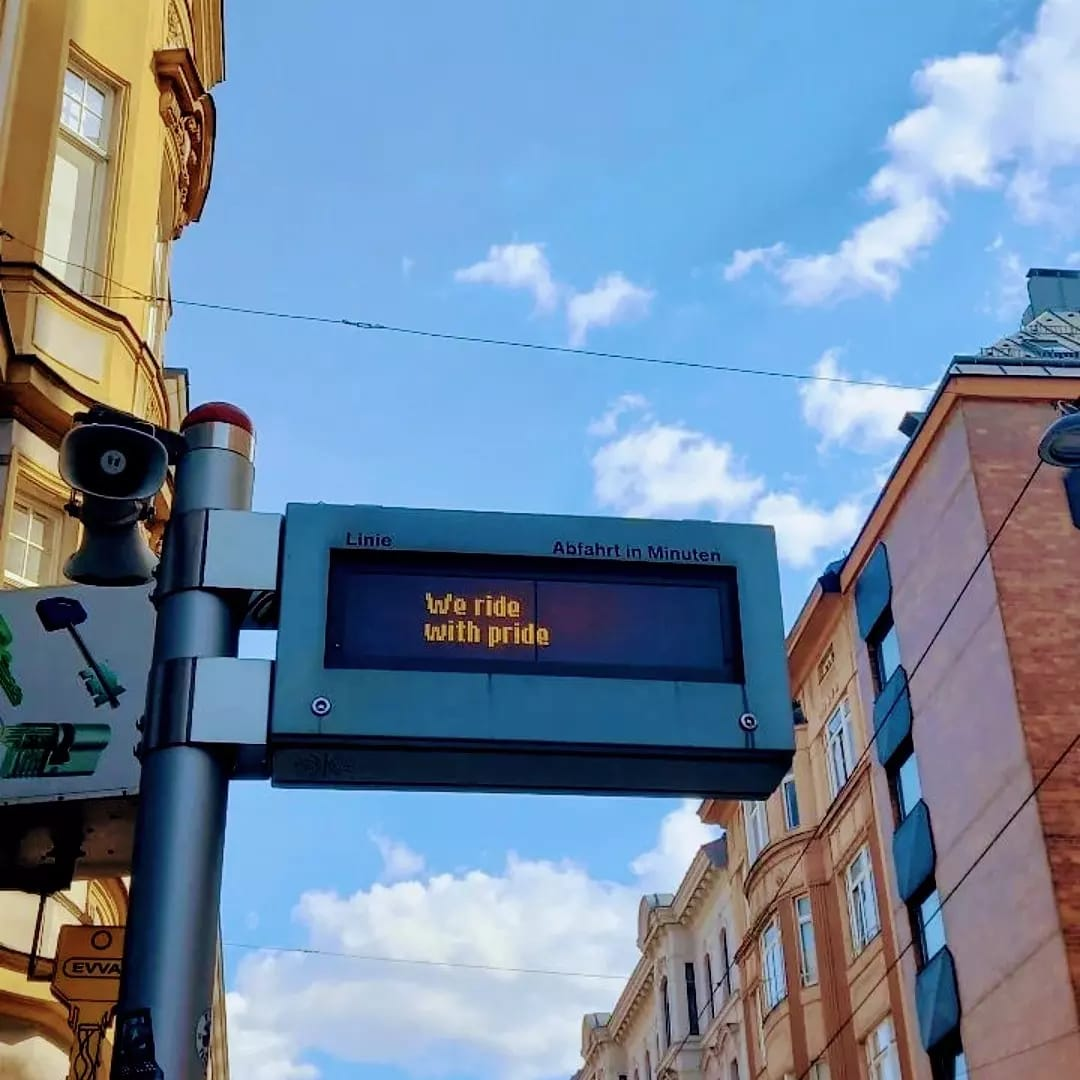
Tram Boards displaying the text "We ride with pride" on Pride Day throughout Vienna, June 2022

The city has introduced rainbow crossings, rainbow benches, the flagging of public buildings and pedestrian crossing symbols. The city transport including trams and subways can be seen displaying rainbow flags and supportive messages such as "We ride with Pride" during the Pride Month. In 2015, the city of Vienna introduced traffic lights with same-sex couples before hosting the Eurovision Song Contest that year, which attracted media attention internationally. The official website of Vienna city has a guide for LGBT+ visitors with detailed information about the city's queer and queer-friendly spaces.

In 2016, the city of Vienna started handing out honorary awards to LGBT activists: Helmut Graupner received the Ehrenzeichen für Verdienste um das Land Wien award in 2016.

The city has a memorial for gay concentration camp survivors, most notably Josef Kohout, situated in Heinz-Heger-Park. There is also a monument to the victims of persecution of homosexuals in the Nazi era in Resselpark.

In December 2014, Vienna joined the Rainbow Cities Network by declaring itself a Human Rights City. Vienna became a fast-track city in the fight against HIV/AIDS in June 2017.

== Institutions and Media ==
=== LGBT associations ===
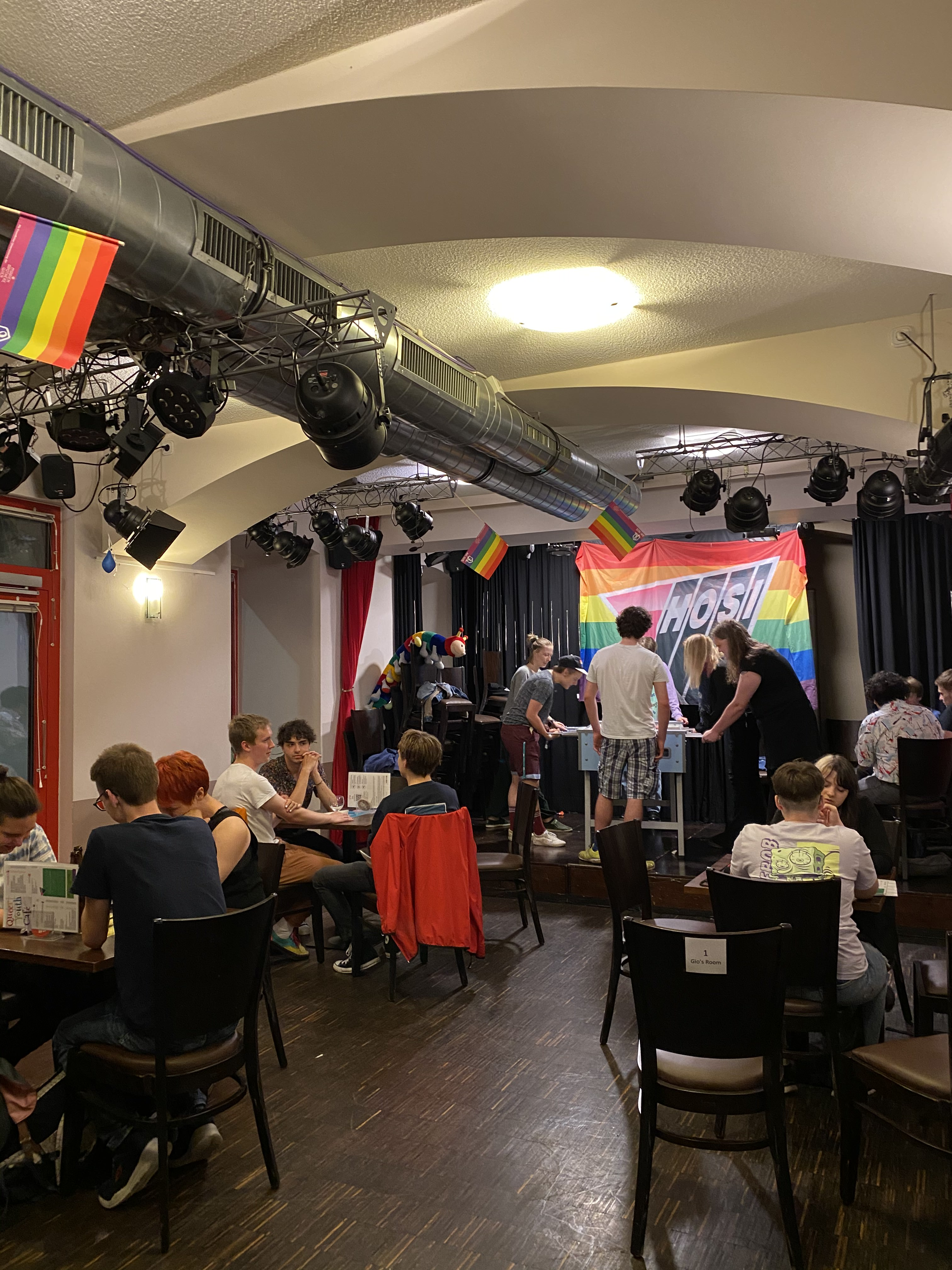
Youth event by HOSI Wien in August 2021

==== HOSI Wien ====
HOSI Wien (Homosexual Initiative Vienna) is the oldest Austrian Lesbian and Gay organization, founded in 1979. They work on lesbian and gay issues through political lobbying as well offering support to lesbians and gays through the coming out process and in case of discrimination.

==== Trans X ====
TransX is an Austrian organization located in Vienna which focuses on the rights of trans people and who understand transitioning as fluid. They organize excursions, workshops, festivals and work on political actions and legal lobbying. The organization also operates on special-interest-issues with the goal of creating programs which appeal to everyone within the community. Within their political and legal activism, the organization started a number of initiatives. For example, the First European Transgender council on Civil and Political Rights and a petition for a free chose of one's first name, which was signed by more than three thousand people.

==== FAmOS Rainbow Families ====
FAmOS Rainbow Families is an association that supports, represents the interests of families and children. It helps create networks of families within the Austrian Rainbow concept, which includes all people who identify with the LGBTQIA+ movement. They work on networking, raising awareness in society, and compliance with equal rights. Also, they organise meetings to share topics related to fertility, fears, pregnancy, bureaucratic support, etc. They founded the Network of European Associations of LGBT Families (NELFA) and are members of the International Association of Lesbians, Gays, Bisexuals, Trans and Intersexuals (ILGA Europe). Additionally, they organized the International Day of Family Equality 2022, the publication of a commemorative magazine of its 10 years. They have created a self-help group for "trans and trans" parents who want to have children, have organized different counselling and support workshops.

=== Health institutions ===
Even if in Vienna everyone has the same legal right to access healthcare, LGBT people might still face discrimination. In order to fight against that, some associations have been created to give access to healthcare for LGBT people.

- AIDS-Hilfe, a non-profit association that seeks to reduce the number oh HIV infections and to help infected people to live with the diseases.
- Diversity Care Wien, a support organization for people with HIV that provide home-car for older and disabled people. This association is recognized by the Vienna Social Fund, and benefits from facilities provided by the City of Vienna.
- Schalk und Pichler, a medical office specialized in fighting HIV and other STIs that are more common in homosexuals communities.

=== Media ===
==== Vangardist ====
Vangardist is a progressive queer magazine based in Vienna. In 2015, a special HIV edition was published aimed at raising awareness about the virus. In order to help break the stigma surrounding HIV, the ink used to print the magazine was mixed with blood pigments of three HIV positive blood donors. The aim was to convey that it is as safe to make physical contact with an HIV+ person as it is to touch that magazine edition. The edition managed to reach more than 40 million people through media coverage and the idea won international awards.

== Recreation and culture ==
=== Film festivals ===
Vienna is home to a number of queer film festivals. The most important between 1994 and 2017 was Identities Queer Film Festival, which took place bi-annually. It was founded by Barbara Reumüller under the association DV8-Film and was part of Viennale, Vienna's biggest film festival, from 1996 to 2001. Filmcasino, a cinema in the 5th district, was one of its primary venues. Identities came to an end in 2017 due to lack of funding.

After Identities was discontinued, Gabi Frimberger, then head of the FrauenFilmTag Wien, Dagmar Fink, and Katja Wiederspahn in 2019 decided to create Queertactics - Queer_Feminist Film Festival. The festival takes place annually at Le Studio and Admiralkino.

The Transition International Queer & Minorities Festival has a focus on minorities within the queer community. It was founded in 2012 by Yavuz Kurtulmus and was formerly known as the “internationale queere migrantische filmtage” (English: international queer migrant film days).

=== Cruising ===
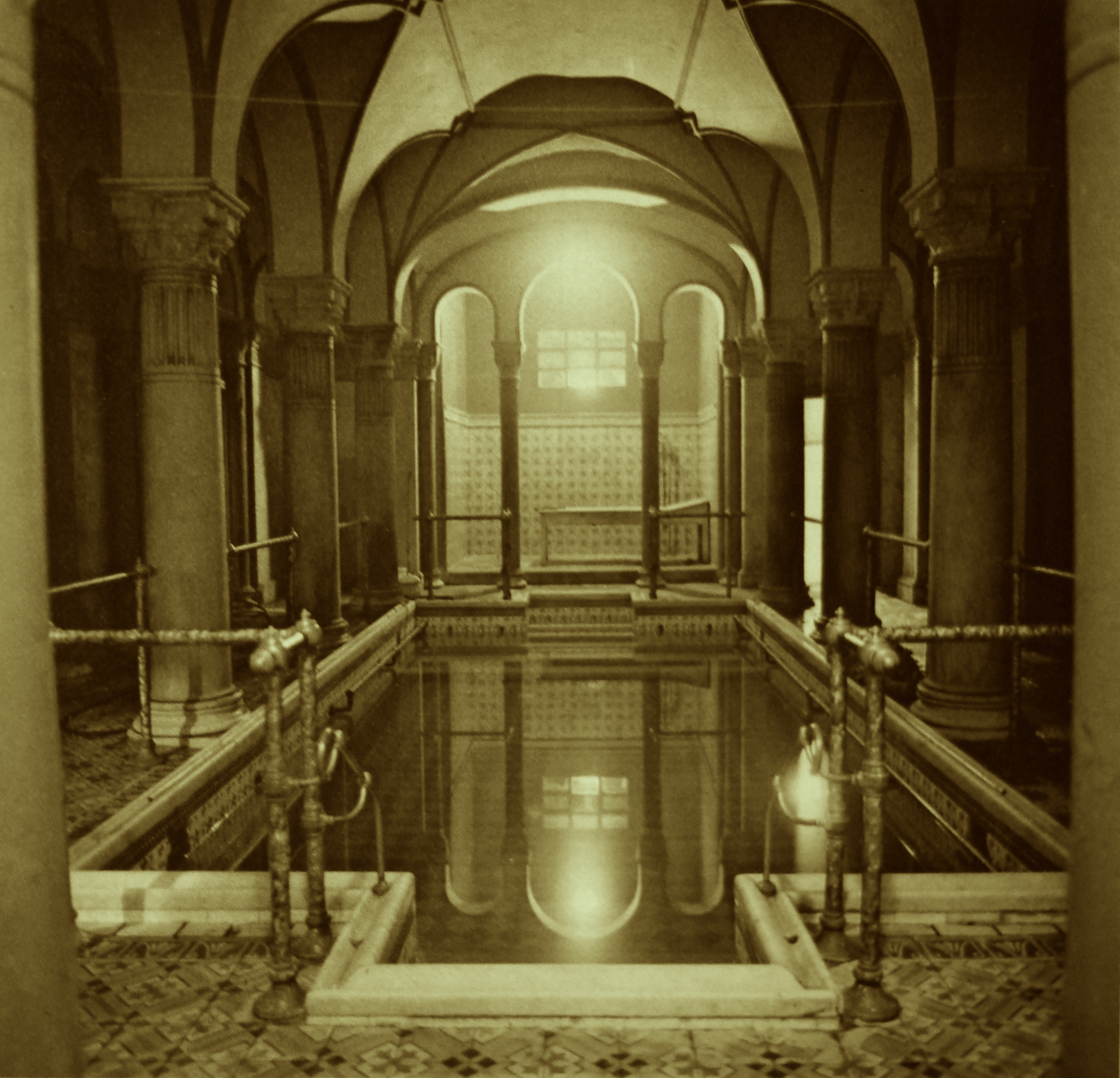
Central Bathhouse Vienna in 1889

Vienna has several cruising spots. The Central Bathhouse Vienna was regularly frequented by Archduke Ludwig Viktor of Austria, whose homosexuality was an open secret, and is now the city's most important gay sauna. Rathauspark right by the City Hall used to be a popular meeting spot for gay men. Toter Grund on the Danube Island and Dechantlacke are two nudist beaches frequented by gay men along the Danube.

=== Cafés and nightlife ===
The biggest amount of LGBT cafés, bars and restaurants is in the 6th district. Of these, the oldest one is Café Savoy. It was opened in 1896 and eventually became a point of attraction among LGBT community and tourists. Other bars in the area include Village, Das Gugg (run by HOSI Wien), Villa Vida (run by Rosa Lila Villa), Café Willendorf, Mango Bar and Marea Alta. Why not is a club that hosts theme parties and drag shows.

Café Flinte was founded in 1977 by a feminist collective and is run by Lesbian women, targeting a female and trans audience.

Regular parties in 2022 include Männer im Garten at Volksgarten Pavillon, Rhinoplasty at Club-U (since 2007) and G-Spot.

=== Queer music scene ===
UNRECORDS is a queer-feminist record label founded in 2012 in Vienna. The label's aim is to support experimental/noise/punk/rock music in a queer-feminist context.

Vienna-based collectives working with electronic music, sound art and queer activism include Sounds Queer? and Fibrig. They share knowledge and tools and they believe that music can create a safer space to exchange experiences and express yourself. They organise workshops, collective jams, performances and shows.

The 60th Eurovision Song Contest was held in May 2015 in Vienna after drag queen Conchita Wurst had won the contest the previous year. The event took place in Wiener Stadthalle.

In April 2022, the 4th Symposium of the LGBTQ+ Music Study Group took place in University of Music and Performing Arts Vienna.

== Events and protests ==
=== Parades ===
Every year in June Vienna Pride takes place in the first district of the city. Starting in front of the town hall, the parade follows the Ringstraße, past important historical and political buildings. Vienna Pride has taken place continuously since 1996. In 2022, according to the organizers 250.000 people were part of the parade fighting for the rights and for visibility of queer people.

Vienna hosted EuroPride in 2001 and in 2019. The latter was attended by an estimated 500.000 people.

=== Balls and festivals ===
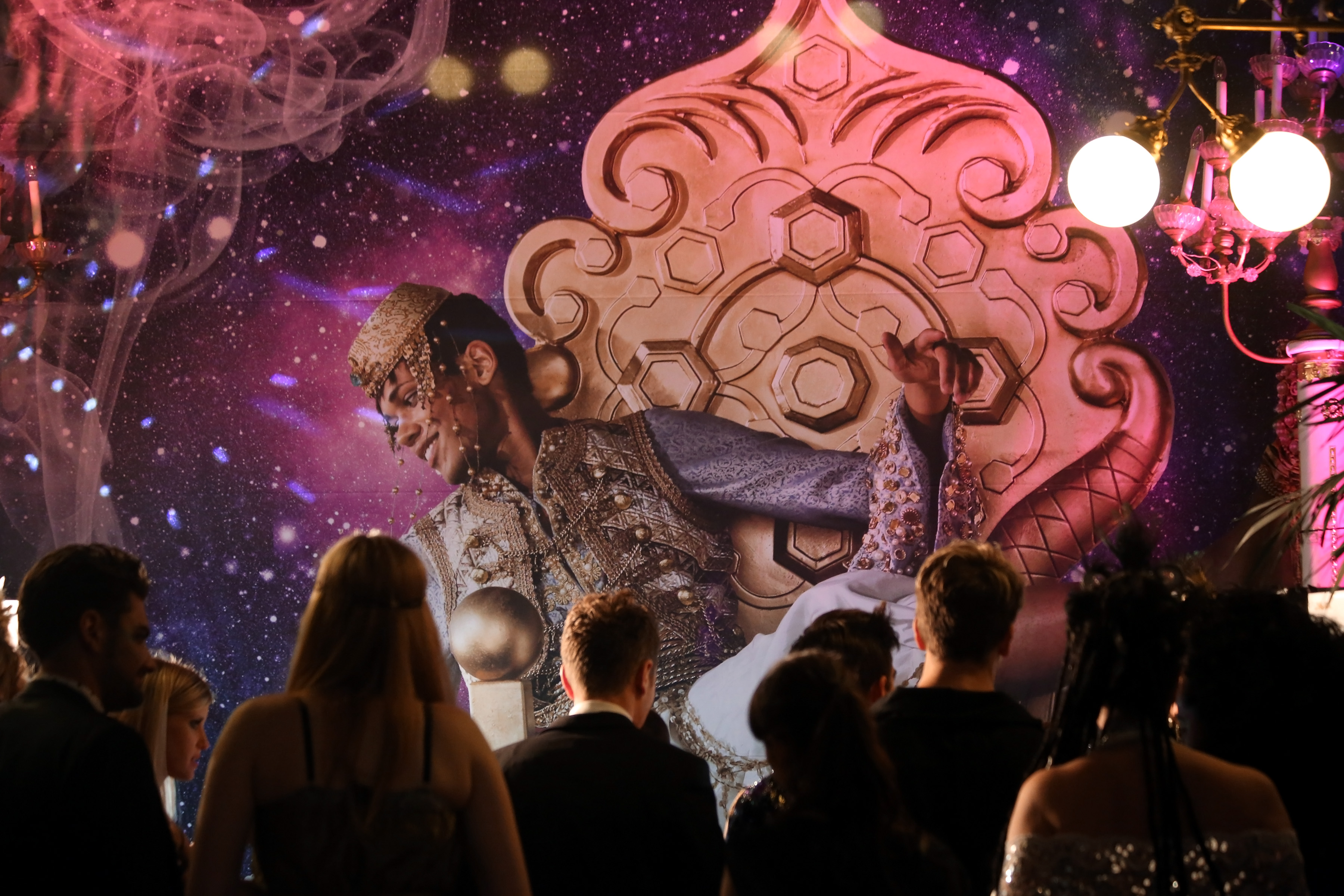
Life Ball in 2013

The Regenbogenball takes place in Vienna once a year. It is hosted by the HOSI Wien. After a break of 3 years caused by COVID-19 the Regenbogenball took place at a hotel in Schönbrunn in May 2022. The aim of the Rainbow Ball is to celebrate diversity, to fight against discrimination of any kind and to promote acceptance of queer people.

The Life Ball in Vienna is the biggest charity event in Europe supporting people with HIV or AIDS. The event is organized by the nonprofit organization AIDS LIFE, which was founded in 1992 by Gery Keszler and Torgom Petrosian. The Diversity Ball was launched in 2008 by Monika Haider, founder of equalizent Schulungs- und Beratungs GmbH.

In 2021, the Rosa Lila Villa organised the Queer Feminist Festival, abbreviated QF². The goal was to provide a platform for queer artists and entrepreneurs and took part in front of the Rosa Lila villa.
