= Adolescence, Sexuality, and the Criminal Law =

2005 book

- Author: Vern Bullough and Helmut Graupner
- Language: English
- Publisher: Routledge
- Publication date: 2005
- Pages: 200
- ISBN: 978-0789027818

Adolescence, Sexuality, and the Criminal Law: Multidisciplinary Perspectives is a book edited by Vern Bullough and Helmut Graupner. It was published by Routledge in 2005.

The book consists of earlier papers written by participants of a 2002 IATSO conference, which Bullough and Graupner organized in response to the European Commission's 2001 draft of the Framework Decision on Combating the Sexual Exploitation of Children and Child Pornography. The decision was enacted in 2004. Chapter contributors include Bullough, Graupner, Lorenz Böllinger, Michael C. Baurmann, Lilian Hofmeister, Thomas Moebius, Bruce Rind and David Weiss.
