= Ljubljana Pride =

Annual LGBTIQ march in Ljubljana, Slovenia

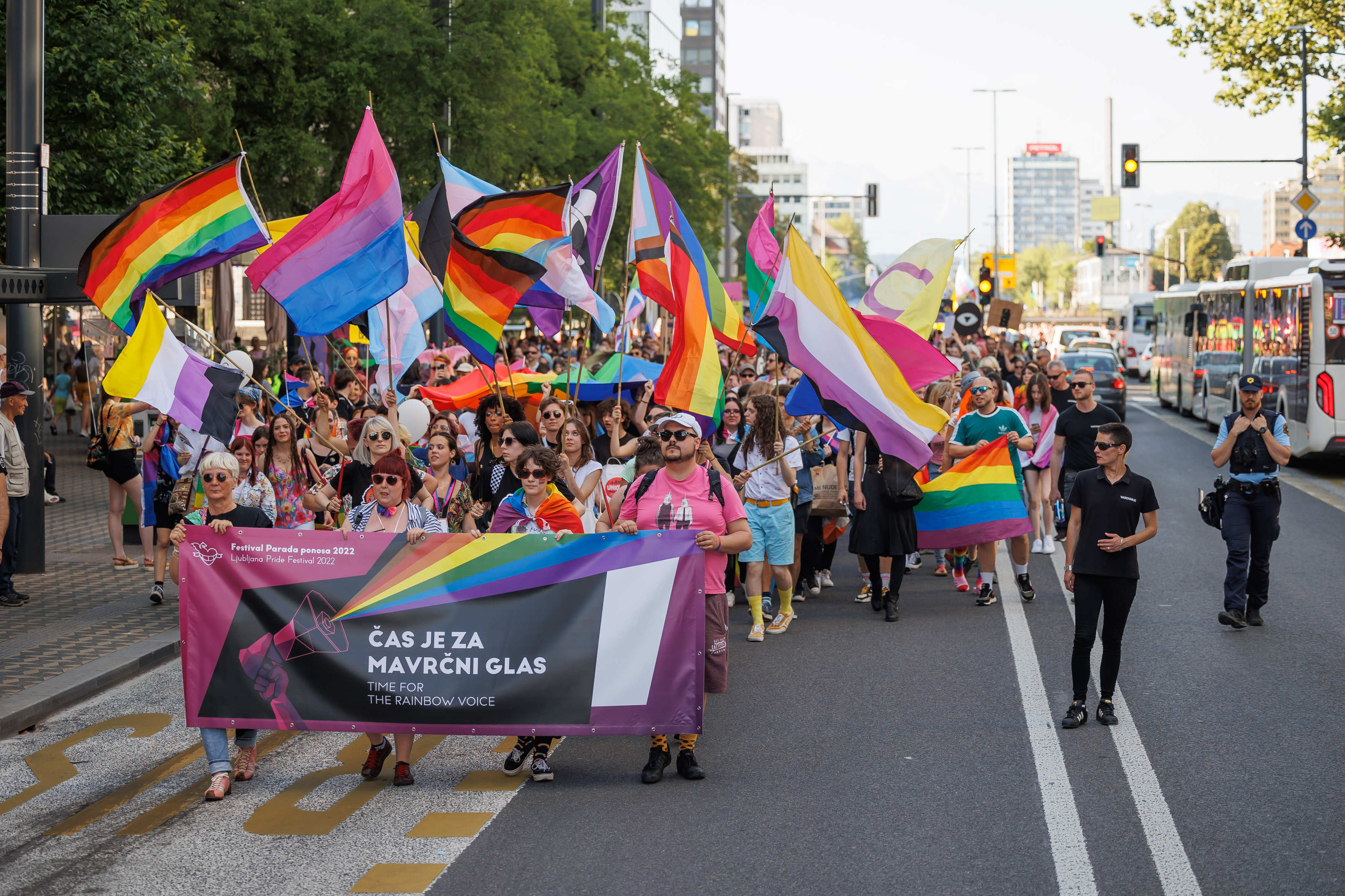
Ljubljana Pride 2022

Ljubljana Pride is the annual Slovenian national LGBTIQ pride march, held in its capital of Ljubljana each June. The name also refers to the week of LGBT-related events that are held in the city prior to the march. It is organized by the Pride Parade Society and strongly supported by the City of Ljubljana (a member of Rainbow Cities Network).

== History ==
The first pride march was organized in 2001 as a reaction to the impatient and insulting behavior of the staff towards Brane Mozetič and Canadian poet Jean-Paul Daoust in front of the Ljubljana City Gallery. The Pride Parade then became an annual event.

In 2009 several organizers of the event were attacked during an event at a cafe in the week prior to the march; one activist, Mitja Blažič, was hospitalized. Amnesty International released a statement calling on Slovenian authorities to condemn the incident and ensure that the Pride event could go on safely.

As of 2010, the event had not needed to deal with large numbers of counter protesters.

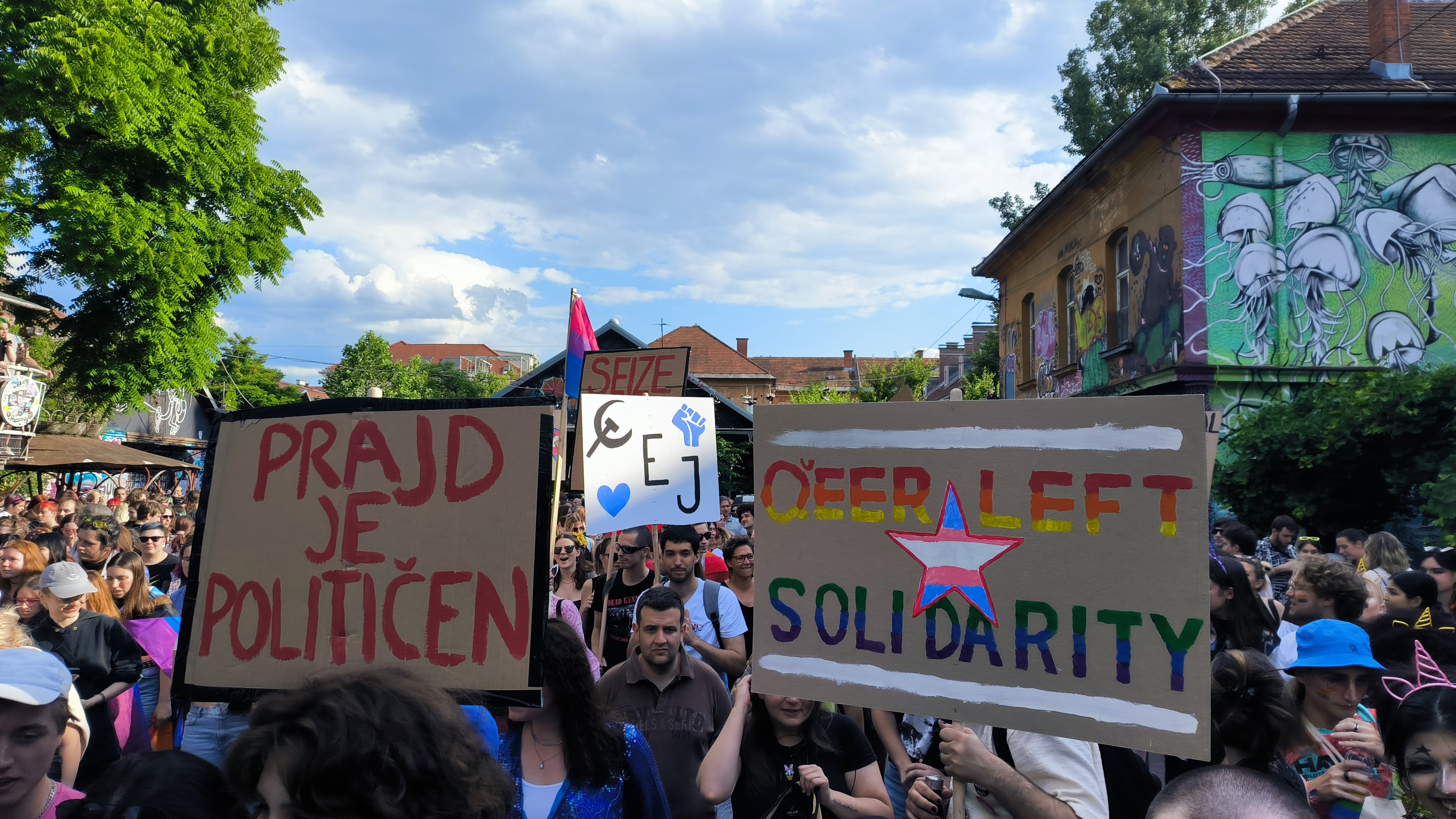
Ljubljana Pride 2023 march gathering at Metelkova

The most recent Ljubljana Pride, on June 17, 2023, attracted a crowd of 3,500 according to organizers. This was also the first time the event was addressed by the current head of state; president Nataša Pirc Musar described it as “an expression of the fight for human dignity. It is a protest with the clear message that every human being, regardless of their sexual orientation, sexual identity or sexual expression is worthy of respect, love and equal treatment”. Labour Minister Luka Mesec, and Minister for a Solidarity-Based Future Simon Maljevac, Slovenia's first openly gay member of government, also attended. During and after the parade, attendees faced threats, violence, insults, flag burnings, and destruction of private property. A Katja Sešek, a representative of the Pride Parade Association, told Radio Slovenia that there had not been such hostility for years. Mitja Blažič, a long-time activist and previous victim of similar attacks, highlighted the multiple instances of violence, homophobia, and transphobia during the Pride Parade as unprecedented and unsettling.

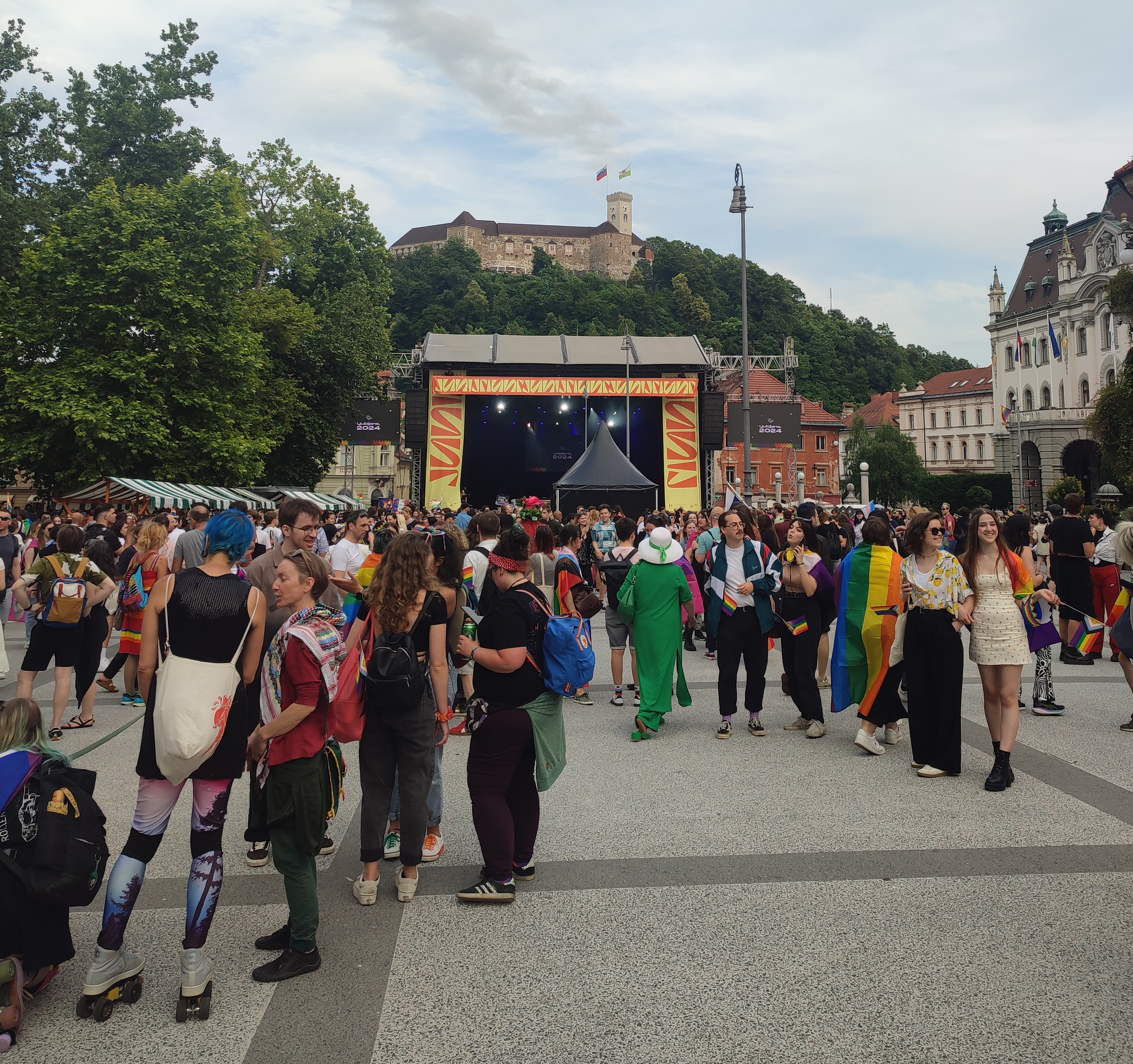
Ljubljana Pride 2024 main stage on the main square of Ljubljana

== See also ==
- LGBT rights in Slovenia
