= Disappearance of Aeryn Gillern =

Austrian disappearance case

Aeryn Gillern
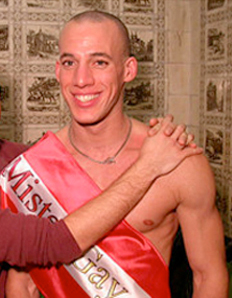
- Gillern as Austrian Mister Gay 2006
- Born: Aeryn M. J. Gillern; April 28, 1973; Elmira, New York
- Disappeared: October 29, 2007; Stephansplatz, Vienna
- Status: Missing for 19 years and 1 day
- Mother: Kathryn Gilleran

Aeryn Michael John Gillern disappeared in Vienna on the evening of Monday, October 29, 2007. At the time, Gillern was working for UNIDO.

== Biography ==
Aeryn Gillern was born on April 28, 1973, in Elmira, New York, the son of Kathryn Gilleran (born 1952). Kathryn named Aeryn after the sun god in Czech mythology. In June 1991 he graduated from Groton High School in Groton, New York. In 1997, Gillern graduated the Franciscan University of Steubenville (Ohio) with a Bachelor of Arts degree in theology. From 1997 to 1998, Gillern attended the seminary at Graz-Seckau (Austria). In 1999, Gillern received a Master of Arts with honors in Theology and Christian Ministry from Franciscan University of Steubenville. In 2003 he was appointed by United Nations Industrial Development Organization (UNIDO) in Vienna (Austria) as a research assistant. In 2006, he was named Mr. Gay Austria.

In September 2007, he flew home to his mother, Kathryn Gilleran, in Cortland, New York, to visit his family for ten days. His mother was planning to sell their house and move to Vienna to be with her son. On October 27, 2007, Kathy phoned her son and talked to him for the last time. He disappeared from Stephansplatz, Austria two days later.

== Disappearance ==
His mother received a call on Halloween 2007 that Aeryn was missing. It was believed by Austrian police that he was last seen running naked from the Kaiserbründl sauna in Weihburggasse after an assumed physical altercation where one person allegedly went to the hospital although his last confirmed location was a sauna on Stephansplatz after work. Police have asserted that he may have been suicidal and jumped to his death in the Danube, a hypothesis Gillern's acquaintances do not believe; others, including his mother, argue that the investigation into his disappearance was hampered by police bias against Gillern's sexuality. The Austrian police changed their statement multiple times, as well as denying the presence of any witnesses, despite a phone call they had received from a couple only a day after Gillern was declared missing. The Austrian police initially refused to investigate the case, saying it was not its duty to investigate the disappearance of non-citizens, and refused to interview Aeryn's mother or any of Aeryn's friends after the investigation was finally launched under pressure from the United Nations and the Austrian Foreign Ministry.

== Aftermath ==
Each year since 2008, Gillern's mother has held a vigil every October 29 outside the Kaiserbründl to commemorate the disappearance of her son. The 2011 documentary Gone: The Disappearance of Aeryn Gillern, which debuted at that year's Tribeca Film Festival, is dedicated to his mother's search for the truth behind her son's disappearance.

== See also ==
- List of people who disappeared mysteriously (2000–present)
