= Lilian Hofmeister =

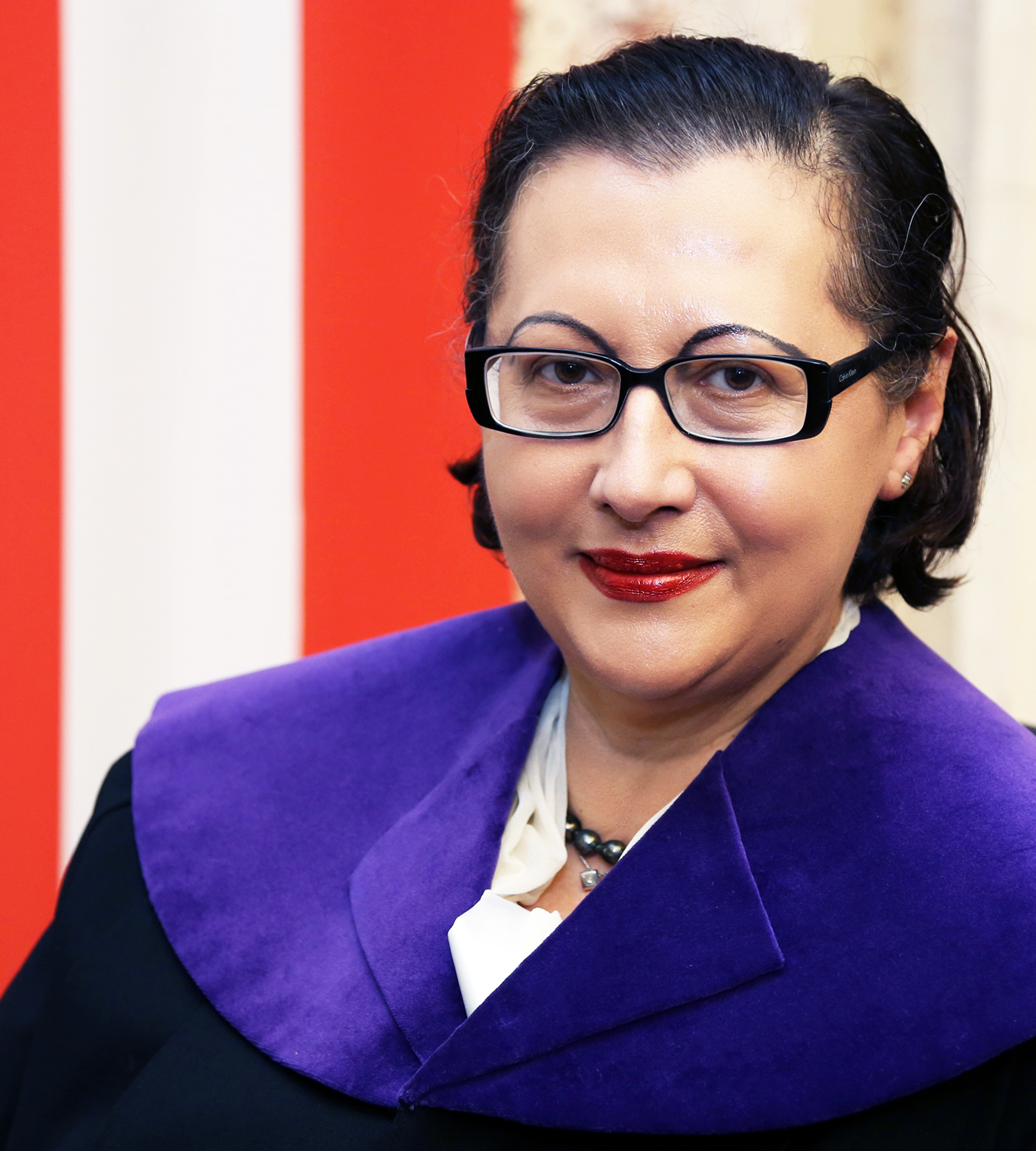
- Lilian Hofmeister (2012)

Substitute Justice at the Austrian Constitutional Court
- In office 1998–2020

Lilian Hofmeister (born October 16, 1950) is a leading Austrian expert in the field of advancement of women's rights, women's access to justice and in particular elimination of discrimination against women. She worked as a judge in Austria for more than 30 years and has served as Substitute Justice at the Austrian Constitutional Court since 1998.

On June 26, 2014, Justice Hofmeister was elected as one of 12 members of the Committee on the Elimination of All Forms of Discrimination against Women (CEDAW), replacing those members whose four-year term was to expire at the end of 2014. Comprising 23 independent experts, the Committee monitors the implementation of the UN Convention on the Elimination of All Forms of Discrimination against Women by State parties. From 1976 to 2010 Justice Hofmeister worked as a judge, mainly at the Commercial Court in Vienna, where she started to actively address challenges regarding discrimination against women in daily life and in particular in their access to justice.

== Legal expert ==
In 1995 she served as legal expert and member of the Austrian Delegation at the 4th UN World Conference on Women in Beijing. From 1996 to 2003 Justice Hofmeister served as Chairwoman of the Working Group on Equal Treatment (Austrian Ministry of Justice). In 1996 Justice Hofmeister served as rapporteur on the topic of access to justice for women in the framework of the Council of Europe's activities on the promotion of equality between women and men.

== Founding member ==
Since 1997, she is a Founding Member of the Austrian National Committee for UN Women (Former National UNIFEM), which is one of the 17 national non-governmental organizations supporting the mission of UN Women worldwide through their public awareness initiatives about global women's issues and their fundraising efforts. In 2010, 2013 and 2014 Justice Hofmeister was a member of the Austrian delegation during the annual sessions of the UN Commission of the Status of Women (CSW) in New York.

== Chairwoman ==
Since 1998, she is the Chairwoman and founder of the Austrian Women Judges Association (AWJA), a non-governmental organization of Austrian female judges dedicated to fight discrimination against women and to launch educational programs on women's rights.

From 2010 to 2012, Justice Hofmeister was the Chairwoman of the Austrian Association for the Access of Women to Justice, an independent association supporting female complainers in court procedures aiming at the clarification of women-oriented legal questions. Justice Hofmeister holds a Doctor of Law Degree from the University of Vienna. In addition to her teaching activities on the topic of women's rights, human rights and justice at several academic institutions (e.g. University of Vienna, University of Linz, Renner Institute, Rosa Mayreder College) she has published a number of scientific papers on women's human rights and women's access to justice from a practitioner's perspective.

== Selected works ==
- Hofmeister, Lilian (2013). Die kurze Geschichte der Juristinnen in der österreichischen Justiz (The short history of female jurists within the Austrian justice system), in: Pilgermair, Walter (ed.), Wandel der Justiz (Change within the justice system), Verlag Österreich: Vienna. ISBN 9783704665317 (Link)
- Hofmeister, Lilian (2004). 14 to 18 Year Olds as "Children" by Law? Reflections on Developments in National and European Law, in: Bullough, Vern L. and Graupner, Helmut (eds.), Adolescence, Sexuality, and the Criminal Law: Multidisciplinary Perspectives, The Haworth Press: New York, pp. 63–70, ISBN 978-0-7890-2781-8 (Link)
- Hofmeister, Lilian (1995). Women's Rights are Human Rights - Utopian Vision or (Realistic) Demand?, in: Publication of the Austrian Ministry of Women's Affairs and the Austrian Federal Chancellery, Vienna - Beijing - Vienna: World Conference on Women 1995.
