= Rosa Lila Villa =

Austrian LGBT centre

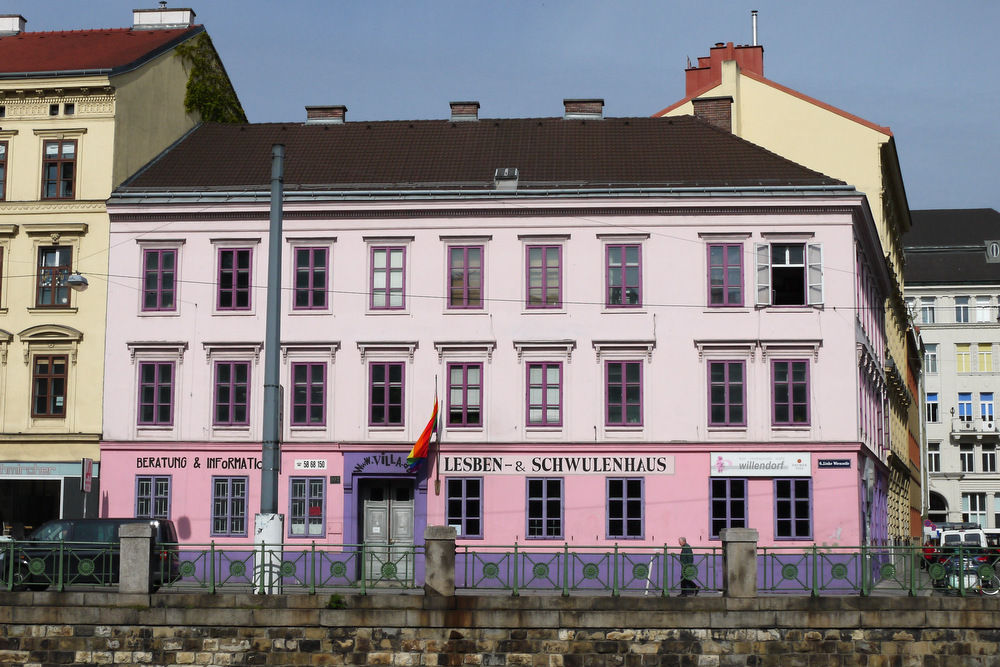
The Türkis Rosa Lila Villa from outside.

Rosa Lila Villa is an Austrian LGBT center situated in the Linke Wienzeile Buildings neighbourhood of Vienna. It is designed as a housing project, restaurant, event and counseling venue for LGBT people in Austria.

== History ==
The initiative to found the Villa comes from the squatter scene of the late 1970s and 80s and from the early lesbian and gay movement. The house, which was scheduled for demolition, was squatted in 1982. After long negotiations with the owner and the deputy mayor of Vienna Gertrude Fröhlich-Sandner, who supported the project, a contract was signed in 1984 for a 30-year lease, even though homosexuality was still illegal in the country.

The building was renovated with one part dedicated to a center for counseling homosexual and transgender people, and one part to communal apartments and catering. The organization behind the Rosa Lila Villa worked on LGBT rights in Austria, among other things by working on education about HIV/AIDS.

In 2016, the organisation opened a spin-off in the house that focused on LGBTIQ refugees, named Queer Base. On the same year, the house was vandalized with a graffiti that said "Kill gays" (Tötet Schwule). In 2017, queer Base received the Bruno Kreisky Prize for Services to Human Rights and the Alexander Friedmann Prize.

In 2019, the restaurant was renamed to Villa Vida. The Villa is divided between the Lila Tip for lesbian counseling and the Türkis Rosa Tippp for transgender, gay and queer counseling.
