= Analyse & Kritik (academic journal) =

- Discipline: Philosophy and Social science
- Language: English
- Edited by: Michael Baurmann, Julian Culp, Anton Leist, Ulf Tranow

Publication details
- History: 1979–present
- Publisher: De Gruyter (Germany)
- Frequency: Biannual
- Open access: Hybrid

Standard abbreviations
- ISO 4: Anal. Krit.

Indexing
- ISSN: 0171-5860 (print); 2365-9858 (web)
- OCLC no.: 7985313

Links
- Journal homepage

Analyse & Kritik: Journal of Philosophy and Social Theory is a hybrid open access biannual peer-reviewed academic journal published by De Gruyter Oldenbourg on behalf of the Institut für Sozialwissenschaften, Heinrich-Heine-Universität Düsseldorf, Germany, devoted to the fundamental issues of empirical and normative social theory. Publishing articles in English, this journal aims to promote the dialogue between Anglo-American and Continental traditions in the social sciences and ethics.

== Abstracting and indexing ==
The journal is abstracted and indexed in:

- EBSCO databases
- International Bibliography of Periodical Literature
- Mir@bel
- ProQuest databases
- Scopus
