= Helmut Graupner =

Austrian lawyer and LGBT rights activist

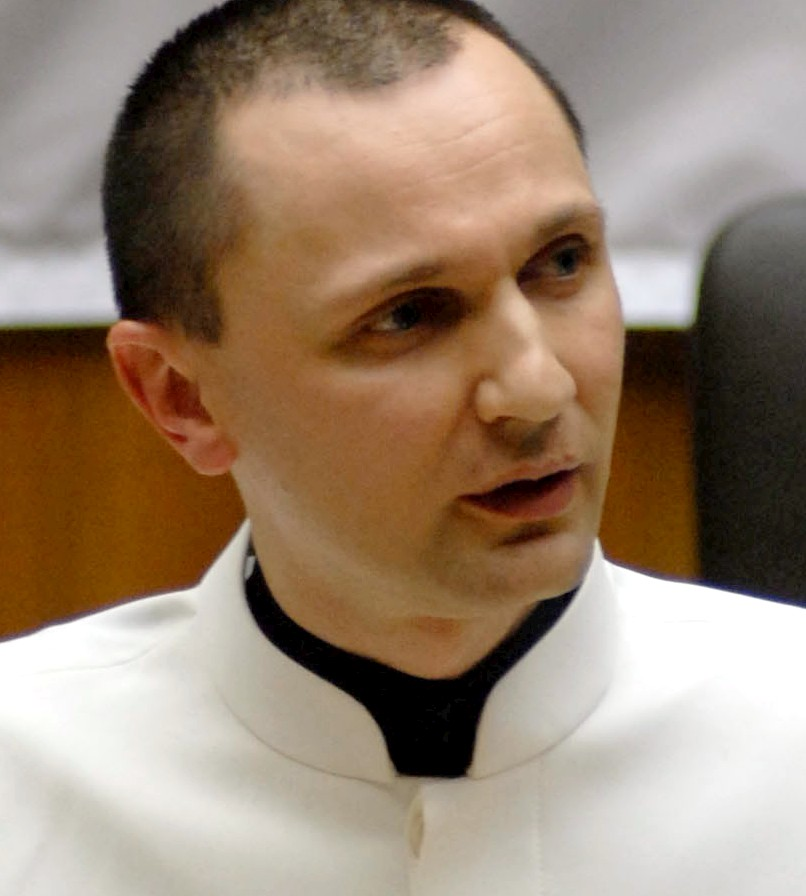
Graupner presenting to Austrian Parliament, 2006.

Helmut Graupner is a lawyer in Vienna, considered a leading advocate in LGBT European rights. He has been president of the Rechtskomitee Lambda since its foundation in 1991.

From 2005, he has been the Austrian representative on the European Commission on Sexual Orientation Law (ECSOL). Graupner co-edited the 2005 book Adolescence, Sexuality, and the Criminal Law with Vern Bullough.

In 2016, Graupner was awarded the Decoration of Merit, the highest honor awarded by the state of Vienna.

In 2017, Graupner pursued a case for the rights of five same-sex families that resulted in Austria's highest court ruling that banning same-sex couples from marriage was discriminatory. The first same-sex marriage in Austria was for Graupner's clients in December 2018, with same-sex marriage available to the general public at the start of 2019.
