= Central Bathhouse Vienna =

Bathing facility in Vienna, opened 1889

Coordinates: 48°12′21″N 16°22′29″E

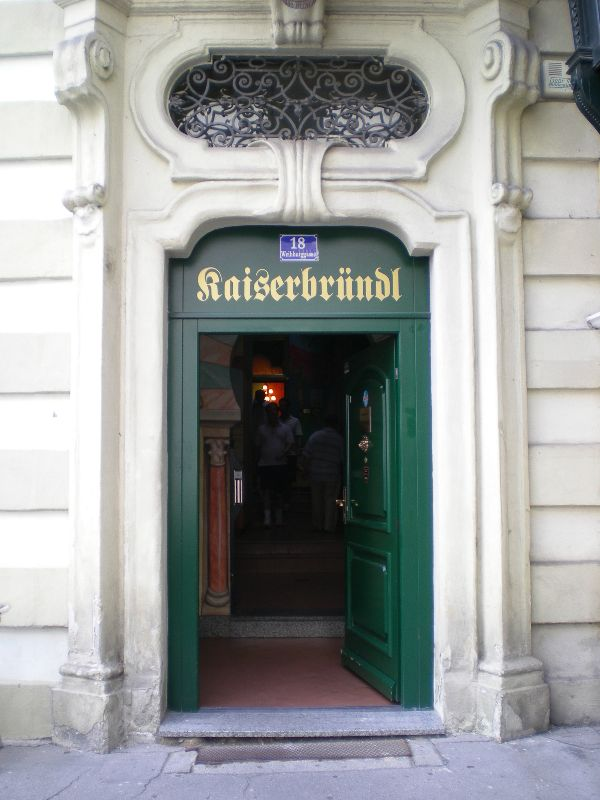
Kaiserbründl-Sauna in the Central-Bad

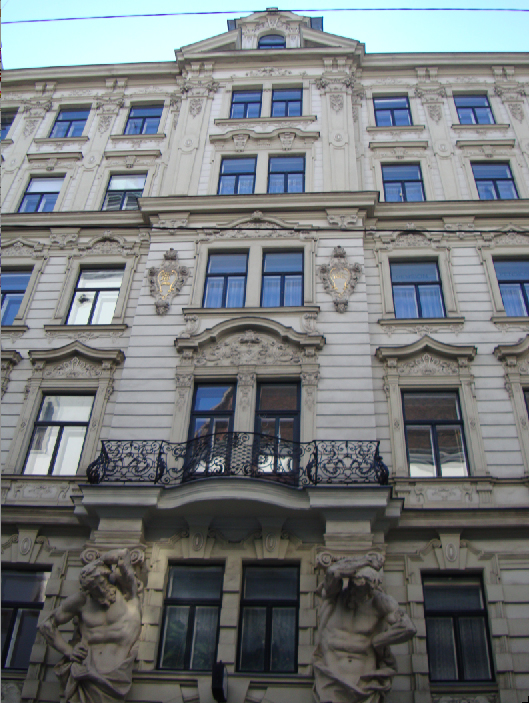
Weihburg-Gasse 18-20

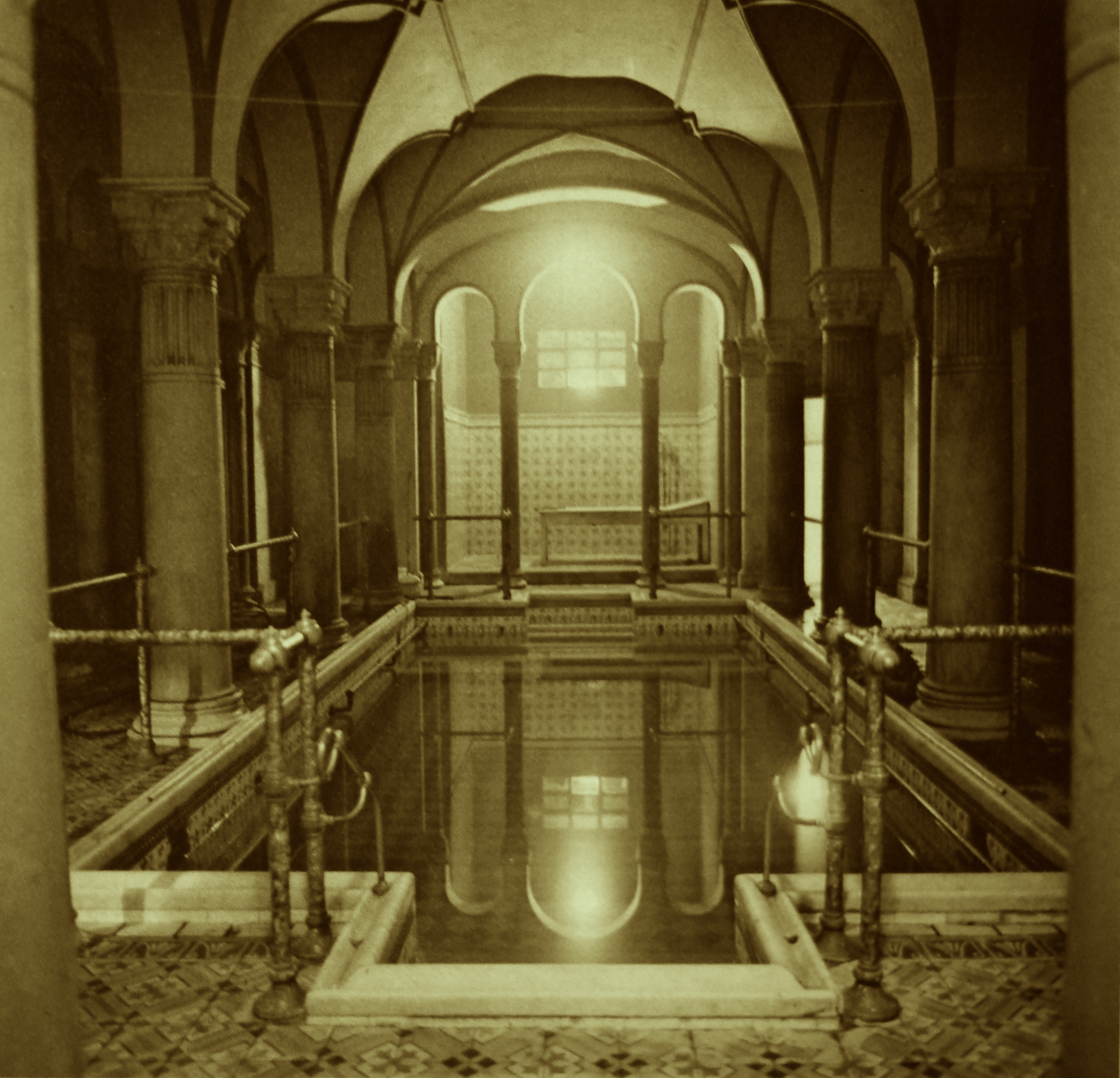
Pool for men in the Central Bathhouse 1889; old advertising brochure (c. 1910)

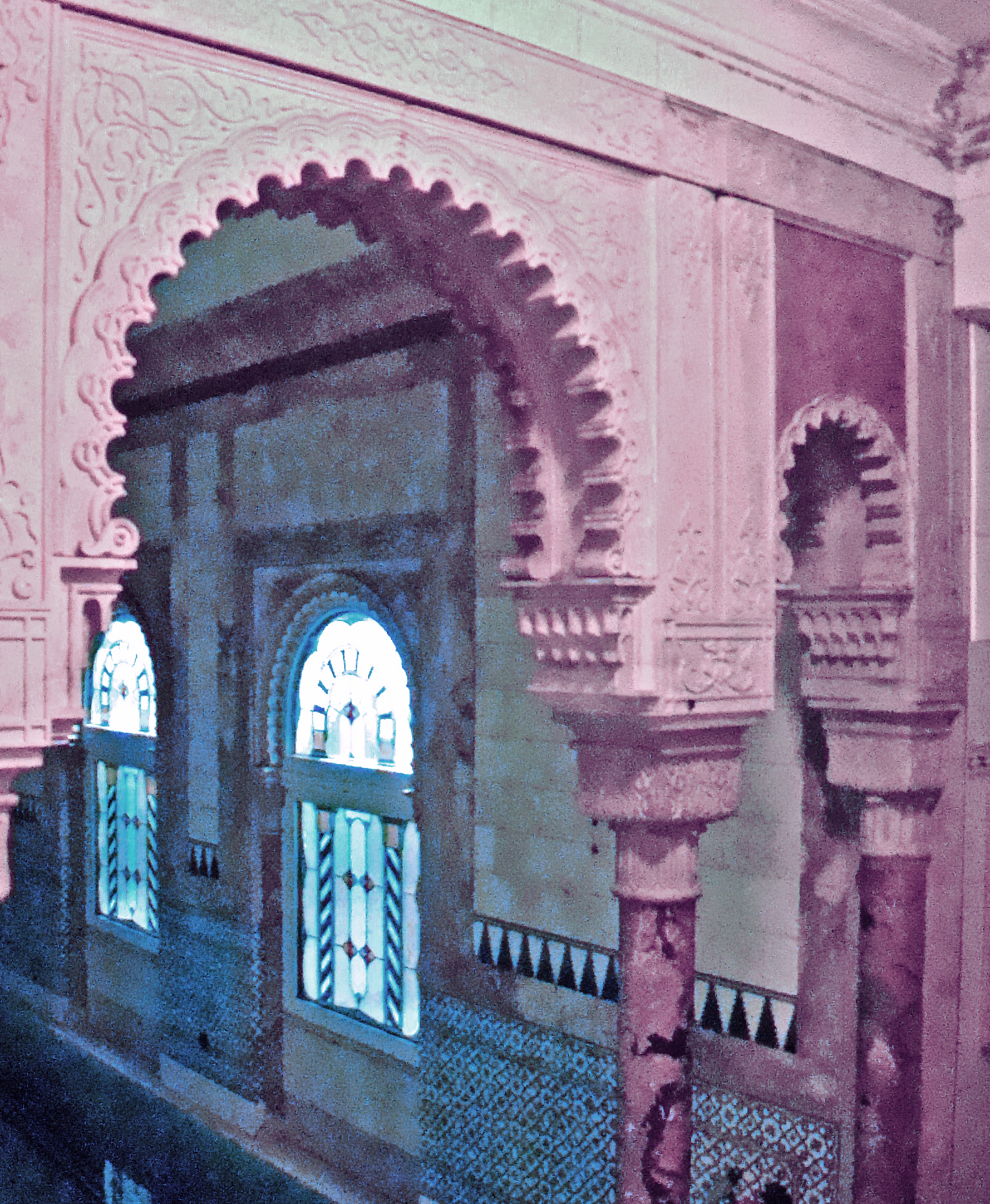
Pool (2009)

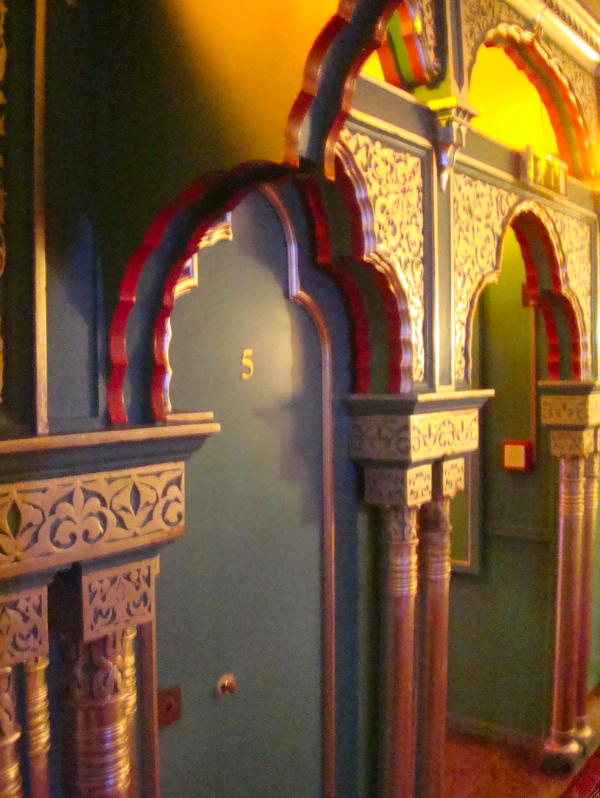
Old Cabin

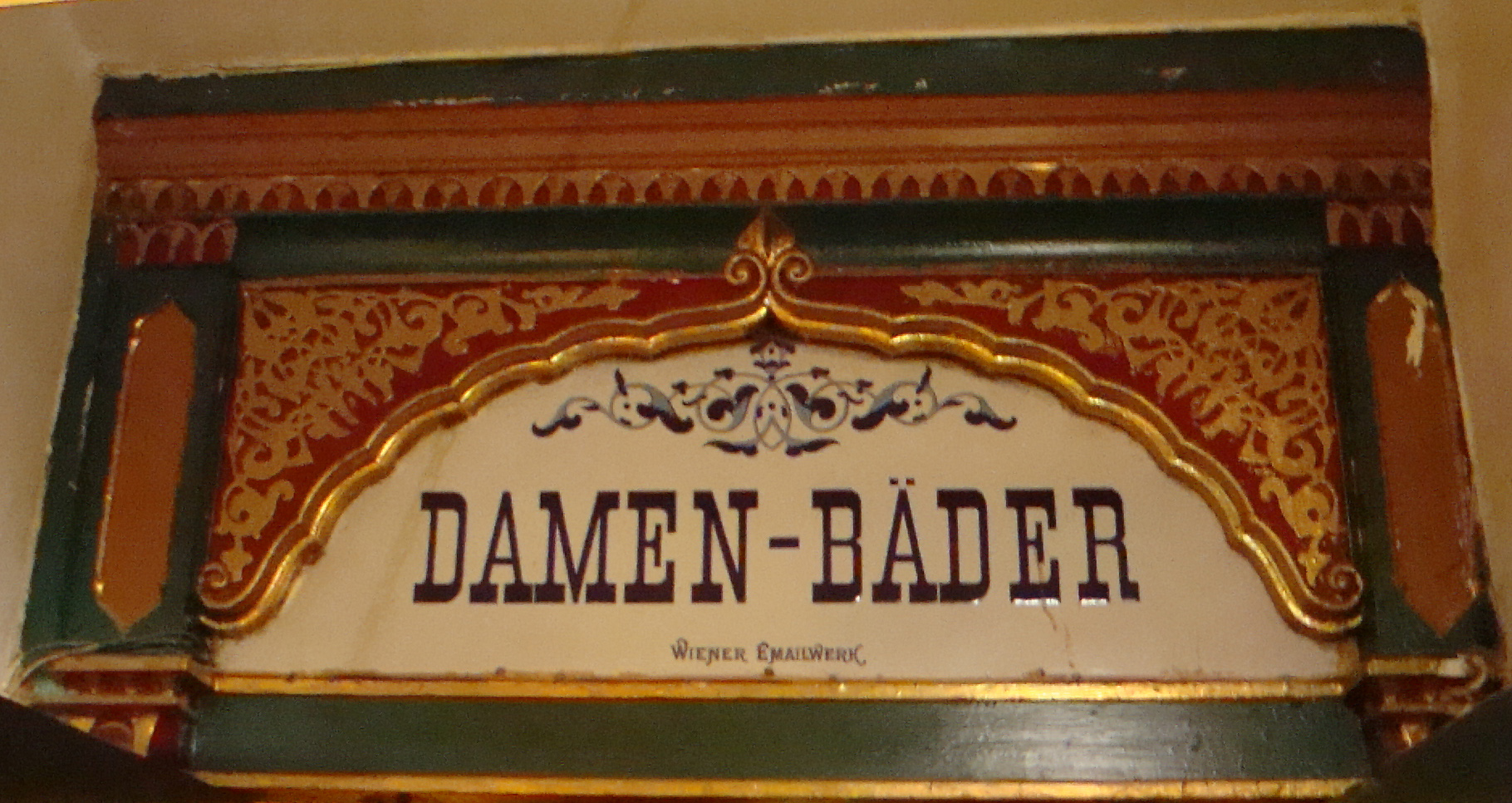
The women's Bath (Entrance)

Central Bathhouse Vienna (opened in 1889 as Central-Bad Wien, Zentralbad Wien, and also known as Kaiserbründl) is a bathing establishment in Vienna, Austria.

== History ==
The Centralbad (today: Kaiserbründl) for the last 120 years is generally regarded as the oldest and most distinguished bathing-establishment in Vienna. The unusually deep well of the building itself was already in use in Roman times for the small fortification at a bridge (proven through the discovery of coins dating back to the Emperors Heliogabalus and Alexander Severus). This building structure, later known as Weihenpurgkh, formed part of a separate fortified small suburb outside Vienna until 1156. In the Middle Ages and until 1880 this area was the centre for textiles (der alte Ramhof), the first document mentioning a padstubn (“bathing room”) in this house dates back to 1369.

== Building ==
Between 1887 and 1889, the house was built by the famous Viennese architects Anton Honus, Anton Lang (the father of Fritz Lang), Albert Constantin Swoboda and the brothers Edmund and Franz Czada and the interior received its present look in 1894.

During the late 19th century the Centralbad (then the only bath in the city centre) gained a very great social reputation. Simon Baruch, the famous pioneer in the field of hydrotherapy and founder of the public bathing system of New York, called the Viennese Bath "the most substantial, elegant and complete bath in the world." Among its regular guests was the Archduke Ludwig Viktor of Austria, a brother of the emperor Franz Joseph I of Austria, who was openly homosexual. The name Kaiserbründl has been chosen in remembrance of the visits of three imperial majesties in another Vienna bathhouse, the Roemisches Bad (Roman Bathhouse, opened in 1873) at Praterstern.

Visitors of recent years include George Michael and the now missing Aeryn Gillern.

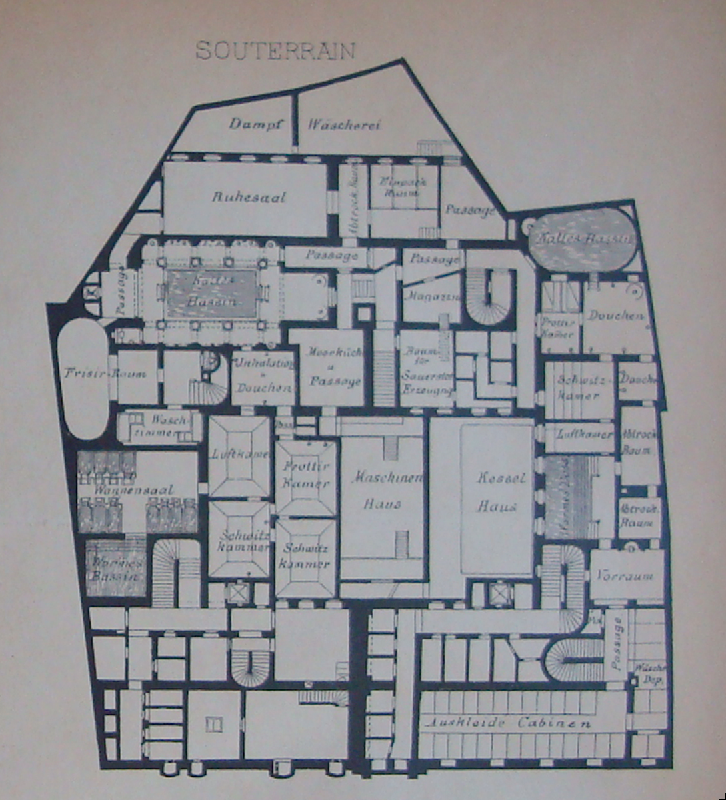
Ground plan Souterrain

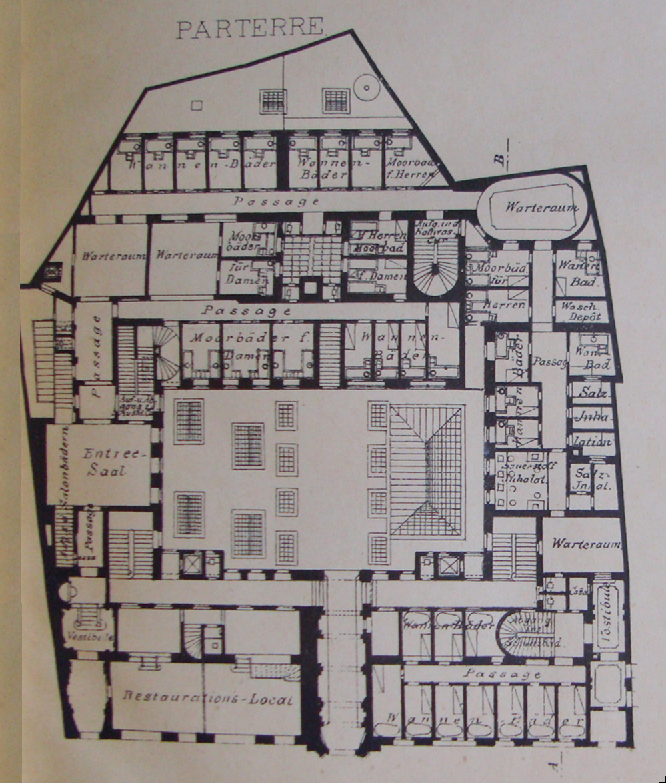
Ground plan Parterre

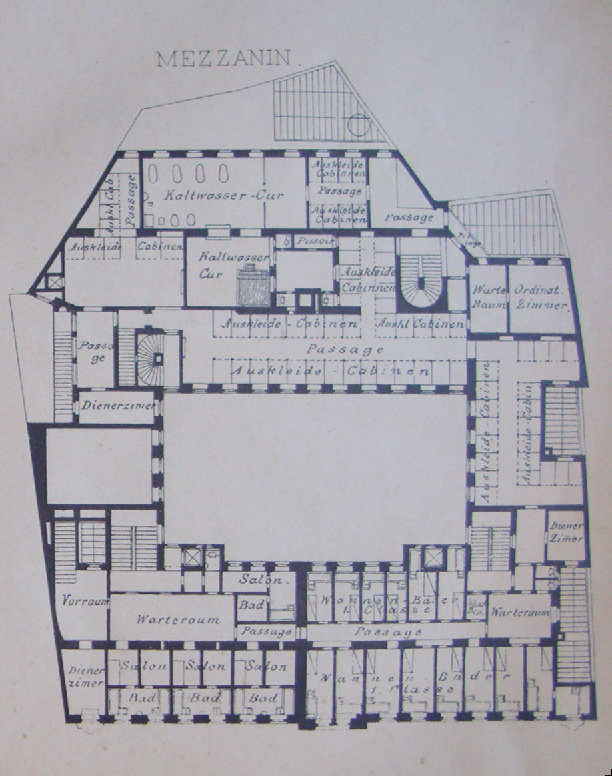
Ground plan Mezzanin

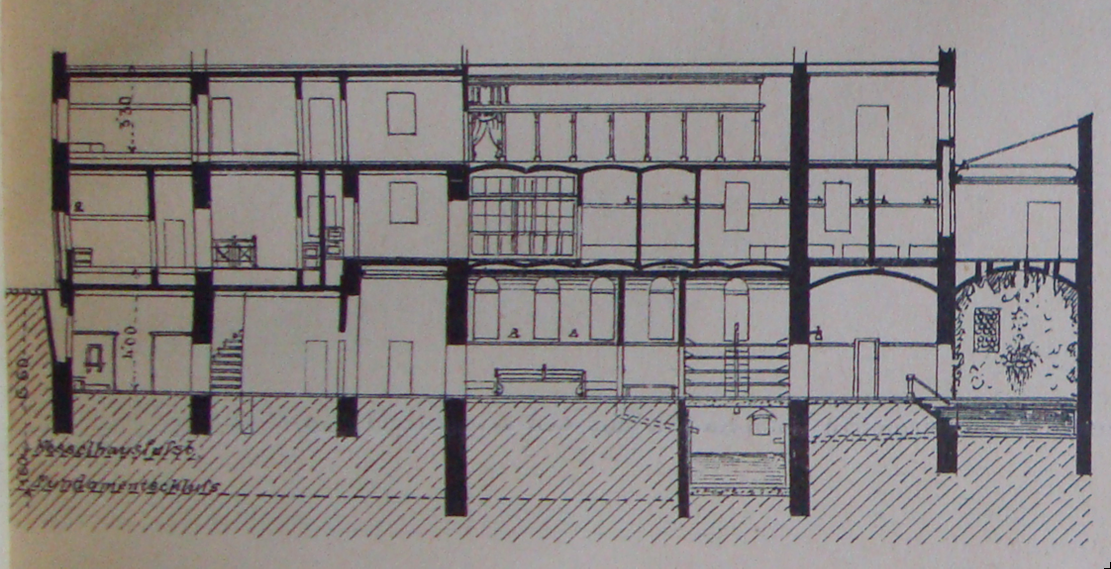
Elevational view

Blueprints as supplement of Anton Honus’ essay: Das Wiener Zentralbad
