= International Association for the Treatment of Sexual Offenders =

Organization

The International Association for the Treatment of Sexual Offenders (IATSO) is an international non-profit professional organization based in Vienna committed to the promotion of research of and treatment for sex offenders throughout the world.

== History ==
IATSO was founded on March 24, 1998 in Caracas, Venezuela during the 5th International Conference on the Treatment of Sex Offenders. They publish Sex Offender Treatment, an international peer-reviewed journal open to all scientists and practitioners researching sexual abuse.

=== Lifetime Achievement Awards ===
In 2014, the first ever Lifetime Achievement Award was awarded to William L. Marshall at the 13th IATSO Conference in Porto, Portugal. Marshall was the Director of Rockwood Psychological Services, and president of the IATSO from 2008 to 2012. In 2016, Friedemann Pfafflin was awarded the second Lifetime Achievement Award at the 14th IATSO Conference in Copenhagen, Denmark. He was the founding President of IATSO.
