= Vienna Pride =

LGBT pride parade in Austria

- Location: Vienna
- Country: Austria

Vienna Pride is a celebration that takes place in the Austrian capital every year in support of equality for lesbian, gay, bisexual and transgender (LGBTQ) people. It includes the Austrian pride parade, the Rainbow Parade (German: Regenbogenparade) which takes place on the Vienna Ring Road, (Ringstraße), at the end of the festival.

== History ==
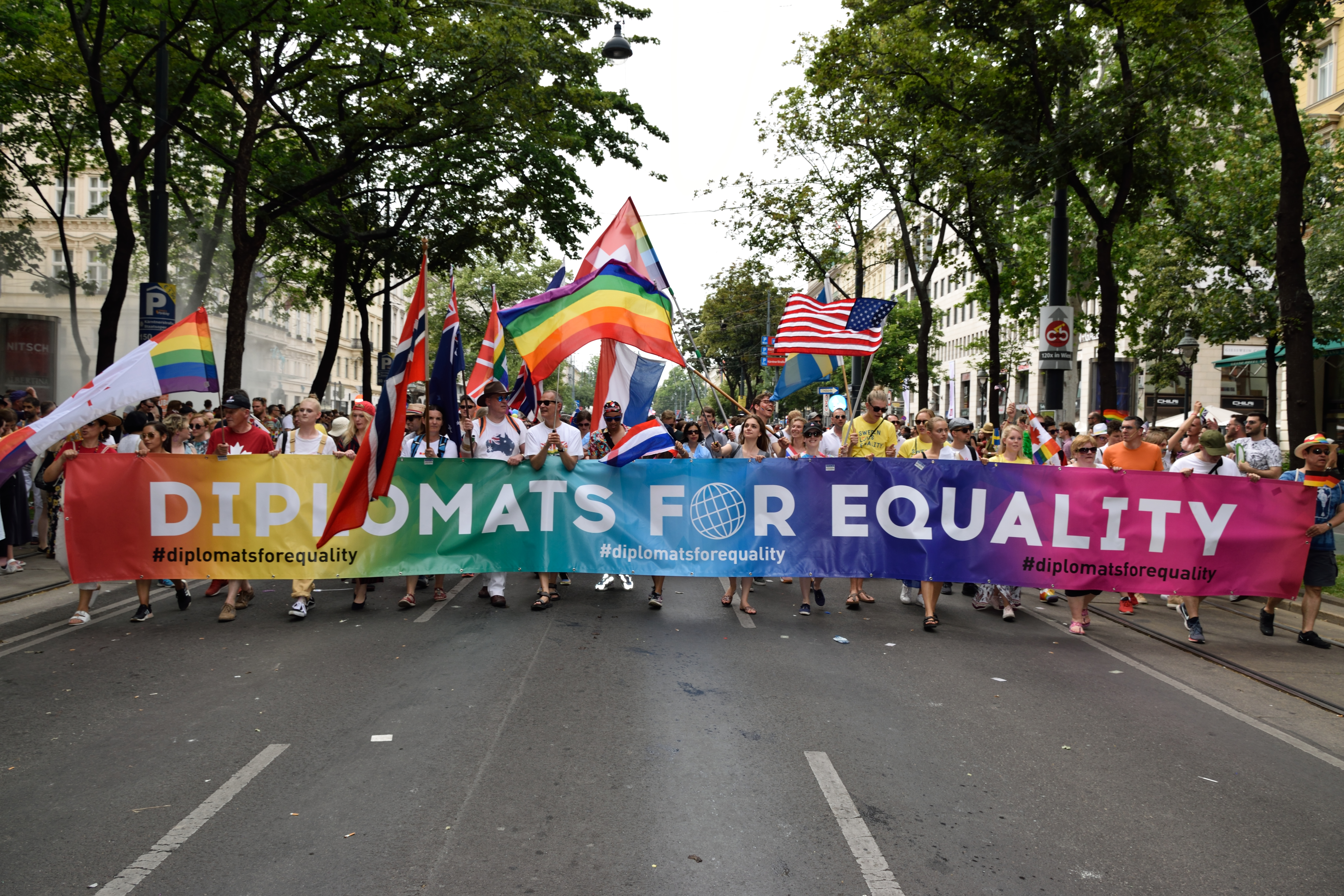
Diplomats for Equality at Europride Vienna in 2019.

HOSI Wien organised the first gay rights half-day festival and unofficial march in Vienna in 1982, attended by approximately 100 people. This was followed by the first Pride parade in 1984, organised by a range of gay and lesbian groups as part of Gay Pride Week ("Warme Woche"). Approximately 300 participants marched down Kärntner Straße.

The Rainbow Parade became established as regular event in June 1996, organised by the Austrian Lesbian and Gay Forum. The organisation CSD Wien was founded with the sole purpose of running the event, and managed the parade until bankruptcy in 2001. Since 2003 the parade has been organised by the association HOSI Wien (Gay Initiative Vienna).

The Rainbow Parade is held every year at the end of June / beginning of July on a Saturday. It is one of the few demonstrations to traverse the Vienna Ring Road counterclockwise.

Vienna Pride ran for two weeks in 2018, ending in the Rainbow Parade on 16 June.

Vienna hosted Europride in 2001 and 2019, with Vienna Pride taking that name for the annual event.

Since 2003, the parade has been organised by the association HOSI Vienna (Gay Initiative Vienna).

Vienna Pride Village is constructed on City Hall Square, offering a mix of culture, shows, food and information during the second week of the festival.

Vienna Pride Run was held for the first time in 2018.
