= Michael Baurmann =

German sociologist

Michael Baurmann (born January 1952) is a German sociologist whose main research interests are general theory of sociology, rational choice theory, social epistemology, and the epistemic dimensions of democracy. He is a senior professor at the Heinrich Heine University Düsseldorf and co-editor of Analyse & Kritik.

== Biography ==
Baurmann studied sociology, philosophy, and law at the Goethe University Frankfurt from 1970 to 1976, where he obtained a diploma in sociology in 1976, received his doctorate in 1983 and habilitated in 1994. From 1990 to 1997, he was Academic Councilor (Akademischer rat), later Academic Senior Councilor (Akademischer Oberrat), at the University of Mainz. In the winter semester 1992/93, he represented the professorship of legal sociology and legal theory at the University of Frankfurt. Baurmann has been Professor of Sociology at Heinrich Heine University Düsseldorf since 1997, and scientific director of the Center for Advanced Internet Studies in Bochum since 2017.

== Publication ==
- Der Markt Der Tugend: Recht und Moral ln der liberalen Gesellschaft [The Market of Virtue: Morality and Commitment in a Liberal Society]
