= HOSI Wien =

Gay and lesbian association in Vienna, Austria

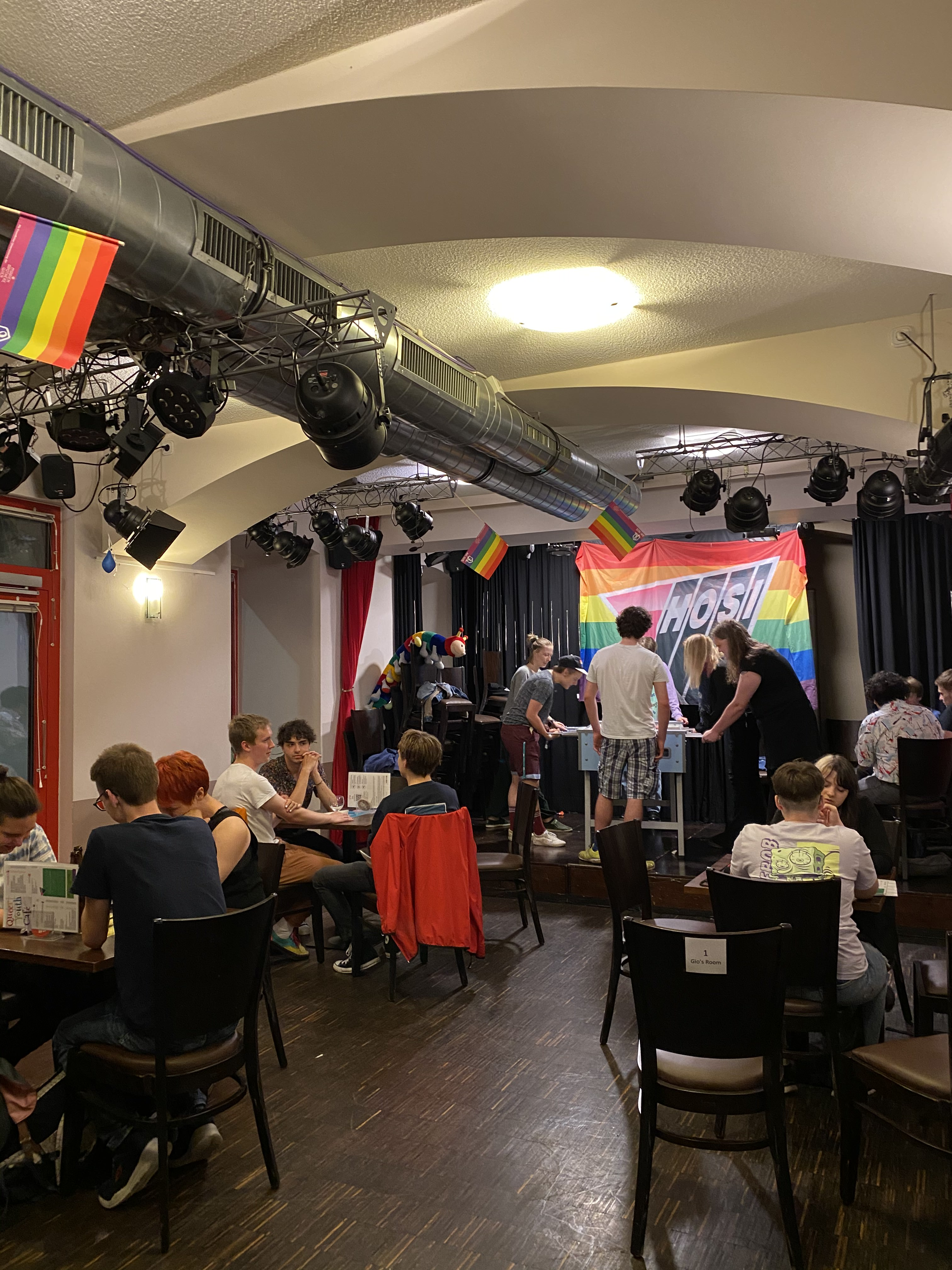
Youth event by HOSI Wien in August 2021

The Homosexual Initiative Vienna (HOSI Wien) was founded in Vienna in 1979. It is Austria's oldest and largest lesbian, gay and bisexual association. It is a member-based organisation holding an annual general meeting and board elections. The organisation supports several sub groups including a youth group and women's group. It organises the annual Vienna Pride and Rainbow Parade.

== Origin of the name ==
HOSI is an abbreviation of "Homosexuelle Initiative" and is used as a prefix by several different organisations advocating for the rights of lesbian, gay and bisexual people in Austria and certain neighbouring counties, such as HOSI Linz, HOSI Salzburg, HOSI Tirol. HOSI is also used collectively to refer to these organisations.

== Activities ==
HOSI Vienna works to secure and maintain LGBT rights in Austria. In the 1980s and 1990s, HOSI Wien was active in the HIV/ AIDS movement. It maintains the Names Project Wien, an HIV/AIDS memorial quilt initiative started in 1992.

It has been publishing the oldest German language gay and lesbian magazine, LAMBDA-Nachrichten, since 1979 and manages a community centre near Vienna's Naschmarkt called Das Gugg. This also serves as the organisation's office, archives and storage facilities. It houses meeting rooms, a bar, a dance floor and a stage, and runs a theatre group, The HOSIsters.

== Marches and parades ==
In 1982, HOSI Wien organised Vienna's first gay rights half-day festival and unofficial march, attended by around 100 people. This was followed in 1984 by the first Pride Parade, organised by a range of gay and lesbian groups as part of Gay Pride Week (“Warme Woche”). Approximately 300 participants marched down Kärntner Straße.

In 1989, HOSI Wien organised a gay marriage parade complete with unofficial wedding ceremonies.

HOSI Wien took over the organisation of the Rainbow Parade following the bankruptcy in 2003 of CSD Wien, the Parade's previous organisers. They organised the 8th Europride in 2001 and the 26th Europride in 2019.
