= Gertrude Fröhlich-Sandner =

Austrian politician

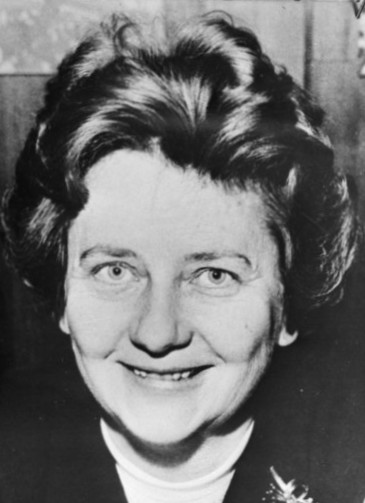
Gertrude Fröhlich-Sandner, 1970

Gertrude Fröhlich-Sandner (born Gertrude Kastner; 25 April 1926 – died 13 June 2008) was an Austrian politician for the SPÖ (Social Democratic Party of Austria).

She was born and died in Vienna. In 1993 she became an honorary citizen of Vienna.
