= Rainbow Cities Network =

International network of cities promoting LGBTI rights

The Rainbow Cities Network (RCN) is a global network of cities that work together to promote and protect the human rights of lesbian, gay, bisexual, transgender and intersex (LGBTI) people. Founded in 2012 by the cities of Amsterdam, Barcelona, Cologne and Turin, the network was registered as an independent organization on July 8, 2019. Currently, the network has over 60 member cities from 22 countries, primarily in Europe.

== Recognition and status ==
The Rainbow Cities Network has observer status with the Council of Europe's Committee of Experts on Sexual Orientation, Gender Identity and Expression and Sex Characteristics (ADI-SOGIESC).

In 2015, the Congress of Local and Regional Authorities of the Council of Europe adopted Resolution 380, which encourages local and regional authorities to "share examples of good practice with other local and regional authorities, for example through networks such as the Rainbow Cities Network."

That same year, United Nations Deputy High Commissioner for Human Rights Flavia Pansieri cited the network as an example of how local initiatives can transform national debates on combating homophobia and transphobia.

== Activities ==
The network's members work together by sharing good practices, establishing joint initiatives, and working on LGBTI policy development. An annual meeting is hosted by a member city every year, and an annual photo exhibition for the International Day Against Homophobia, Biphobia and Transphobia (IDAHOBIT) occurs on May 17.

With financing from the European Commission, the network produced Rainbow Cities in Action: Policy Guidelines for Municipalities, a publication providing guidance for local governments on implementing LGBTI-inclusive policies.

== Governance ==
RCN member cities are represented by staff members of city administrations. The network is managed by a managing director and administered by a board of member cities. As of 2025, the board includes Hanover (Chairperson), São Paulo, Copenhagen, Mexico City, Cork, Paris, and Barcelona.

== Research ==
A 2025 study in the journal Global Constitutionalism examined the Rainbow Cities Network as a case of norm stabilization in international relations. The study identified three activities through which RCN contributes to preventing norm decay: supporting norms in discourse and practice, establishing connections between related norms, and including affected stakeholders in policy discussions.

RCN is included in a 2025 dataset of 131 transnational municipal networks compiled by Pier Domenico Tortola.

== Members ==
As of November 2026, there are 66 member cities:

City	Country	Joined	Notes
Aarhus	Denmark	April 2019	
Amsterdam	Netherlands	June 2012	Founding member
Barcelona	Spain	June 2011	Founding member
Basel	Switzerland	March 2026	
Bergen	Norway	October 2017	
Berlin	Germany	March 2012	
Bern	Switzerland	August 2018	
Bordeaux	France	July 2021	
Braunschweig	Germany		
Bregenz	Austria		
Bremen	Germany		
Bruges	Belgium	September 2014	
Brussels-Capital Region	Belgium	March 2014	
Buenos Aires	Argentina	August 2026	
Cologne	Germany	February 2012	Founding member
Copenhagen	Denmark	December 2021	
Cork	Ireland	June 2020	
Esch-sur-Alzette	Luxembourg	January 2014	
Frankfurt	Germany	February 2020	
Geneva	Switzerland	August 2012	
Genk	Belgium	April 2023	
Ghent	Belgium	October 2014	
Giessen	Germany	July 2023	
Hamburg	Germany	July 2016	
Hanover	Germany	May 2013	
Hasselt	Belgium		
Heidelberg	Germany	September 2020	
Helsinki	Finland	July 2021	
Kortrijk	Belgium	September 2021	
Kotor	Montenegro	February 2020	
Lausanne	Switzerland	April 2023	
Leuven	Belgium	April 2014	
Lille	France	March 2022	
Linz	Austria	October 2020	
Ljubljana	Slovenia	July 2013	
Lucerne	Switzerland	July 2026	
Luxembourg	Luxembourg	June 2025	
Mainz	Germany		
Mannheim	Germany	December 2015	
Mechelen	Belgium		
Mexico City	Mexico	August 2014	
Montevideo	Uruguay	July 2026	
Montpellier	France	June 2023	
Montreal	Canada	May 2022	
Munich	Germany	May 2012	
Munster	Germany	January 2025	
New Taipei City	Taiwan	January 2021	
Nuremberg	Germany	November 2017	
Oldenburg	Germany	July 2023	
Oslo	Norway	June 2017	
Osnabrück	Germany	September 2025	
Ostend	Belgium	August 2021	
Paris	France	August 2018	
Podgorica	Montenegro		
Rennes	France	August 2026	
Reykjavík	Iceland	July 2019	
Roeselare	Belgium	January 2023	
Rotterdam	Netherlands	January 2017	
San Francisco	United States	January 2023	
São Paulo	Brazil	August 2014	
Taipei	Taiwan	October 2020	
The Hague	Netherlands	February 2025	
Vienna	Austria	September 2012	
Wiesbaden	Germany	June 2021	
Zagreb	Croatia	October 2025	
Zurich	Switzerland	September 2012	

== See also ==
- LGBTQ rights in Europe
- Council of Europe
- Mayors for Peace
