= List of Miss Indonesia International =

Indonesia beauty pageant award list

Miss International Indonesia
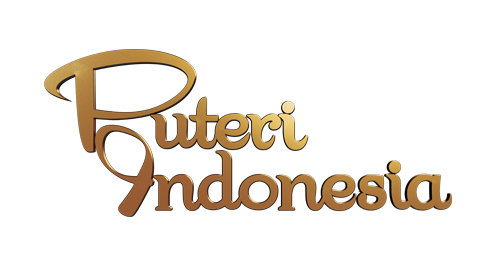
- Logo of the Puteri Indonesia org., as the license-holder of Miss International Indonesia.
- Formation: 1960; 66 years ago
- Type: Beauty pageant
- Headquarters: Jakarta, Indonesia
- Location: Indonesia
- Members: Miss International
- Affiliations: Puteri Indonesia
- Website: www.puteri-indonesia.com

Miss International Indonesia is one of the beauty pageant title by Puteri Indonesia Org., the winners of Puteri Indonesia will represent Indonesia in one of the oldest Big Four international beauty pageants, Miss International. Indonesia start its debut in pageantry on 1960. The first pageant appointing Indonesia's delegates to this contest was Miss Java held on 1960, 1968, and 1969. In the early 1970s the founder of Beauty Salon "Andy's Beauty", Mrs. Andi Nurhayati together with 7th Governor of Jakarta Special Capital Region, Mr. Ali Sadikin took off the franchise.

Due to its absence regarding the governmental regulation towards pageantry from 1978 to 2006, Andi's Beauty loses its franchise to Miss International Pageant and is moving to Puteri Indonesia, a national pageant held by Mustika Ratu; Indonesia's oldest and biggest cosmetics herbal company. Began in 2007, Puteri Indonesia select Puteri Indonesia Pariwisata 2006 to Miss International 2007 and Puteri Indonesia Lingkungan 2007-2022 and 2024 to Miss International 2008-2022 and 2024. In 2023, the winner of Puteri Indonesia represented Indonesia on Miss International Beauty Pageants. Since 2024, Puteri Indonesia Org stated that the international competition for Top 4 Puteri Indonesia will be decided after the final night. The president-owner of Puteri Indonesia are The Highest Royal Family of Surakarta Sunanate, Mooryati Soedibyo and Putri Kuswisnuwardhani. The 25th Miss International Indonesia is Puteri Indonesia Lingkungan 2025, Melliza Xaviera of DKI Jakarta who was crowned on 2 May 2025 at Jakarta Convention Center, Jakarta, Indonesia.

== Titleholders ==
Below are the Indonesian representatives to the Miss International pageant according to the year in which they participated. The special awards received and their final placements in the aforementioned global beauty competition are also displayed.

Color key

- : Declared as Winner
- : Ended as runner-up
- : Ended as one of the finalists or semi-finalists

Year	Name	National Title	Province	Placement	Special Awards
1960	Wiana Sulastini	Miss Java	Jakarta SCR		
Did not compete between 1961—1967: There is complete disagreement about Indonesia's delivery of beauty events from the government.
1968	Sylvia Taliwongso	Miss Indonesia Programme	Jakarta SCR		
1969	Irma Priscilla Hadisurya	Miss Indonesia Programme	Central Java		
1970	Louise Marie Dominique Maengkom	Putri Indonesia Runner-up	North Sulawesi		
Did not compete between 1971—1973: There is complete disagreement about Indonesia's delivery of beauty events from the government.
1974	Lydia Arlini Wahab	Putri Indonesia	Jakarta SCR		
1975	Yayuk Rahayu Sosiawati	Putri Indonesia Runner-up	Central Java		
1976	Treesye Ratri Astuti	Putri Nusantara Indonesia	Central Java		
1977	Indri Hapsari Suharto	Putri Indonesia 2nd Runner-up	Central Java	2nd Runner-up	
Did not compete between 1978—2006: Abstained from competing because of Indonesian government's issues with beauty pageants.
2007	Rahma Landy Sjahruddin	Puteri Indonesia Pariwisata 2006	Jakarta SCR	Top 15	
2008	Duma Riris Silalahi	Puteri Indonesia Lingkungan 2007	North Sumatera		
2009	Ayu Diandra Sari Tjakra	Puteri Indonesia Lingkungan 2008	Bali		
2010	Zukhriatul Hafizah Muhammad	Puteri Indonesia Lingkungan 2009	West Sumatera		Miss Friendship
2011	Reisa Kartikasari Brotoasmoro	Puteri Indonesia Lingkungan 2010	D.I. Yogyakarta		
2012	Liza Elly Purnamasari	Puteri Indonesia Lingkungan 2011	East Java		
2013	Marissa Sartika Maladewi	Puteri Indonesia Lingkungan 2013	South Sumatera		
2014	Elfin Pertiwi Rappa	Puteri Indonesia Lingkungan 2014	South Sumatera	Top 10	Best National Costume
2015	Chintya Fabyola	Puteri Indonesia Lingkungan 2015	West Kalimantan		
2016	Felicia Hwang Yi Xin	Puteri Indonesia Lingkungan 2016	Lampung	2nd Runner-up	Miss Best Dresser
2017	Kevin Lilliana Junaedy	Puteri Indonesia Lingkungan 2017	West Java	Miss International 2017	Miss Best Dresser
2018	Vania Fitryanti Herlambang	Puteri Indonesia Lingkungan 2018	Banten	Top 15	Miss Panasonic Beauty Ambassador
2019	Jolene Marie Cholock Rotinsulu	Puteri Indonesia Lingkungan 2019	North Sulawesi	Top 8	Miss Panasonic Beauty Ambassador
No competition between 2020—2021: The COVID-19 pandemic impacted Miss International competition.
2022	Cindy May McGuire	Puteri Indonesia Lingkungan 2022	Jakarta SCR		
2023	Farhana Nariswari Wisandana	Puteri Indonesia 2023	West Java		Best in Evening Gown
2024	Sophie Kirana	Puteri Indonesia Lingkungan 2024	D.I. Yogyakarta	4th Runner-up	
2025	Melliza Xaviera	Puteri Indonesia Lingkungan 2025	Jakarta SCR	3rd Runner-up	
2026	Victoria Titisari Kosasieputri	Puteri Indonesia Lingkungan 2026	Bali	TBA	TBA

== Crossovers to other international pageants ==
Name	Competition	Placement
Irma Priscilla Hadisurya	Miss Asia Pacific International 1970	Miss Friendship
Louise Marie Dominique Maengkom	Queen of The Pacific 1970	
Lydia Arlini Wahab	Queen of The Pacific 1974	Miss Crowning Glory
Lydia Arlini Wahab	Miss Universe 1975	

== Indonesia's Placement at Miss International ==
Name of Pageant	Winner	2nd Runner-up	3rd Runner-up	4th Runner-up	Top 8-10	Top 15-20	Total Placements
Miss International	2017	1977 • 2016	2025	2024	2014 • 2019	2007 • 2018	9
Total	1 Winner	2 Runners-up	1 Runner-up	1 Runner-up	2 Finalists	2 Semi-Finalists	9

== See also ==
- Miss International
- Puteri Indonesia
- Puteri Indonesia Lingkungan
- Puteri Indonesia Pariwisata
- Puteri Indonesia Pendidikan
- Miss Universe Indonesia
- Miss Indonesia
- Putri Nusantara
- List of Miss Indonesia Earth
- Indonesia at major beauty pageants

== Notes ==
- Irma Priscilla Hardisurya is now working as a journalist, artist, and fashion consultant.
- Lydia Arlini Wahab is a mother of Indonesian female singer named Prisa Rianzi.
- Indri Hapsari Soeharto was Putri Remaja 1976 contestant (Miss Teen Indonesia 1976) and awarded as Miss Personality. Later, she made appearance in a movie titled Bulu-Bulu Cendrawasih on 1978, directed by Umar Kayam
- Rahma Landy Sjahruddin work as an actress, later continue her career as a dentist.
- Duma Riris Silalahi is married to Indonesian Idol 2005's runner up, Judika Sihotang.
- Zukhriatul Hafizah Muhammad now well known as an anti-cigarette activist and currently working as a staff in Ministry of Tourism. Recently she and her team opened a beauty camp called "Ratu Sejagad" who also handling the preparation of Indonesia's first ever Miss International, Kevin Liliana.
- Reisa Kartikasari Brotoasmoro later married a Prince of Surakarta and named as Princess of Surakarta. She's also host the Dr. Oz Indonesia.
- Liza Elly Purnamasari was crowned Miss Earth Indonesia 2010, but she was unable to compete in Miss Earth 2010 and was replaced by Jessica Tji, her first runner up in the following year.
- Kevin Lilliana Junaedy is currently working as journalist and news anchor in SCTV
- Jolene Marie Cholock-Rotinsulu is an actress, singer and volunteered for 2018 Asian Para Games and Tokyo, 2020 Olympic Games.
