= Puteri Indonesia =

National beauty pageant competition in Indonesia

Yayasan Puteri Indonesia
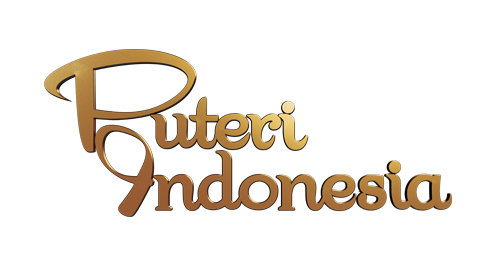
- Formation: 8 March 1992; 34 years ago Surakarta, Central Java, Indonesia
- Type: Beauty pageant
- Headquarters: Jakarta
- Location: Indonesia
- Members: Miss International; Miss Supranational; Miss Cosmo; Miss Charm
- Official language: Indonesian; English
- National director: Putri Kus Wisnu Wardani
- Parent organization: Puteri Indonesia Charities, Inc.
- Subsidiaries: Puteri Indonesia Lingkungan; Puteri Indonesia Pariwisata; Puteri Indonesia Pendidikan
- Affiliations: The Royal Highest Family of Surakarta Sunanate; Mustika Ratu
- Website: www.puteri-indonesia.com

Puteri Indonesia (Javanese: (Hanacaraka) ꦦꦸꦠꦺꦫꦶꦆꦤ꧀ꦢꦺꦴꦤꦺꦱ; lit. 'Princess of Indonesia') is a national beauty pageant in Indonesia. Puteri Indonesia is traditionally held in March, alongside the celebration of International Women's Day. The pageant annually sends its representative to compete at Miss International, one of the Big Four international beauty pageants. The pageant also sends representatives for Miss Supranational, Miss Cosmo, and Miss Charm pageants.

Aside from crowning the winner of the pageant, Puteri Indonesia Organization also crowns the first, second, and third runner-up as Puteri Indonesia Lingkungan, Puteri Indonesia Pariwisata, and Puteri Indonesia Pendidikan, respectively.

The current titleholder of Puteri Indonesia is Agnes Aditya Rahajeng from Banten, who was crowned on 24 April 2026 at the Jakarta Convention Center, Jakarta. Her Sub-winner Court includes:

- Puteri Indonesia Lingkungan: Victoria Titisari Kosasieputri from Bali
- Puteri Indonesia Pariwisata: Karina Moudy Widodo from Jakarta
- Puteri Indonesia Pendidikan: Gisela Belicia Alma Thesalonica from Jakarta

== History ==
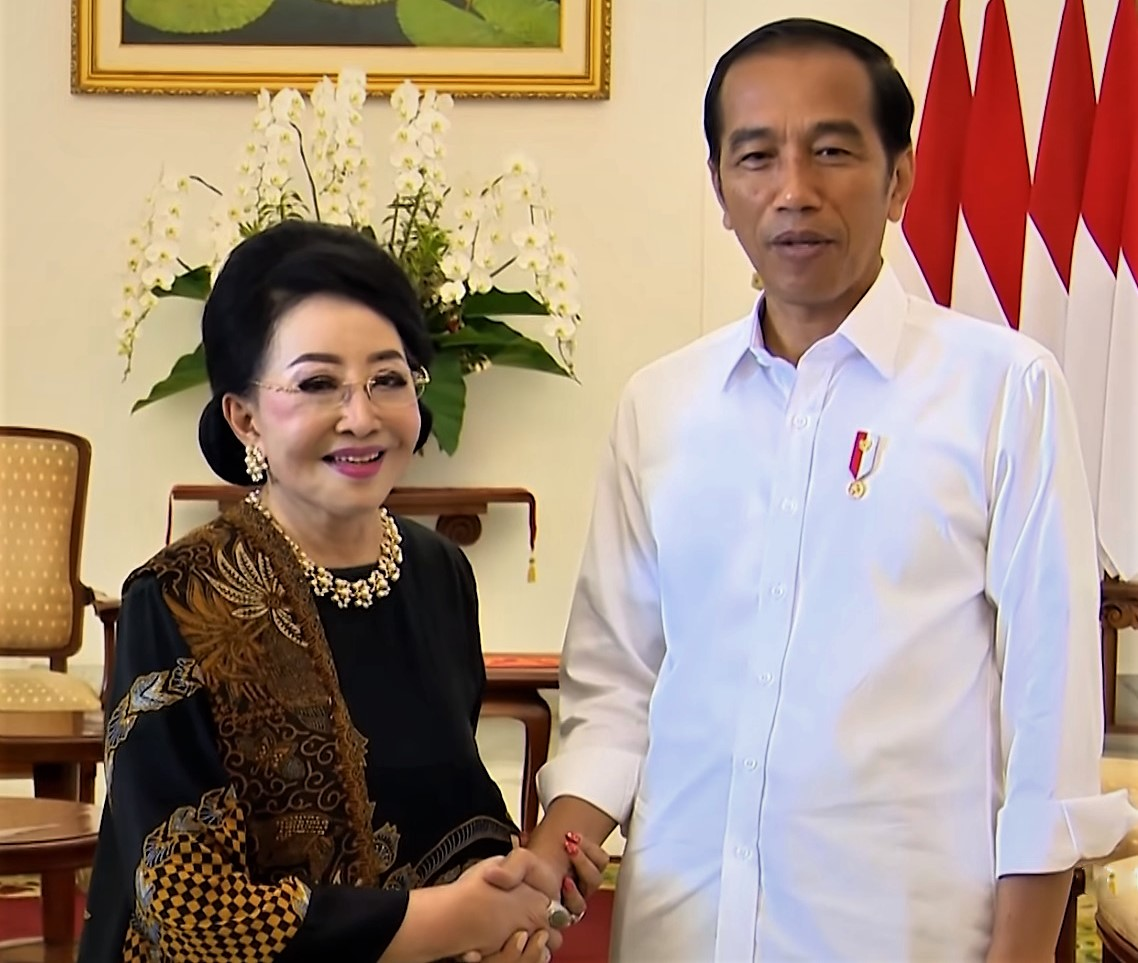
The president and CEO of Puteri Indonesia Org., The Royal Highest Princess Mooryati Soedibyo of Surakarta Sunanate, meeting with President Joko Widodo in Bogor Presidential Palace.

The pageant is run by the Puteri Indonesia Organization, based in Jakarta, and owned by Puteri Indonesia Charities, Inc., with the president-owners being the Royal Highest Family of Surakarta Sunanate, Princess Mooryati Soedibyo and Princess Putri Kuswisnuwardhani.

The pageant was established in 1992 and is considered the oldest national beauty pageant in Indonesia, with Indira Paramarini Sudiro being the first ever Puteri Indonesia who was crowned Puteri Indonesia 1992 and won Miss ASEAN 1992 title. Puteri Indonesia 1996, Alya Rohali, had the longest reign in the pageant history, from 1996 to 1999.

The pageant was founded to choose a representative to compete in Miss Universe, however from 1997 until 2004, the pageant's winners did not compete at the Miss Universe pageant. Puteri Indonesia pageant winners were again sent to the Miss Universe, Miss International, and Miss Supranational since 2005 after receiving support from Megawati Soekarnoputri, the first female President of Indonesia. The pageant has since been held consecutively every year, with the titleholders being sent to participate in international beauty pageants. Some examples are Artika Sari Devi Kusmayadi at Miss Universe 2005 in Thailand, Lindi Cistia Prabha at Miss World 2005 in China, Rahma Landy Sjahruddin at Miss International 2007 in Japan, Alessandra Khadijah Usman at Miss Asia Pacific World 2011 in Chile, Cokorda Istri Krisnanda Widani at Miss Supranational 2013 in Belarus, Novia Indriani Mamuaja at Miss Grand International 2013 in Thailand, Ketut Permata Juliastrid Sari at Miss Cosmo 2024 in Vietnam, and Melati Tedja at Miss Charm 2024 in Vietnam.

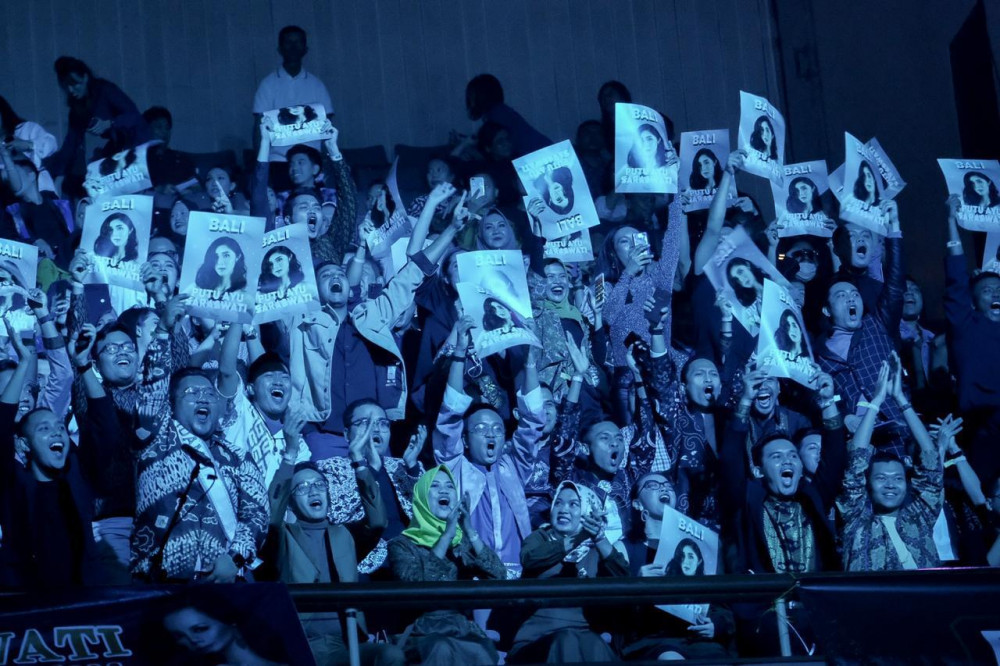
Fans at Puteri Indonesia 2020

The Puteri Indonesia pageant is traditionally held on March (alongside International Women's Day) in Jakarta. Candidate selection starts at provincial level, with those chosen from each province set to compete in the national level pageant. Puteri Indonesia Organization is supported by the president and the cabinet. In 2019, Joko Widodo announced Puteri Indonesia as a National Intangible Cultural Heritage of Indonesia, which carries the values of Indonesian culture and society togetherness, to celebrate the role of women in the creative industry, environment, tourism, education and social awareness.

Final coronation nights of the pageant were originally broadcast on Indosiar (except for 2007), however, Puteri Indonesia 2019 and the consecutive editions are broadcast on SCTV, making the television networks owned by Surya Citra Media (SCM) as the official broadcasters of Puteri Indonesia.

In February 2023, Puteri Indonesia Organization lost its Miss Universe license and received its Miss Charm license.

Since 2024, all four titleholders of Puteri Indonesia competition are no longer competing in a fixed international beauty pageant based on their placement, but instead competing in one of four pageants (Miss International, Miss Supranational, Miss Charm, and Miss Cosmo) that will be decided by the Puteri Indonesia organization for each titleholder after the competition ends, regardless of the pageant's result.

== International crowns ==
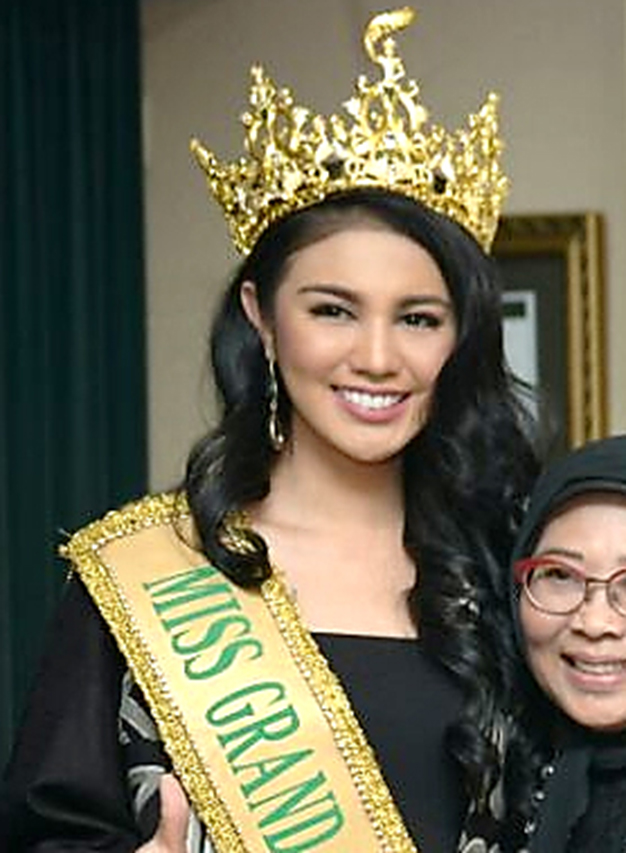
Miss Grand International 2016
Ariska Putri Pertiwi

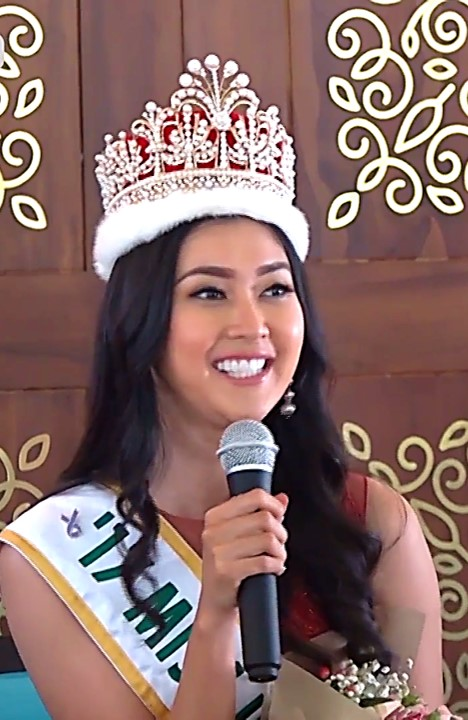
Miss International 2017
Kevin Lilliana

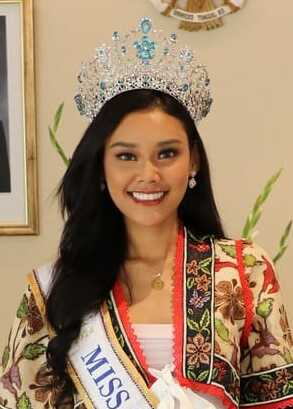
Miss Supranational 2024
Harashta Haifa Zahra

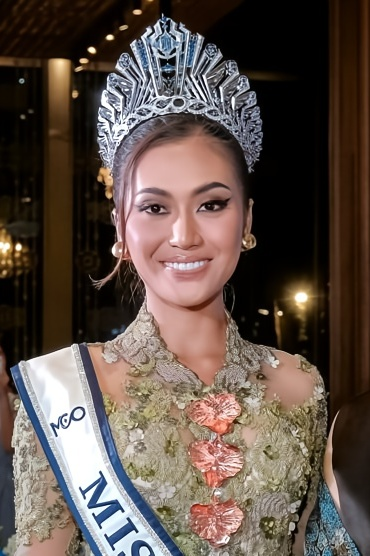
Miss Cosmo 2024
Ketut Permata Juliastrid Sari
- One – Miss International winner: Kevin Lilliana (2017)
- One – Miss Supranational winner: Harashta Haifa Zahra (2024)
- One – Miss Grand International winner: Ariska Putri Pertiwi (2016)
- One – Miss Cosmo winner: Ketut Permata Juliastrid Sari (2024)

=== Placements at international pageants ===
==== Current licenses ====
- 8 placements at Miss International (2007, 2014, 2016-2019, 2024-2025). The highest placement is Kevin Lilliana as Miss International 2017.
- 11 placements at Miss Supranational (2013, 2016-2019, and 2021-2026). The highest placement is Harashta Haifa Zahra as Miss Supranational 2024.
- 2 placements at Miss Cosmo (2024-2025). The highest placement is Ketut Permata Juliastrid Sari as Miss Cosmo 2024.
- 2 placements at Miss Charm (2024-2025). The highest placement is Rinanda Aprillya Maharani as 2nd Runner-up of Miss Charm 2025.

==== Past licenses ====
- 8 placements at Miss Universe (2005, 2013-2016, and 2018-2020). The highest placement is Frederika Alexis Cull as Top 10 of Miss Universe 2019.
- 2 placements at Miss Grand International (2016 and 2017). The highest placement is Ariska Putri Pertiwi as Miss Grand International 2016.
- 2 placements at Miss Asia Pacific World (2011 and 2012). The highest placement is Alessandra Khadijah Usman as 1st Runner-up of Miss Asia Pacific World 2011.

Ariska Putri Pertiwi's final speech at the Miss Grand International 2017

== Awards ==
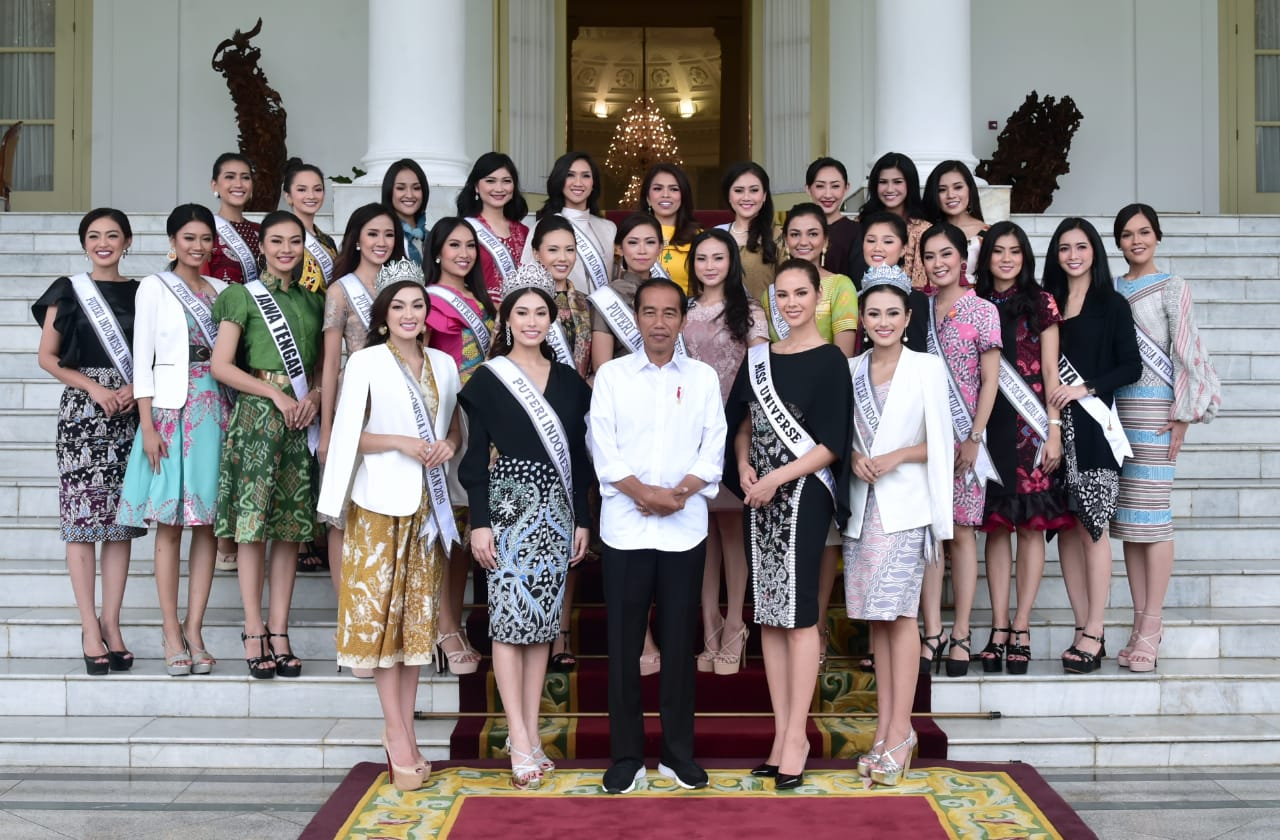
All of the Puteri Indonesia award winners and Miss Universe 2018, Catriona Gray meet with President Joko Widodo in 2019.

These are the awards most frequently presented at Puteri Indonesia each year:

CURRENT

- Puteri Indonesia Persahabatan (Miss Congeniality) (1992–present)
- Puteri Indonesia Berbakat (Miss Talent) (1992–present)
- Puteri Indonesia Intelegensia (Miss Intelligence – all of three winners of Puteri Indonesia Intelegensia will receive the master degree full scholarship programs) (1995–present)
- Best Traditional Costume (2002, 2015–present)
- Best Evening Gown (2018–present)
- Puteri Indonesia Digital & Sosial Media (People's Choice Award – voting through Puteri Indonesia Website and Social Media) (2020–present)
- Puteri Indonesia Kepulauan (Favorite Island's Princesses) (2007–present)
  - Puteri Indonesia Sumatera (Sumatra)
  - Puteri Indonesia Jawa (Java)
  - Puteri Indonesia Bali Nusa Tenggara (Lesser Sunda Islands)
  - Puteri Indonesia Kalimantan (Borneo)
  - Puteri Indonesia Sulawesi (Celebes)
  - Puteri Indonesia Timur (Eastern Indonesia)

PAST

- Puteri Indonesia Favorit (People's Choice Award) (1992–2011)
- Puteri Indonesia Fotogenik (Miss Photogenic) (1992–2001)
- Puteri Indonesia Lingkungan (Miss Environment) (1993–1996, 2004–2005)
- Puteri Indonesia Pariwisata (Miss Tourism) (1994–1996, 2004–2005)

== Titles ==
Number of wins from Puteri Indonesia (past licenses)
Pageant	Wins
Miss Universe	0
Miss World	0
Miss Grand International	1
Miss Asia Pacific World	0
World Miss University	0

Number of wins from Puteri Indonesia (current licenses)
Pageant	Wins
Miss International	1
Miss Supranational	1
Miss Cosmo	1
Miss Charm	0

Note that the year designates the time Puteri Indonesia has acquired that particular pageant franchise.

Current

- Miss International (2007–present)
- Miss Supranational (2013–present)
- Miss Cosmo (2024–present)
- Miss Charm (2024–present)

Past

- Miss Universe (1992–2022)
- Miss World (2005)
- Miss Grand International (2013, 2016–2017)
- Miss Asia Pacific World (2011–2012)
- World Miss University (1995)

=== Titleholders ===
The following is the Puteri Indonesia titleholders from 1992–present with their specific titles.

- Puteri Indonesia (1992–present)
- Puteri Indonesia Lingkungan (2006–present)
- Puteri Indonesia Pariwisata (2006–present)
- Puteri Indonesia Pendidikan (2024–present)
- Puteri Indonesia Kebudayaan (2025–present)
- Puteri Indonesia Digital (2025–present)

Year & Edition	Puteri Indonesia	1st Runner-Up	2nd Runner-Up	3rd Runner-Up	4th Runner-Up	5th Runner-Up
1st 1992	Indira Paramarini Sudiro; Jakarta SCR	Caroline Octavia; Jakarta SCR	Veria Syanusi; Lampung	Not awarded	Not awarded	Not awarded
2nd 1994	Venna Melinda Bruglia; Jakarta SCR	Irma Rahmayani Lubis; North Sumatra	Valentina Tohir; South Sumatra	Not awarded	Not awarded	Not awarded
3rd 1995	Susanty Priscilla Adresina Manuhutu; Maluku	Rosa Andriani Rai; Jakarta SCR 4	Dian Cahyani; Jambi	Not awarded	Not awarded	Not awarded
4th 1996	Alya Rohali; Jakarta SCR 1	Dyah Palipur Yudhawati; Central Java	Gusria Setiani; West Sumatra	Not awarded	Not awarded	Not awarded
5th 2000	Bernika Irnadianis Ifada; Jakarta SCR 3	Mandy Andriani Tutuarima; Yogyakarta SR	Anak Agung Ayu Inten Leony Pratiwi; Bali	Not awarded	Not awarded	Not awarded
6th 2001	Angelina Patricia Pingkan Sondakh; North Sulawesi	Helena Yorantina Souissa; Mollucas	Ni Wayan Eka Ciptasari; Bali	Not awarded	Not awarded	Not awarded
7th 2002	Melanie Putria Dewita Sari; West Sumatra	Meutia Taurissa Susmex; Aceh	Sagita Shinta Pratiwi Wacik; Jakarta SCR 2	Not awarded	Not awarded	Not awarded
8th 2003	Dian Khrisna; Jakarta SCR 2	Sisca Amelia; West Kalimantan	Melisa Yasmin Kapitan; Moluccas	Not awarded	Not awarded	Not awarded
9th 2004	Artika Sari Devi Kusmayadi; Bangka Belitung	Nadia Mulya; Banten	Novia Isabiet Monoarfa; Gorontalo	Not awarded	Not awarded	Not awarded
10th 2005	Nadine Chandrawinata; Jakarta SCR 4	Lindi Cistia Prabha; Yogyakarta SR	Valerina Daniel; Jakarta SCR 6	Not awarded	Not awarded	Not awarded
11th 2006	Agni Pratistha Arkadewi Kuswardono; Central Java	Ananda Krista Algani; South Kalimantan	Rahma Landy Sjahruddin; Jakarta SCR 5	Not awarded	Not awarded	Not awarded
12th 2007	Gracia Putri Raemawasti Mulyono; East Java	Duma Riris Silalahi; North Sumatra	Ika Fiyonda Putri; Jakarta SCR 4	Not awarded	Not awarded	Not awarded
13th 2008	Zivanna Letisha Siregar; Jakarta SCR 6	Ayu Diandra Sari Tjakra; Bali	Anggi Mahesti; DI Yogyakarta	Not awarded	Not awarded	Not awarded
14th 2009	Qory Sandioriva; Aceh	Zukhriatul Hafizah Muhammad; West Sumatra	Isti Ayu Pratiwi; North Maluku	Not awarded	Not awarded	Not awarded
15th 2010	Nadine Alexandra Dewi Ames; Jakarta SCR 4	Reisa Kartikasari Broto Asmoro; Yogyakarta SR	Alessandra Khadijah Usman; Gorontalo	Not awarded	Not awarded	Not awarded
16th 2011	Maria Selena Nurcahya; Central Java	Fiorenza Liza Elly Purnamasari; East Java	Andi Tenri Gusti Harnum Utari Natassa; South Sulawesi	Not awarded	Not awarded	Not awarded
17th 2013	Whulandary Herman; West Sumatra	Marisa Sartika Maladewi; South Sumatra	Cokorda Istri Krisnanda Widani; Bali	Novia Indriani Mamuaja; North Sulawesi	Nadia Ingrida Gani; Jakarta SCR 3	Not awarded
18th 2014	Elvira Devinamira Wirayanti; East Java	Elfin Pertiwi Rappa; South Sumatra	Lily Estelita Liana; Yogyakarta SR	Not awarded	Not awarded	Not awarded
19th 2015	Anindya Kusuma Putri; Central Java	Chintya Fabyola; West Kalimantan	Gresya Amanda Maaliwuga; North Sulawesi	Not awarded	Not awarded	Not awarded
Year & Edition	Puteri Indonesia	Puteri Indonesia Lingkungan	Puteri Indonesia Pariwisata	Puteri Indonesia Perdamaian	4th Runner-Up	5th Runner-Up
20th 2016	Kezia Roslin Cikita Warouw; North Sulawesi	Felicia Hwang Yi Xin; Lampung	Intan Aletrinö; West Sumatra	Ariska Putri Pertiwi; North Sumatra	Claudia Dara Chaerunnisa; Jakarta SCR 1	Not awarded
21st 2017	Bunga Jelitha Ibrani; Jakarta SCR 5	Kevin Lilliana; West Java	Karina Nadila Niab; East Nusa Tenggara	Dea Rizkita; Central Java	Syella Afsari; Jambi	Putri Mentari Sitanggang; North Sumatra
22nd 2018	Sonia Fergina Citra; Bangka Belitung	Vania Fitryanti Herlambang; Banten	Wilda Octaviana Situngkir; West Kalimantan	Dilla Fadiela; Yogyakarta SR	Berliana Permatasari; South Sumatra	Kidung Paramadita; Central Java
Year & Edition	Puteri Indonesia	Puteri Indonesia Lingkungan	Puteri Indonesia Pariwisata	3rd Runner-Up	4th Runner-Up	5th Runner-Up
23rd 2019	Frederika Alexis Cull; Jakarta SCR 1	Jolene Marie Cholock-Rotinsulu; North Sulawesi	Jesica Fitriana Martasari; West Java	Annisa Fitriana; West Sumatra	Helvanda Herman; South Sumatra	Maria Hostiana Napitupulu; East Nusa Tenggara
24th 2020	Raden Roro Ayu Maulida Putri; East Java	Putu Ayu Saraswati; Bali	Jihane Almira Chedid; Central Java	Louise Kalista Wilson-Iskandar; West Sumatra	Angel Virginia Boelan; East Nusa Tenggara	Yoan Clara Teken; Maluku
25th 2022	Laksmi Shari De-Neefe Suardana; Bali	Cindy May McGuire; Jakarta SCR 5	Adinda Cresheilla; East Java	Melanie Theresia Berentz; West Java	Chrissy Fransisca Olivyana Rugian; Banten 1	Arina Rezkyana Arfa; Southeast Sulawesi
26th 2023	Farhana Nariswari Wisandana; West Java 1	Yasinta Aurellia; East Java	Lulu Zaharani Krisna Widodo; Lampung	Dinda Nur Safira; Yogyakarta SR	Puteri Modiyanti; Jakarta SCR 2	Patricia Bella Olina; Bangka Belitung 2
Year & Edition	Puteri Indonesia	Puteri Indonesia Lingkungan	Puteri Indonesia Pariwisata	Puteri Indonesia Pendidikan & Kebudayaan	4th Runner-Up	5th Runner-Up
27th 2024	Harashta Haifa Zahra; West Java	Sophie Kirana; Yogyakarta SR	Ketut Permata Juliastrid Sari; Bali	Melati Tedja; East Java	Ghina Raihanah Tadjoedin; Jakarta SCR 1	Latisa Safa Maura; Banten
Year & Edition	Puteri Indonesia	Puteri Indonesia Lingkungan	Puteri Indonesia Pariwisata	Puteri Indonesia Pendidikan	Puteri Indonesia Kebudayaan	Puteri Indonesia Inovasi & Teknologi
28th 2025	Firsta Yufi Amarta Putri; East Java	Melliza Xaviera Putri Yulian; Jakarta SCR 1	Salma Ranggita Cahyariyani; South Sumatra 1	Rinanda Aprillya Maharani; East Kalimantan	Syafira Mardhiyah; Banten	Maharani Divaningtyas; Yogyakarta SR
Year & Edition	Puteri Indonesia	Puteri Indonesia Lingkungan	Puteri Indonesia Pariwisata	Puteri Indonesia Pendidikan	Puteri Indonesia Kebudayaan	Puteri Indonesia Digital & Inovasi
29th 2026	Agnes Aditya Rahajeng; Banten	Victoria Veronica Titisari Kosasieputri; Bali	Karina Moudy Widodo; Jakarta SCR 3	Gisella Belicia Alma Thesalonica Silalahi; Jakarta SCR 2	Nilam Onasis Sahputri; North Kalimantan	Glorya Stevany Yame Nayoan; Papua

=== Number of wins by province ===
Province	Titles	Year(s)
Jakarta SCR	10	1992, 1994, 1996, 2000, 2003, 2005, 2008, 2010, 2017, 2019
East Java	4	2007, 2014, 2020, 2025
Central Java	3	2006, 2011, 2015
West Java	2	2023, 2024
Bangka Belitung	2	2004, 2018
North Sulawesi	2	2001, 2016
West Sumatra	2	2002, 2013
Banten	1	2026
Bali	1	2022
Aceh	1	2009
Maluku	1	1995

== Gallery of winners ==
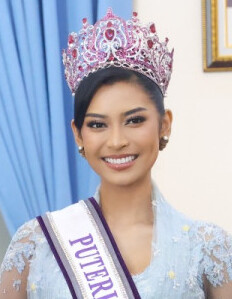
Puteri Indonesia 2026
Agnes Aditya Rahajeng, of Banten

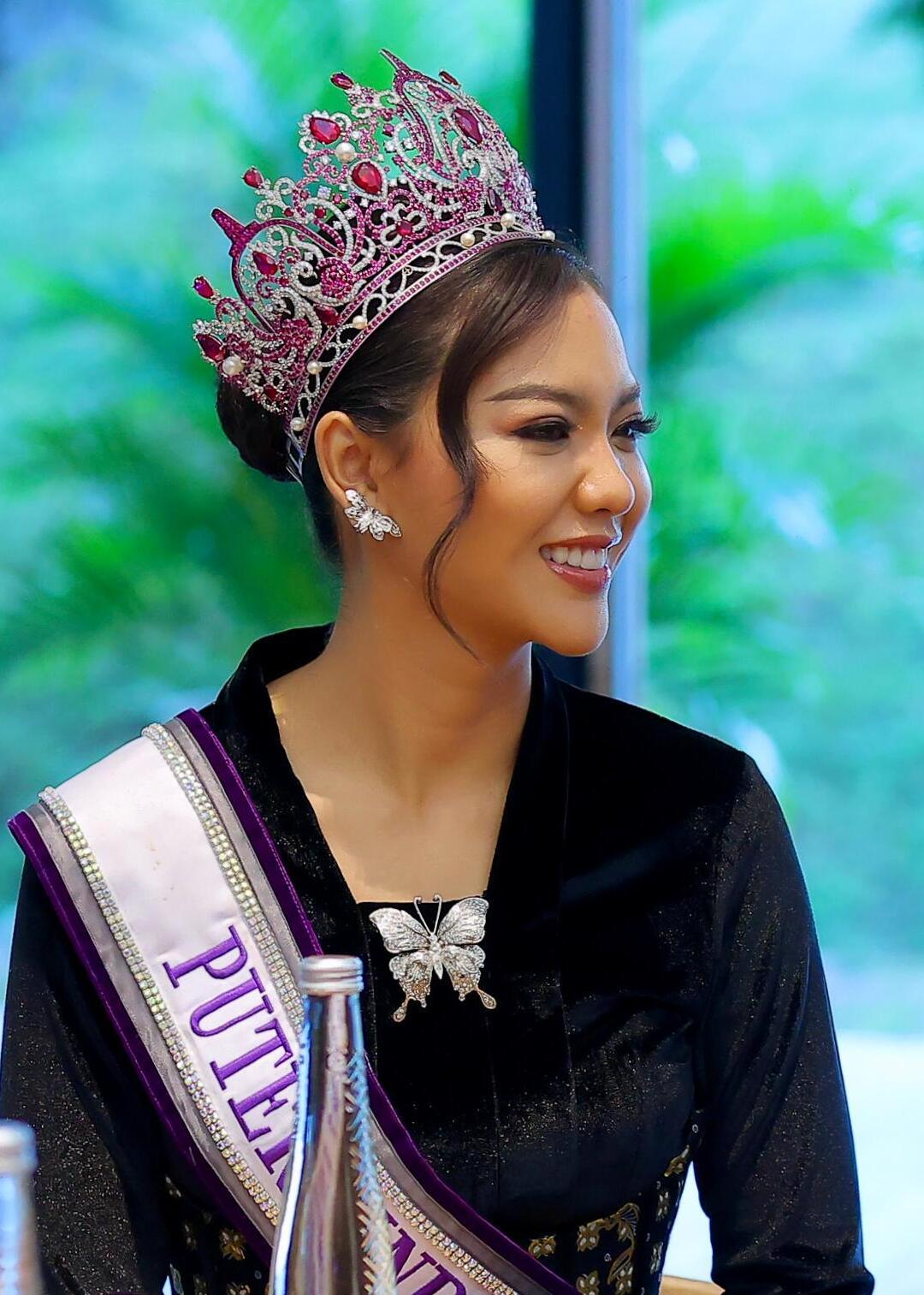
Puteri Indonesia 2025
Firsta Yufi Amarta Putri, of East Java

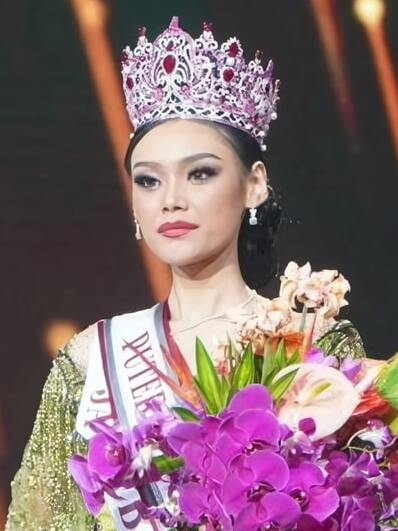
Puteri Indonesia 2024 & Miss Supranational 2024
Harashta Haifa Zahra, of West Java

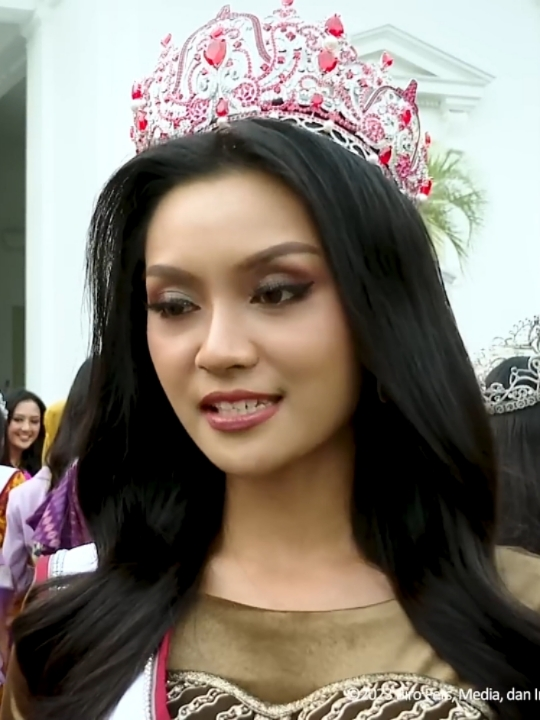
Puteri Indonesia 2023
Farhana Nariswari Wisandana, of West Java

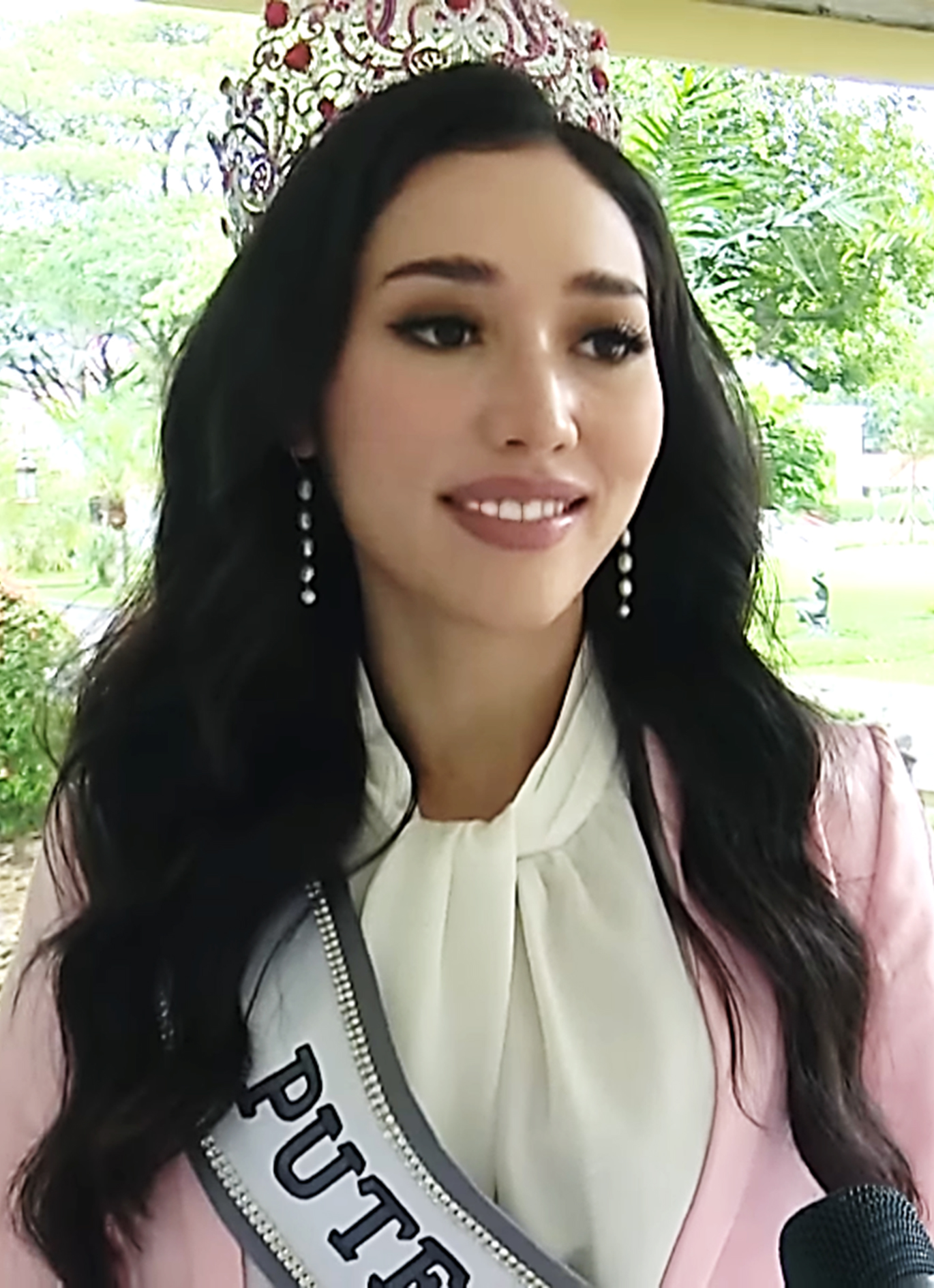
Puteri Indonesia 2022
Laksmi Shari De-Neefe Suardana, of Bali

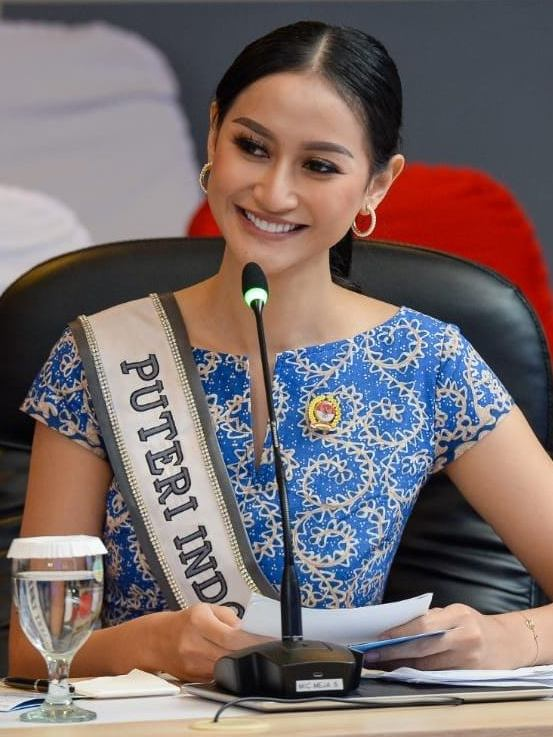
Puteri Indonesia 2020
Raden Roro Ayu Maulida Putri, of East Java

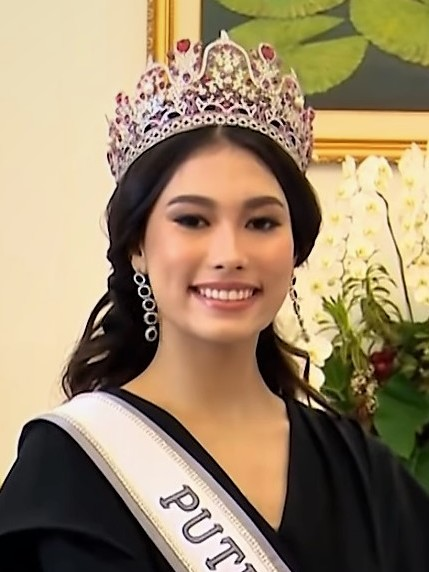
Puteri Indonesia 2019
Frederika Alexis Cull,
of Jakarta SCR

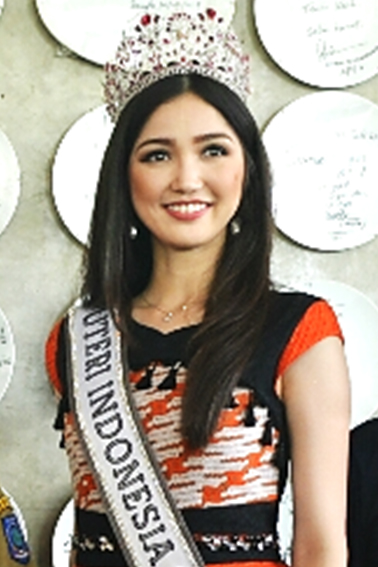
Puteri Indonesia 2018
Sonia Fergina Citra,
of Bangka Belitung

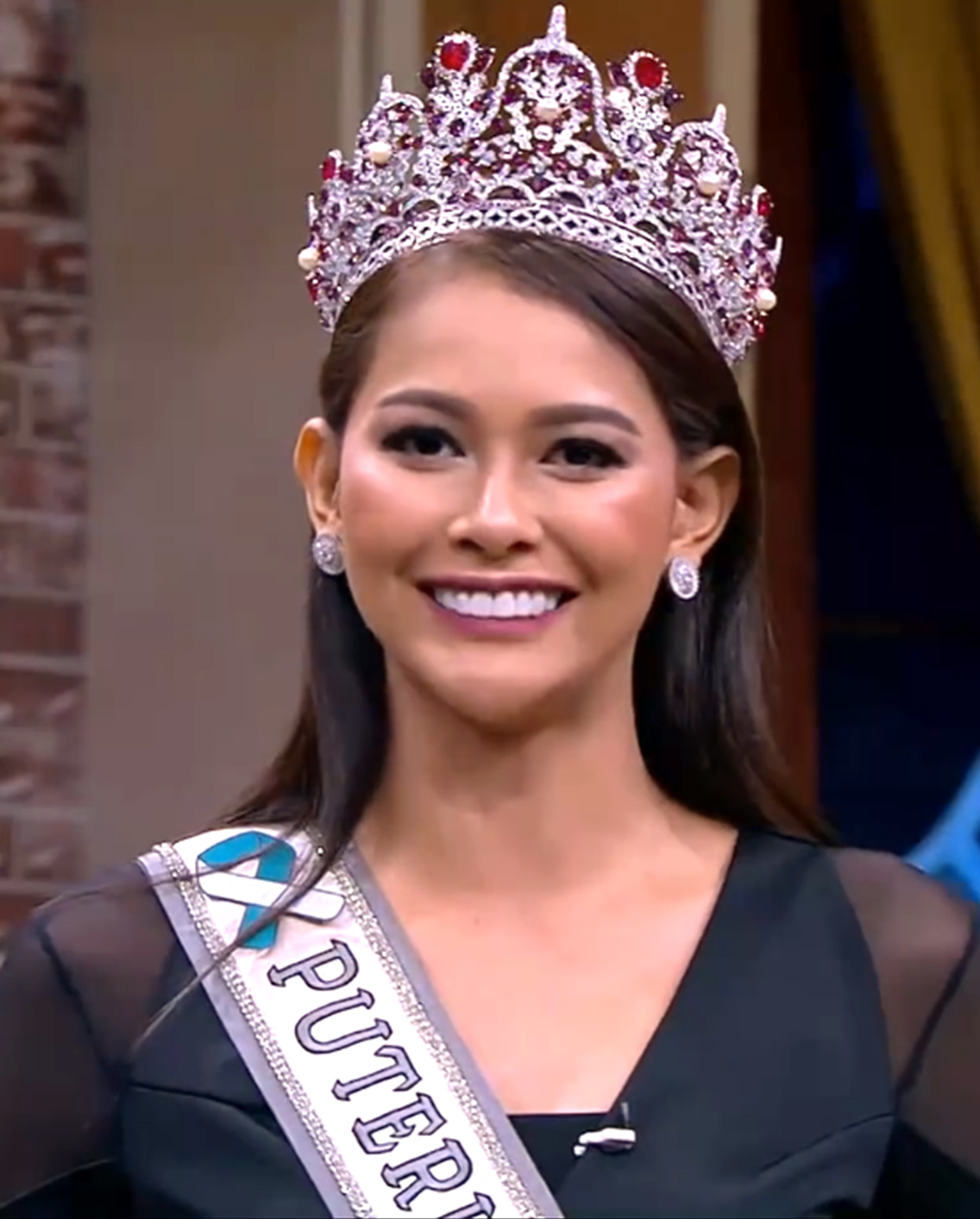
Puteri Indonesia 2017
Bunga Jelitha Ibrani,
of Jakarta SCR

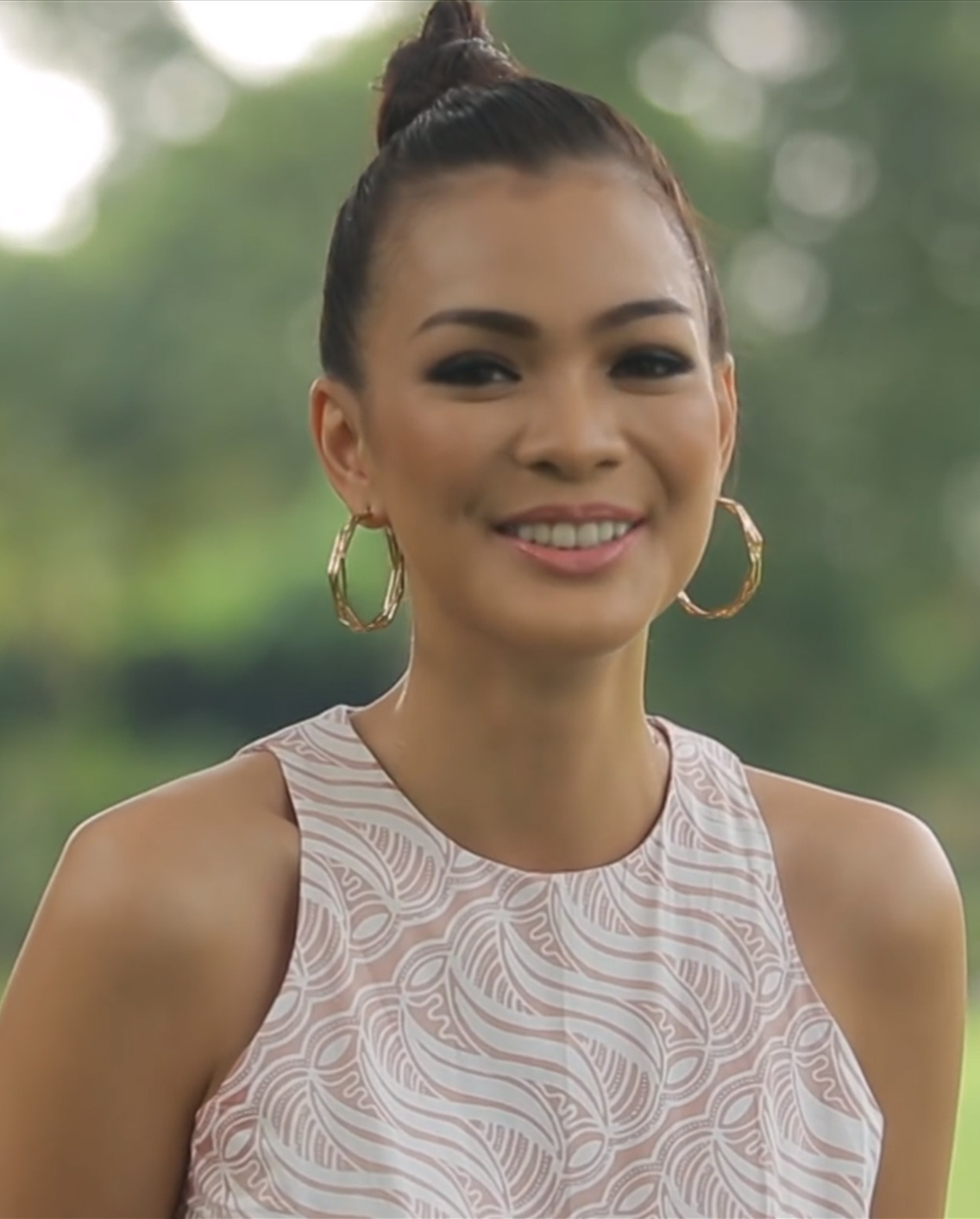
Puteri Indonesia 2016
Kezia Roslin Cikita Warouw,
of North Sulawesi

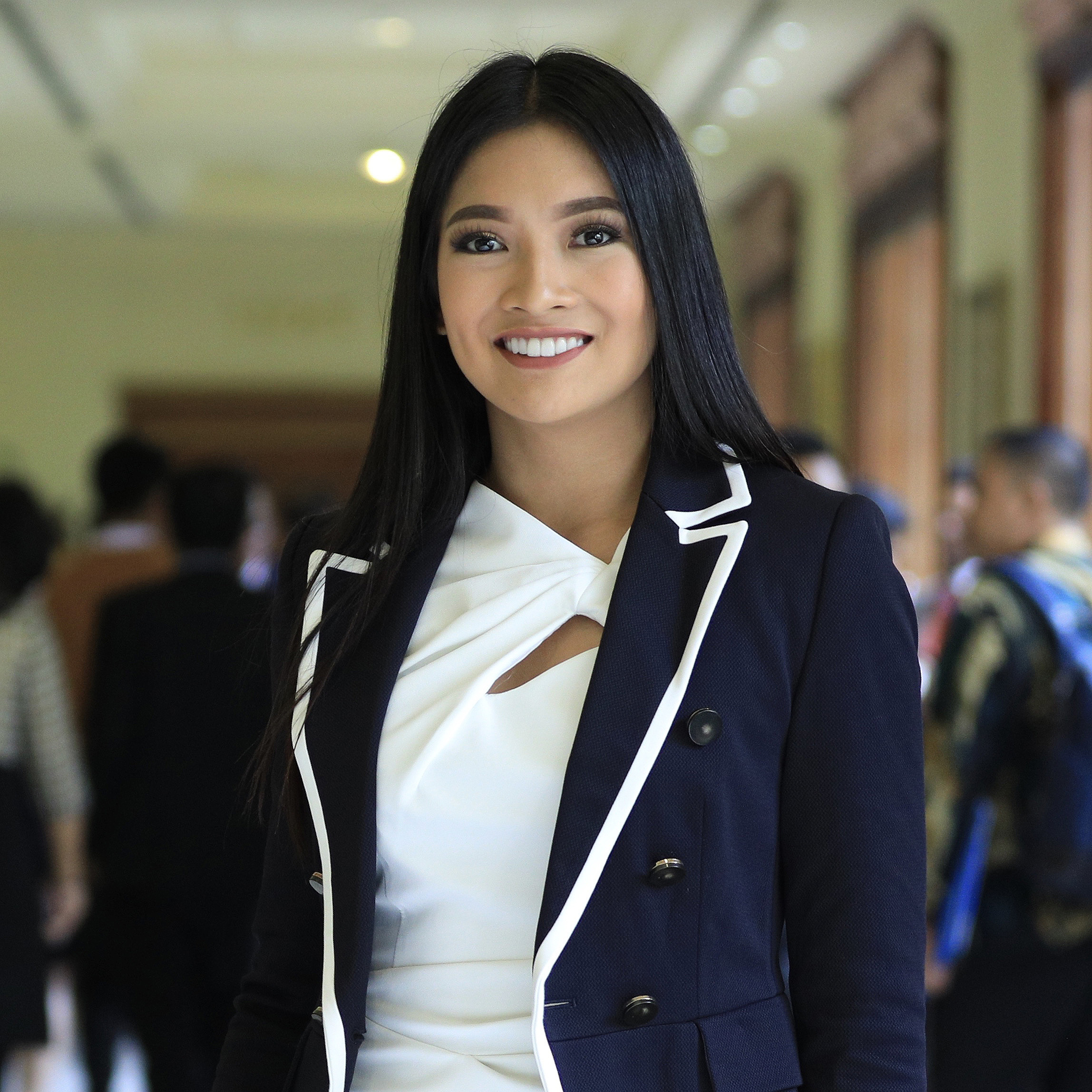
Puteri Indonesia 2015
Anindya Kusuma Putri,
of Central Java

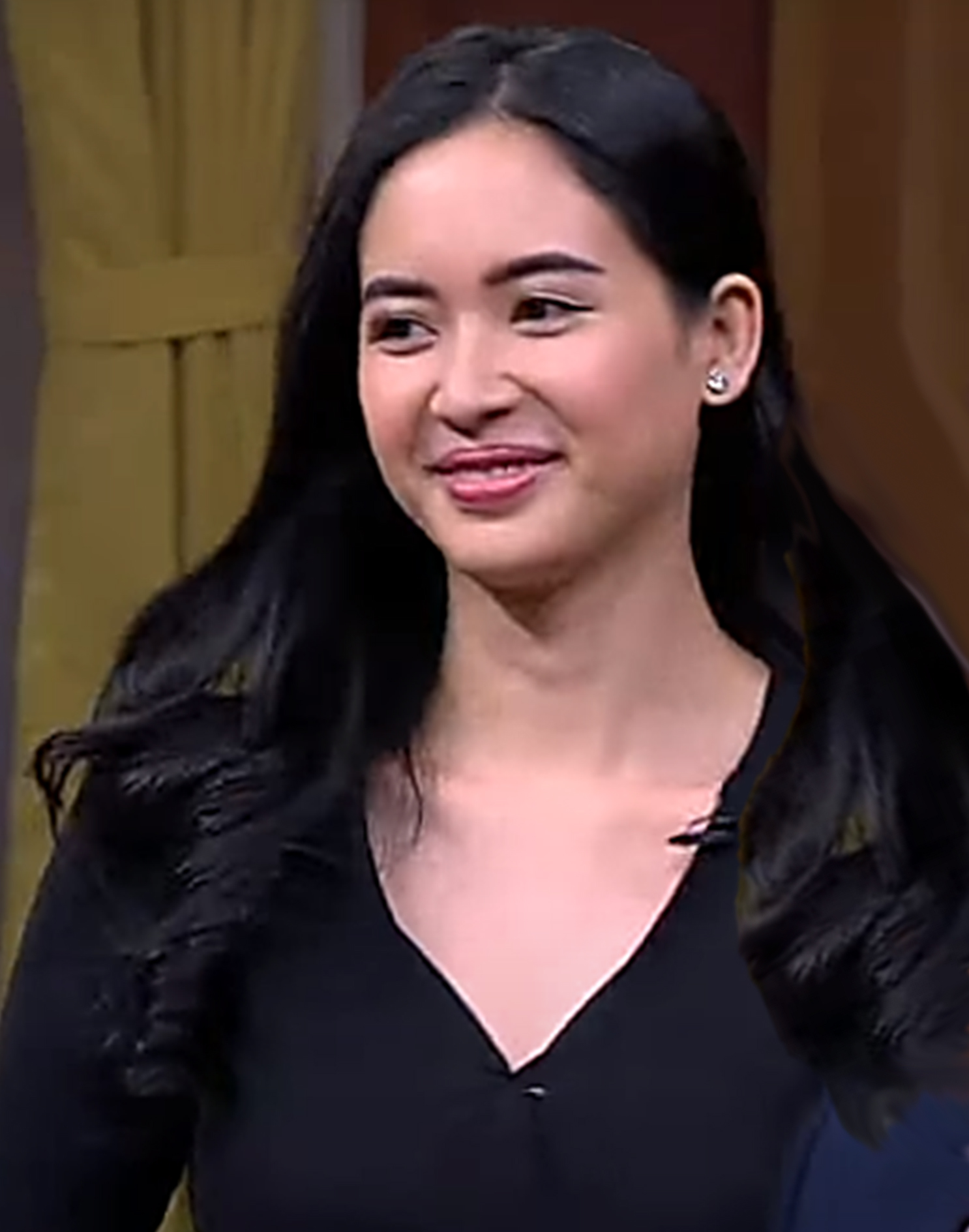
Puteri Indonesia 2014
Elvira Devinamira Wirayanti,
of East Java

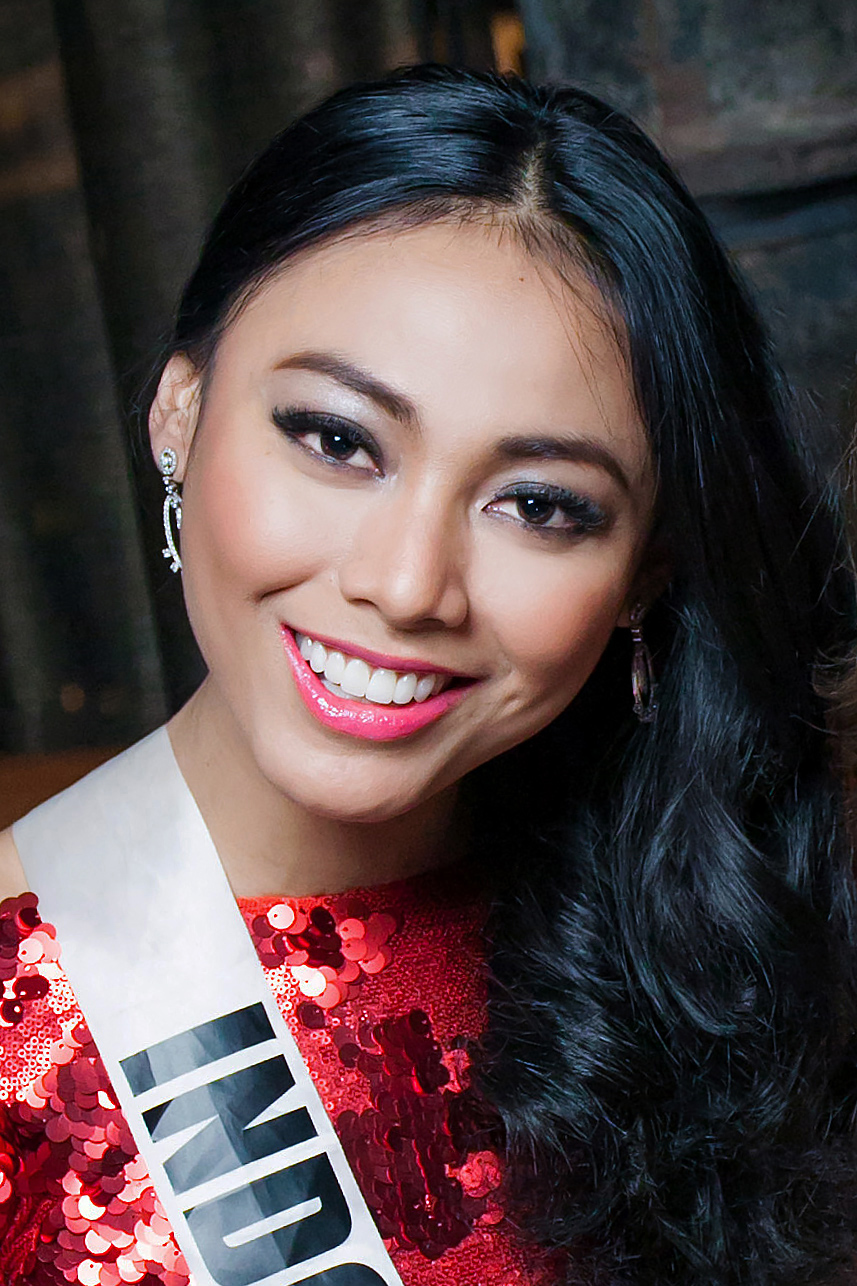
Puteri Indonesia 2013
Whulandary Herman,
of West Sumatra

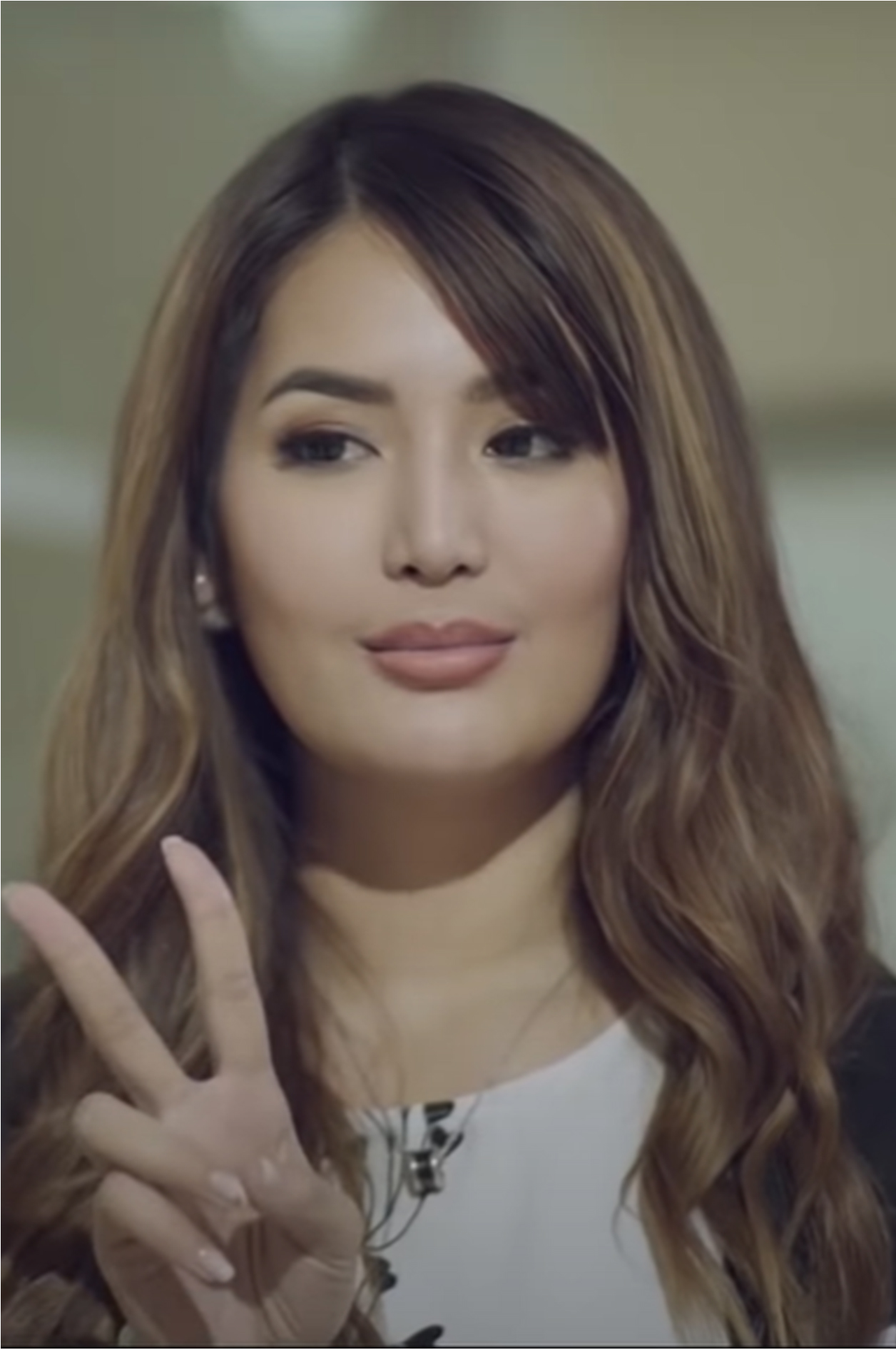
Puteri Indonesia 2011
Maria Selena Nurcahya,
of Central Java

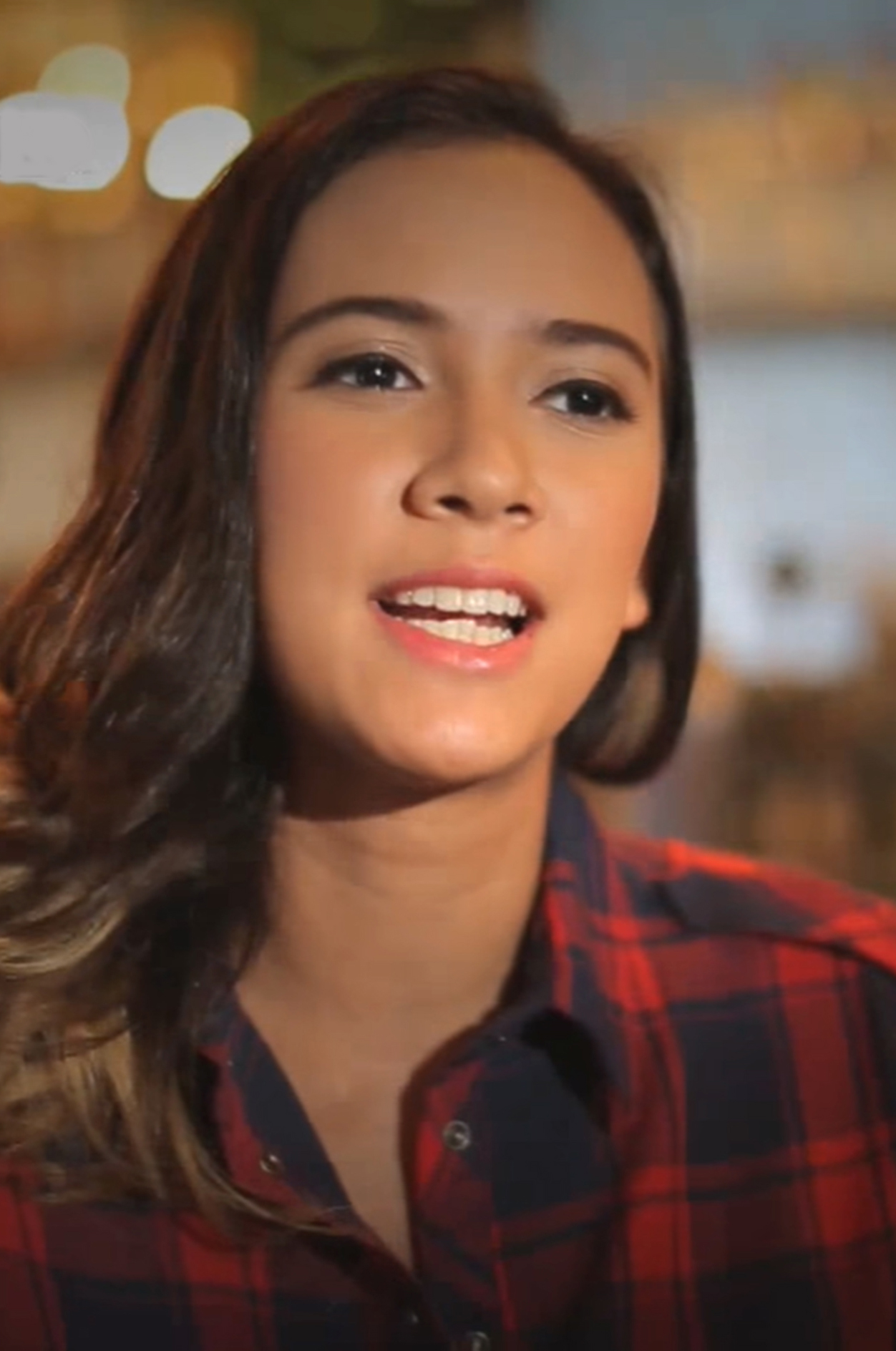
Puteri Indonesia 2010
Nadine Alexandra Dewi Ames,
of Jakarta SCR

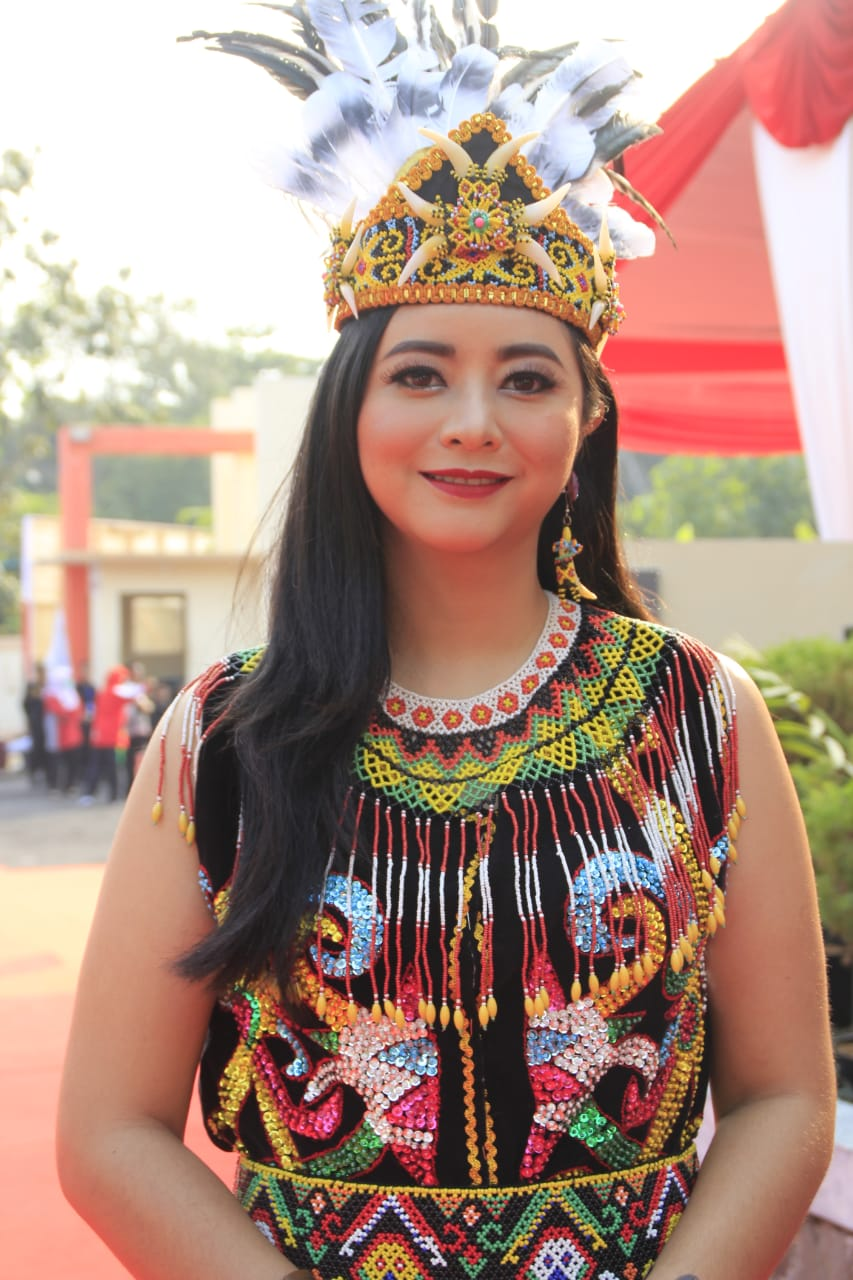
Puteri Indonesia 2009
Qory Sandioriva,
of Aceh

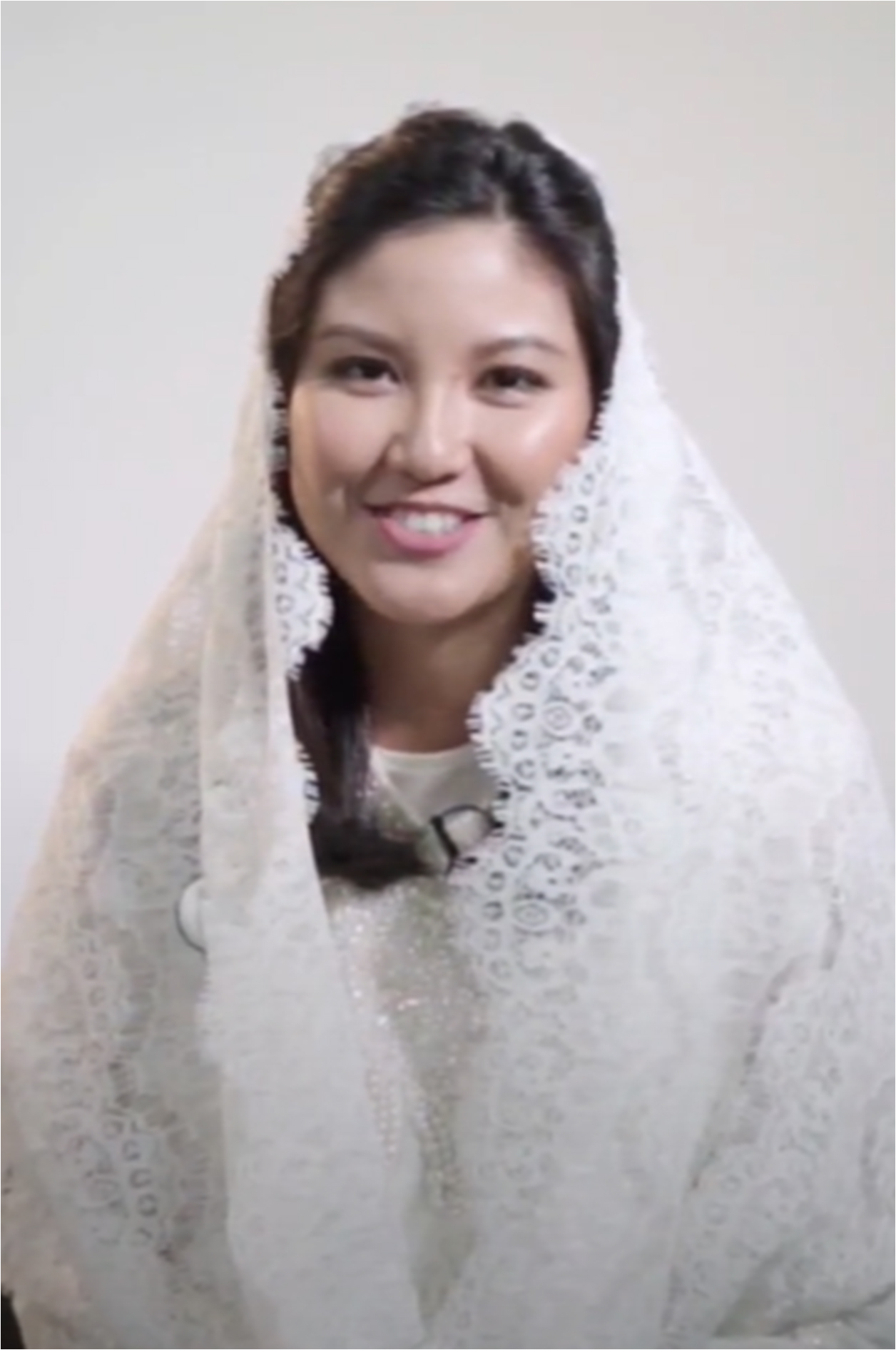
Puteri Indonesia 2008
Zivanna Letisha Siregar,
of Jakarta SCR

== Details ==
=== Puteri Indonesia ===
The winner of Puteri Indonesia pageant is crowned as Puteri Indonesia (Princess of Indonesia). Until 2022, it was established that the titleholder of Puteri Indonesia was to be sent to the Miss Universe pageant. Starting 2024, the titleholder of Puteri Indonesia will compete in an international beauty pageant that is decided by the Puteri Indonesia organization after the competition ends. The options include Miss International, Miss Supranational, Miss Cosmo, and Miss Charm.

Color key

- : Declared as Winner
- : Ended as runner-up
- : Ended as one of the finalists or semi-finalists
- : Ended as special awards winner
- No contest in 1993, 1997–1999, 2012, and 2021.

Year	Province	Puteri Indonesia	International pageant	Placement	Special awards
1992	Jakarta SCR	Indira Paramarini Sudiro^{[a]}	Miss Universe 1993	Withdrew during competition	
1994	Jakarta SCR	Venna Melinda Bruglia^{[b]}	Miss Universe 1994	Did not compete — but came as observer	
1995	Moluccas	Susanty Priscilla Adresina Manuhutu	Miss Universe 1995	Unplaced	
1996	Jakarta SCR 1	Alya Rohali^{[c]}	Miss Universe 1996	Unplaced	
2000	Jakarta SCR 3	Bernika Irnadianis Ifada	Did not compete		
2001	North Sulawesi	Angelina Patricia Pingkan Sondakh^{[d]}	Did not compete		
2002	West Sumatra	Melanie Putria Dewita Sari	Did not compete		
2003	Jakarta SCR 2	Dian Krishna Nawawi	Did not compete		
2004	Bangka Belitung	Artika Sari Devi Kusmayadi	Miss Universe 2005	Top 15	
2005	Jakarta SCR 4	Nadine Chandrawinata	Miss Universe 2006	Unplaced	
2006	Central Java	Agni Pratistha Kuswardono	Miss Universe 2007	Unplaced	
2007	East Java	Gracia Putri Raemawasti Mulyono	Miss Universe 2008	Unplaced	
2008	Jakarta SCR 6	Zivanna Letisha Siregar	Miss Universe 2009	Unplaced	
2009	Aceh	Qory Sandioriva	Miss Universe 2010	Unplaced	
2010	Jakarta SCR 4	Nadine Alexandra Dewi Ames	Miss Universe 2011	Unplaced	
2011	Central Java	Maria Selena Nurcahya	Miss Universe 2012	Unplaced	Best National Costume (Top 10)
2013	West Sumatra	Whulandary Herman^{[f]}	Miss Universe 2013	Top 16	Best National Costume (Top 5)
2014	East Java	Elvira Devinamira Wirayanti	Miss Universe 2014	Top 15	Best National Costume
2015	Central Java	Anindya Kusuma Putri	Miss Universe 2015	Top 15	
2016	North Sulawesi	Kezia Roslin Cikita Warouw	Miss Universe 2016	Top 13	Miss Phoenix Smile
2017	Jakarta SCR 5	Bunga Jelitha Ibrani^{[g]}	Miss Universe 2017	Unplaced	
2018	Bangka Belitung	Sonia Fergina Citra^{[h]}	Miss Universe 2018	Top 20	
2019	Jakarta SCR 1	Frederika Alexis Cull	Miss Universe 2019	Top 10	
2020	East Java	Raden Roro Ayu Maulida Putri^{[i]}	Miss Universe 2020	Top 21	
2022	Bali	Laksmi Shari De-Neefe Suardana	Miss Universe 2022	Unplaced	
2023	West Java 1	Farhana Nariswari Wisandana	Miss International 2023	Unplaced	Best in Evening Gown
2024	West Java	Harashta Haifa Zahra	Miss Supranational 2024	Miss Supranational 2024	Miss Talent (Winner); Supra Chat (Semi-finalist); Supra Influencer (Top 5)
2025	East Java	Firsta Yufi Amarta Putri	Miss Supranational 2025	Top 24	Miss Supranational Asia & Oceania
2026	Banten	Agnes Aditya Rahajeng	Miss Supranational 2026	Top 12	Miss Supranational Asia & Oceania; Supra Chat (Top 6); Supra Fan-Vote (Top 10); Supra Influencer (Top 20)

Notes

- ^{a} Indira Paramarini Sudiro won Miss ASEAN 1991 before winning Puteri Indonesia 1992. Indira Sudiro joined Miss Universe 1993, but a few days before the final night she was withdrawn because her participation became controversial in Indonesia.
- ^{b} Venna Melinda Bruglia was representing Indonesia as Observer at the Miss Universe 1994 in Manila, the Philippines.
- ^{c} Alya Rohali was the first Puteri Indonesia who reigned her title for four years.
- ^{d} Recently, Angelina Sondakh wasn't listed in Puteri Indonesia website and her title was revoked due to her corruption scandal which caused her to punished for 12 years in prison.
- ^{f} Whulandary Herman was the winner of Asian Top Model of the Year 2010 held in Hangzhou, China.
- ^{g} Bunga Jelitha Ibrani won Supermodel International 2011 and Guess Girl Southeast Asia 2015.
- ^{h} Sonia Fergina Citra went to China placing as the Top 6 at Miss Oriental Tourism 2012.
- ^{i} Raden Roro Ayu Maulida Putri was the winner of Face of Asia 2019 held in Seoul, South Korea.

=== Puteri Indonesia Lingkungan ===
The first runner-up of Puteri Indonesia competition is crowned as Puteri Indonesia Lingkungan (Environmental Princess of Indonesia). Until 2022, it was established that the titleholder of Puteri Indonesia Lingkungan was to be sent to Miss International pageant. Starting 2024, the titleholder of Puteri Indonesia Lingkungan will compete in an international beauty pageant that is decided by the Puteri Indonesia organization after the competition ends.

Color key

- : Declared as Winner
- : Ended as runner-up
- : Ended as one of the finalists or semi-finalists
- : Ended as special awards winner
- No contest in 1993, 1997–1999, 2012, and 2021.

Year	Province	Puteri Indonesia Lingkungan	International pageant	Placement	Special awards
2006	South Kalimantan	Ananda	Miss Asia Pacific 2007	Contest canceled	
2007	North Sumatra	Duma Riris Silalahi	Miss International 2008	Unplaced	
2008	Bali	Ayu Diandra Sari Tjakra	Miss International 2009	Unplaced	
2009	West Sumatra	Zukhriatul Hafizah Muhammad^{[a]}	Miss International 2010	Unplaced	Miss Friendship
2010	DI Yogyakarta	Reisa Kartikasari Brotoasmoro	Miss International 2011	Unplaced	
2011	East Java	Fiorenza Liza Elly Purnamasari^{[b]}	Miss International 2012	Unplaced	
2013	South Sumatra	Marisa Sartika Maladewi	Miss International 2013	Unplaced	
2014	South Sumatra	Elfin Pertiwi Rappa	Miss International 2014	Top 10	Best National Costume
2015	West Kalimantan	Chintya Fabyola	Miss International 2015	Unplaced	Best National Costume (Top 5)
2016	Lampung	Felicia Hwang Yi Xin	Miss International 2016	2nd Runner-up	Miss Best Dresser
2017	West Java	Kevin Lilliana	Miss International 2017	Miss International 2017	Miss Best Dresser; Missosology's Choice Award; Miss Panasonic, Sponsor (1st Runner-up)
2018	Banten	Vania Fitryanti Herlambang	Miss International 2018	Top 15	Miss Panasonic Beauty Ambassador
2019	North Sulawesi	Jolene Marie Cholock-Rotinsulu^{[c]}	Miss International 2019	Top 8	Miss Panasonic Beauty Ambassador; Missosology's Choice Award
2020	Bali	Putu Ayu Saraswati	Miss International 2021	Contest canceled	
2022	Jakarta SCR 5	Cindy May McGuire	Miss International 2022	Unplaced	
2023	East Java	Yasinta Aurellia	Miss Supranational 2023	Top 24	Miss Talent (Top 29); Supra Fan-Vote (Top 10); Supra Influencer (Top 7)
2024	DI Yogyakarta	Sophie Kirana	Miss International 2024	4th Runner-up	Best in Evening Gown (Top 5)
2025	Jakarta SCR 1	Melliza Xaviera Putri Yulian	Miss International 2025	3rd Runner-up	
2026	Bali	Victoria Veronica Titisari Kosasieputri	Miss International 2026	TBD	TBD

Notes

- ^{a} Zukhriatul Hafizah Muhammad is the owner of Beauty pageant camp in Indonesia named Ratu Sejagad, who is trained Miss Universe 2018 Top 20 – Sonia Fergina Citra and Miss Universe 2019 Top 10 – Frederika Alexis Cull.
- ^{b} Liza Elly Purnamasari was won Miss Earth Indonesia in 2010 before winning Puteri Indonesia Lingkungan 2011.
- ^{c} Jolene Marie Cholock-Rotinsulu was won 1st runner-up and Miss Photogenic on Miss Celebrity Indonesia 2010 before winning Puteri Indonesia Lingkungan 2019.

=== Puteri Indonesia Pariwisata ===
The second runner-up of Puteri Indonesia competition is crowned as Puteri Indonesia Pariwisata (Tourism Princess of Indonesia). Until 2022, it was established that the titleholder of Puteri Indonesia Pariwisata was to be sent to Miss Supranational pageant. Starting 2024, the titleholder of Puteri Indonesia Pariwisata will compete in an international beauty pageant that is decided by the Puteri Indonesia organization after the competition ends.

Color key

- : Declared as Winner
- : Ended as runner-up
- : Ended as one of the finalists or semi-finalists
- : Ended as special awards winner
- No contest in 1993, 1997–1999, 2012, and 2021.

Year	Province	Puteri Indonesia Pariwisata	International pageant	Placement	Special awards
2006	Jakarta SCR 5	Rahma Landy Sjahruddin	Miss International 2007	Top 15	
2007	Jakarta SCR 4	Ika Fiyonda Putri	Miss Asia Pacific 2008	Did not compete	
2008	DI Yogyakarta	Anggi Mahesti	Miss Asia Pacific 2009	Contest canceled	
2009	North Maluku	Isti Ayu Pratiwi	Miss Asia Pacific 2010	Contest canceled	
2010	Gorontalo	Alessandra Khadijah Usman^{[a]}	Miss Asia Pacific World 2011	1st Runner-up	Best Style Dress Award
2011	South Sulawesi	Andi Tenri Gusti Harnum Utari Natassa	Miss Asia Pacific World 2012	Top 15	Best National Costume; Best Talent (2nd Runner-up)
2013	Bali	Cokorda Istri Krisnanda Widani	Miss Supranational 2013	3rd Runner-up	
2014	DI Yogyakarta	Lily Estelita Liana	Miss Supranational 2014	Unplaced	Best National Costume
2015	North Sulawesi	Gresya Amanda Maaliwuga^{[b]}	Miss Supranational 2015	Unplaced	Best National Costume; Best Evening Gown (Top 10)
2016	West Sumatra	Intan Aletrinö	Miss Supranational 2016	Top 10	Fan-Vote Winner; Miss Elegance
2017	East Nusa Tenggara	Karina Nadila Niab	Miss Supranational 2017	Top 25	Best in Evening Gown; Fan-Vote Winner
2018	West Kalimantan	Wilda Octaviana Situngkir	Miss Supranational 2018	3rd Runner-up	Best National Costume; Supra Model of Asia; Global Beauties Choice Award
2019	West Java	Jesica Fitriana Martasari	Miss Supranational 2019	2nd Runner-up	Supra Fan-Vote Winner; Women of Substance; Best National Costume (2nd Runner-up)
2020	Central Java	Jihane Almira Chedid^{[c]}	Miss Supranational 2021	Top 12	Miss Supranational Asia; Best National Costume; Supra Fan-Vote Winner; Miss Elegance (Top 11); Supra Chat (Top 8)
2022	East Java	Adinda Cresheilla	Miss Supranational 2022	3rd Runner-up	Supra Chat Winner; Miss Elegance (Top 15); Miss Talent (Top 6); Supra Fan-Vote (Top 10); Supra Influencer (Top 42); Supra Model of the Year (Top 11)
2023	Lampung	Lulu Zaharani Krisna Widodo	Miss Charm 2024	Did not compete	
2024	Bali	Ketut Permata Juliastrid Sari	Miss Cosmo 2024	Miss Cosmo 2024	Cosmo Beauty Icon
2025	South Sumatra 1	Salma Ranggita Cahyariyani	Miss Cosmo 2025	Top 21	Cosmo Carnival Show (Top 17); Cosmo Impactful Beauty (Top 10)
2026	Jakarta SCR 3	Karina Moudy Widodo	Miss Cosmo 2026	TBD	TBD

Notes

- ^{a} Alessandra Usman was renamed as the 1st Runner-up of Miss Asia Pacific World 2011 after the pageant did controversy with the grand winner. Usman was originally crowned as the 3rd Runner-up.
- ^{b} The quarter finalist on the final show was Top 20. The official results were revealed after Final Show on Miss Supranational website, Gresya Amanda Maaliwuga was in the Top 30 (Ranked on 24th).
- ^{c} Jihane Almira Chedid was competed in Guess Girl Search South East Asia 2015 where she placed in Top 15, together with Puteri Indonesia 2017 alumni, Bunga Jelitha as the winner. She is also placed in Top 10 Nylon Magazine Face Off 2016.

=== Puteri Indonesia Pendidikan ===
The third runner-up of Puteri Indonesia competition was crowned as Puteri Indonesia Perdamaian (Peace Princess of Indonesia) before it was renamed as Puteri Indonesia Pendidikan dan Kebudayaan (Education and Culture Princess of Indonesia) in 2024 and Puteri Indonesia Pendidikan (Education Princess of Indonesia) in 2025. The titleholder of Puteri Indonesia Perdamaian was sent to Miss Grand International pageant in 2016 and 2017. Starting 2024, the titleholder of Puteri Indonesia Pendidikan will compete in an international beauty pageant that is decided by the Puteri Indonesia organization after the competition ends.

Color key

- : Declared as winner
- : Ended as runner-up
- : Ended as one of the finalists or semi-finalists
- : Ended as special awards winner
- Declared as Puteri Indonesia Pendidikan dan Kebudayaan in 2024.

Year	Province	Puteri Indonesia Pendidikan	International pageant	Placement	Special awards
Declared as Puteri Indonesia Perdamaian
2016	North Sumatra	Ariska Putri Pertiwi	Miss Grand International 2016	Miss Grand International 2016	Best National Costume; People's Choice Award (1st Runner-up)
2017	Central Java	Dea Goesti Rizkita Koswara	Miss Grand International 2017	Top 10	Best National Costume; People's Choice Award; Best in Arrival; Best in Photo Shoot (Top 10); Best Swimsuit (Top 10)
2018	DI Yogyakarta	Dilla Fadiela	None	Did not compete at international pageant	
Declared as Puteri Indonesia Pendidikan
2024	East Java	Melati Tedja	Miss Charm 2024	Top 6	Best Social Media
2025	East Kalimantan	Rinanda Aprillya Maharani	Miss Charm 2025	2nd Runner-up	
2026	Jakarta SCR 2	Gisella Belicia Alma Thesalonica Silalahi	Miss Charm 2026	TBD	TBD

=== Puteri Indonesia Kebudayaan ===
The fourth runner-up of Puteri Indonesia competition was crowned as Puteri Indonesia Kebudayaan (Cultural Princess of Indonesia) starting in 2025.

Color key

- : Declared as winner
- : Ended as runner-up
- : Ended as one of the finalists or semi-finalists
- : Ended as special awards winner

Year	Province	Puteri Indonesia Kebudayaan	International pageant	Placement	Special awards
2025	Banten	Syafira Mardhiyah	None	Did not compete at international pageant	
2026	North Kalimantan	Nilam Onasis Sahputri	None	Did not compete at international pageant	

=== Puteri Indonesia Inovasi dan Teknologi ===
The fifth runner-up of Puteri Indonesia competition was crowned as Puteri Indonesia Inovasi dan Teknologi (Innovation and Technology Princess of Indonesia) since 2025.

Color key

- : Declared as winner
- : Ended as runner-up
- : Ended as one of the finalists or semi-finalists
- : Ended as special awards winner

Year	Province	Puteri Indonesia Inovasi dan Teknologi	International pageant	Placement	Special awards
2025	Yogyakarta SCR	Maharani Divaningtyas	None	Did not compete at international pageant	
2026	Papua	Glorya Stevany Yame Nayoan	None	Did not compete at international pageant	

=== Runners-up and finalists ===
Year	1st runner-up	2nd runner-up	3rd runner-up	4th runner-up	5th runner-up
1992	Caroline Octavia; Jakarta SCR	Veria Syanusi; Lampung	Not awarded		
1994	Irma Rahmayani Lubis; North Sumatra	Valentina Tohir; South Sumatra	Not awarded		
1995	Rosa Andriani Rai; Jakarta SCR 4	Dian Cahyani; Jambi	Not awarded		
1996	Dyah Palipur Yudhawati; Central Java	Gusria Setiani; West Sumatra	Not awarded		
2000	Mandy Andriani Tutuarima; DI Yogyakarta	Anak Agung Ayu Inten Leony Pratiwi; Bali	Not awarded		
2001	Helena Yorantina Souissa; Mollucas	Ni Wayan Eka Ciptasari; Bali	Not awarded		
2002	Meutia Taurissa Susmex; Aceh	Sagita Shinta Pratiwi Wacik; Jakarta SCR 2	Not awarded		
2003	Sisca Amelia; West Kalimantan	Melisa Yasmin Kapitan; Moluccas	Not awarded		
2004	Nadia Mulya; Banten	Novia Isabiet Monoarfa; Gorontalo	Not awarded		
2005	Lindi Cistia Prabha; DI Yogyakarta	Valerina Daniel; Jakarta SCR 6	Not awarded		
2006	Awarded as Puteri Indonesia Lingkungan	Awarded as Puteri Indonesia Pariwisata	Not awarded		
2007	Awarded as Puteri Indonesia Lingkungan	Awarded as Puteri Indonesia Pariwisata	Not awarded		
2008	Awarded as Puteri Indonesia Lingkungan	Awarded as Puteri Indonesia Pariwisata	Not awarded		
2009	Awarded as Puteri Indonesia Lingkungan	Awarded as Puteri Indonesia Pariwisata	Not awarded		
2010	Awarded as Puteri Indonesia Lingkungan	Awarded as Puteri Indonesia Pariwisata	Not awarded		
2011	Awarded as Puteri Indonesia Lingkungan	Awarded as Puteri Indonesia Pariwisata	Not awarded		
2013	Awarded as Puteri Indonesia Lingkungan	Awarded as Puteri Indonesia Pariwisata	Novia Indriani Mamuaja; North Sulawesi	Nadia Ingrida Gani; Jakarta SCR 3	Not awarded
2014	Awarded as Puteri Indonesia Lingkungan	Awarded as Puteri Indonesia Pariwisata	Not awarded		
2015	Awarded as Puteri Indonesia Lingkungan	Awarded as Puteri Indonesia Pariwisata	Not awarded		
2016	Awarded as Puteri Indonesia Lingkungan	Awarded as Puteri Indonesia Pariwisata	Awarded as Puteri Indonesia Perdamaian	Claudia Dara Chaerunnisa; Jakarta SCR 1	Not awarded
2017	Awarded as Puteri Indonesia Lingkungan	Awarded as Puteri Indonesia Pariwisata	Awarded as Puteri Indonesia Perdamaian	Syella Afsari; Jambi	Putri Mentari Sitanggang; North Sumatra
2018	Awarded as Puteri Indonesia Lingkungan	Awarded as Puteri Indonesia Pariwisata	Awarded as Puteri Indonesia Perdamaian	Berliana Permatasari; South Sumatra	Kidung Paramadita; Central Java
2019	Awarded as Puteri Indonesia Lingkungan	Awarded as Puteri Indonesia Pariwisata	Annisa Fitriana; West Sumatra	Helvanda Herman; South Sumatra	Maria Hostiana Napitupulu; East Nusa Tenggara
2020	Awarded as Puteri Indonesia Lingkungan	Awarded as Puteri Indonesia Pariwisata	Louise Kalista Wilson-Iskandar; West Sumatra	Angel Virginia Boelan; East Nusa Tenggara	Yoan Clara Teken; Maluku
2022	Awarded as Puteri Indonesia Lingkungan	Awarded as Puteri Indonesia Pariwisata	Melanie Theresia Berentz; West Java	Chrissy Fransisca Olivyana Rugian; Banten 1	Arina Rezkyana Arfa; Southeast Sulawesi
2023	Awarded as Puteri Indonesia Lingkungan	Awarded as Puteri Indonesia Pariwisata	Dinda Nur Safira; Yogyakarta SR	Puteri Modiyanti; Jakarta SCR 2	Patricia Bella Olina; Bangka Belitung 2
2024	Awarded as Puteri Indonesia Lingkungan	Awarded as Puteri Indonesia Pariwisata	Awarded as Puteri Indonesia Pendidikan	Ghina Raihanah Tadjoedin; Jakarta SCR 1	Latisa Safa Maura; Banten

== Before Puteri Indonesia ==
Color key

- : Declared as Winner
- : Ended as runner-up
- : Ended as one of the finalists or semi-finalists
- : Ended as Special awards winner

Before Puteri Indonesia under PT Mustika Ratu Tbk., the Indonesia's representations were crowned by national pageants called Ratu Indonesia, Miss Indonesia, and Miss Jawa. Andy Nurhayati who owned Andi Beauty Institute Jakarta was the key person who took the franchise for Miss Universe, Miss World, Miss International, Miss Asia Pacific, etc. in Indonesia. Began 1980s, the selection held in closed selection by her, since there was banning system from the government about beauty pageants.

- Miss Jawa (Java): This beauty contest also took over the Miss International license at the start of Miss International's debut from Oscar J. Meinhardt in the United States.
- Miss Indonesia: The first edition was held in 1969 where since 1970 there was no Miss Indonesia program, until 2005 Mrs. Liliana Tanoesoedibjo held the Miss Indonesia election for the first time in the modern era.
- Ratu Indonesia: This beauty event was first held in 1971 and transformed into Puteri Indonesia in the 4th year of implementation, 1975. It had a hiatus for 1 year in 1974 and was officially closed in 1978. During the program there were 3 main titles at Puteri Indonesia in that time: Puteri Indonesia as the Main Winner, Puteri Duta Indonesia as the 1st Runner-up, and Puteri Pariwisata Indonesia as the 2nd Runner-up. In 1992, Mrs. Mooryati Soedibyo began developing the Puteri Indonesia program and officially holds the license for Miss Universe and several other licenses.
- Closed Selection: Andy Nurhayati, as the owner of the Miss Universe license and various world beauty pageants, began trying to carry out a closed selection program to send representatives to several beauty pageants such as Miss Universe. This is done through casting and around 5 winners are selected between 1978 and 1983.

Year	National Pageant	Province	Winner	Province	1st Runner-up	Province	2nd Runner-up
1969	1st edition ― Miss Indonesia	West Java	Irma Priscilla Hadisurya	North Sulawesi	Louise Maria Dominique Maengkom	Jakarta SCR	Nany Hardjodisastro
1971	1st edition ― Ratu Indonesia	West Java	Herni Sunarja	Jakarta SCR	Endang Triwahjuni	West Java	Melinda Susilarini Mohammad
1972	2nd edition ― Ratu Indonesia	Jakarta SCR	Irene Rebecca Soetanto	East Java	Setyawati Samsidin	Jakarta SCR	Early Burhan
1973	3rd edition ― Ratu Indonesia	Jakarta SCR	Lydia Arlini Wahab	Central Java	Liza Sindoro	DI Yogyakarta	Wiwid Nurwidyohening
Year	National Pageant	Province	Winner	Province	1st RU declared as Puteri Duta Indonesia	Province	2nd RU declared as Puteri Pariwisata Indonesia
1975	4th edition ― Puteri Indonesia (Rebranded from Ratu Indonesia)	Jakarta SCR	Fransisca Warastoeti	North Sulawesi	Maureen Tenges	Central Java	Yayuk Rahayu Sosiawati
1976	5th edition ― Puteri Indonesia	West Java	Juliarti Rahayu Gunawan	Jakarta SCR	Treesje Nugraheni Ratri Astuti	North Sumatra	Lily Chaerani Nainggolan
1977	6th edition ― Puteri Indonesia	South Sumatra	Siti Mirza Nuria Arifin	Central Java	Indri Hapsari Soeharto	Jakarta SCR	Andi Nana Riwayatie Basoamier
Year	National Pageant	Province	Miss Universe Indonesia	Province	Miss World Indonesia	―	―
1982	Closed selection	East Java	Sri Yulianti Soemardjo	South Sulawesi	Andi Botenri	N/A	
1983	Closed selection	South Sulawesi	Andi Botenri	Jakarta SCR	Titi Dwijayati	N/A	

=== Miss Universe Indonesia ===
Year	Province	Miss Universe Indonesia	National title	Placement	Special awards	Notes
Andi Beauty Institute Jakarta / Andy Nurhayati directorship — a franchise holder to Miss Universe between 1974–1983
1974	West Java	Nia Kurniasih Ardikoesoema	Ratu Indonesia 1973 (Ratu Jawa Barat)	Unplaced		After winning Mojang Bandung 1973, in 1974 Nia was designated as Miss Universe Indonesia 1974 by Andi Beauty Institute Jakarta (as the national holder for Indonesia). She also received the award from Indonesian World Records Museum as the Beauty Pioneer who competed in Miss Universe competition. Nia competed at Ratu Indonesia 1973, represented Jawa Barat at the pageant and won Miss Congeniality award.
1975	Jakarta SCR	Lydia Arlini Wahab	Ratu Indonesia 1973	Unplaced		The Ratu Indonesia 1973 — winner who also represented Indonesia at Miss Asia Pacific 1974, Queen of the Pacific 1974, and Miss International 1974 before competing at Miss Universe 1975. Lydia also was designated as Miss Universe Indonesia 1974 by Andi Beauty Institute Jakarta (as the national holder for Indonesia), since in 1975 there was no specific contest to Miss Universe.
1976	West Java	Juliarti Rahayu Gunawan	Puteri Indonesia 1976	Unplaced		Juliarti was the youngest Indonesia's queen who competed at Miss Universe in the 16 years of age. In that moment she was a model who selected as the main title Puteri Indonesia 1976 for Miss Universe.
1977	South Sumatera	Siti Mirza Nuria Arifin	Puteri Indonesia 1977	Unplaced		Winning Puteri Indonesia 1977, Siti was designated as Miss Universe Indonesia 1977 by Andi Beauty Institute Jakarta (as the national holder for Indonesia).
Did not compete between 1978—1979
1980	South Sulawesi	Andi Nana Riwayatie Basoamier	Puteri Pariwisata Indonesia 1977 (2nd Runner-up at Puteri Indonesia 1977)	Unplaced	Swimsuit Score (57th) recorded by Miss Universe Incorporation LIVE program	There was no Puteri Indonesia contest, Nana was designated by Andi Beauty Institute Jakarta (as the national holder for Indonesia). She was placed as the 2nd Runner-up or in that moment called Puteri Pariwisata Pariwisata 1977 at Puteri Indonesia pageant.
1981	Jakarta SCR	Rosje Soeratman	Gadis Teladan 1981	Did not compete		After winning Gadis Teladan 1981 title nationally, Rosje Soeratman was designated as Miss Universe Indonesia 1981 but her trip to Miami, Florida, USA did not successfully run well. Her visa did not approve and another way she was reported she was being a victim of an accident.
1982	East Java	Sri Yulianti Soemardjo	Miss Universe Indonesia 1982	Unplaced	Swimsuit Score (71st) recorded by Miss Universe Incorporation LIVE program	In 1982, there are 5 winners who scheduled to represent Indonesia at international pageants. Sri was the main winner who represented Indonesia at Miss Universe 1982. She titled as Miss Universe Indonesia 1982, together with other titleholders.
1983	South Sulawesi	Andi Botenri	Miss Universe Indonesia 1983	Unplaced		In 1982, Andi was one the 5 winners at Miss Indonesia 1982, as Miss World Indonesia. She competed at Miss World 1982 and was designated as Miss Universe Indonesia 1983 by Andi Beauty Institute Jakarta (as the national holder for Indonesia).

=== Miss World Indonesia ===
Year	Province	Miss World Indonesia	National title	Placement	Special awards	Notes
Andi Beauty Institute Jakarta / Andy Nurhayati directorship — a franchise holder to Miss World between 1982–1983
1982	Jakarta SCR	Andi Botenri	Miss World Indonesia 1982	Unplaced		In 1982, Andi was one the 5 winners at Miss Indonesia 1982, titled Miss World Indonesia. She also was appointed by Andi Beauty Institute Jakarta to compete at Miss Universe 1983, a year later after Miss World competition in London, England, Great Britain.
1983	Jakarta SCR	Titi Dwijayati	Miss World Indonesia 1983	Unplaced		In 1983 Titi was designated by Andi Beauty Institute Jakarta (as the national holder for Indonesia) as Miss World Indonesia 1983. She flied internationally with Andi Botenri who also competed at Miss Universe in the same year.

=== Miss International Indonesia ===
Year	Province	Miss International Indonesia	National title	Placement	Special awards	Notes
1960	Jakarta SCR	Wiana Sulastini	Miss Jawa 1960	Unplaced		Miss Jawa 1960 ― There was no specific contest for Miss International beauty pageant, since in 1960 Miss International was held for the first time by Oscar J. Meinhardt in the United States.
Did not compete between 1961—1967
1968	Jakarta SCR	Sylvia Taliwongso	Miss Jawa 1967	Unplaced		In 1967 an entrepreneur, Simon Petrus Goni approached the government to manage the first Miss Indonesia contest. In that year he planned to send the main winner to Miss International beauty pageant. But Sylvia was designated to compete at Miss International 1968, a year after approaching segment to the government.
1969	West Java	Irma Priscilla Hardisurya	Miss Indonesia 1969	Unplaced		Irma was the First Miss Indonesia ― winner in history. She won at Hotel Indonesia and was sent to Miss International 1969 and also, Miss Asia Pacific 1970 by Miss Indonesia team in 1969.
1970	North Sulawesi	Louise Maria Dominique Maengkom	1st Runner-up at Miss Indonesia 1969	Unplaced		Louise was a runner-up of Miss Indonesia 1969, she was appointed as Miss International Indonesia 1970 by Miss Indonesia team.
Did not compete between 1971—1973
1974	Jakarta SCR	Lydia Arlini Wahab	Ratu Indonesia 1973	Unplaced		The Ratu Indonesia 1973 — winner who also represented Indonesia at Miss Asia Pacific 1974, Queen of the Pacific 1974, and Miss Universe 1975.
1975	Central Java	Yayuk Rahayu Sosiawati	Puteri Pariwisata Indonesia 1975 (2nd Runner-up at Puteri Indonesia 1975)	Unplaced		
1976	Jakarta SCR	Treesye Ratri Astuti	Puteri Duta Indonesia 1976 (1st Runner-up at Puteri Indonesia 1976)	Unplaced		
1977	Central Java	Indri Hapsari Soeharto	Puteri Duta Indonesia 1977 (1st Runner-up at Puteri Indonesia 1977)	2nd Runner-up		

=== Miss Asia Pacific Indonesia ===
Year	Province	Miss Asia Pacific Indonesia	National title	Placement	Special awards	Notes
1970	West Java	Irma Hardisurya	Miss Indonesia 1969	Unplaced	Miss Friendship	Irma was the First Miss Indonesia ― winner in history. She competed at Miss International 1969 and also, Miss Asia Pacific 1970 by Miss Indonesia team in 1969.
1971	Jakarta SCR	Louise Maria Retno Sulistyowati	Designated	Unplaced		
1972	West Java	Ike Rachmawati Sulaeman	Ratu Indonesia 1971 (Ratu Jawa Barat)	Unplaced		Ike was appointed as Miss Asia Pacific Indonesia 1972. She was unplaced at Ratu Indonesia 1971 and she represented Jawa Barat, also Top 5 at Miss Congeniality award.
1973	Jakarta SCR	Lely Herawati Soendoro	2nd Runner-up at Miss Jakarta 1973	2nd Runner-up		Lely did not compete at Ratu Indonesia. She ended the second runner-up at Miss Jakarta. But, she was appointed as Miss Asia Pacific Indonesia 1973.
1974	Central Java	Liza Montolalu Sindoro	1st Runner-up at Ratu Indonesia 1973	3rd Runner-up		
1975	North Sulawesi	Maureen Tenges	Puteri Duta Indonesia 1975 (1st Runner-up at Puteri Indonesia 1975)	Unplaced	Miss Photogenic	
1976	West Java	Renny Rosmini Harman	Puteri Indonesia 1976 (Puteri Jawa Barat)	Unplaced		Renny unplaced at Puteri Indonesia but she won Miss Personality award. She was appointed as Miss Asia Pacific Indonesia 1976.
1977	Jakarta SCR	Linda Emran	Puteri Indonesia 1977 (Puteri Jakarta)	WINNER		Linda represented Jakarta at Puteri Indonesia 1977 but she unplaced. She was appointed as Miss Asia Pacific Indonesia 1977, and she won the title and became the 3rd Indonesia's Queen who won international pageant after Irene Rebeca and Francisca Warastuti, Queen of the Pacific in 1973 and 1975.
Did not compete between 1978—1981
1982	South Sulawesi	Andi Botenri	Miss Asia Pacific Indonesia 1982	Unplaced		In 1982, Andi was one the 5 winners at Miss Indonesia 1982. She competed at Miss World 1982, Miss Universe 1983, and finally Miss Asia Pacific 1982 under Andi Beauty Institute Jakarta (as the national holder for Indonesia) directorship.

=== Queen of the Pacific Indonesia ===
Year	Province	Queen of the Pacific Indonesia	National title	Placement	Special awards	Notes
1969	Jakarta SCR	Nany Hardjodisastro	2nd Runner-up at Miss Indonesia 1969	Unplaced	Miss Personality	
1970	North Sulawesi	Louise Maria Dominique Maengkom	1st Runner-up at Miss Indonesia 1969	Unplaced		
1971	Jakarta SCR	Louise Maria Retno Sulistyowati	Designated	Unplaced		
1972	West Java	Herni Sunarya Azwar	Ratu Indonesia 1971	Unplaced		The First Ratu Indonesia 1971 in history. She was representing Indonesia at the Queen of the Pacific 1972.
1973	Jakarta SCR	Irene Rebecca Soetanto	Ratu Indonesia 1972	WINNER		Irene is the First Indonesia's Queen who won international pageant ever.
1974	Jakarta SCR	Lydia Arlini Wahab	Ratu Indonesia 1973	Unplaced	Miss Crowning Glory	The Ratu Indonesia 1973 — winner who also represented Indonesia at Miss Asia Pacific 1974, Miss International 1974, and Miss Universe 1975.
1975	Jakarta SCR	Francisca Warastuti	Puteri Indonesia 1975	WINNER		The last Puteri Indonesia who competed at the Queen of the Pacific competition. Francisca is the Second Indonesia's Queen who won international pageant.

=== Miss Charming Indonesia ===
Year	Province	Miss Charming Indonesia	National title	Placement	Special awards	Notes
1972	Jakarta SCR	Endang Triwahjuni	1st Runner-up at Ratu Indonesia 1971	Top 15		

=== World Miss University Indonesia ===
Year	Province	World Miss University Indonesia	National title	Placement	Special awards	Notes
1988	Jakarta SCR	Linda Marie Jackson	Designated	Unplaced		

== See also ==
- List of Miss Indonesia International
- Puteri Indonesia Lingkungan
- Puteri Indonesia Pariwisata
- Puteri Indonesia Pendidikan
- Miss Indonesia
- Miss Earth Indonesia
- Miss Grand Indonesia
- Miss Mega Bintang Indonesia
- Miss Universe Indonesia
- Indonesia at the Big Four beauty pageants
