= Nadine Chandrawinata =

Indonesian actress

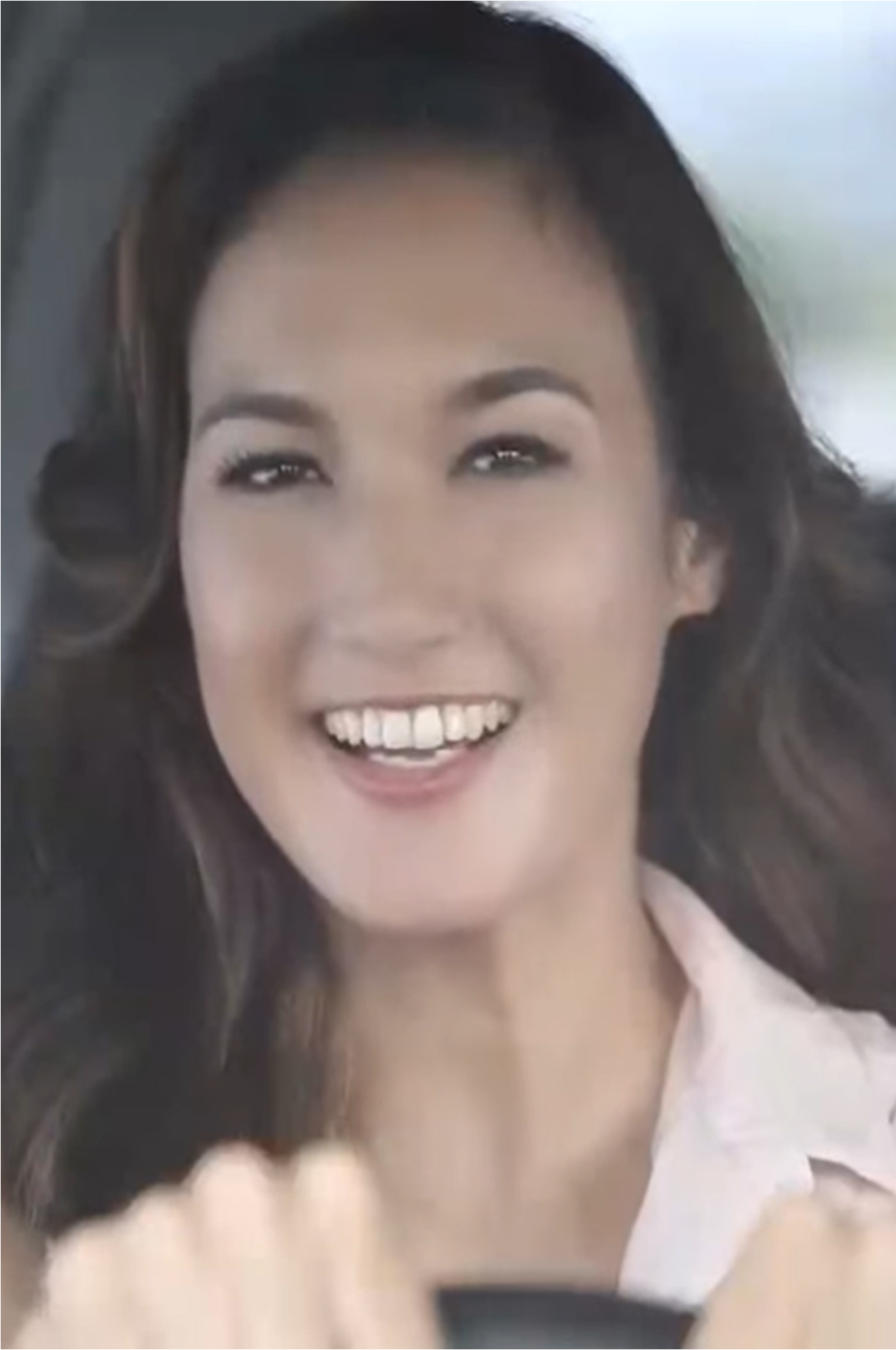
- Chandrawinata in 2016
- Born: May 8, 1984 (age 42)
- Occupations: actress; film producer
- Height: 1.75 m (5 ft 9 in)
- Spouse: Dimas Anggara (m. 2018)
- Beauty pageant titleholder
- Title: Puteri Indonesia 2005; Miss Universe Indonesia 2006
- Years active: 2006–present
- Major competitions: Puteri Indonesia 2005; (Winner); Miss Universe 2006; (Unplaced)

Nadine Chandrawinata (born 8 May 1984) is an Indonesian actress, film producer and beauty pageant titleholder who was crowned as Puteri Indonesia 2005. She represented Indonesia at Miss Universe 2006.

== Early life ==
Chandrawinata was born to Andy Chandrawinata (Chinese and Javanese) and Elfriede Fortmann (German). She has younger twin brothers, Marcel and Mischa, who are both models and actors. Chandrawinata graduated from the London School of Public Relations in Jakarta. She married actor Dimas Anggara on July 7, 2018, in Lombok. They previously married in a Buddhist ceremony on May 5, 2018, in Bhutan. The second wedding ceremony was held in Jakarta on July 15, 2018. She measures 1.75 m (5 ft 9 in) in height and 60 kilograms (130 lb) in weight.

== Career ==
Chandrawinata's film debut was in 2006, when she was cast in Upi Avianto's drama, Reality, Love, and Rock'n Roll (2006), with Herjunot Ali. She was an F1 ambassador for the 2006 Petronas Malaysian F1 Grand Prix. She is also appeared in Kiranti commercials.

Chandrawinata represented Indonesia at Miss Universe 2006.

On July 19, 2006, Chandrawinata was reported to the police by the Islamic Front Defenders (Front Pembela Islam) for her involvement in the Miss Universe 2006 beauty Pageant. She was accused of breaking the Code of Law 281, edict number 02/U/1984, regarding Cultural and Educational conduct. Indonesian law forbids any kind of involvement in beauty pageants and considers such to be indecency.

Chandrawinata has been the coral reef ambassador for the Indonesian Ministry of Marine Affairs and Fisheries, since 2008. In 2015, she started Seasoldier, to raise awareness of the country's plastic pollution in the ocean, as well as other issues such as mangrove deforestation and illegal dolphin capture. Seasoldier has established a presence in 15 locations across Indonesia, including Bali, Lombok, Medan and Bandung. As part of EU Environment Day 2021, European Union collaborates with Nadine to commemorate World Environment Day.

On July 14, 2011, Chandrawinata was promoted as Miss Mamuju for promoting the Mamuju Regency Tourism Industry. In July 2017, Chandrawinata was named as the "Tourism Advocate for New Zealand Tourism" by New Zealand Minister of Tourism to promote New Zealand eco-tourism.

== Filmography ==
As well as a television and film actor, Chandrawinata has produced an award-winning film.

=== Film ===
Year	Title	Genre	Role	Film Production	Ref.
2005	Realita, Cinta dan Rock'n Roll	romance film	as Sandra	Virgo Putra Films	
2009	Mati Suri	horror film	as Abel	Maxima Pictures	
2009	Generasi Biru	documentary film	as Nadine	Shooting Star	
2011	The Mirror Never Lies	documentary film	as a Producer together with Garin Nugroho	SET Film	
2012	Bidadari-Bidadari Surga	romance film	as Yashinta	Starvision Plus	
2013	Azrax Melawan Sindikat Perdagangan Wanita	drama film	as Fanny	Gatot Brajamusti Film	
2013	Sagarmatha	romance film	as Shila	Add Word Productions	
2014	Danau Hitam	horror film	as Keyla	Jose Poernomo	
2015	Erau Kota Raja	adventure film	as Kirana	East Cinema	
2017	Labuan Hati	romance film	as Indi	Lola Amaria Production	
2017	Negeri Dongeng	documentary film	as an Associate Producer together with Chandra Sembiring	Aksa7art	
2018	My Trip My Adventure: The Lost Paradise	adventure film	as herself	Trans Media	
2020	Nona	romance film	as Nadin	MD Entertainment	

=== TV Films ===
Year	Title	Genre	Role	TV Network	Film Production	Ref.
2013–present	My Trip My Adventure	travel show	as herself	Trans TV	Trans Media	

== Awards and nomination ==
Year	Awards	Category	Nominated work	Result	Ref.
2012	6th Edition - Asia Pacific Screen Awards	Best Youth Feature Film	The Mirror Never Lies	Won	

Awards and achievements
Preceded by Dian Paramitha	Puteri Jakarta SCR 4; 2005	Succeeded by Tiffany Hendrawan
Preceded by Bangka Belitung – Artika Sari Devi	Puteri Indonesia; 2005	Succeeded by Central Java – Agni Pratistha
