= Agni Pratistha =

Miss Universe Indonesia 2007, actress, graphic designer and model

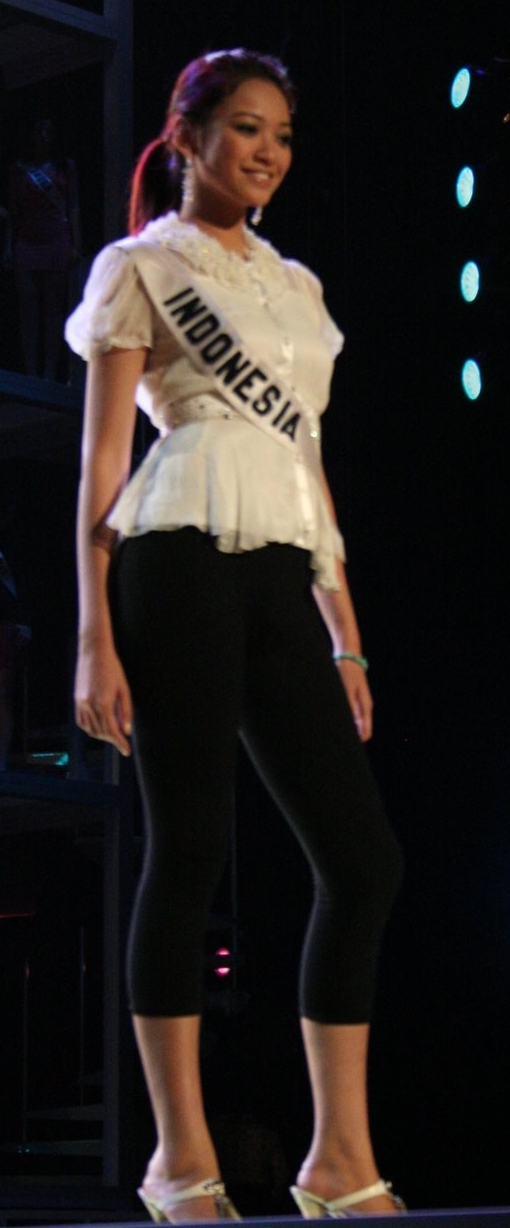
- Kuswardono in 2007
- Born: Agni Pratistha Arkadewi Kuswardono; 8 December 1987 (age 38); Canberra, Australia
- Education: Bina Nusantara University
- Height: 1.78 m (5 ft 10 in)
- Spouse: Ryan Anthony Monoarfa (m. 2013)
- Children: 3
- Beauty pageant titleholder
- Title: Puteri Indonesia 2006; Miss Universe Indonesia 2007
- Hair color: black
- Eye color: brown
- Major competitions: Puteri Indonesia 2006; (Winner); Miss Universe 2007; (Unplace)

Agni Pratistha Arkadewi Kuswardono (born 8 December 1987) is an Indonesian actress, graphic designer and beauty pageant titleholder who was the winner of Puteri Indonesia 2006 (Miss Universe Indonesia). She represented Indonesia in the Miss Universe 2007 pageant held in Mexico City, Mexico in May 2007, where she won the Best National Costume award.

== Personal life ==
Kuswardono was born in Canberra, Australia to Javanese parents. Indonesian model and actress Sigi Wimala is her sister. In 2004, she settled at Jakarta, Indonesia. Her full name "Agni Pratistha" means "invocation of the God of Fire" and was inspired by the Hindu rituals, the name "Agni" means "God of Fire" in Sanskrit whereas "Pratistha" means "invocation". She holds a bachelor degree in graphic design from the Bina Nusantara University in Jakarta, Indonesia, after graduated she worked at CosmoGirl Indonesia as an Executive Editor from 2007 to 2012.

On 17 June 2013, Kuswardono married Ryan Anthony Monoarfa in Las Vegas, United States. The wedding reception was held on 14 December 2013 in Jakarta, Indonesia. They have three children. Kuswardono and her husband founded Chubby Max Cookies and Ark Motion Images.

== Pageantry ==
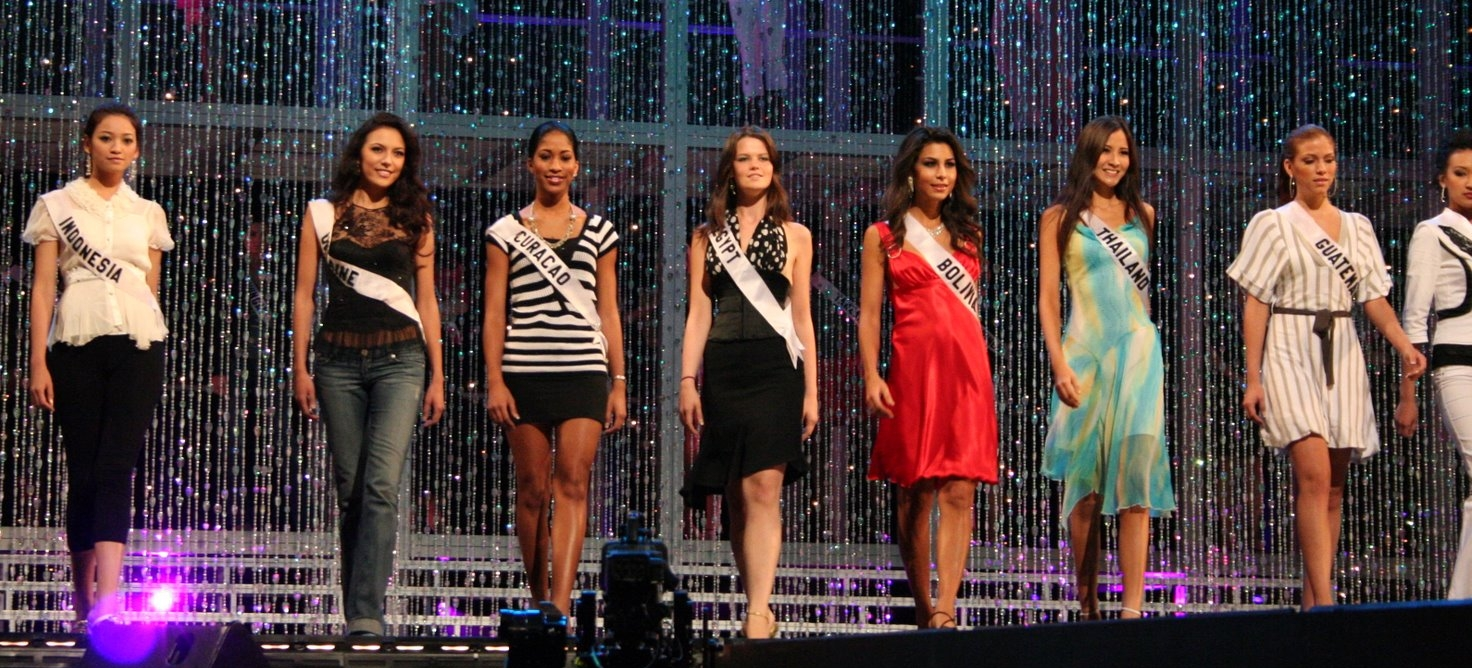
Kuswardono (left) during Miss Universe 2007 rehearsal at Auditorio Nacional, Mexico City.

=== Puteri Indonesia 2006 ===
Representing her province Central Java, Kuswardono was crowned Puteri Indonesia 2006 at the finals held at the Taman Mini Indonesia Indah, Jakarta, on 25 August 2006 by the outgoing titleholder of Puteri Indonesia 2005, Nadine Chandrawinata of Jakarta SCR. She was crowned together with Rahma Landy Sjahruddin from Jakarta SCR who won the title of Puteri Indonesia Lingkungan at the end of the event.

=== Miss Universe 2007 ===
As Indonesia's representative in the Miss Universe 2007 pageant, Kuswardono travelled to Mexico City, Mexico in end of April to participate in the four weeks of quarantine events, rehearsals and preliminary competitions with the other seventy-seven delegates.

At the final, Kuswardono's Dayak inspired costume ended won Best National Costume award for the first time for Indonesia.

== Filmography ==
As an actress, Kuswardono appeared on several films. Kuswardono started her foray into acting in 2004, starred on Mengejar Matahari (Chasing the Sun), which was shown in the 2005 International Film Festival Rotterdam. In 2018, Agni starred in leading role in all three omnibus episodes of Asian Three-Fold Mirror 2018: The Journey (The Sea, Hekishu, and Variable No.3), directed by Japan's Daichi Matsunaga, Indonesia's Edwin and China's Degena Yun. The film was co-produced by Tokyo International Film Festival and Japan Foundation Asian Center, a part of biannual Asian Three-Fold Mirror Project. It had its world premiere at the 31st Tokyo International Film Festival on October 26, 2018.

=== Movies ===
Year	Title	Genre	Role	Film Production	Ref.
2004	Mengejar Matahari	drama	as Rara	SinemArt	
2012	Cinta Tapi Beda	romance	as Diana	Multi Vision Plus	
2012	Jakarta Hati	romance	as Isabella	13 Entertainment	
2013	9 Summers 10 Autumns	romance	as Isa	Angka Fortuna Sinema	
2016	Pinky Promise	drama	as Kartika Rahayu	Manoj Punjabi	
2018	Message Man	action	as Jenti	Corey Pearson	
2018	Asian Three-Fold Mirror 2018: The Journey: Part 1: The Sea; Part 2: Hekishu; Part 3: Variable No.3	action	as Agnia	Tokyo International Film Festival; Japan Foundation Asian Center; Degena Yun (China); Daichi Matsunaga (Japan); Edwin (Indonesia)	
2023	Hubungi Agen Gue!	comedy	as Nia Lubis	Disney+ Hotstar	

== Awards and nomination ==
Kuswardono received the Model Star Award for her contribution to Indonesian modelling and acting at the 2012 Asia Model Festival Awards in Seoul, South Korea.

Year	Awards	Category	Nominated work	Result	Ref.
2012	Asia Model Festival Awards	Model Star Award	Herself	Won	

== See also ==
- Puteri Indonesia
- Miss Universe
- Miss Universe 2007
- Rahma Landy Sjahruddin

Awards and achievements
Preceded by Anggina Maharani	Puteri Central Java; 2006	Succeeded by Elvaretta Nathania Gunawan
Preceded by Jakarta SCR 4 – Nadine Chandrawinata	Puteri Indonesia; 2006	Succeeded by East Java – Putri Raemawasti
