= Melanie Putria Dewita Sari =

Indonesian beauty queen, television host and actress

- Born: Melanie Putria Dewita Sari; April 17, 1982 (age 44); Jakarta, Indonesia
- Height: 1.70 m (5 ft 7 in)
- Spouses: Angga Puradiredja (m. 2010; div. 2019); Aldico Sapardan (m. 2022)
- Children: Sheemar Rahman Puradiredja
- Beauty pageant titleholder
- Title: Puteri Indonesia 2002
- Major competitions: Puteri Indonesia Sumatera Barat 2002 (Winner); Puteri Indonesia 2002 (Winner); Miss Universe 2002 (As an observer, did not compete)

Melanie Putria Dewita Sari (born 17 April 1982 in Jakarta) is an Indonesian beauty queen, television host and actress. She is known for winning the Puteri Indonesia title in 2002, as the representative of West Sumatra.

== Biography ==
Melanie was born in Jakarta to Habibuddin and Nelwetis. She attended the London School of Public Relation in Jakarta.

== Puteri Indonesia 2002 ==
After she was crowned as Puteri Indonesia 2002, she had many social activities. She also accompanied the Miss Universe 2002, Oxana Fedorova, visiting Borobudur. They also met the President of Indonesia, Megawati Soekarnoputri, at her residence, Istana Negara.

== Personal life ==
She married Angga Puradiredja, a member of the Indonesian jazz band Maliq & D'Essentials, in Jakarta on 7 March 2010. They held the wedding reception at Manggala Wana Bhakti and her brother, Andre Habibuddin, acted as her guardian.

She gave birth to a son, Sheemar Rahman Puradiredja, on 27 January 2011.

On November 23, 2018, she filed for divorce from her husband, citing irreconcilable differences. Their divorce was finalized on January 22, 2019.

Awards and achievements
| Preceded by Melati Zulkarnaen | Puteri West Sumatra; 2002 | Succeeded by Yoke Paramitha Djati |
| Preceded by North Sulawesi – Angelina Sondakh | Puteri Indonesia; 2002 | Succeeded by Jakarta SCR 2 – Dian Khrisna |
