= Rahma Landy Sjahruddin =

Indonesian actress, presenter, dentist and Miss International Indonesia 2007

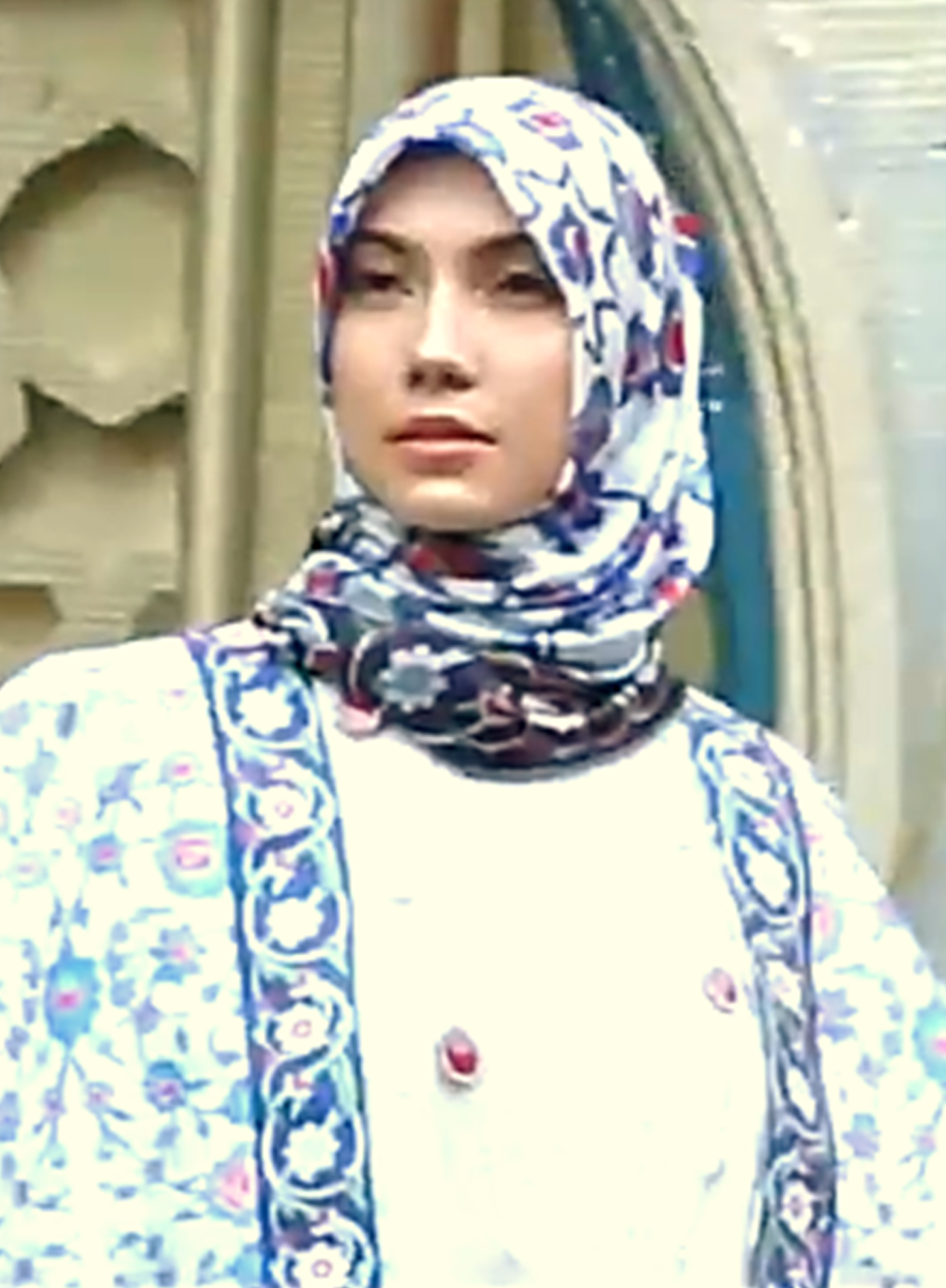
- Miss International Indonesia 2007
- Born: October 19, 1982 (age 43); Jakarta, Indonesia
- Education: Trisakti University
- Occupations: actress; TV presenter; dentist; fashion model; Beauty pageant titleholders
- Height: 176 cm (5 ft 9 in)
- Beauty pageant titleholder
- Title: Puteri Indonesia Pariwisata 2006; Miss International Indonesia 2007
- Hair color: Black
- Eye color: Brown
- Major competitions: Puteri Indonesia 2006; (2nd Runner-up – Puteri Indonesia Pariwisata 2006); Miss International 2007; (Top 15)

Rahma Landy Sjahruddin (born October 19, 1982) popularly known as Rahma Landy is an Indonesian-Irish actress, TV presenter, dentist, fashion model and beauty pageant titleholder who won the title of Puteri Indonesia Pariwisata 2006. She represented Indonesia at the Miss International 2007 pageant in Japan, placing among the Top 15 semi-finalists, and becoming the third Indonesian to be called as Miss International Finalists after Treesye Ratri Nugraheni Astuti who placed for the first time in Miss International 1976 and Indri Hapsari Suharto who won 2nd Runner-up in Miss International 1977.

== Early life and education ==
Rahma was born in Jakarta – Indonesia to a Javanese-Irish parents, who has been living in Australia and Lebanon. In 2005, before joining Puteri Indonesia, she won Wajah Femina, hold by Femina (Indonesia) magazine. She holds a master degree in Doctor of Dentistry (DDent) from Trisakti University, Jakarta, Indonesia. Now she is currently work as a dentist.

== Pageantry ==
=== Puteri Jakarta SCR 2006 ===
In 2006, Rahma competed in the regional pageant of Puteri Jakarta SCR 2006, and won the title to represent her province Jakarta in Puteri Indonesia 2006. She was crowned by the outgoing titleholder Rahma Alia.

=== Puteri Indonesia 2006 ===
Rahma was crowned as Puteri Indonesia Pariwisata 2006 at the grand finale held in Jakarta Convention Center, Jakarta, Indonesia on March 9, by the outgoing titleholder of Puteri Indonesia 2nd Runner-up 2005, Valerina Novita Daniel of Jakarta SCR 6. Rahma represented the Jakarta SCR 5 province at the pageant.

=== Miss International 2007 ===
As Puteri Indonesia Pariwisata 2006, Rahma represented Indonesia at the 47th edition of Miss International 2007 pageant in held in Tokyo Dome City Hall, Bunkyo, Tokyo, Japan. The finale was held on October 15, 2007, where Rahma placed as one of the Top 15 finalists, she wore the dress designed by Ivan Gunawan. Daniela di Giacomo of Venezuela crowned her successor Priscila Perales of Mexico by the end of the event.

== Filmography ==
Rahma has appeared in several film and television films in Indonesia.

=== Movies ===
Year	Title	Genre	Role	Film Production	Ref.
2016	Hantu Rumah Ampera	horror movies	as Annisa	Rapi Films	

=== Television films ===
Year	Title	Role	Network	Ref.
2015	Masalembo	as Rahma (Naro mother)	NET. TV	
2016-2018	Kesempurnaan Cinta	as Rahma	NET. TV	

== See also ==
- Puteri Indonesia
- Miss International
- Miss International 2007
- Agni Pratistha Arkadewi Kuswardono

Awards and achievements
Preceded by Rahma Alia	Puteri Jakarta SCR 5; 2006	Succeeded by Putri Widyasri
Preceded by Jakarta – Valerina Daniel	Puteri Indonesia Pariwisata; 2006	Succeeded by Jakarta – Ika Fiyonda Putri
Preceded by Central Java – Indri Hapsari Soeharto	Miss International Indonesia; 2007	Succeeded by North Sumatra – Duma Riris Silalahi
