= Indri Hapsari Soeharto =

Indonesian actress

- Born: Indri Hapsari Soeharto; 20 November 1960 (age 65); Jakarta, Indonesia
- Education: Sheffield University; University of Indonesia
- Occupation: Actress
- Years active: 1977-present
- Title: Putri Indonesia 1977 (Winner); Miss International 1977 (2nd Runner-up)

Indri Hapsari Soeharto (/suːˈhɑːrtoʊ/ soo-HAR-toh, Indonesian: [suˈharto]; Javanese: ꦯꦸꦲꦂꦠ) is an Indonesian actress, and beauty pageant titleholder who won Putri Indonesia 1997 (Miss International Indonesia 1977). She represented Indonesia at Miss International 1977 in Japan, where she was second runner-up. Soeharto was the first Indonesian to be a Miss International finalist at a major pageant.

== Early life and education ==
Born in Jakarta, Indonesia, Soeharto holds a master's degree in Clinical Child Psychology and Psychiatry from the University of Indonesia, Jakarta, her dissertation was about children with autism. She also earned her Doctorate in Philosophy (Ph.D.) from the Department of Human Communication Sciences, Health Sciences School, University of Sheffield, England, where Soeharto received a full scholarship from Indonesia Endowment Fund for Education.

After she graduated, Soeharto worked as a Special Protection project officer for international non-governmental organization (NGO) named "Plan". Soeharto worked with survivors of the 2006 Yogyakarta earthquake, those impacted by 2004 Indian Ocean earthquake and tsunami and those affected by the Insurgency in Aceh.

== Pageantry ==
=== Putri Indonesia 1977 ===
In 1977, Soeharto participated in and won Putri Indonesia 1977 at Taman Mini Indonesia Indah in Jakarta. She was crowned by her predecessor and Miss International Indonesia 1976, Treesye Ratri Astuti of Central Java, was the last Indonesian representative to enter a Miss International beauty pageant before the organisation became inactive from 1978 to 2007.

=== Miss International 1977 ===
Soeharto represented Indonesia at Miss International 1977 on 1 July 1977, at the Imperial Garden Theater in Tokyo, Japan. and was second runner-up.

== Filmography ==
Soeharto appeared in the film, Bulu-Bulu Cendrawasih, directed by Umar Kayam. This film is about an immigrant child who is looking for his fortune to become a model. Since then, Soeharto has appeared in other films and television films in Indonesia.

=== Movies ===
| Year | Title | Genre | Role | Film Production | Ref. |
|---|---|---|---|---|---|
| 1978 | Bulu-Bulu Cendrawasih | romance film | as Indri | Umar Kayam | |
| 1979 | Kabut Sutra Ungu | romance film | as Naomi | Sjumandjaja | |

Awards and achievements
| Preceded by India – Nafisa Ali | Miss International 2nd Runner-up; 1977 | Succeeded by Belgium – Brigitte Maria Muyshondt |
| Preceded by Central Java – Tresyee Ratri Nugraheni Astuti | Miss International Indonesia; 1977 | Succeeded by Jakarta SCR – Rahma Landy Sjahruddin |
