= Puteri Indonesia 2025 =

2025 Indonesian beauty pageant

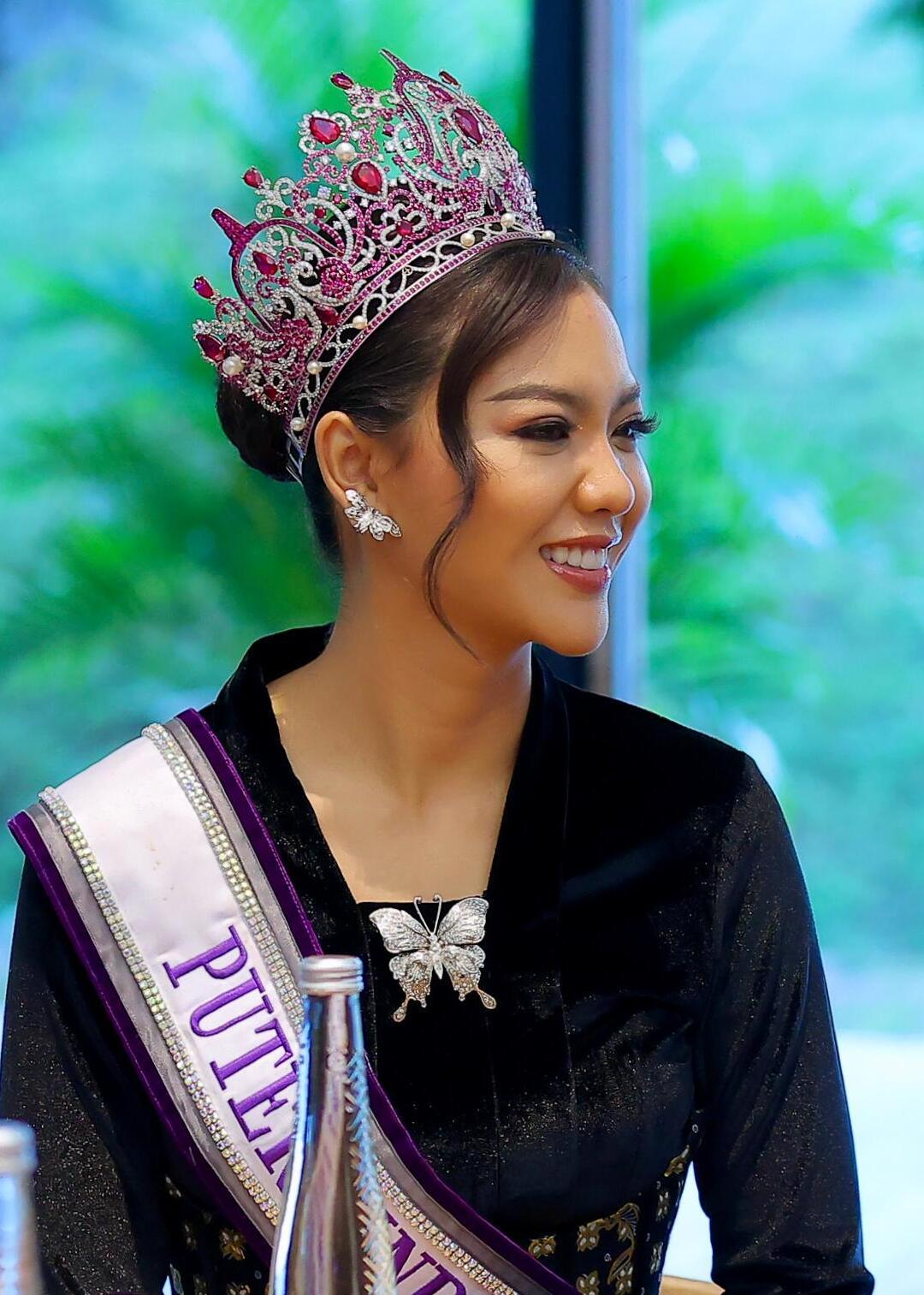
- Firsta Yufi Amarta Putri, Puteri Indonesia 2025
- Date: 2 May 2025
- Presenters: Choky Sitohang; Patricia Gouw
- Entertainment: Ari Lasso; Ziva Magnolya; Baim
- Theme: Be Right, Be Bright
- Venue: Plenary Hall, Jakarta International Convention Center, Jakarta, Indonesia
- Broadcaster: SCTV; Vidio
- Entrants: 45
- Placements: 16
- Debuts: South Papua
- Withdrawals: West Papua
- Returns: North Kalimantan; North Maluku
- Winner: Firsta Yufi Amarta Putri; East Java

External videos
- Puteri Indonesia 2025: The Coronation
- Puteri Indonesia 2025: Preliminary Competition
- Puteri Indonesia 2025: Talent and Traditional Costume Show

Puteri Indonesia 2025, the 28th edition of the Puteri Indonesia pageant, was held on 2 May 2025 at the Plenary Hall, Jakarta International Convention Center in Jakarta, Indonesia. Harashta Haifa Zahra of West Java crowned her successor, Firsta Yufi Amarta Putri of East Java, at the end of the event. This marks the fourth time East Java has won Puteri Indonesia, following victories in 2007, 2014, and 2020. Firsta represented Indonesia at Miss Supranational 2025 in Poland, placing in the Top 24.

Puteri Indonesia Lingkungan 2024, Sophie Kirana of SR Yogyakarta; Puteri Indonesia Pariwisata 2024, Ketut Permata Juliastrid Sari of Bali; and Puteri Indonesia Pendidikan dan Kebudayaan 2024, Melati Tedja of East Java, also crowned their successors: Melliza Xaviera Putri Yulian of Jakarta SCR 1, Salma Ranggita Cahyariyani of South Sumatra 1, and Rinanda Aprillya Maharani of East Kalimantan respectively.

For the first time ever, the finale was attended by international beauty pageant titleholders from Southeast Asia, including Miss Supranational 2024, Harashta Haifa Zahra, and Miss Cosmo 2024, Ketut Permata Juliastrid Sari, both from Indonesia, alongside Miss International 2024, Huỳnh Thị Thanh Thủy of Vietnam, and Miss Charm 2024, Rashmita Rasindran of Malaysia.

== Pageant ==
=== Preliminary round ===
Before the final telecast, the delegates participated in the preliminary competition, which featured presentations in traditional costumes, talent showcases, and evening gown segments. Held on 26 April 2025, at Balai Sarbini in Jakarta, the event was streamed live on the Puteri Indonesia YouTube channel. Olivia Tan and Bayu Adhitama hosted the event, which included special performances by Rossa, Dipha Barus, and Barsena Bestandhi.

==== Selection committee ====
- Putri Kus Wisnu Wardani – chairwoman of the advisory board of Yayasan Puteri Indonesia
- Kusuma Dewi Sutanto – head of organization of Yayasan Puteri Indonesia
- Mega Angkasa – head of communications of Yayasan Puteri Indonesia
- Kusuma Ida Anjani – director of Mustika Ratu, chairwoman of the Puteri Indonesia 2025 selection
- Sabrina Chairunnisa – Puteri Indonesia 2011 3rd Runner-up from North Sumatra, actress, and content creator
- Yasinta Aurellia – Puteri Indonesia Lingkungan 2023 from East Java and Top 24 at Miss Supranational 2023
- Ayu Heni Rosan – Puteri Indonesia Bali 1992 and founder of Yayasan Citra Kartini Indonesia
- Rizki Handayani Mustafa – deputy Minister of Tourism
- Hetifah Sjaifudian – chairwoman of Commission X of the House of Representatives

=== Finals ===
This year's competition maintained the same number of semifinalists as the previous edition, with 16 spots available. The preliminary competition, held on 26 April 2025, along with various quarantine activities—including talent, traditional costume, and evening gown showcases, as well as private interviews with the judges and psychological assessment—determined the top 13 semifinalists. Public voting was also incorporated to select the 14th to 16th contestants advancing to the final round.

==== Selection committee ====
- Kusuma Dewi Sutanto – head of organization of Yayasan Puteri Indonesia
- Mega Angkasa – head of communications of Yayasan Puteri Indonesia
- Kusuma Ida Anjani – director of Mustika Ratu, chairwoman of the Puteri Indonesia 2025 selection
- Farhana Nariswari – Puteri Indonesia 2023 from West Java
- Sultan Bachtiar Najamudin – speaker of the Regional Representative Council
- Rosan Roeslani – Minister of Investment and Downstream Industry
- Titiek Suharto – member of the House of Representatives
- Widiyanti Putri – Minister of Tourism
- Jahja Setiaatmadja – president director of Bank Central Asia
- Ayu Dewi – actress, model, presenter and comedian

== Background ==
=== Location and date ===
Puteri Indonesia 2025 coronation night was held on 2 May 2025 at the Plenary Hall, Jakarta Convention Center in Jakarta, coinciding with National Education Day. The pre-quarantine period took place from 15 to 23 April 2025, followed by the main quarantine from 24 April to 2 May 2025.

=== Host and performers ===
Choky Sitohang and Patricia Gouw returned as hosts for Puteri Indonesia 2025, marking Sitohang's 14th time and Gouw's fifth time hosting the pageant. The duo previously hosted together for Puteri Indonesia 2020 and from 2022 to 2024. Ari Lasso and Ziva Magnolya performed at the event this year.

=== Selection of participants ===
Candidates for Puteri Indonesia 2025 were selected through auditions held in Jakarta, regional competitions, or public voting. Registration closed on 31 January 2025, with auditions taking place throughout February 2025.

Six provinces—Bangka Belitung, Banten, East Java, South Sulawesi, West Java, and West Nusa Tenggara—hosted regional competition to choose their representatives. Among the four new provinces in Eastern Indonesia, only South Papua made its debut this year. Meanwhile, West Papua withdrew from the competition due to the absence of a selected delegate.

== Competitions ==
=== Best Photogenic ===
The Best Photogenic award was chosen by Bubah Alfian, Creative Director of Puteri Indonesia, based on a photoshoot session held on 18 April 2025. The selection criteria included not only physical appearance, but also the contestants' aura and charisma. In addition, Bubah also awarded the contestant with the most unique face.

Result	Contestants
Winners	Central Java 1 – Maura Izzati; Central Sulawesi – Jeaneth Anabella Josevina; Jakarta SCR 1 – Melliza Xaviera Putri Yulian
Unique Face	Southeast Sulawesi – Lidyana Nono

=== Catwalk Challenge ===
In this challenge, contestants will showcase their catwalk skills through short videos, featuring outfits that highlight traditional Indonesian fabrics as part of the 'Wastra Bersabda' theme for the 28th edition. The Top 20 contestants will then become opening dance centers for the preliminary competition.

Result	Contestants
Winners	Bali – Ni Nyoman Ayu Natasya Amanda; Jakarta SCR 1 – Melliza Xaviera Putri Yulian; North Sumatra 1 – Putri Agita Sembiring Milala
Top 20	Aceh – Mutiara Hasanah; Bangka Belitung – Mery Wiega Andreani; Banten – Syafira Mardhiyah; Central Sulawesi – Jeaneth Anabella Josevina; East Java – Firsta Yufi Amarta Putri; East Kalimantan – Rinanda Aprillya Maharani; East Nusa Tenggara – Elisea Benedicta Katharina Mada; Jakarta SCR 3 – Sarah Sentoso; Jakarta SCR 6 – Lailani Fitrah Ramadhani; Lampung – Intan Kartika Putri Astari; Papua – Yokbet Merauje; Riau Islands 1 – Yetti Mawar Sembiring Meliala; Southeast Sulawesi – Lidyana Nono; South Kalimantan 1 – Nur Azelia Humani Santang; South Kalimantan 2 – Antung Aulia Salsa Bella; Yogyakarta SR – Maharani Divaningtyas; West Nusa Tenggara – Cahaya Sukma Dewi

=== Best Makeup ===
In this challenge, contestants showcase their makeup skills using Mustika Ratu cosmetic products in short videos, with the best makeup design winning the challenge.

Result	Contestants
Winners	East Kalimantan – Rinanda Aprillya Maharani; Jakarta SCR 3 – Sarah Sentoso; South Kalimantan 1 – Nur Azelia Humani Santang

=== Best Profile Video ===
Contestants are required to create a profile video introducing themselves and the province they represent, with the best video winning this award.

Result	Contestants
Winners	East Java – Firsta Yufi Amarta Putri; East Kalimantan – Rinanda Aprillya Maharani; North Sulawesi – Cindi Noladyta Takumansang

=== Best Talent ===
Contestants showcased their talents on stage, with those demonstrating exceptional skills being awarded for their performances.

Result	Contestants
Winner	East Kalimantan – Rinanda Aprillya Maharani
Top 3	Bangka Belitung – Mery Wiega Andreani; North Sumatra 2 – Morana Angelica Pertiwi Rajagukguk
Top 12	Banten – Syafira Mardhiyah; Central Java 1 – Maura Izzati; East Java – Firsta Yufi Amarta Putri; Jakarta SCR 3 – Sarah Sentoso; North Kalimantan – Dewi Ratna Ningsih; Riau Islands 1 – Yetti Mawar Sembiring Meliala; South Papua – Theresia Shamenta Novianty Kowirop Kaipman; South Sulawesi – Andi Adriana Noviyanti Andi Rumpang; West Nusa Tenggara – Cahaya Sukma Dewi

=== Best in Traditional Costume ===
During the Traditional Costume Show, contestants showcased their traditional attire in front of the judges. The top three nominees for Best in Traditional Costume were announced at the event's conclusion, with the grand winner to be revealed on coronation night.

Result	Contestants
Winner	South Kalimantan 2 – Antung Aulia Salsa Bella
Top 3	East Java – Firsta Yufi Amarta Putri; Lampung – Intan Kartika Putri Astari

=== Best in Evening Gown ===
During the Preliminary Competition, contestants showcased their evening gowns in front of the judges, and the top three nominees along with the Best in Evening Gown winner were announced at the event's conclusion.

Result	Contestants
Winner	East Kalimantan – Rinanda Aprillya Maharani
1st Runner-up	West Nusa Tenggara – Cahaya Sukma Dewi
2nd Runner-up	Jakarta SCR 1 – Melliza Xaviera Putri Yulian

=== Motion Challenge ===
The contestants were randomly divided into seven groups for this challenge. Each contestant was tasked with presenting their chosen mission or advocacy on stage, followed by a discussion where the hosts posed questions and motions on various cases and issues. The contestants then shared their thoughts and ideas, showcasing their perspectives on each topic.

Result	Contestants
Winner	Riau – Sarah Aurelia Saragih
1st Runner-up	Jakarta SCR 3 – Sarah Sentoso
2nd Runner-up	South Sumatra 1 – Salma Ranggita Cahyariyani
Top 9	East Kalimantan – Rinanda Aprillya Maharani; Jakarta SCR 4 – Joanne Amanda Irawan; Papua – Yokbet Merauje; South Kalimantan 1 – Nur Azelia Humani Santang; South Papua – Theresia Shamenta Novianty Kowirop Kaipman; Yogyakarta SR – Maharani Divaningtyas

== Results ==
=== Titleholders ===
Puteri Indonesia 2025
Puteri Indonesia Lingkungan 2025
Puteri Indonesia Pariwisata 2025
Puteri Indonesia Pendidikan 2025
Puteri Indonesia Kebudayaan 2025
Puteri Indonesia Inovasi & Teknologi 2025

Placement	Contestant	International Placement
Puteri Indonesia 2025 (Miss Supranational Indonesia 2025)	East Java – Firsta Yufi Amarta Putri	Top 24 – Miss Supranational 2025
Puteri Indonesia Lingkungan 2025 (Miss International Indonesia 2025)	Jakarta SCR 1 – Melliza Xaviera Putri Yulian	3rd Runner-Up – Miss International 2025
Puteri Indonesia Pariwisata 2025 (Miss Cosmo Indonesia 2025)	South Sumatra 1 – Salma Ranggita Cahyariyani	Top 21 – Miss Cosmo 2025
Puteri Indonesia Pendidikan 2025 (Miss Charm Indonesia 2025)	East Kalimantan – Rinanda Aprillya Maharani	2nd Runner-Up – Miss Charm 2025
Puteri Indonesia Kebudayaan 2025	Banten – Syafira Mardhiyah	Did not compete
Puteri Indonesia Inovasi & Teknologi 2025	Yogyakarta SR – Maharani Divaningtyas § Δ	Did not compete
Top 16	Jakarta SCR 2 – La-Tanya Alisa Riskasari; Jakarta SCR 3 – Sarah Sentoso; North Sulawesi – Cindi Noladyta Takumansang; North Sumatra 1 – Putri Agita Sembiring Milala §; Riau – Sarah Aurelia Saragih; Riau Islands 1 – Yetti Mawar Sembiring Meliala; South Kalimantan 1 – Nur Azelia Humani Santang §; South Sulawesi – Andi Adriana Noviyanti Rumpang; West Nusa Tenggara – Cahaya Sukma Dewi; West Sulawesi – Adinda Putri Pawan	Did not compete

Δ – Advanced to the Top 6 via public voting
§ – Advanced to the Top 16 via public voting

=== Special awards ===
Awards	Contestants
Main Awards
Puteri Indonesia Persahabatan (Miss Congeniality)	North Sumatra 1 – Putri Agita Sembiring Milala
Puteri Indonesia Favorit (Miss Favorite)	Yogyakarta SR – Maharani Divaningtyas
Kostum Tradisional Terbaik (Best in Traditional Costume)	South Kalimantan 2 – Antung Aulia Salsa Bella
Gaun Malam Terbaik (Best in Evening Gown)	(gold) East Kalimantan – Rinanda Aprillya Maharani; (silver) West Nusa Tenggara – Cahaya Sukma Dewi; (bronze) Jakarta SCR 1 – Melliza Xaviera Putri Yulian
Puteri Indonesia Berbakat (Miss Talent)	East Kalimantan – Rinanda Aprillya Maharani
Puteri Indonesia Intelegensia (Miss Intelligence)	(gold) East Kalimantan – Rinanda Aprillya Maharani; (silver) South Papua – Theresia Shamenta Novianty Kowirop Kaipman; (bronze) Jambi – Nadia Aprisilia
Puteri Indonesia Berpengaruh (Miss Influencer)	South Kalimantan 1 – Nur Azelia Humani Santang

== Contestants ==
45 contestants competed in this year's competition.

Province	Contestant	Age (Note: Ages at the time of the pageant.)	Hometown
Sumatra
Aceh	Mutiara Hasanah	25	Banda Aceh
North Sumatra 1	Putri Agita Sembiring Milala	27	Karo
North Sumatra 2	Morana Angelica Pertiwi Rajagukguk	25	Pematangsiantar
West Sumatra	Febri Sinta Gracya	24	Pesisir Selatan
Riau	Sarah Aurelia Saragih	26	Pekanbaru
Riau Islands 1	Yetti Mawar Sembiring Meliala	27	Batam
Riau Islands 2	Fidya Adystiara	25	Batam
Jambi	Nadia Aprisilia	22	Muaro Jambi
South Sumatra 1	Salma Ranggita Cahyariyani	22	Palembang
South Sumatra 2	Badia Inaya Sazrade	25	Palembang
Bangka Belitung	Mery Wiega Andreani	23	Bangka
Bengkulu	Tasya Putri Amanda Rantou	23	Rejang Lebong
Lampung	Intan Kartika Putri Astari	21	Tulang Bawang
Java
Jakarta SCR 1	Melliza Xaviera Putri Yulian	25	Jakarta
Jakarta SCR 2	La-Tanya Alisa Riskasari	24	Jakarta
Jakarta SCR 3	Sarah Sentoso	26	Jakarta
Jakarta SCR 4	Joanne Amanda Irawan	24	Jakarta
Jakarta SCR 5	Shania Sisilia Sapphira Hutapea	25	Jakarta
Jakarta SCR 6	Lailani Fitrah Ramadhani	27	Jakarta
Jakarta SCR 7	Adinda Dhia Dimitri	27	Jakarta
Banten	Syafira Mardhiyah	23	South Tangerang
West Java	Ratu Ayu Salsabila	24	Bandung
Central Java 1	Maura Izzati	22	Banyumas
Central Java 2	Syaloomitha Meirika Maranatha	22	Semarang
Yogyakarta SR	Maharani Divaningtyas	24	Sleman
East Java	Firsta Yufi Amarta Putri	23	Banyuwangi
Lesser Sunda Islands
Bali	Ni Nyoman Ayu Natasya Amanda	23	Badung
West Nusa Tenggara	Cahaya Sukma Dewi	21	Mataram
East Nusa Tenggara	Elisea Benedicta Katharina Mada	25	South Central Timor
Kalimantan
West Kalimantan	Ridha Annisakinah	22	Pontianak
Central Kalimantan	Ahsan Nadia Ramadhana	23	North Barito
South Kalimantan 1	Nur Azelia Humani Santang	27	Banjarmasin
South Kalimantan 2	Antung Aulia Salsa Bella	23	Tanah Bumbu
East Kalimantan	Rinanda Aprillya Maharani	22	East Kutai
North Kalimantan	Dewi Ratna Ningsih	21	Tarakan
Sulawesi
South Sulawesi	Andi Adriana Noviyanti Rumpang	26	Wajo
West Sulawesi	Adinda Putri Pawan	25	Central Mamuju
Southeast Sulawesi	Lidyana Nono	20	Kendari
Central Sulawesi	Jeaneth Anabella Josevina	21	Sigi
North Sulawesi	Cindi Noladyta Takumansang	24	Sangihe Islands
Gorontalo	Zenab Fadila Ahaya	19	Gorontalo
Eastern Indonesia
Maluku	Sharon Chelnique Enia Sahetapy	25	Central Maluku
North Maluku	Nurul Safitri	22	Ternate
South Papua	Theresia Shamenta Novianty Kowirop Kaipman	21	Merauke
Papua	Yokbet Merauje	24	Jayapura
