= Puteri Indonesia Pendidikan =

Title granted by Puteri Indonesia beauty pageant

- Logo of the Puteri Indonesia org.
- Formation: 2016; 10 years ago
- Type: Beauty pageant
- Headquarters: Jakarta
- Location: Indonesia
- Official language: Indonesian and English
- President and CEO: The Royal Highest Princess Mooryati Soedibyo of Surakarta Sunanate
- Chairperson: The Royal Highest Princess Putri Kus Wisnu Wardani of Surakarta Sunanate
- Parent organization: Puteri Indonesia Charities, Inc.
- Affiliations: The Royal Highest Family of Surakarta Sunanate; Mustika Ratu
- Budget: US$100 million (annually)
- Website: www.puteri-indonesia.com

Puteri Indonesia Pendidikan (previously known as Puteri Indonesia Pendidikan & Kebudayaan; literally translates into: "Educational Princess of Indonesia") is one of the titles granted by the Puteri Indonesia beauty pageant. This title was previously called Puteri Indonesia Perdamaian which was used from 2016 to 2018. The titleholders of Puteri Indonesia Pendidikan represent Indonesia in the international beauty pageants. Puteri Indonesia Pendidikan is traditionally crowned in March, alongside the celebration of International Women's Day.

The reigning Puteri Indonesia Pendidikan is Gisela Belicia Alma Thesalonica Silalahi of DKI Jakarta 2, who was crowned on April 24, 2026 in Jakarta Convention Center.

== Gallery of winners ==
The winners of Puteri Indonesia Pendidikan

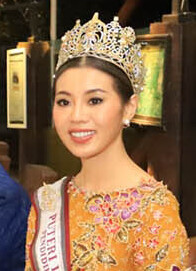
Puteri Indonesia Pendidikan & Kebudayaan 2024
Melati Tedja

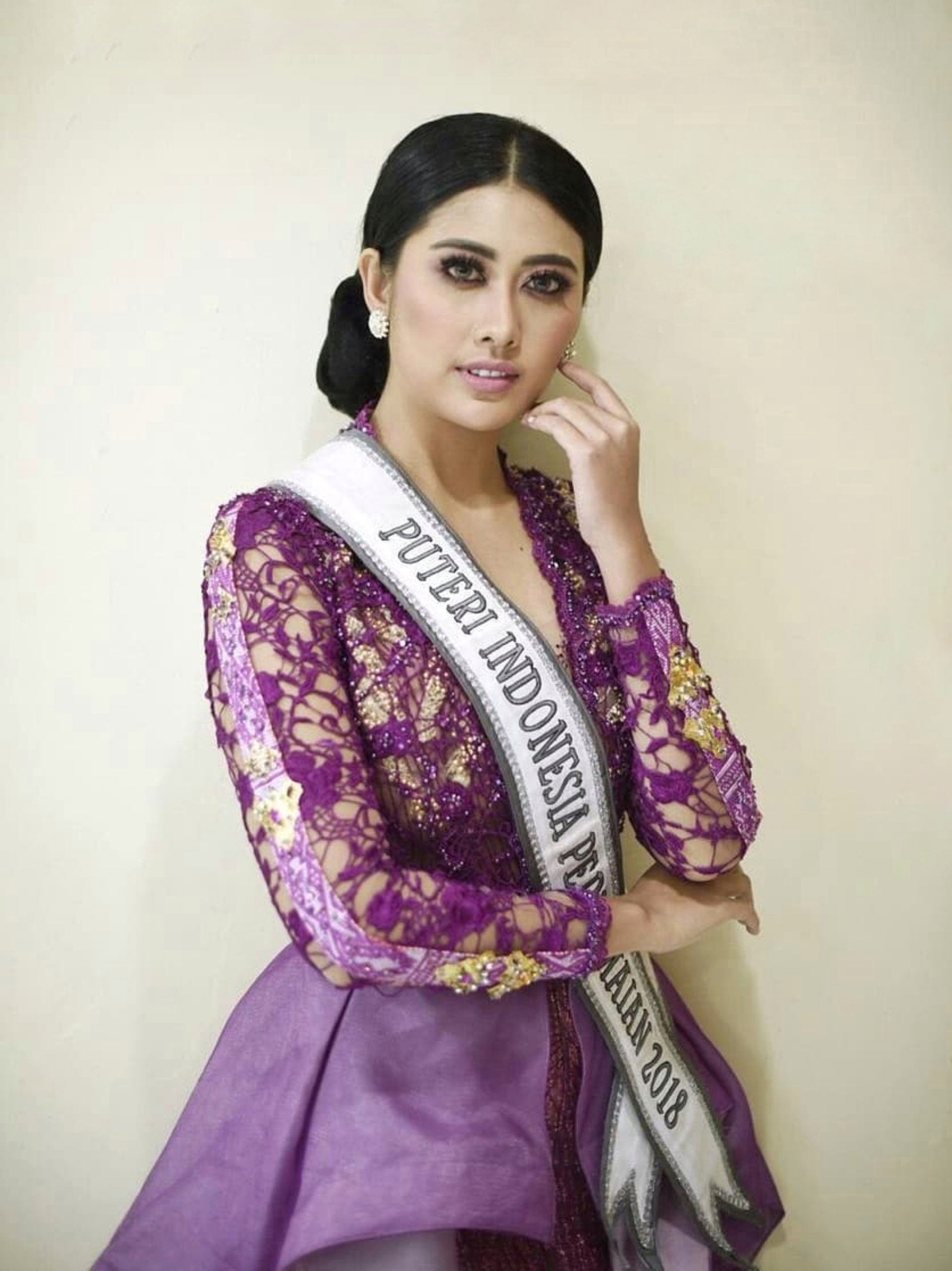
Puteri Indonesia Perdamaian 2018
Dilla Fadiela

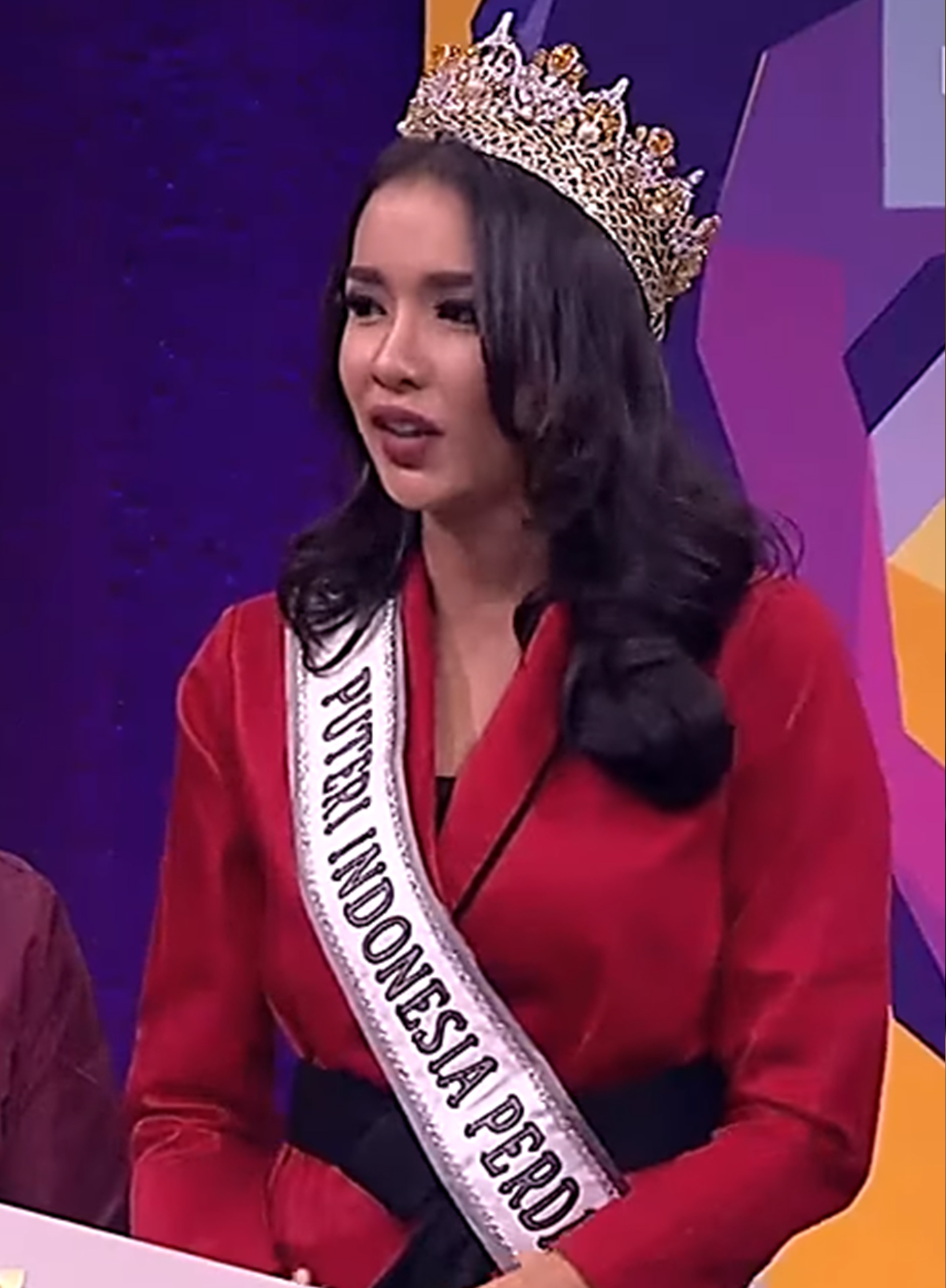
Puteri Indonesia Perdamaian 2017
Dea Goesti Rizkita Koswara

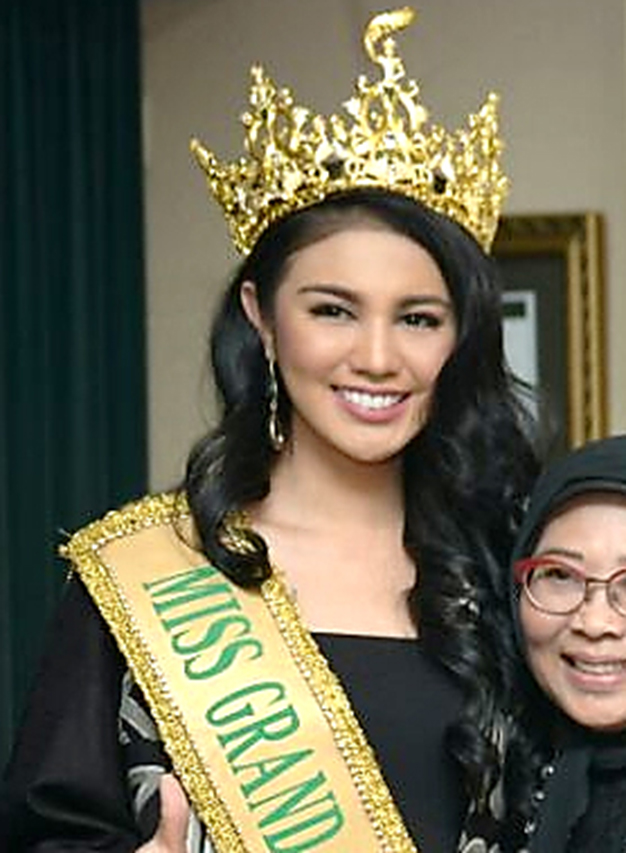
Puteri Indonesia Perdamaian 2016 & Miss Grand International 2016
Ariska Putri Pertiwi

== Titleholders ==
This is a list of women who have the title of Puteri Indonesia Pendidikan

Year	Province	Puteri Indonesia Pendidikan	International Pageant	Placement	Special Awards	Notes
Declared as Puteri Indonesia Perdamaian
2016	North Sumatra	Ariska Putri Pertiwi	Miss Grand International 2016	Miss Grand International 2016	Best in National Costume	Crowned as 3rd Runner-up later crowned as "Puteri Indonesia Perdamaian"
2017	Central Java	Dea Goesti Rizkita	Miss Grand International 2017	Top 10	Best in National Costume; Miss Popular Vote; Best in Arrival; Best in Official Portrait (Top 10); Best in Swimsuit (Top 10)	
2018	Yogyakarta SR	Dilla Fadiela	Did not compete			
Declared as Puteri Indonesia Pendidikan
2024	East Java	Melati Tedja	Miss Charm 2024	Top 6	Best in Social Media	Crowned as "Puteri Indonesia Pendidikan & Kebudayaan". The first Puteri Indonesia competed at Miss Charm
2025	East Kalimantan	Rinanda Aprillya Maharani	Miss Charm 2025	2nd Runner-up		
2026	Jakarta SCR	Gisela Belicia Alma Thesalonica Silalahi	Miss Charm 2026	TBA	TBA	TBA

=== Number of wins by Province ===
Province	Titles	Year(s)
Jakarta SCR	1	2026
East Kalimantan	1	2025
East Java	1	2024
Yogyakarta SR	1	2018
Central Java	1	2017
North Sumatra	1	2016

== Past International Pageants ==
=== Puteri Indonesia Perdamaian's Placement at Miss Grand International ===
Name of Pageant	Winner	2nd Runner-Up	3rd Runner-Up	4th Runner-Up	Top 10–12	Top 15–25	Total Placements
Miss Grand International	2016	-	-	-	2017	-	2
Total	(1) Winner	(0) 2nd Runner-up	(0) 3nd Runner-up	(0) 4th Runner-up	(1) Finalist	(0) Semi-finalist	2

== Before Puteri Indonesia Pendidikan ==
=== Miss Grand International Indonesia ===
Color key

- : Declared as Winner
- : Ended as runner-up
- : Ended as one of the finalists or semi-finalists
- : Ended as special awards winner

This is a list of woman who represented of Indonesia at the Miss Grand International beauty pageant before Puteri Indonesia DikBud.

Year	Province	Miss Grand International Indonesia	Placement	Special Awards	Notes
2013	North Sulawesi	Novia Indriani Mamuaja	Unplaced	Miss Popular Vote (Top 10)	
2014	Riau	Margenie Winarti	Top 10	Best Evening Gown	
2015	Maluku	Yolanda Viyanditya Remetwa	Unplaced	Miss Popular Vote (Top 10); Best in National Costume (Top 20)	

=== Miss Charm Indonesia ===
Color key

- : Declared as Winner
- : Ended as runner-up
- : Ended as one of the finalists or semi-finalists
- : Ended as special awards winner

This is a list of woman who represented of Indonesia at the Miss Charm beauty pageant before Puteri Indonesia DikBud.

Year	Province	Miss Charm Indonesia	Placement	Special Awards	Notes
2023	West Kalimantan	Olivia Tan	2nd Runner-up	Miss BlockCharm	

== See also ==
- Puteri Indonesia
- Puteri Indonesia Lingkungan
- Puteri Indonesia Pariwisata
- Puteri Indonesia Pendidikan & Kebudayaan (in Bahasa Indonesia)
- Miss Charm
