= National Institute of Technology (disambiguation) =

The National Institutes of Technology are a group of higher education engineering institutes in India.

National Institute of Technology may also refer to:

- National Institute of Technology (Indonesia)
- National Institute of Technology (Norway)
- National Institute of Technology (United States)
- Kumoh National Institute of Technology, South Korea
- National Institute of Technology (KOSEN), Japan, see Colleges of technology in Japan
- National Institute of Technology and Evaluation, Japan
- National Institute of Technology (Brazil)

== See also ==
- National Institute (disambiguation)
- Technology
