= Melliza Xaviera =

Indonesian beauty pageant titleholder (born 1999)

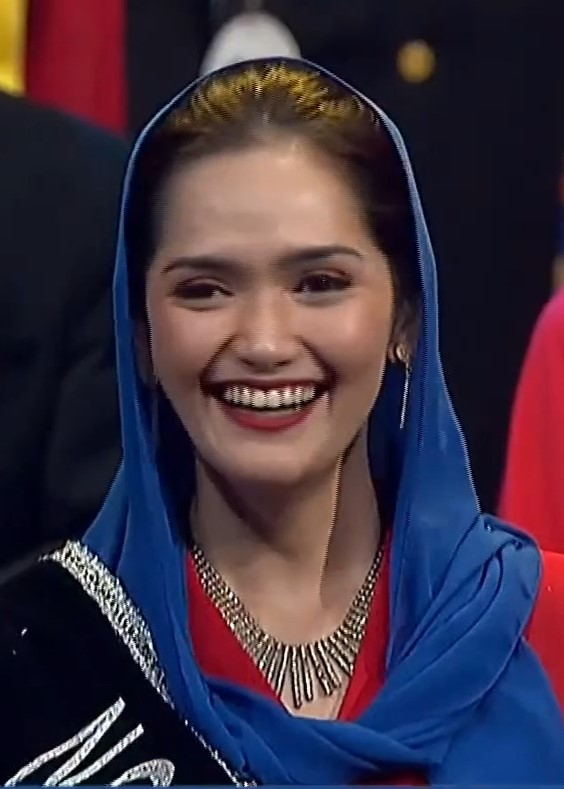
- Melliza in 2022
- Born: Melliza Xaviera Putri Yulian; May 21, 1999 (age 27); Yogyakarta, Special Region of Yogyakarta, Indonesia
- Education: University of Indonesia (dr.)
- Occupation: general practitioner
- Height: 174 cm (5 ft 9 in)
- Beauty pageant titleholder
- Title: Puteri Indonesia Lingkungan 2025; Miss International Indonesia 2025
- Years active: 2019—present
- Major competitions: Puteri Indonesia 2025; (1st Runner-up – Puteri Indonesia Lingkungan 2025); Miss International 2025; (3rd Runner-up)

Melliza Xaviera Putri Yulian (born May 21, 1999) is an Indonesian general practitioner, and beauty pageant titleholder who won Puteri Indonesia Lingkungan 2025. Melliza previously competed in the Abang None Jakarta 2019 competition and was selected as the main winner. She competed in Miss International 2025 in Japan and placed as third runner-up.

== Background and education ==
Melliza Xaviera Putri Yulian was born on May 21, 1999, in the city of Yogyakarta in the province of Special region of Yogyakarta.

Melliza completed her high school education at SMA Negeri 21 Jakarta from 2013 to 2016. She then attended Medical school at the National Development University "Veteran" of Jakarta, but resigned. In 2017, Melliza was accepted into the Faculty of Medicine, University of Indonesia (UI) Medical education program. In 2021, she graduated with a Bachelor of Medicine (S.Ked) degree with Cum Laude honors. Two years later, she graduated with as Doctor of Medicine from the same university.

== Pageantry ==
=== Abang None Jakarta 2019 ===
Melliza's first pageant was Abang None Jakarta 2019. She was the third female representative from the South Jakarta administrative area. The contest was held on July 12, 2019, at the Jakarta International Convention Center in Central Jakarta. She was the winner of None Jakarta 2019, paired with Muhammad Abror from East Jakarta as the winner of Abang Jakarta 2019.

=== Puteri Indonesia DKI Jakarta 1 2025 ===
In 2025, Melliza competed and won the title of Puteri Indonesia DKI Jakarta 1 2025 at Graha Mustika Ratu, Jakarta.

=== Puteri Indonesia 2025 ===
Melliza represented the province of DKI Jakarta and won Puteri Indonesia Lingkungan 2025, held at the Plenary Hall, Jakarta International Convention Center in Central Jakarta on May 2, 2025, which coincided with National Education Day. She was crowned by the previous title holder; Puteri Indonesia Lingkungan 2024 Sophie Kirana from the Special Region of Yogyakarta. She also won the Best Catwalk award, Puteri Indonesia Photogenic, and second runner-up of Best in Evening Gown.

=== Miss International 2025 ===
Melliza will represent Indonesia at Miss International 2025, to be held on 25 November 2025 in Tokyo, Japan. She is the fourth Indonesian doctor from the last five years to compete in the pageant, following Ayu Saraswati (2020; withdrew), Cindy May McGuire (2022), and Farhana Nariswari (2023).

== Advocacies and platforms ==
Meliza is an advocate and philanthropist. She initiated the "Happiness Project Indonesia" program, a campaign focused on mental health–dedicated to helping individuals find sources of happiness and achieve their self-actualization potential. This movement is based on her experience as a doctor and the observation that happiness affects a person's health. Melliza has been developing this program since 2019–it has collaborated with several non-profit organizations (NPOs), non-governmental organizations, local governments, and fundraised with Kitabisa.

Awards and achievements
Preceded by (Venezuela) Sakra Guerrero	3rd Runner-Up Miss International; 2025	Succeeded by Incumbent
Preceded by Sophie Kirana (Yogyakarta SR)	Miss International Indonesia; 2025	Succeeded by Victoria Kosasie (Bali)
Preceded by Sophie Kirana (Yogyakarta SR)	Puteri Indonesia Lingkungan; 2025	Succeeded by Victoria Kosasie (Bali)
Preceded by Ghina Raihanah	Puteri Indonesia DKI Jakarta 1; 2025	Succeeded by Athalla Hardian
Preceded by Athalla Hardian (South Jakarta)	None Jakarta; 2019	Succeeded by Zaida Jameela Heinrich (Thousand Islands)
