= Firsta Yufi =

Indonesian beauty pageant titleholder (born 2001)

- ꦥ꦳ꦶꦂꦱ꧀ꦠꦪꦸꦥ꦳ꦶꦄꦩꦂꦠꦥꦸꦠꦿꦶ
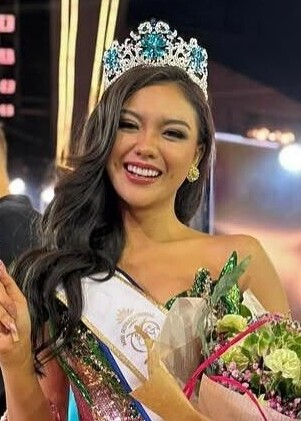
- Yufi in 2025
- Born: Firsta Yufi Amarta Putri; 1 March 2001 (age 25); Banyuwangi, East Java, Indonesia
- Education: Brawijaya University (S.Psi); Malang Cooperative Economics College (SM)
- Beauty pageant titleholder
- Title: Puteri Indonesia Jawa Timur 2025; Puteri Indonesia 2025; Miss Supranational Indonesia 2025; Miss Supranational Asia & Oceania 2025
- Major competitions: Puteri Indonesia Jawa Timur 2025; (Winner); Puteri Indonesia 2025; (Winner); Miss Supranational 2025; (Top 24)

Firsta Yufi Amarta Putri (Javanese: ꦥ꦳ꦶꦂꦱ꧀ꦠꦪꦸꦥ꦳ꦶꦄꦩꦂꦠꦥꦸꦠꦿꦶ; born March 1, 2001) is an Indonesian model and beauty pageant titleholder who was crowned Puteri Indonesia 2025. She represented Indonesia at Miss Supranational 2025 in Poland, where she reached the top 24 and won the title of Miss Supranational Asia & Oceania 2025.

Yufi is East Java's third representative to compete in Miss Supranational, following Adinda Cresheilla (2022) and Yasinta Aurellia (2023).

== Background and education ==
Firsta Yufi Amarta Putri was born in Banyuwangi Regency in East Java, Indonesia. She is the eldest daughter of Herry Yulistianto and Fitriana Okta Purwati. Firsta has Javanese and Osing ancestry from her parents. Both of her parents died from COVID in 2020 during the COVID-19 pandemic. She grew up in several cities such as Banyuwangi, Malang, and Surabaya.

Yufi was educated at SMA Negeri 1 Giri, Banyuwangi from 2016 to 2019. She received a Bachelor of Psychology (S.Psi) degree from Brawijaya University, Malang in 2022, and a Bachelor of Management degree from Malang Cooperative Economics College in 2023 Currently, she is a student at the University of August 17, 1945 Surabaya, studying for a Master of Management.

== Pageantry ==
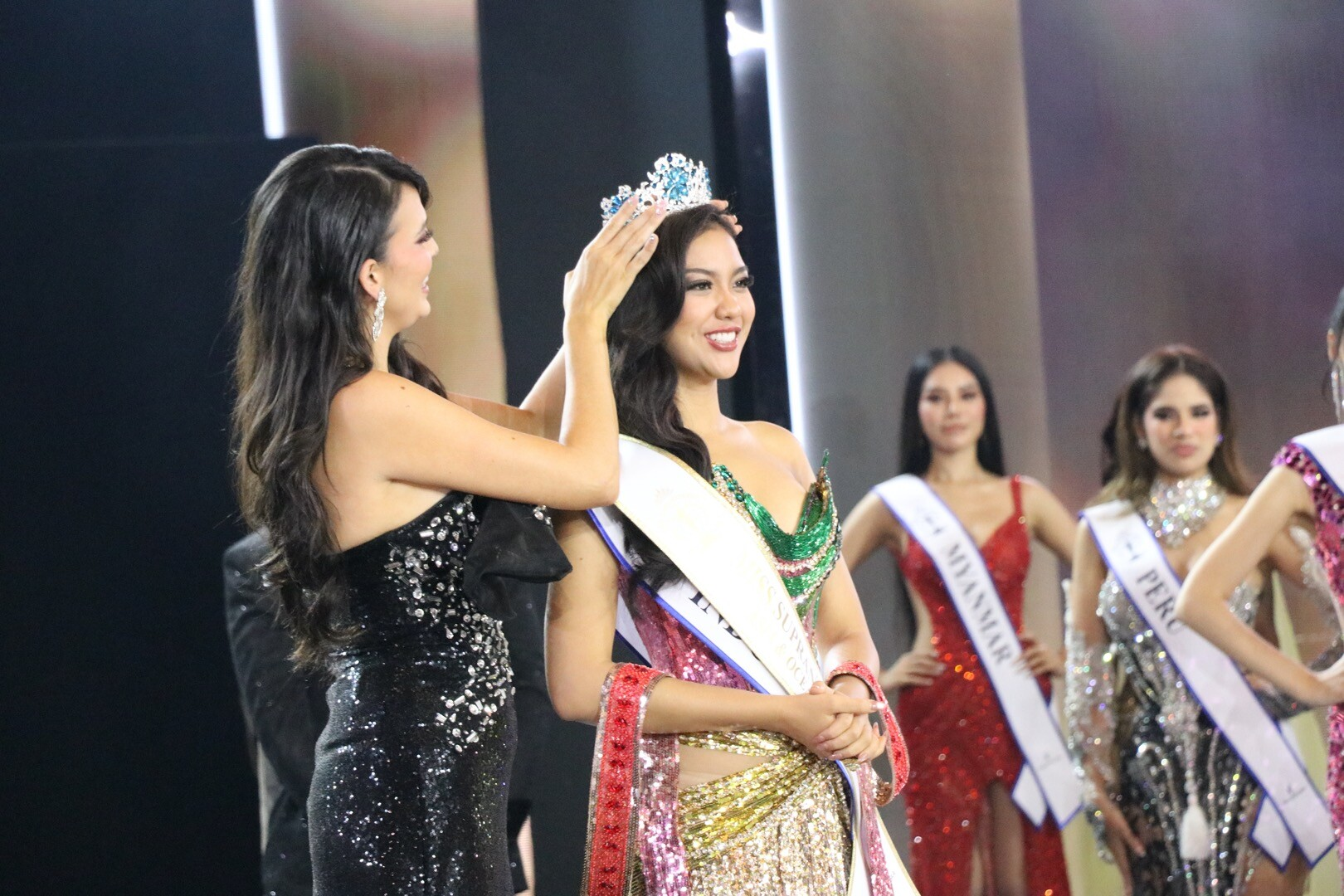
Yufi crowned Miss Supranational Asia & Oceania 2025 by Miss Supranational 2018, Valeria Vázquez.

Yufi's first pageant was in 2015, when she won Miss Sun East Mall. She later won Miss Teen Indonesia Jawa Timur in 2018, followed by the Miss Teen Tourism Indonesia title in the same year. Afterwards, she participated in the Banyuwangi Regency Jebeng Thulik Banyuwangi regional ambassador selection competition in 2019, where she was selected as Wakil I Jebeng Banyuwangi.

=== Raka & Raki Jawa Timur 2021 ===
In 2021, Yufi represented and won Banyuwangi Regency at Raka & Raki Jawa Timur 2021, on October 26, 2021 at the Shangri-La Hotel, Surabaya.

=== Puteri Indonesia Jawa Timur 2025 ===
In 2025, Yufi entered and won Puteri Indonesia Jawa Timur 2025, representing Banyuwangi Regency. The contest was held on January 12, 2025 at Novotel Samator, Surabaya. She was crowned by her predecessor Melati Tedja from Surabaya. As the titleholder, she would represent East Java at Puteri Indonesia 2025.

=== Puteri Indonesia 2025 ===
Yufi represented the province of East Java and won the national beauty contest Puteri Indonesia 2025. The contest was held at the Plenary Hall, Jakarta International Convention Center in Central Jakarta on May 2, 2025.

She was crowned by the previous title holder; Puteri Indonesia 2024 Harashta Haifa Zahra from West Java. In the preliminary session, she won the Best Video Profile award, and was a nominee for Best in National Costume.

=== Miss Supranational 2025 ===
Yufi represented Indonesia at Miss Supranational 2025, in Nowy Sącz, Poland, against 65 competitors from various countries and territories. She received places in several pre-pageant events, including the top 20 of the Miss Influencer Opportunity, top 10 of the Supra Fan Vote, and the top nine finalists of the talent competition.

At the final, Yufi reached the top 24 and was given the title of Miss Supranational Asia & Oceania 2025. This is given to the highest-ranking contestant from the Asia and Oceania region, who does not reach the top 5. She became the second Indonesian woman to win the title, following Jihane Almira Chedid in 2021. The contest was won by Eduarda Braum of Brazil.

Awards and achievements
Preceded by (Philippines) Alethea Ambrosio	Miss Supranational Asia & Oceania; 2025	Succeeded by (Indonesia) Agnes Rahajeng
Preceded by Harashta Haifa Zahra (West Java)	Miss Supranational Indonesia; 2025	Succeeded by Agnes Rahajeng (Banten)
Preceded by Harashta Haifa Zahra (West Java)	Puteri Indonesia; 2025	Succeeded by Agnes Rahajeng (Banten)
Preceded by Melati Tedja	Puteri Indonesia Jawa Timur; 2025	Succeeded by Rayya Haq
