= National Institute of Business Management =

National Institute of Business Management may refer to:

- National Institute of Bank Management (Pune), India
- National Institute of Business Management (Sri Lanka)

== See also ==
- National Institute (disambiguation)
