= Harashta Haifa Zahra =

Indonesian beauty pageant titleholder (born 2003)

- ᮠᮛᮞ᮪ᮂᮒ ᮠᮄᮖ ᮐᮠᮁ
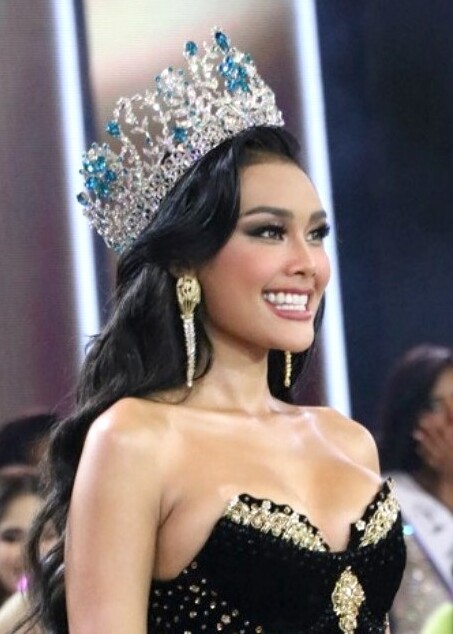
- Zahra in 2025
- Born: Harashta Haifa Zahra; September 5, 2003 (age 23); Garut, West Java, Indonesia
- Education: National Institute of Technology (BE)
- Height: 1.73 m (5 ft 8 in)
- Beauty pageant titleholder
- Title: Puteri Indonesia 2024; Miss Supranational Indonesia 2024; Miss Supranational 2024
- Major competitions: Puteri Indonesia 2024; (Winner); Miss Supranational 2024; (Winner)

Harashta Haifa Zahra (Sundanese: ᮠᮛᮞ᮪ᮂᮒ ᮠᮄᮖ ᮐᮠᮁ; born September 5, 2003) is an Indonesian beauty pageant titleholder who won Miss Supranational 2024 and Puteri Indonesia 2024. She is the first Indonesian to win Miss Supranational.

== Early life and education ==
Harashta Haifa Zahra was born on September 5, 2003, in Garut Regency, West Java and grew up in Bandung, West Java, Indonesia. Her father, Ginanjar, is an entrepreneur from Bandung, and her mother, Yeni Yuliani, is from Peundeuy, Garut Regency.

In 2017, Zahra began SMA Negeri 2 Bandung high school, graduating in 2020. In 2024, she began a Bachelor of Engineering (S.T.) degree at the National Institute of Technology Bandung (ITENAS).

== Pageantry ==
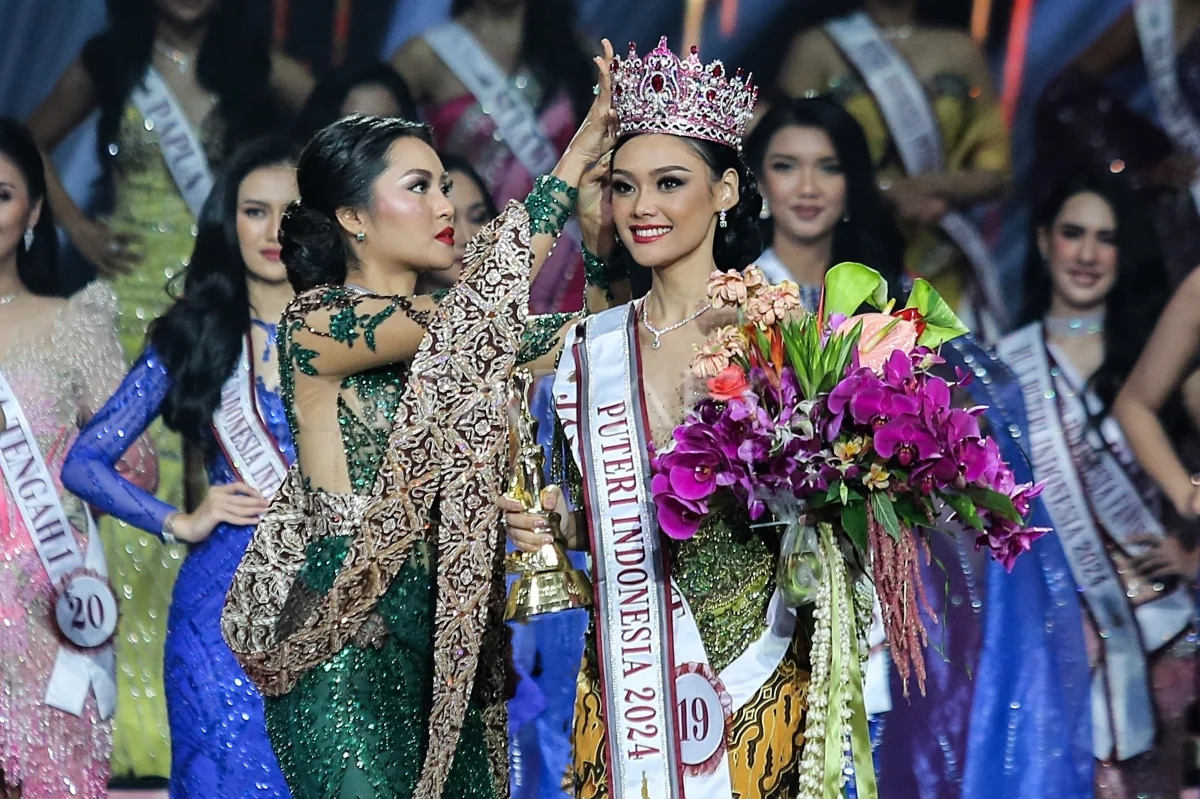
Zahra (right) crowned as Puteri Indonesia 2024 by Farhana Nariswari of West Java (left)

Zahra's first pageant was Bandung Regency Mojang Jajaka Kabupaten Bandung regional ambassador selection competition in 2022, where she was selected as Wakil II as Mojang Kabupaten Bandung 2022.

=== Puteri Jawa Barat 2024 ===
In 2024, Zahra took part and won the Puteri Indonesia 2024 selection event at Graha Mustika Ratu in Jakarta. As the winner, Zahra represented West Java at Puteri Indonesia 2024.

=== Puteri Indonesia 2024 ===
On March 8, 2024, coinciding with International Women's Day, Zahra won Puteri Indonesia 2024 at the Plenary Hall, Jakarta Convention Center in Central Jakarta.

In the final round, Zahra was asked by the chair of the advisory board of the Yayasan Puteri Indonesia, Putri Kuswisnu Wardani about the role of women in accelerating nation development. She replied, "The role of women in accelerating national development is certainly very important and requires working together between women and men."

Zahra was crowned by her predecessor, Puteri Indonesia 2023 Farhana Nariswari from West Java. Zahra became the second Sundanese representative to win this title, and the first time the same province had won for two consecutive years at the contest.

=== Miss Supranational 2024 ===
As the winner of Puteri Indonesia 2024, Zahra represented Indonesia at Miss Supranational 2024 on July 6, 2024, in Nowy Sacz, Lesser Poland, Poland. Zahra was crowned as the winner at the end of the event, making her the first Indonesian and sixth Asian woman to win this title after Anntonia Porsild of Thailand in the 11th edition.

== Advocacies and platforms ==
Zahra is an activist, advocate, and environmentalist. She began a campaign called the Mother of Nature, that focused on the issue of food loss and waste, in her hometown. Harashta also serves as Indonesian Ambassador for Scholars of Sustenance (SOS), a Thailand-based non-profit food rescue organization. It aimed to change people's mindsets about food waste to help reduce the impact of climate change and food security.

Awards and achievements
Preceded by (Ecuador) Andrea Aguilera	Miss Supranational; 2024	Succeeded by (Brazil) Eduarda Braum
Preceded by Yasinta Aurellia (East Java)	Miss Supranational Indonesia; 2024	Succeeded by Firsta Yufi (East Java)
Preceded by Farhana Nariswari (West Java)	Puteri Indonesia; 2024	Succeeded by Firsta Yufi (East Java)
Preceded by Farhana Nariswari	Puteri Indonesia West Java; 2024	Succeeded by Ratu Ayu Salsabila
