= Puteri Indonesia Lingkungan =

Indonesian beauty pageant title

- Logo of the Puteri Indonesia org.
- Type: Beauty pageant
- Headquarters: Jakarta, Indonesia
- Location: Indonesia
- Official language: Indonesian; English
- President and CEO: The Royal Highest Princess Mooryati Soedibyo of the Surakarta Sunanate
- Chairperson: The Royal Highest Princess Putri Kuswisnu Wardani of the Surakarta Sunanate
- Key people: Miss Supranational; The Royal Highest Family of Surakarta Sunanate Mustika Ratu
- Affiliations: Puteri Indonesia
- Website: www.puteri-indonesia.com

Puteri Indonesia Lingkungan ("Environmental Princess of Indonesia") is a beauty pageant title organized by Puteri Indonesia Organization. Until 2022, it was established that the titleholder of Puteri Indonesia Lingkungan was to be sent to the Miss International pageant. Starting 2024, the titleholder of Puteri Indonesia Lingkungan will compete in an international beauty pageant that is decided by the Puteri Indonesia organization after Puteri Indonesia competition ends. The options include Miss International, Miss Supranational, Miss Charm, and Miss Cosmo.

The reigning Puteri Indonesia Lingkungan 2026 is Victoria Veronica Titisari Kosasieputri of Bali, who was crowned on 24 April 2026 in Jakarta International Convention Center.

== Gallery of winners ==
The winners of Puteri Indonesia Lingkungan

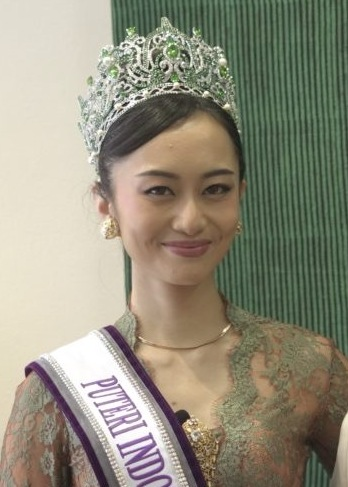
Puteri Indonesia Lingkungan 2026
Victoria Veronica Titisari Kosasieputri

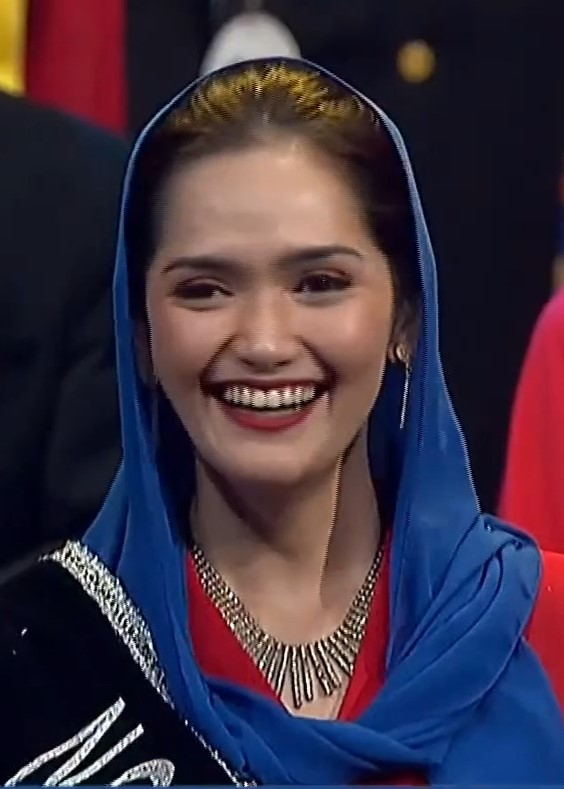
Puteri Indonesia Lingkungan 2025
Melliza Xaviera Putri Yulian

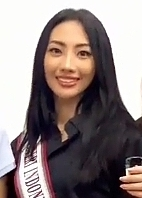
Puteri Indonesia Lingkungan 2024
Sophie Kirana

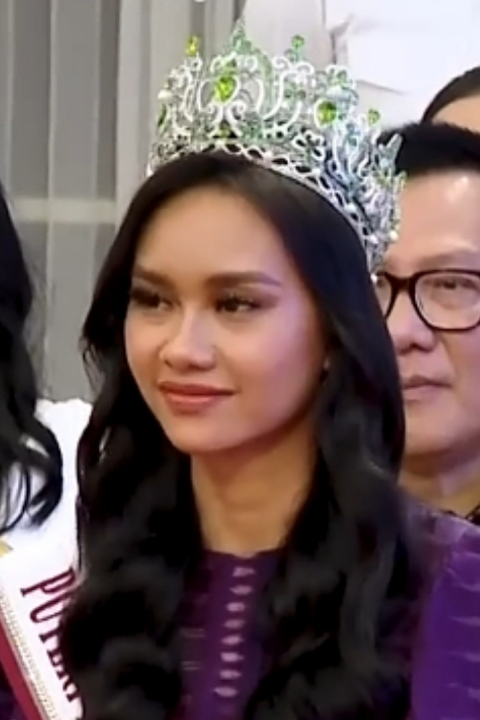
Puteri Indonesia Lingkungan 2023
Yasinta Aurellia

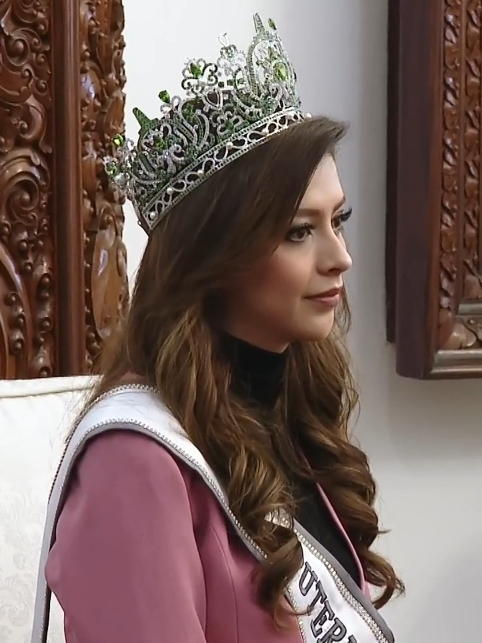
Puteri Indonesia Lingkungan 2022
Cindy May McGuire

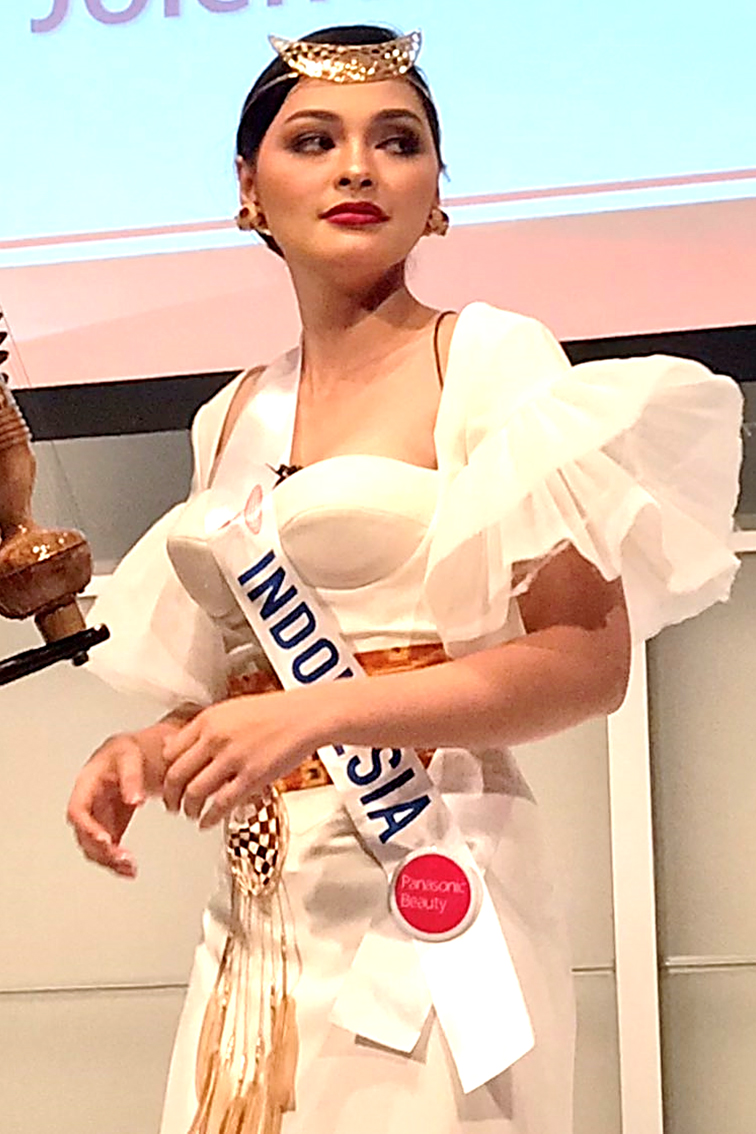
Puteri Indonesia Lingkungan 2019
Jolene Marie Cholock-Rotinsulu

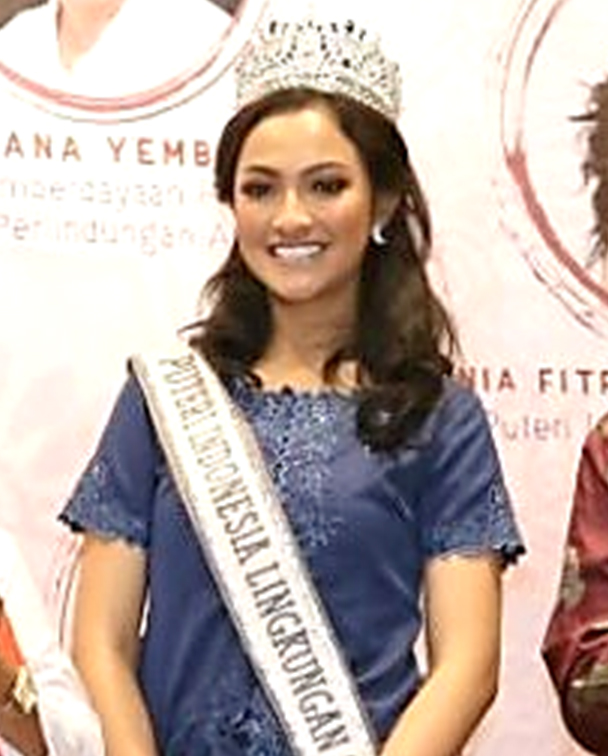
Puteri Indonesia Lingkungan 2018
Vania Fitryanti Herlambang

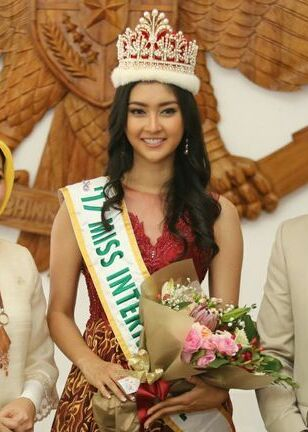
Puteri Indonesia Lingkungan 2017 & Miss International 2017
Kevin Lilliana

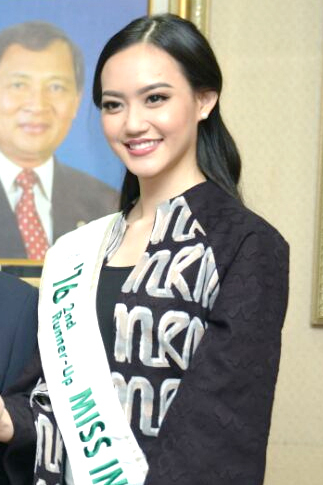
Puteri Indonesia Lingkungan 2016
Felicia Hwang Yi Xin

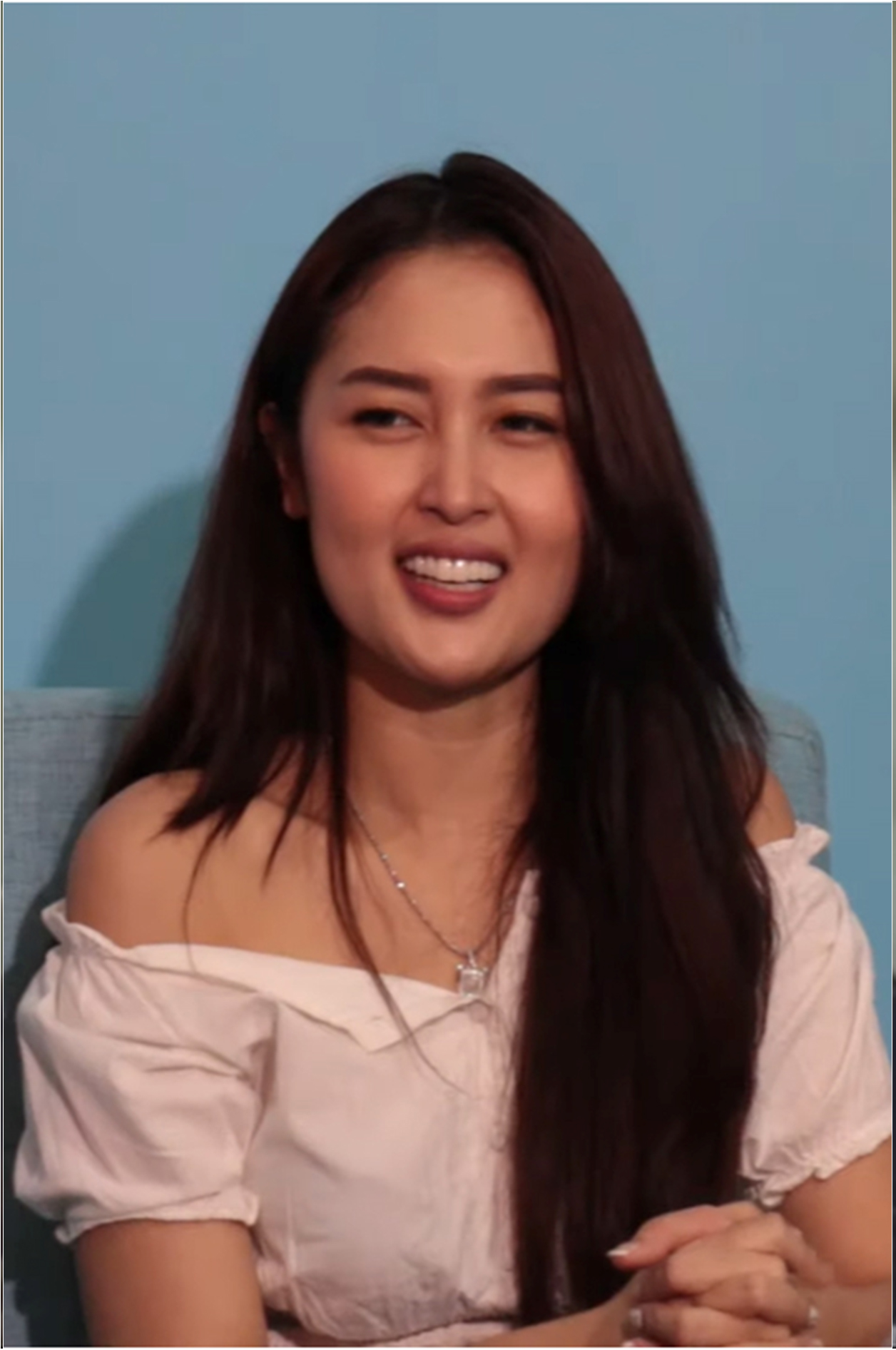
Puteri Indonesia Lingkungan 2015
Chintya Fabyola

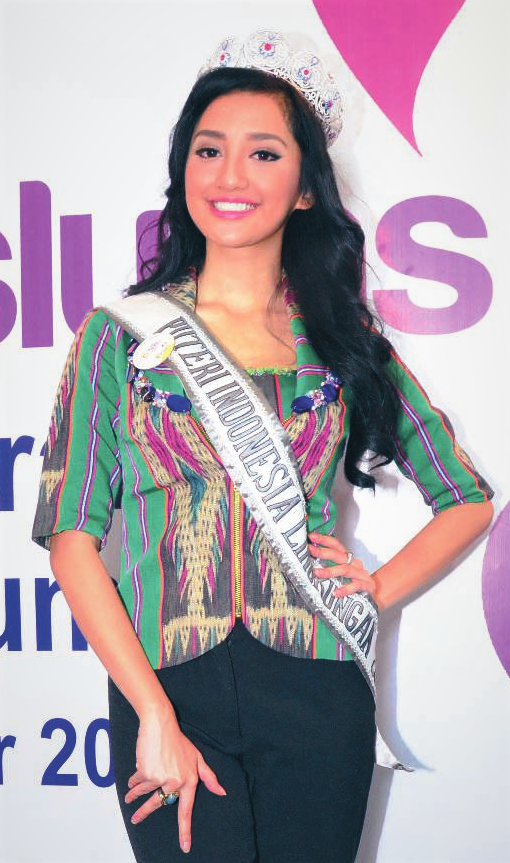
Puteri Indonesia Lingkungan 2014
Elfin Pertiwi Rappa

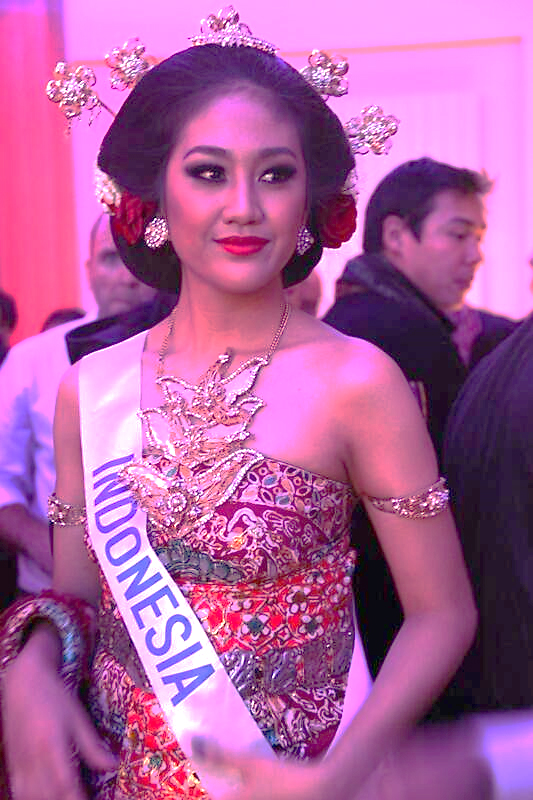
Puteri Indonesia Lingkungan 2012-2013
Marisa Sartika Maladewi

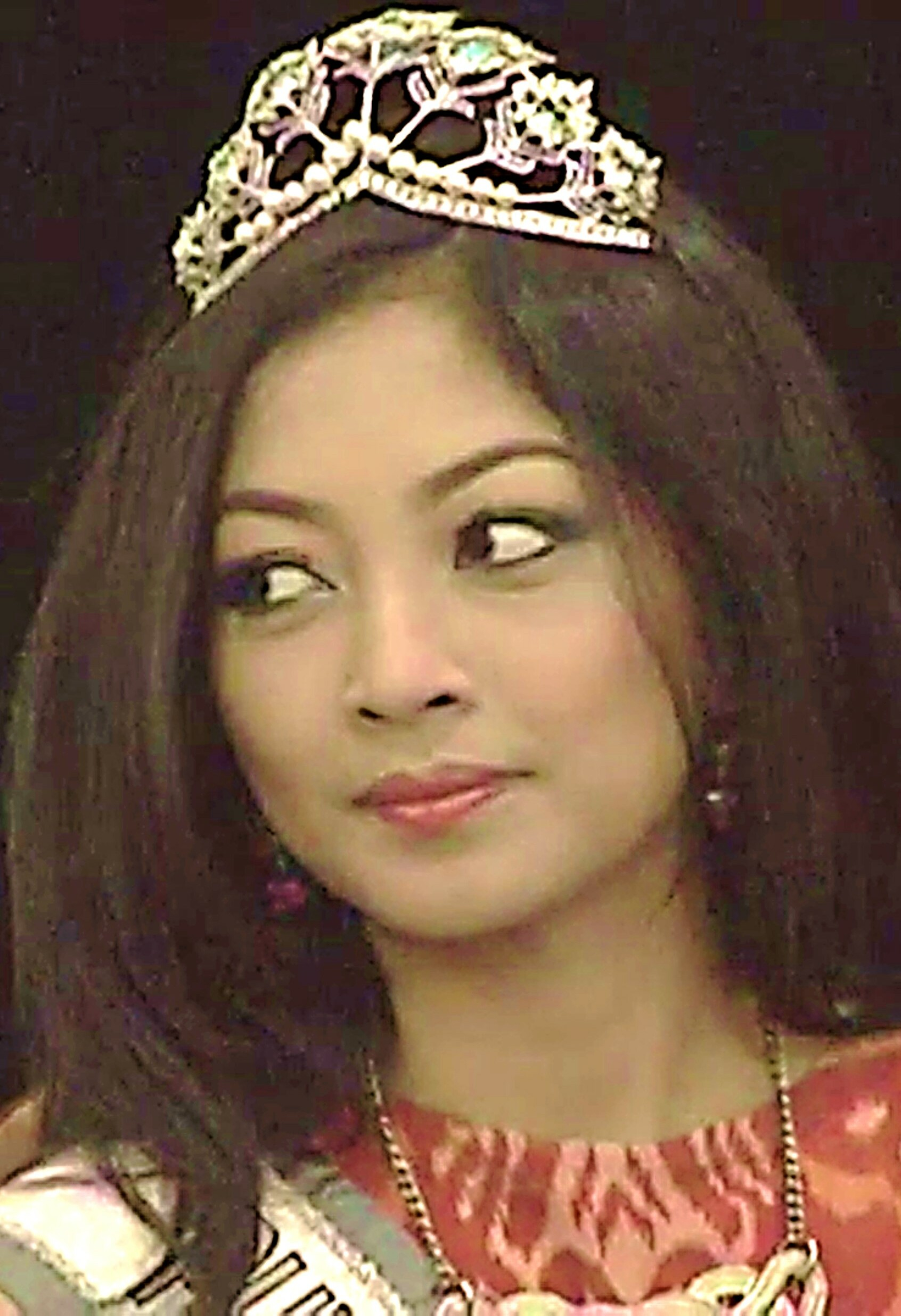
Puteri Indonesia Lingkungan 2011
Fiorenza Liza Elly Purnamasari

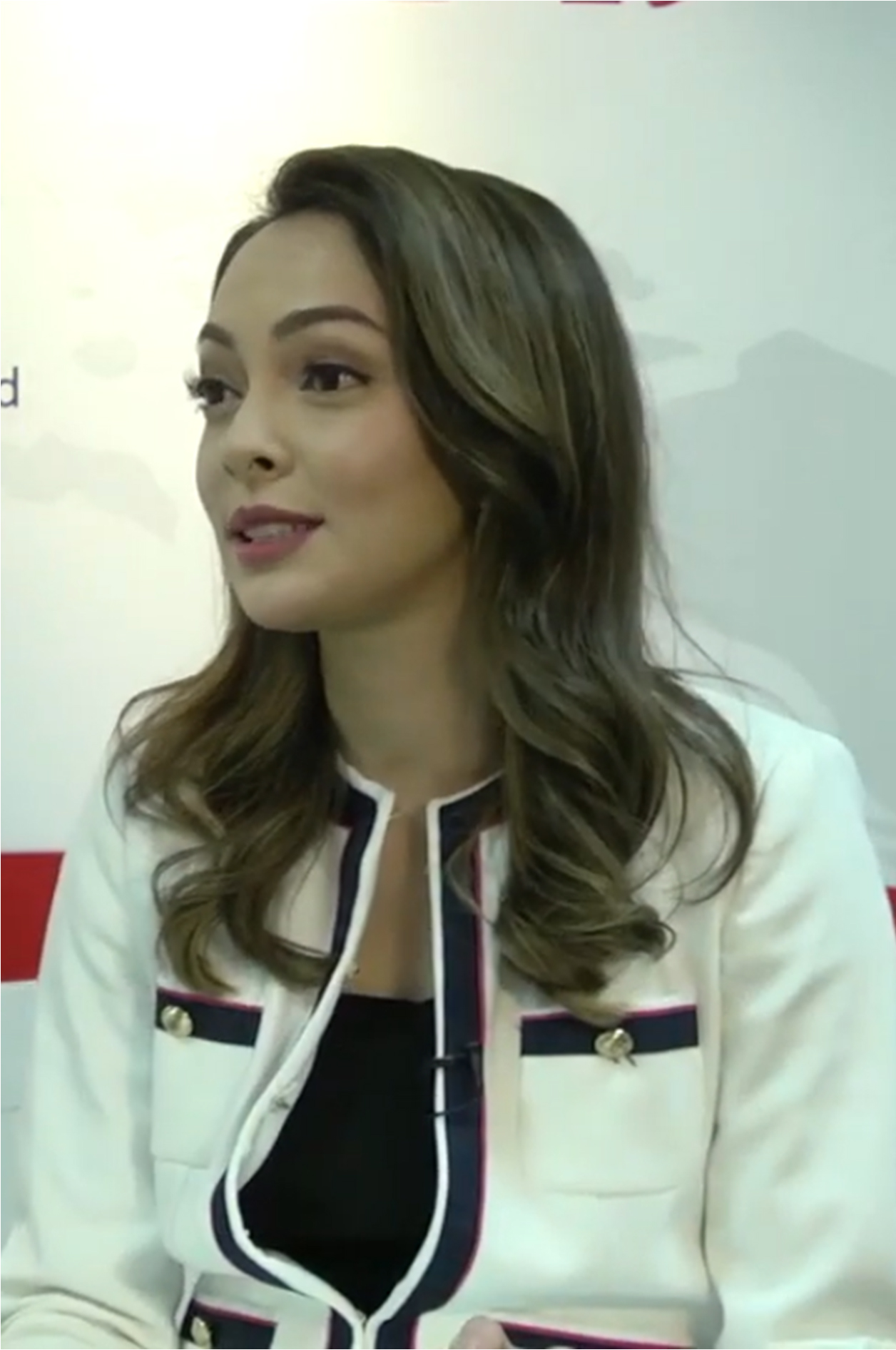
Puteri Indonesia Lingkungan 2010
Reisa Kartikasari Broto Asmoro

== Titleholders ==
This is a list of Puteri Indonesia Lingkungan titleholders.

Year	Province	Puteri Indonesia Lingkungan	International Pageant	Placement	Special Awards	Notes
2006	South Kalimantan	Ananda Krista Algani	Miss Asia Pacific 2007	Contest canceled		
2007	North Sumatra	Duma Riris Silalahi	Miss International 2008	Unplaced		The first "Puteri Indonesia Lingkungan" competed at Miss International
2008	Bali	Ayu Diandra Sari Tjakra	Miss International 2009	Unplaced	People's Choice Award	
2009	West Sumatra	Zukhriatul Hafizah Muhammad	Miss International 2010	Unplaced	Miss Friendship	
2010	DI Yogyakarta	Reisa Kartikasari Brotoasmoro	Miss International 2011	Unplaced		
2011	East Java	Fiorenza Liza Elly Purnamasari	Miss International 2012	Unplaced		
2013	South Sumatra	Marisa Sartika Maladewi	Miss International 2013	Unplaced	Miss Beauty with Voice (Top 5)	
2014	South Sumatra	Elfin Pertiwi Rappa	Miss International 2014	Top 10	Best National Costume	
2015	West Kalimantan	Chintya Fabyola	Miss International 2015	Unplaced	Best National Costume (Top 5)	
2016	Lampung	Felicia Hwang Yi Xin	Miss International 2016	2nd Runner-up	Miss Best Dresser	
2017	West Java	Kevin Lilliana	Miss International 2017	Miss International 2017	Miss Best Dresser; Miss People's Choice Award – Missosology; Miss Panasonic, Sponsor (1st Runner-up)	
2018	Banten	Vania Fitryanti Herlambang	Miss International 2018	Top 15	Miss Panasonic Beauty Ambassador	
2019	North Sulawesi	Jolene Marie Cholock-Rotinsulu	Miss International 2019	Top 8	Miss Panasonic Beauty Ambassador; People's Choice Award by Missosology	
2020	Bali	Putu Ayu Saraswati	Miss International 2021	Contest canceled		
2022	Jakarta SCR 5	Cindy May McGuire	Miss International 2022	Unplaced		
2023	East Java	Yasinta Aurellia	Miss Supranational 2023	Top 24	Supra Fan-Vote (Top 10); Miss Supra Influencer (Top 7); Miss Talent (Top 29)	The first "Puteri Indonesia Lingkungan" competed at Miss Supranational
2024	DI Yogyakarta	Sophie Kirana	Miss International 2024	4th Runner-up		
2025	Jakarta SCR 1	Melliza Xaviera Putri Yulian	Miss International 2025	3rd Runner-up		
2026	Bali	Victoria Veronica Titisari Kosasieputri	Miss International 2026	TBA	TBA	TBA

=== Number of wins by province ===
Province	Titles	Year(s)
Bali	3	2008, 2020, 2026
Jakarta	2	2022, 2025
Yogyakarta	2	2010, 2024
East Java	2	2011, 2023
South Sumatra	2	2013, 2014
North Sulawesi	1	2019
Banten	1	2018
West Java	1	2017
Lampung	1	2016
West Kalimantan	1	2015
West Sumatra	1	2009
North Sumatra	1	2007
South Kalimantan	1	2006

== Puteri Indonesia Lingkungan's Placement at International Pageant ==
=== Miss International ===
Name of Pageant	Winner	2nd Runner-Up	3rd Runner-Up	4th Runner-Up	Top 8-10	Top 15	Total Placements
Miss International	2017	2016	2025	2024	2014 • 2019	2018	7
Total	(1) Winner	(1) 2nd Runner-up	(1) 3rd Runner-up	(1) 4th Runner-up	(2) Finalist	(1) Semi-Finalist	7

=== Miss Supranational ===
Name of Pageant	Winner	Top 10-12	Top 20-25	Total Placements
Miss Supranational	-		2023	1
Total	-		(1) Semi-Finalist	1

== Before Puteri Indonesia Lingkungan ==
=== Miss International Indonesia ===
Color key

- : Declared as Winner
- : Ended as runner-up
- : Ended as one of the finalists or semi-finalists
- : Ended as special awards winner

This is a list of women who represented of Indonesia at the Miss International beauty pageant before Puteri Indonesia Lingkungan.

Year	Name	National Title	Province Represented	Placement at Miss International	Special Awards
1960	Wiana Sulastini	Miss Java	Jakarta SCR		
1968	Sylvia Taliwongso	Miss Indonesia Programme	Jakarta SCR		
1969	Irma Priscilla Hadisurya	Miss Indonesia Programme	West Java		
1970	Louise Marie Dominique Maengkom	Putri Indonesia	North Sulawesi		
1974	Lydia Arlini Wahab	Putri Indonesia	Jakarta SCR		
1975	Yayuk Rahayu Sosiawati	Putri Indonesia	Central Java		
1976	Treesye Ratri Astuti	Putri Duta Nusantara Indonesia	Central Java	Top 15	
1977	Indri Hapsari Suharto	Putri Duta Nusantara Indonesia	Central Java	2nd Runner-up	
2007	Rahma Landy Sjahruddin	Puteri Indonesia Pariwisata	Jakarta SCR	Top 15	

=== Miss Supranational Indonesia ===
Color key

- : Declared as Winner
- : Ended as runner-up
- : Ended as one of the finalists or semi-finalists
- : Ended as special awards winner

This is a list of women who represented of Indonesia at the Miss Supranational beauty pageant before Puteri Indonesia Lingkungan.

Year	Province	Miss Supranational Indonesia	National Title	Placement	Special Awards
2013	Bali	Cokorda Istri Krisnanda Widani	Puteri Indonesia Pariwisata 2013	3rd Runner-up	
2014	DI Yogyakarta	Lily Estelita Liana	Puteri Indonesia Pariwisata 2014	Unplaced	Best National Costume
2015	North Sulawesi	Gresya Amanda Maaliwuga	Puteri Indonesia Pariwisata 2015	Unplaced	Best National Costume; Best Evening Gown (Top 10)
2016	West Sumatra	Intan Aletrinö	Puteri Indonesia Pariwisata2016	Top 10	Miss Multimedia Award; Miss Popularity; Miss Elegance
2017	East Nusa Tenggara	Karina Nadila Niab	Puteri Indonesia Pariwisata 2017	Top 25	Miss Popularity; Best in Evening Gown
2018	West Kalimantan	Wilda Octaviana Situngkir	Puteri Indonesia Pariwisata 2018	3rd Runner-up	Best National Costume; Miss Supra Model of Asia; Miss Popularity; Miss Global Beauties Choice; Sponsor – Beautiful Piece of Jewelry Winner; Royal Dinner Winner; Pre-Arrival (Top 5); Photoshoot with Raymond Saldana (top 10)
2019	West Java	Jesica Fitriana Martasari	Puteri Indonesia Pariwisata 2019	2nd Runner-up	Supra Fan Vote Winner; Women of Substance; Best National Costume (2nd Runner-up)
2021	Central Java	Jihane Almira Chedid	Puteri Indonesia Pariwisata 2020	Top 12	Miss Supranational Asia; Miss Congeniality; Best National Costume; Supra Fan-Vote Winner; Supra Chat Winner Group 4; Supra Fan-Vote (Top 10); Miss Elegance (Top 11)
2022	East Java	Adinda Cresheilla	Puteri Indonesia Pariwisata 2022	3rd Runner-up	Supra Chat Winner; Best Talent (Top 6); Supra Fan-Vote (Top 10); Supra Model of the Year (Top 11); Miss Elegance (Top 15); Miss Supra Influencer (Top 42)

== See also ==
- Puteri Indonesia
- Puteri Indonesia Pariwisata
- Puteri Indonesia Lingkungan (in Bahasa Indonesia)
- Miss International
- Miss International Indonesia

== Notes ==
- Putu Ayu Saraswati is a doctor and Indonesian People's Consultative Assembly Ambassador.
