= Institute of Oceanography =

Institute of Oceanography may refer to:

- Bedford Institute of Oceanography
- Florida Institute of Oceanography
- Skidaway Institute of Oceanography

== See also ==
- Oceanographic Institute (disambiguation)
- National Institute of Oceanography (disambiguation)
