= Ketut Permata Juliastrid =

Indonesian beauty pageant titleholder (born 2003)

Ketut Permata Juliastrid Sari
- ᬓᬾᬢᬸᬢ᭄ᬧᬾᬃᬫᬢᬚᬸᬮᬶᬬᬲ᭄ᬢ᭄ᬭᬶᬤ᭄ᬲᬭᬶ
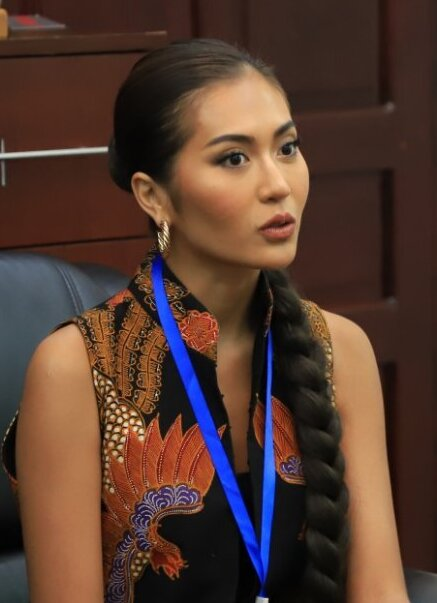
- Born: Ketut Permata Juliastrid Sari; 12 July 2003 (age 23); Denpasar, Bali, Indonesia
- Other name: Tata Juliastrid
- Education: Bali Institute of Design and Business (Fashion Design)
- Height: 1.76 m (5 ft 9 in)
- Beauty pageant titleholder
- Title: Puteri Indonesia Bali 2024; Puteri Indonesia Pariwisata 2024; Miss Cosmo Indonesia 2024; Miss Cosmo 2024
- Major competitions: Puteri Indonesia Bali 2024 (Winner); Puteri Indonesia 2024 (2nd Runner-up – Puteri Indonesia Pariwisata 2024); Miss Cosmo 2024 (Winner)

Ketut Permata Juliastrid Sari is an Indonesian beauty pageant titleholder who won Miss Cosmo 2024. She had previously won Puteri Indonesia Pariwisata 2024.

== Early life and education ==
Ketut Permata Juliastrid Sari was born 12 July 2003, and grew up in Sanur, a tourist village, Denpasar. She is the fourth child of Balinese couple I Ketut Tawan and Dwi Astuti "Wiwied" Tawan.

As of 2024, Juliastrid is a student at the Bali Institute of Design and Business in Denpasar. She has been studying Fashion Design for a Bachelor of Applied Design degree since 2022. She previously studied Management at Udayana University.

== Pageantry ==
On 27 February 2024, during the Puteri Indonesia 2024 quarantine period, Juliastrid and all the contestants were appointed as Ambassadors for the Indonesian Food and Drug Authority (BPOM) as Influencers of Safe Cosmetics. On 6 March 2024, she and all the other contestants were also appointed as Ambassadors of the Corruption Eradication Commission of the Republic of Indonesia (KPK) as Anti-Corruption Influencers. This is a form of initiative because they are considered to "have a special role as educators, motivators, initiators, facilitators and advocates" for eradicating corruption in Indonesia.

In March 2024, together with the other winners of Puteri Indonesia 2024; Harashta Haifa Zahra, Sophie Kirana, and Melati Tedja, Juliastrid were appointed as brand ambassadors for Bank Central Asia (BCA). This appointment is one of the results of collaboration between organizations and companies as one of the main sponsors of the contest since the previous edition. It aims to find women with potential to promote products from Bank Central Asia during their one-year term of office.

=== Puteri Indonesia Bali 2024 ===
In 2024, Juliastrid made her pageantry debut and won at Puteri Indonesia Bali 2024, held at Balai Giri Nata Mandala, Badung Regency on 27 January 2024. She was crowned by her predecessor Nanda Widya Saraswati from Denpasar. As Puteri Indonesia Bali 2024, she represented Bali at Puteri Indonesia 2024.

=== Puteri Indonesia 2024 ===
After winning Puteri Indonesia Bali 2024, Juliastrid represented the province of Bali at Puteri Indonesia 2024, held at the Plenary Hall, Jakarta Convention Center in Central Jakarta on 8 March 2024. The pageant was part of International Women's Day.

At the end of the event, Juliastrid was second runner up and won the title Princess of Indonesia Tourism 2024, she was crowned by her predecessor Puteri Indonesia Pariwisata 2023, Lulu Zaharani Krisna from Lampung. Juliastrid is the second Hindu Balinese woman to be crowned Puteri Indonesia Pariwisata after Cok Istri Krisnanda Widani at Puteri Indonesia 2013.

=== Miss Cosmo 2024 ===
Juliastrid won Miss Cosmo 2024, on 5 October 2024 in Ho Chi Minh City, Vietnam, representing Indonesia.

== Advocacies and platforms ==
Juliastrid is a tourism activist, for the preservation of culture and the natural landscape in her hometown Bali. She focuses on responsible tourism practices that can benefit the environment and surrounding communities in Bali. Through this, Juliastrid aims to provide an understanding of the importance of preserving nature and the integrity of Balinese culture.

Awards and achievements
Preceded by Nanda Widya Saraswati	Puteri Indonesia Bali; 2024	Succeeded by Ayu Natasya Amanda
Preceded by Lulu Zaharani	Puteri Indonesia Pariwisata; 2024	Succeeded by Salma Ranggita Cahyariyani
Preceded by None	Miss Cosmo Indonesia; 2024	Succeeded by Salma Ranggita Cahyariyani
Preceded by None	Miss Cosmo; 2024	Succeeded by (United States) Yolina Lindquist
Preceded by None	Cosmo Beauty Icon Award; 2024	Succeeded by (Panama) Italy Mora
