= Victoria Kosasie =

Indonesian artist and beauty pageant titleholder

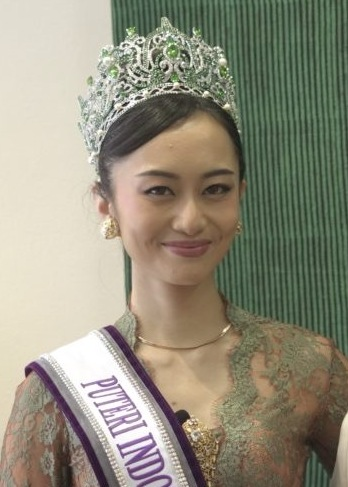
- Kosasie in 2026
- Born: Victoria Veronica Titisari Kosasieputri; February 7, 2000 (age 26); Jakarta, Indonesia
- Other names: Vickay; VK
- Education: Central Saint Martins (BA); Royal College of Art (MA)
- Occupation: Artist
- Beauty pageant titleholder
- Title: Puteri Indonesia Lingkungan 2026; Miss International Indonesia 2026
- Major competitions: Puteri Indonesia 2026; (1st Runner-Up — Puteri Indonesia Lingkungan); Miss International 2026; (TBD)
- Website: victoriakosasie.com

Victoria Veronica Titisari Kosasieputri (born February 7, 2000), known as Victoria Kosasie, is an Indonesian artist, and beauty pageant titleholder who was crowned as Puteri Indonesia Lingkungan (Environment) 2026. She will represent Indonesia at the Miss International 2026 pageant to be held in Japan.

== Background and education ==
Victoria Veronica Titisari Kosasieputri was born on February 7, 2000, in Jakarta, Indonesia. She is the second daughter of Alexander Kecil Kosasie, a Chinese-Indonesian businessman from Bali, and Ratih Soe Kosasie, a tango dancer and former model from Malang, East Java. Victoria has a sister named Alexandra "Anda" Kosasie. In 2002, the Kosasie family relocated from South Jakarta to Badung, Bali, to expand their family business.

As a child, Victoria studied various instruments, including piano and guitar, and was active in singing. As a teenager she explored contemporary performing arts. She completed her secondary education at Canggu International School, Bali in 2016. In 2022 she completed a B.A. in Fine and Studio Arts from Central Saint Martins, University of the Arts London. In 2025, she complete an M.A. in Contemporary Art Practice at the Royal College of Art, London, supported by the Deputy Vice Chancellor International Scholarship.

== Pageantry ==
=== Puteri Indonesia Bali 2026 ===
In 2026, Victoria began the selection process for Puteri Indonesia 2026. On February 24, 2026, she participated in the third-stage audition online from London and was selected as Puteri Indonesia Bali 2026, earning the right to represent the Province of Bali at the national competition. Following this success, Victoria resigned from her job in London and returned to Indonesia to fully prepare for the pageant.

=== Puteri Indonesia 2026 ===
Victoria then represented Bali at Puteri Indonesia 2026, held at Plenary Hall, Jakarta International Convention Center, Central Jakarta, on April 24, 2026. She the Best Catwalk, Best Talent, and Best Profile Video awards, and was third Best Evening Gown award. At the end of the event, Victoria reached the top four and was crowned Puteri Indonesia Lingkungan 2026 by her predecessor, Melliza Xaviera from Jakarta SCR 1. Victoria became the third woman from Bali to win this title, after Ayu Diandra Sari Tjakra in 2008 and Putu Ayu Saraswati in 2020.

=== Miss International 2026 ===
On May 5, 2026, Victoria was announced as Indonesia's contestant for Miss International 2026, to be held in Tokyo, Japan.

== Advocacy and programs ==
Victoria initiated an arts preservation advocacy through her "KemBALIkeSENI" initiative. This initiative arose from her concern for the fate of traditional Balinese artists who are often overlooked behind the tourism industry. The program aims to create a collaborative space that brings together artists, galleries, arts institutions, and young people, through activities such as open studios, public discussions, and cross-sector collaborations. Substantively, the program focuses on increasing the visibility of Balinese artists, strengthening fair economic value for arts practitioners, and building collective awareness that the sustainability of Balinese culture rests on the community that actively preserves it.

== Discography ==
=== Album ===
Title	Album details
You Don't Know Me	Release: January 1, 2015; Label: Royal Prima Musikindo; Format: CD, streaming

Awards and achievements
Preceded by Melliza Xaviera (Jakarta SCR 1)	Miss International Indonesia; 2026	Succeeded by Incumbent
Preceded by Melliza Xaviera (Jakarta SCR 1)	Puteri Indonesia Lingkungan; 2026	Succeeded by Incumbent
Preceded by Natasya Amanda	Puteri Indonesia Bali; 2026	Succeeded by Incumbent
