= Oceanographic Institute =

Oceanographic Institute may refer to:

- Oceanographic Institute, Foundation Albert I, Prince of Monaco
- Oceanographic Institute of Paris
- Oceanographic Institute of Venezuela
- Harbor Branch Oceanographic Institute
- Nha Trang Oceanography Institute
- N.Z. Oceanographic Institute

== See also ==
- Institute of Oceanography (disambiguation)
- National Institute of Oceanography (disambiguation)
