= Salma Ranggita =

Indonesian beauty pageant titleholder

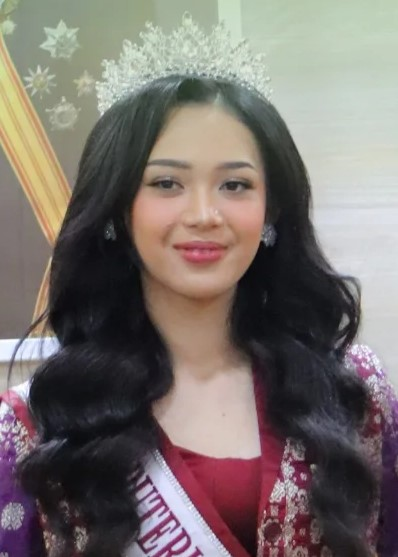
- Ranggita in 2025
- Born: Salma Ranggita Cahyariyani; Jakarta, Indonesia
- Education: University of Indonesia
- Beauty pageant titleholder
- Title: Puteri Indonesia Pariwisata 2025; Miss Cosmo Indonesia 2025
- Major competitions: Puteri Indonesia 2025; (2nd Runner-up – Puteri Indonesia Pariwisata 2025); Miss Cosmo 2025; (Top 21)

Salma Ranggita Cahyariyani is an Indonesian beauty pageant titleholder, who won Puteri Indonesia Pariwisata 2025 and represented Indonesia at Miss Cosmo 2025 where she finished in Top 21.

== Pageantry ==
=== Puteri Indonesia Sumatera Selatan 1 2025 ===
In 2025, Salma won Puteri Indonesia South Sumatra 1 2025, at Graha Mustika Ratu, Jakarta. This qualified her to represent the province of South Sumatra at Puteri Indonesia 2025.

=== Puteri Indonesia 2025 ===
Salma won Puteri Indonesia 2025, at the Plenary Hall, Jakarta International Convention Center in Central Jakarta on May 2, 2025, coinciding with National Education Day.

She was crowned by her predecessor Puteri Indonesia Pariwisata 2024 and Miss Cosmo 2024 Ketut Permata Juliastrid from Bali. In addition to winning the title, she also won the top three Motion Challenge award. During the competition, Salma advocated for the role of women in STEM for Golden Indonesia.

=== Miss Cosmo 2025 ===
She represented Indonesia at Miss Cosmo 2025 held in Vietnam, on December 20, 2025. At the conclusion of the event, she placed in the Top 21.

Awards and achievements
Preceded by Ketut Permata Juliastrid	Puteri Indonesia Pariwisata; 2025	Succeeded by Karina Moudy Widodo
Preceded by Ketut Permata Juliastrid	Miss Cosmo Indonesia; 2025	Succeeded by Karina Moudy Widodo]
