= National Institute of Oceanography =

National Institute of Oceanography may refer to:

- National Institute of Oceanography, India
- National Institute of Oceanography (Pakistan)
- National Institute of Oceanography (Great Britain): National Oceanography Centre
  - National Oceanography Centre, Southampton, one branch of the National Oceanography Centre
- Institute of Ocean Sciences, BC, Canada

== See also ==
- National Institute (disambiguation)
- Oceanography
- Oceanographic Institute (disambiguation)
