= Puteri Indonesia 2024 =

2024 Indonesian beauty pageant

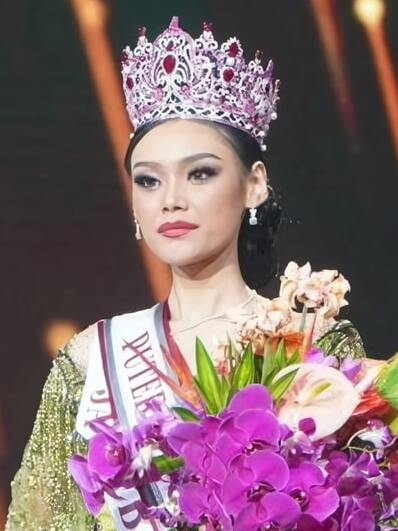
- Harashta Haifa Zahra
- Date: 8 March 2024
- Presenters: Choky Sitohang; Patricia Gouw
- Entertainment: Tiara Andini; Lesti; Baim; Adinda Cresheilla
- Theme: Nusantara: The Authentic Beauty of Indonesia
- Venue: Plenary Hall, Jakarta Convention Center, Jakarta, Indonesia
- Broadcaster: SCTV; Vidio
- Entrants: 42
- Placements: 16
- Withdrawals: North Kalimantan; North Maluku
- Winner: Harashta Haifa Zahra; West Java

Puteri Indonesia 2024, the 27th edition of the Puteri Indonesia pageant, was held on 8 March 2024 at the Plenary Hall, Jakarta Convention Center in Jakarta, Indonesia. Farhana Nariswari of West Java crowned her successor, Harashta Haifa Zahra of West Java, at the end of the event. This marked the first time a province won back-to-back titles in the pageant's history.

Puteri Indonesia Lingkungan 2023 Yasinta Aurellia of East Java, Puteri Indonesia Pariwisata 2023 Lulu Zaharani Krisna Widodo of Lampung, and third Runner-Up Dinda Nur Safira of Yogyakarta SR also crowned Sophie Kirana of Yogyakarta SR, Ketut Permata Juliastrid of Bali, and Melati Tedja of East Java as Puteri Indonesia Lingkungan 2024, Puteri Indonesia Pariwisata 2024, and Puteri Indonesia Pendidikan and Kebudayaan 2024, respectively.

With Harashta Haifa Zahra and Ketut Permata Juliastrid Sari winning Miss Supranational 2024 and Miss Cosmo 2024 respectively, this has become the most successful Puteri Indonesia batch to date.

== Background ==
Jakarta Convention Center (JCC), pageant venue

=== Location, date and broadcast ===
It was announced that the coronation night would again be held at the Plenary Hall, Jakarta Convention Center in Jakarta on 8 March–coinciding with International Women's Day. The Foundation has met with Maria F. Febryani as Creative Director for PT. Indonesia Entertainment Production (IEP), a subsidiary of the Indonesia Entertainment Group (IEG), indicated that SCTV was to be one of the media partners as well as a television network that has full broadcast rights to broadcast the final night live after consecutive four editions of the event.

=== Selection of participants ===
The first seven contestants were selected through regional competitions held in each organizing province. They were East Java, Bali, West Nusa Tenggara, West Kalimantan, East Kalimantan, North Sulawesi and South Sulawesi. The other 35 contestants were selected by a committee through central auditions held at Graha Mustika Ratu, the organization's headquarters in Jakarta. The selection was supplemented by one delegate per 15 provinces who had been determined their 'Puteri Indonesia Fevorit Daerah', subsequently chosen by viewers through a public vote on the official website. Four winners will have an additional '2' in their regional titles. The organization also provided a two-ticket opportunity for alumni who never reached the top three in previous years, but were eventually transferred for voting.

This edition marked the planned debut of five new provinces which were included in the Eastern Indonesia group due to expansion on 30 June 2022 based on Law No. 16 of 2022. They were the provinces of South Papua, Central Papua, Highland Papua, and Southwest Papua province. This plan was later not implemented because the organization admitted that the administration was not yet complete and the regional government was not ready to send their delegation. This increase in the number of contestants had been planned from the previous two editions, but was not implemented for the same reason. In addition, North Kalimantan did not have a representative this edition.

==== Withdrawals ====
The representatives of North Maluku and Banten 1, Ratnadila Muhammad Saleh Tuanan Al Faroeq and Giftia Wardani later withdrew due to personal and educational reasons, respectively. For Banten, Latisa Safa Maura was sole representative at this year's edition.

Fitria Helnawati, the representative of West Sumatra, withdrew halfway through the competition due to illness.

== Pageant ==
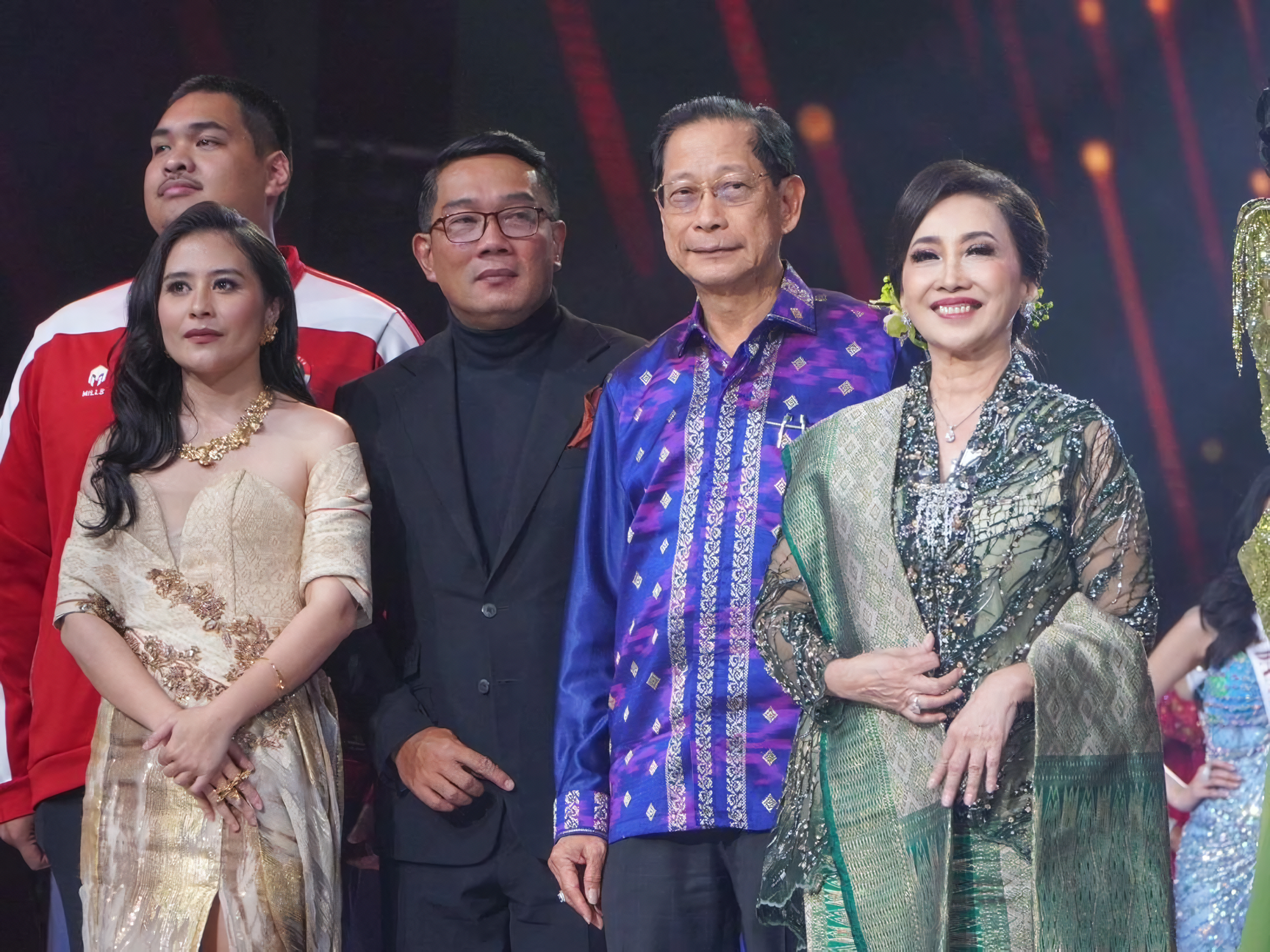
Five of the judges. From back, left to right; Dito Ariotedjo, Prilly Latuconsina, Ridwan Kamil, Jahja Setiaatmadja, and Putri Kus Wisnu Wardani.

=== Format ===
The Puteri Indonesia Foundation announced several changes to the format of the edition. The number of semifinalists increased by one to sixteen from the previous edition. The results of the preliminary competition held on 2 March 2024, which consisted of talent, traditional costume, evening gown competitions, and closed interviews, determined the first thirteen semi-finalists. Voting was used again in this edition to determine the fourteenth to sixteenth contestants who would advance to the final. Sixteen semifinalists competed in the speech judging, then narrowed down to five and added by one from a second voting. The six finalists then competed in a question and answer and speech competition in which four contestants were selected as finalists. The four finalists competed in the final question round, after which the winners of Puteri Indonesia, Puteri Indonesia Lingkungan, Puteri Indonesia Pariwisata and Puteri Indonesia Pendidikan & Kebudayaan were announced.

=== Selection committee ===
There were twelve selection committee members.

- Kusuma Dewi Sutanto – head of organization of Yayasan Puteri Indonesia, jury president
- Mega Angkasa – head of communications of Yayasan Puteri Indonesia, jury vice-president
- Kusuma Ida Anjani – director of Mustika Ratu, chairwoman of the Puteri Indonesia 2024 selection
- Laksmi De-Neefe Suardana – Puteri Indonesia 2022 from Bali
- Retno Marsudi – 17th minister of foreign affairs of Indonesia
- Dito Ariotedjo – 14th minister of youth and sports of Indonesia
- Ridwan Kamil – former 13th governor of West Java, development curator of Nusantara
- Emil Dardak – 5th vice-governor of East Java
- Prilly Latuconsina – Indonesian public figure, activist, and actress
- Jahja Setiaatmadja – president director of Bank Central Asia
- Andrea Aguilera – Miss Supranational 2023 from Ecuador
- Luma Russo – Miss Charm 2023 from Brazil

== Competitions ==
=== Pre-contest activities ===
==== The Most Photogenic ====
In this activity, all contestants had to go through a mandatory official photo shoot, then five delegates from The Most Photogenic were selected by Bubah Alfian and Albert Yanuar to take another special photo shoot by Denny Mirrorcle.

Result	Contestants	Ref.
Winner	West Papua – Annisa Banafaj Salsabila Dabeduku Thesia	
Top 5	Aceh – Suci Annisa Mawardi; Bangka Belitung – Joan Angelina; East Java – Melati Tedja; West Java – Harashta Haifa Zahra	

==== Catwalk Challenge ====
In this challenge, all contestants must show their skills on the catwalk through short videos. The theme for this 27th edition is "Fly Against The Wind". The best catwalk wins this challenge.

Result	Contestants	Ref.
Winners	Riau – Jeni Rahmadial Fitri; West Java – Harashta Haifa Zahra; East Nusa Tenggara 1 – Veronica Gabriela Margareth Asadoma	
Top 5	Jakarta SCR 5 – Putricia Adelianti; South Kalimantan – Emanuella Bungasmara Ega Tirta	

==== Make-Up Challenge ====
In this challenge, all contestants must show their make-up skills using Mustika Ratu cosmetic products through short videos. The best makeup wins this challenge.

Result	Contestants	Ref.
Winners	Aceh – Suci Annisa Mawardi; East Java – Melati Tedja; Bali – Ketut Permata Juliastrid Sari	

=== Talent Competition and Traditional Costume Show and Preliminary Competition ===
==== Best in Talent ====
Previously it was selected by a jury of the top ten best talents from the contestants' overall talent videos. The top ten have the opportunity to showcase their talents in the Talent Competition, which will then be further assessed and the top three nominees for Best Talent will be announced. The grand winner will be announced on coronation night.

Result	Contestants	Ref.
Winner	Jakarta SCR 5 – Putricia Adelianti	
Top 3	East Nusa Tenggara 2 – Putri Un Tanjung Malada; West Papua – Annisa Banafaj Salsabila Dabeduku Thesia	
Top 10	Aceh – Suci Annisa Mawardi; Riau – Jeni Rahmadial Fitri; West Java – Harashta Haifa Zahra; Yogyakarta SR – Sophie Kirana; East Kalimantan – Kori Aprilia; West Sulawesi – Andi Aisyah Mawar Hardy; Maluku – Novita Everdina Permatasari Pattipeilohy	

==== Best in Traditional Costume ====
All contestants displayed their traditional costumes in front of the jury during the Traditional Costume Show. At the end of the event the top three nominees for Best in Traditional Costume were announced. The grand winner will be announced on coronation night.

Result	Contestants	Ref.
Winner	East Java – Melati Tedja	
Top 3	North Sumatra – Nabiqah Anisa Salsabila Pasaribu; West Kalimantan 2 – Shindy Valensia	

==== Best in Evening Gown ====
All contestants presented their evening gowns in front of the jury during the Preliminary Competition. At the end of the event the top three and Best in Evening Gown winners were announced.

Result	Contestants	Ref.
Winner	Bali – Permata Juliastrid	
1st Runner-Up	West Sulawesi – Andi Aisyah Mawar Hardy	
2nd Runner-Up	West Kalimantan 2 – Shindy Valensia	

=== Best Profile Video ===
All contestants are required to make a profile video as a form of introducing themselves as contestants and the area they represent. The best profile video wins this award.

Result	Contestants	Ref.
Winners	East Nusa Tenggara 1 – Veronica Gabriela Margareth Asadoma; Central Kalimantan – Dessy Paramita Dewi; Maluku – Novita Everdina Permatasari Pattipeilohy	

=== Motion Challenge ===
All contestants are randomly divided into 21 groups in pairs. In this challenge, the host presents motions about different cases and issues for each group. Two delegates in one group state whether they agree or not with the statement and explain it for 1 minute.

Group
1	2	3	4	5	6	7
Jakarta SCR 1	South Kalimantan	East Kalimantan 1	West Papua	Lampung	Jakarta SCR 5	Yogyakarta SR
South Sumatra 1	West Sulawesi	Southeast Sulawesi	East Nusa Tenggara 1	Bengkulu	East Kalimantan 2	Central Sulawesi
Group
8	9	10	11	12	13	14
Central Kalimantan	Jakarta SCR 4	Papua	East Java	Bangka Belitung	East Nusa Tenggara 2	Aceh
Central Java 2	South Sumatra 2	Gorontalo	Maluku	West Java	Central Java 1	Jakarta SCR 6
Group
15	16	17	18	19	20	21
West Kalimantan 1	North Sumatra	Jakarta SCR 3	West Kalimantan 2	Riau Islands	South Sulawesi	Riau
North Sulawesi	Banten	Bali	Jambi	West Sumatra	West Nusa Tenggara	Jakarta SCR 2

== Results ==
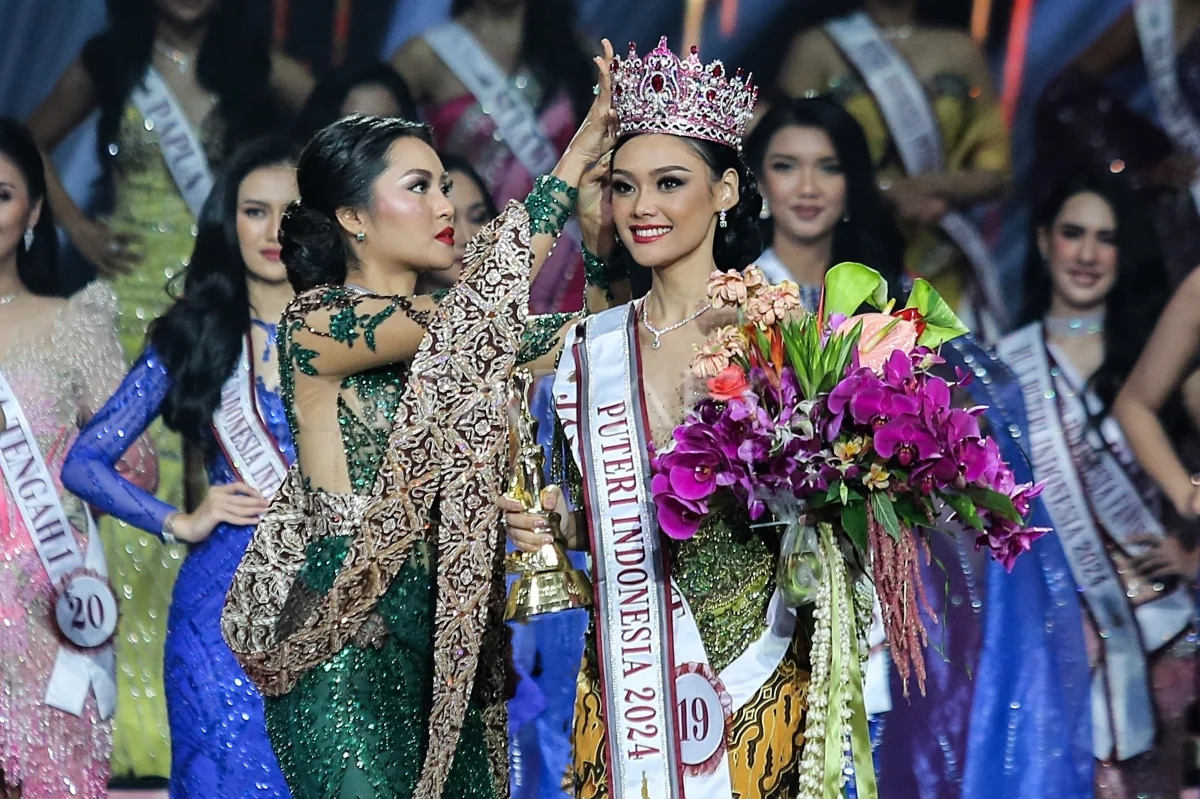
Harashta Haifa Zahra (right) was crowned the winner of Puteri Indonesia 2024 by her predecessor Farhana Nariswari (left)

=== Titleholders ===
Puteri Indonesia 2024
Puteri Indonesia Lingkungan 2024
Puteri Indonesia Pariwisata 2024
Puteri Indonesia Pendidikan & Kebudayaan 2024

Placement	Contestant	International Placement
Puteri Indonesia 2024 (Miss Supranational Indonesia 2024)	West Java – Harashta Haifa Zahra	Winner — Miss Supranational 2024
Puteri Indonesia Lingkungan 2024 (Miss International Indonesia 2024)	Yogyakarta SR – Sophie Kirana	4th Runner-Up — Miss International 2024
Puteri Indonesia Pariwisata 2024 (Miss Cosmo Indonesia 2024)	Bali – Ketut Permata Juliastrid Sari	Winner — Miss Cosmo 2024
Puteri Indonesia Pendidikan & Kebudayaan 2024 (Miss Charm Indonesia 2024)	East Java – Melati Tedja	Top 6 — Miss Charm 2024
Top 6	4th Runner-up Jakarta SCR 1 – Ghina Raihanah; 5th Runner-up Banten – Latisa Safa Maura § Δ	Did not compete
Top 16	Aceh – Suci Annisa Mawardi; North Sumatra – Nabiqah Anisa Salsabila Pasaribu §; Bangka Belitung – Joan Angelina; Jambi – Miracle Sitompul; Jakarta SCR 3 – Larissa Amelinda Soeryana; East Nusa Tenggara 1 – Veronica Gabriela Margareth Asadoma; West Kalimantan 2 – Shindy Valensia; South Sulawesi – Chelsea Beatrix Putri Raimel; Maluku – Novita Everdina Permatasari Pattipeilohy §; West Papua – Annisa Banafaj Salsabila Dabeduku Thesia	Did not compete

Δ – Qualified for the Top 6 through voting
§ – Qualified for the Top 16 through voting

=== Special awards ===
Awards	Contestants
Main Awards
Puteri Indonesia Persahabatan (Miss Congeniality)	West Papua – Annisa Banafaj Salsabila Dabeduku Thesia
Puteri Indonesia Favorit (Miss Favorite)	Banten – Latisa Safa Maura
Puteri Fotogenik (Miss Photogenic)	West Papua – Annisa Banafaj Salsabila Dabeduku Thesia
Kostum Tradisional Terbaik (Best in Traditional Costume)	East Java – Melati Tedja
Gaun Malam Terbaik (Best in Evening Gown)	(gold) Bali – Ketut Permata Juliastrid Sari; (silver) West Sulawesi – Andi Aisyah Mawar Hardy; (bronze) West Kalimantan 2 – Shindy Valensia
Puteri Indonesia Berbakat (Miss Talent)	Jakarta SCR 5 – Putricia Adelianti
Puteri Indonesia Intelegensia (Miss Intelligence)	(gold) Jakarta SCR 2 – Lady Diandra Karsodinomo Pattiata; (silver) Maluku – Novita Everdina Permatasari Pattipeilohy; (bronze) Jambi – Miracle Sitompul
Puteri Indonesia Influencer (Miss Influencer)	Bengkulu – Nabilah Putri Bintadytama
Sponsor's Award
Sajani Awards by OPPAL	East Java – Melati Tedja

== Contestants ==
All 42 official delegates have been selected:

Province	Delegate	Age (Note: Ages at the time of the pageant.)	Hometown
Sumatra
Aceh	Suci Annisa Mawardi	24	Subulussalam
North Sumatra	Nabiqah Anisa Salsabila Pasaribu	20	Sibolga
West Sumatra	Fitria Helnawati	23	Padang Pariaman
Riau	Jeni Rahmadial Fitri	26	Bengkalis
Riau Islands	Raja Azizah Purnandari	23	Tanjungpinang
Jambi	Miracle Sitompul	24	West Tanjung Jabung
South Sumatra 1	Ananda Papat Oktariza Yacoub	24	Palembang
South Sumatra 2	Eni Permona Jasen	23	East Ogan Komering Ulu
Bangka Belitung	Joan Angelina	22	Pangkalpinang
Bengkulu	Nabilah Putri Bintadytama	22	Seluma
Lampung	Nabilah Rohma Balqis	24	Bandarlampung
Java
Jakarta SCR 1	Ghina Raihanah Tadjoedin	22	Jakarta
Jakarta SCR 2	Lady Diandra Karsodinomo Pattiata	25	Jakarta
Jakarta SCR 3	Larissa Amelinda Soeryana	24	Jakarta
Jakarta SCR 4	Alyssa Rosvita Tarigan	23	Jakarta
Jakarta SCR 5	Putricia Adelianti	20	Jakarta
Jakarta SCR 6	Vanessa Zahra Sesa	25	Jakarta
Banten	Latisa Safa Maura	25	Tangerang
West Java	Harashta Haifa Zahra	20	Garut
Central Java 1	Kanya Puruhita Amarilis	26	Sukoharjo
Central Java 2	Ade Kania Pramesty	24	Semarang
Yogyakarta SR	Sophie Kirana	23	Sleman
East Java	Melati Tedja	24	Surabaya
Lesser Sunda Islands
Bali	Ketut Permata Juliastrid Sari	20	Denpasar
West Nusa Tenggara	Ni Nyoman Putri Ayu Diana	23	Mataram
East Nusa Tenggara 1	Veronica Gabriela Margareth Asadoma	25	Alor
East Nusa Tenggara 2	Putri Un Tanjung Malada	23	Rote Ndao
Kalimantan
West Kalimantan 1	Ferisa Dhea Nurramadhani Putri	23	North Kayong
West Kalimantan 2	Shindy Valensia	23	Sambas
Central Kalimantan	Dessy Paramita Dewi	23	Palangka Raya
South Kalimantan	Emanuella Bungasmara Ega Tirta	24	Banjarmasin
East Kalimantan 1	Kori Aprilia	25	West Kutai
East Kalimantan 2	Triana Megawati Tening	25	Mahakam Ulu
Sulawesi
South Sulawesi	Chelsea Beatrix Putri Raimel	26	Tana Toraja
West Sulawesi	Andi Aisyah Mawar Hardy	22	Mamuju
Southeast Sulawesi	Dinda Bestari	23	South Konawe
Central Sulawesi	Putri Amalia Moidady	20	Sea Banggai
North Sulawesi	Annisa Oktavia Rettob	26	Manado
Gorontalo	Hindun Clarista Hulopi	21	Bone Bolango
Eastern Indonesia
Maluku	Novita Everdina Permatasari Pattipeilohy	24	Central Moluccas
West Papua	Annisa Banafaj Salsabilla Dabeduku Thesia	22	South Sorong
Papua	Rini Anjarwati Kusuma Putri	20	Merauke
