= Sophie Kirana =

Indonesian beauty pageant titleholder

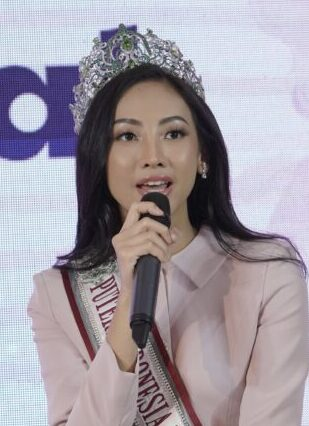
- Kirana in 2024
- Born: Sophie Kirana; August 5, 2000 (age 26); Yogyakarta, Special Region of Yogyakarta, Indonesia
- Education: Gadjah Mada University (BEc)
- Height: 1.72 m (5 ft 8 in)
- Beauty pageant titleholder
- Title: Puteri Indonesia Lingkungan 2024; Miss International Indonesia 2024
- Major competitions: Puteri Indonesia 2024; (1st Runner-up – Puteri Indonesia Lingkungan); Miss International 2024; (4th Runner-up)

Sophie Kirana (Javanese: ꦱꦺꦴꦦꦶꦏꦶꦫꦤ; born August 5, 2000) is an Indonesian beauty pageant titleholder who won Puteri Indonesia Lingkungan 2024. She represented Indonesia at Miss International 2024 held in Tokyo, Japan, and was the fourth runner-up.

== Background and education ==
Sophie Kirana was born in Yogyakarta, Special Region of Yogyakarta, Indonesia. Her parents are Priyadi Sutarso and Dyah Kurniati. She grew up in Yogyakarta, Surakarta, and Jakarta. Kirana has completed her high school education from Labschool Jakarta High School from 2015 to 2018. In 2020, she received a Bachelor of Economics honours degree in Business and Management from the Gadjah Mada University in Sleman.

== Pageantry ==
=== Puteri Yogyakarta 2024 ===
In 2024, Kirana auditioned for the provincial selection of participants for Puteri Indonesia Yogyakarta 2024 for the election event Puteri Indonesia 2024 in Graha Mustika Ratu in Jakarta, where she was successfully selected as the winner of the selection.

=== Puteri Indonesia 2024 ===
Kirana represented the province of Yogyakarta SR at Puteri Indonesia 2024 held at the Plenary Hall, Jakarta Convention Center in Central Jakarta on March 8, 2024, which coincided with International Women's Day.

At the end of the event, Kirana was the second winner with the title Puteri Indonesia Lingkungan 2024, and was crowned by her predecessor Puteri Indonesia Lingkungan 2023, Yasinta Aurellia from East Java. Kirana is the second Yogyakarta representative who has won the title of Puteri Indonesia Lingkungan, last achieved by Reisa Kartikasari in Puteri Indonesia 2010.

=== Miss International 2024 ===
In 2024, the Puteri Indonesia Foundation implemented a direct appointment and selection system for all Puteri Indonesia winners to compete in international pageants. The foundation selected Kirana to represent Indonesia at Miss International 2024 was held on November 12, 2024, in Tokyo and finished as fourth runner-up.

Awards and achievements
Preceded by Vanessa Hayes, Bolivia	Miss International 4th Runner-Up; 2024	Succeeded by Myrna Esguerra, Philippines
Preceded by Dinda Nur Safira; Bianca Havika	Puteri Indonesia Yogyakarta; 2024	Succeeded by Maharani Divaningtyas
Preceded by Yasinta Aurellia (East Java)	Puteri Indonesia Lingkungan; 2024	Succeeded by Melliza Xaviera (Jakarta SCR 1)
Preceded by Farhana Nariswari (West Java 1)	Miss International Indonesia; 2024	Succeeded by Melliza Xaviera (Jakarta SCR 1)
