= National Institute of Technology (Indonesia) =

Coordinates: 6.879815°S 107.625939°E

- Institut Teknologi Nasional Bandung
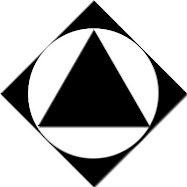
- Logo of Institut Teknologi Nasional
- Type: Private university
- Established: December 14, 1972
- Rector: Prof. Meilinda Nurbanasari, Ph.D
- Location: Jalan PHH. Mustafa No. 23, Bandung, Bandung, West Java, Indonesia
- Nickname: ITENAS
- Website: www.itenas.ac.id

The National Institute of Technology (Indonesian: Institut Teknologi Nasional, abbreviated as ITENAS), is a private, technology-oriented university located in Bandung, Indonesia.

ITENAS was established in 1972 as the National Academy of Technology (Indonesian: Akademi Teknologi Nasional, abbreviated as ATENAS) by the Dayang Sumbi Educational Foundation with R. Mansoer Wiratmadja as its first rector. ATENAS originally had four faculties, which focused on Architecture, Civil Engineering, Electrical Engineering, and Mechanical Engineering, respectively.

ATENAS was renamed the National Institute of Technology (NIT) in 1984, which currently has three faculties, namely the faculties of industrial technology, civil engineering, planning, and art and design.
