= Mooryati Soedibyo =

Indonesian politician and businessperson (1928–2024)

Bendara Raden Ayu Mooryati Soedibyo
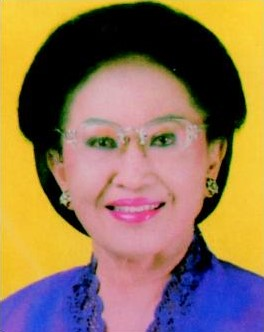
- Official portrait, 2004

Deputy Speaker of the People's Consultative Assembly
- In office 1 October 2004 – 1 October 2009
- President: Megawati Soekarnoputri; Susilo Bambang Yudhoyono
- Speaker: Hidayat Nur Wahid

Personal details
- Born: 5 January 1928 Surakarta, Dutch East Indies
- Died: 24 April 2024 (aged 96) Jakarta, Indonesia
- Spouse: K.R.M.H. Soedibyo Purbo Hadiningrat (m. 1956–1998)
- Children: 5, including Putri Kuswisnu Wardani
- Parents: K.R.M.T.H. Poernomo Hadiningrat (father); G.R.Aj. Kussalbiyah/G.R.Ay. Poernomo Hadiningrat (mother)
- Education: Saraswati University; Indonesia Open University; Sebelas Maret University; University of Indonesia
- Occupation: Director of Puteri Indonesia; politician; businessperson

BRA Mooryati Soedibyo (5 January 1928 – 24 April 2024) was an Indonesian politician and businessperson who was a member of the Surakarta Sunanate royal family. She was the president director of Mustika Ratu, Deputy Speaker of the People's Consultative Assembly from 2004–2009, and the national director for Puteri Indonesia, which sends contestants to Miss Supranational, Miss International, Miss Cosmo, Miss Charm. In 2007, she was also ranked number seven on the list of the 99 most influential women in Indonesia by the Globe Asia magazine. Mooryati Soedibyo was recorded by the Indonesian World Records Museum as the winner of the oldest doctorate in Indonesia, and as "Empu Jamu".

== Personal life ==
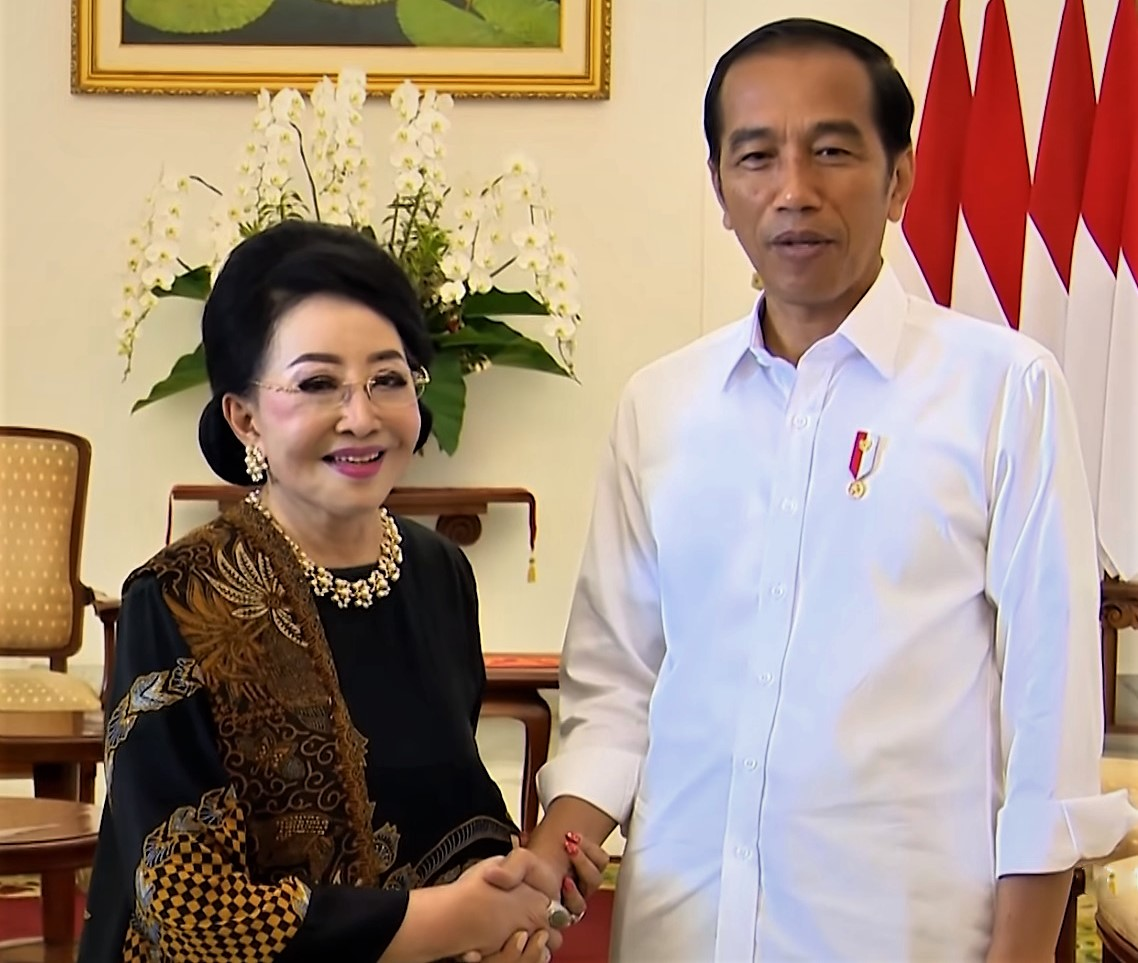
Soedibyo (left) with President Joko Widodo (right) at Bogor Presidential Palace, March 2019.

A member of a Javanese royal family, she was born in Surakarta, Central Java and grew up in the palace of Surakarta Sunanate. She learned about herbal medicine and traditional Javanese cosmetics from her grandmother; the traditional knowledge preserved by the royal family is considered to be superior to that known by the common people. Soedibyo received a bachelor's degree in English literature from the Indonesia Open University, a master's degree in English literature from the Sebelas Maret University and a PhD in strategic management from the School of Economics at the University of Indonesia. In 1956, she married Soedibyo Purbo Hadiningrat.

The granddaughter of Pakubuwana X, she received a traditional education at the palace that emphasised manners, classical dance, karawitan, batik, knowing nutritious plants, concocting herbs, and traditional cosmetics from natural ingredients, Javanese literary language, traditional songs, Kawi script, and other arts.

Soedibyo founded the cosmetics company Mustika Ratu in 1975. The company also operates its own spa resorts. In 2002, she was named Entrepreneur of the Year by Ernst & Young Indonesia.

Soedibyo served as a member of the Regional Representative Council and as a member and vice chairperson of the People's Consultative Assembly.

In 1990, Soedibyo acquired the licence for the Puteri Indonesia beauty pageant and established herself as the national director.

In 2016, she published an autobiography Menerobos Tradisi Memasuki Dunia Baru, The Untold Story.

Soedibyo died on 24 April 2024, at the age of 96.
