= National Institute =

National Institute may refer to:

- National Institute on Aging, United States (U.S.)
- National Institute of Food and Agriculture, U.S.
- National Institute of Mental Health, U.S.
- Belgranian National Institute, Argentina
- San Martín National Institute, Argentina
- Instituto Nacional, Chile
- Homi Bhabha National Institute, India
- Tyndall National Institute, Ireland
- Barber National Institute, U.S.
