= Putri Kus Wisnu Wardani =

Indonesian politician and businesswoman

Raden Ayu Putri Kus Wisnu Wardani
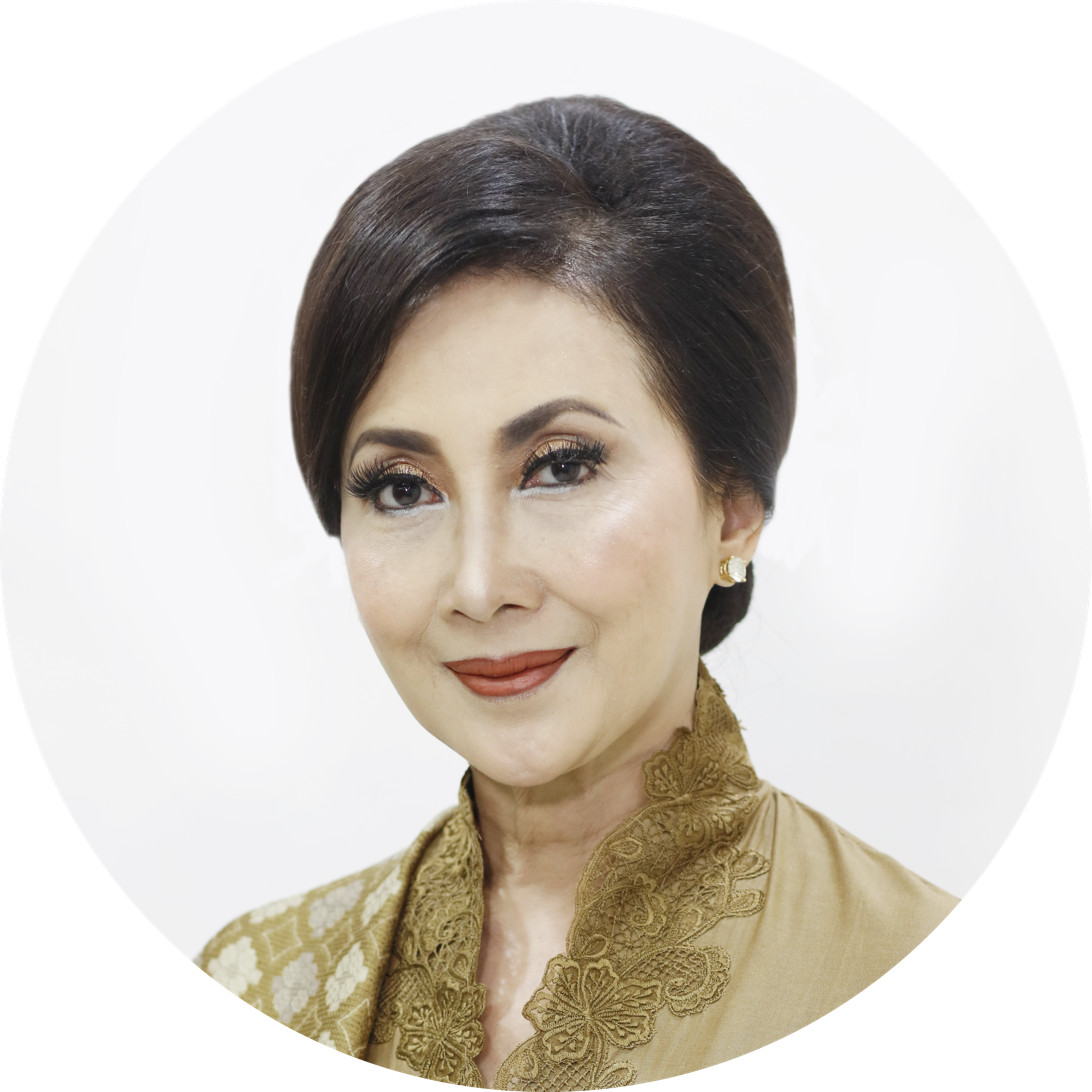
- Putri Kus Wisnu Wardani as Member of Indonesian Presidential Advisory Council 2019-2024

Member of Indonesian Presidential Advisory Council
- In office December 19, 2019 – October 20, 2024
- President: Joko Widodo
- Chairman: Wiranto

Personal details
- Born: Raden Ajeng Putri Kus Wisnu Wardani; 20 September 1959 (age 67) Jakarta, Indonesia
- Parents: Soedibyo Purbo Hadiningrat (father); Mooryati Soedibyo (mother)
- Relatives: Pakubuwana X (great-grandfather)
- Education: Master of Business Administration (M.B.A.)
- Alma mater: National University California
- Occupation: Businesswoman; politician

Raden Ayu Putri Kus Wisnu Wardani (born September 20, 1959) is a member of the Presidential Advisory Council since 2019–2024 and an Indonesian businesswoman. Putri was included in the list of Asia's Most Influential Indonesia by Tatler in 2021. In 2011–2020, she received the leadership baton from her mother Mooryati Soedibyo, who is the founder and pioneer of Mustika Ratu. Since 2005, Putri has been one of the top officials at the Indonesia's oldest national beauty pageant Puteri Indonesia, with the position of Chair of the Advisory and advisory board for Yayasan Puteri Indonesia.

== Early life and education ==
Putri was born into a noble family from the Surakarta Hadiningrat Sunanate in Central Java and has the Javanese nobility title Raden Ajeng (RA), her surname is Hadiningrat. Putri was born in Jakarta to her mother Bendara Raden Ayu (BRAy.) Mooryati Soedibyo who was the granddaughter of King Pakubuwono X through one of his concubines Raden Ajeng (RA) Trenggonoroekmi. Her father Kanjeng Raden Mas Harya (KRMH) Soedibyo Poerbo Hadiningrat was an engineer and former government employee in the industrial sector. Her maternal grandfather, Kanjeng Raden Mas Tumenggung Harya (KRMTH) Poernomo Hadiningrat was a former Regent of Brebes for the 1920–1929 period and a cousin of Raden Ayu (R.Ay) Kartini.

In 1988, Putri began her business education by studying at National University, California, in Inglewood, California, United States to obtain a master's degree. In 1990, she successfully graduated from university with a Master of Business Administration (MBA) degree. In January 2024, Putri was specially awarded the honorary degree of Doctor Honoris Causa (Dr. (HC)) from the University of Cambodia in Phnom Penh, Cambodia thanks to her performance in the field of leadership.

== Filmography ==
Year	Title	Role	Production	Director
2018	Sultan Agung: Tahta, Perjuangan, Cinta	Producer	Mooryati Soedibyo Cinema	Hanung Bramantyo

== Awards and nominations ==
Year	Award	Category	Nomination	Result
2018	Bandung Film Festival	Praiseworthy Film	Sultan Agung: Tahta, Perjuangan, Cinta (as receiver)	Won
2018	Indonesian Film Festival	Best Long Story Film	Sultan Agung: Tahta, Perjuangan, Cinta (as receiver)	Nominated
2018	Piala Maya	Long Story Film/Selected Cinema Films	Sultan Agung: Tahta, Perjuangan, Cinta (as receiver)	Nominated
2019	Indonesian Movie Actors Awards	Favorite Movie	Sultan Agung: Tahta, Perjuangan, Cinta (as receiver)	Nominated
2019	Indonesian Movie Actors Awards	Best Ansambel	Sultan Agung: Tahta, Perjuangan, Cinta (as receiver)	Nominated

=== Other awards ===
In 2021, Putri received an award and recognition as Asia's Most Influential Indonesia given by the fashion magazine site, Tatler Asia. This award is given to figures in Indonesia who have a big influence on the fashion and beauty industry.
