= Mustika Ratu =

Indonesian cosmetics and herbal company

PT Mustika Ratu Tbk
- Native name: ꦩꦸꦱ꧀ꦠꦶꦏꦫꦠꦸ
- Type: Public company
- Traded as: IDX: MRAT
- Industry: Cosmetic and beauty
- Founded: 14 March 1978; 48 years ago
- Founder: Mooryati Soedibyo
- Headquarters: Jakarta, Indonesia
- Area served: Indonesia
- Key people: Bingar Egidius Situmorang (chief executive officer); Djoko Ramiadji (Commissioner)
- Products: Cosmetic; jamu; Self-care
- Brands: Beauty Queen; Moor's; Mustika Puteri; Bask; Ratumas; Biocell; Taman Sari; Jejamu; M Club; Herbamuno+; Brightening Bengkoang Series; Zaitun
- Revenue: 326,795 billion Rp (2021)
- Net income: 777 million Rp (2021)
- Total assets: 578,261 billion Rp (2021)
- Total equity: 343,196 billion Rp (2021)
- Owner: PT Mustika Ratu Investama (71.26%); Faadhil Irshad Nasution (5%)
- Number of employees: 1,410 (2021)
- Subsidiaries: PT Mustika Ratubuana International; Mustika Ratu (M) Sdn. Bhd; PT Mustika International Laboratories; PT Paras Cantik Kenanga; PT Mustika Ratu Entertainment
- Website: www.mustika-ratu.co.id

PT Mustika Ratu Tbk (Hanacaraka: ꦩꦸꦱ꧀ꦠꦶꦏꦫꦠꦸ) is a manufacturer of cosmetics and herbal medicine from Indonesia which is headquartered in South Jakarta. To support its business activities, the company has a factory in Ciracas.

== History ==
The company began its history in 1975 when Mooryati Soedibyo opened a cosmetics and herbal medicine business in her garage. On March 14, 1978, the company was officially founded. On April 8, 1981, the company began operating a factory in Ciracas, East Jakarta. In 1995, the company was officially listed on the Indonesia Stock Exchange. In 1996, the company was successfully certified ISO 14001 and ISO 9002. In 2000, the company expanded its product distribution and spa franchise to countries in Southeast Asia and the Middle East. In 2018, the company expanded its product distribution to Canada, United States, China, Iraq, New Zealand, and Bulgaria. In 2021, the company divided its business into two divisions, namely Beauty & Body Care and herbal medicine & health care. In May 2022, the company appointed Mawar de Jongh as the brand ambassador for the Brightening Bengkoang Series.

== Unit ==
- Mustika Ratu Buana Internasional
- Taman Sari Royal Heritage Spa
- Mooryati Soedibyo Institute of Education and training (Indonesian: Lembaga Pendidikan dan Pelatihan Mooryati Soedibyo) (LPPMS)
- Mustika Ratu Entertainment
