= Wilda Octaviana =

Indonesian model, actress and Miss Supranational Indonesia 2018

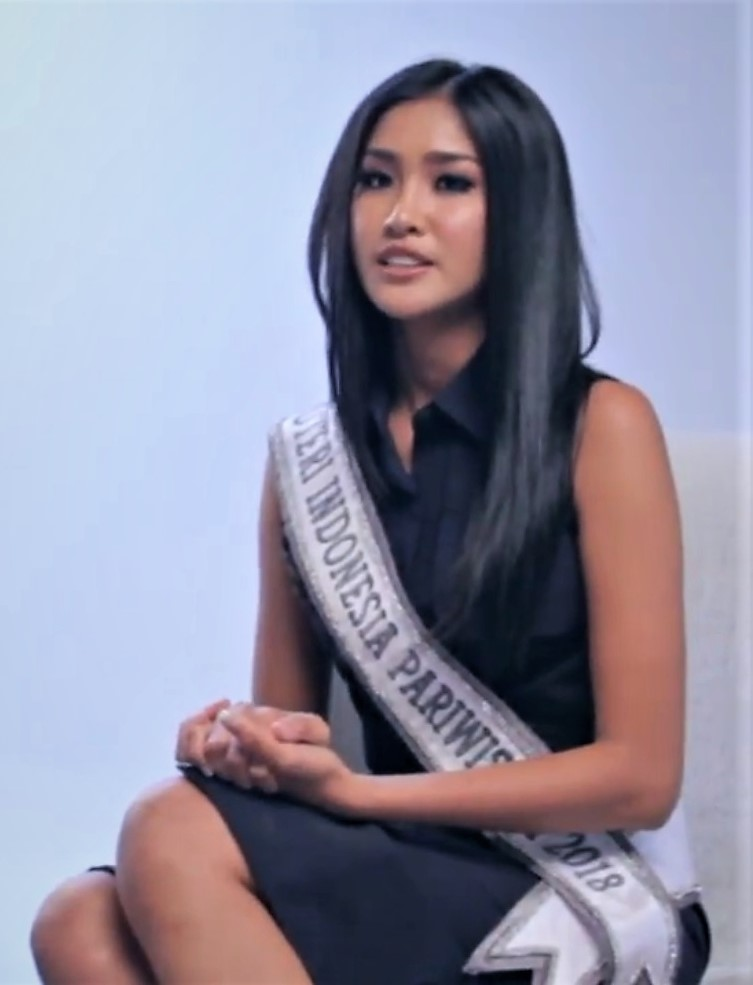
- Octaviana talks about Lombok in 2018
- Born: Wilda Octaviana Situngkir; October 27, 1995 (age 30); Jakarta, Indonesia
- Education: Panca Bhakti University; PPM School of Management
- Occupations: Indonesian Child Protection Commission Ambassador; Indonesian National Agency of Drug and Food Control Ambassador; Actress; TV Presenter; Model; Beauty pageant titleholder
- Height: 1.76 m (5 ft 9 in)
- Beauty pageant titleholder
- Title: Puteri Indonesia Kalimantan Barat 2018; Puteri Indonesia Pariwisata 2018; Miss Supranational Indonesia 2018
- Hair color: Black
- Eye color: Black
- Major competitions: Miss Earth Indonesia 2017; (Unplaced); Puteri Indonesia Kalimantan Barat 2018; (Winner); Puteri Indonesia 2018; (2nd Runner-up – Puteri Indonesia Pariwisata); Miss Supranational 2018; (3rd Runner-up)

Wilda Octaviana Situngkir (born October 27, 1995) also popularly known as Wilda Octaviana is an Indonesian Child Protection Commission Ambassador, Indonesian National Agency of Drug and Food Control Ambassador, actress and model who won the title of Puteri Indonesia Pariwisata 2018. She represented Indonesia at the Miss Supranational 2018 pageant, where she placed as the 3rd runner-up, repeating the same achievement by Cokorda Istri Krisnanda Widani in Miss Supranational 2013, Wilda became the fifth Indonesian to be placed as a finalist in Miss Supranational history, continuing the 4th year placement streaks of Indonesia, consecutively since Gresya Amanda Maaliwuga in 2015, Intan Aletrinö in 2016 and Karina Nadila Niab in 2017.

== Early life and education ==
Wilda was born in Jakarta – Indonesia, in a traditional Dayak mixed Batak tribe, then she moved to her father's hometown in Pontianak, West Kalimantan. She holds a bachelor's degree in Science in Agriculture from Universitas Panca Bhakti, Pontianak, West Kalimantan, Indonesia. She is currently finishing her Master degree in Business management from PPM School of Management.

On 11 March 2019, Wilda was elected as the Indonesian Child Protection Commission Ambassador by the Minister Dr. Susanto, MA and People's Representative Council. On 25 November 2019, Wilda was elected as the Ambassador of the National Agency of Drug and Food Control of The Republic of Indonesia by the Minister Penny Kusumastuti Lukito.

== Pageantry ==
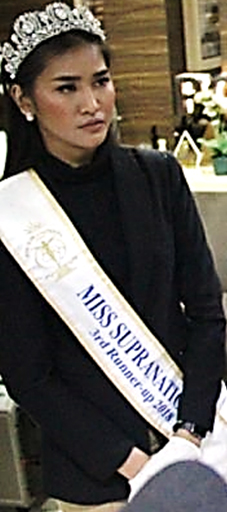
Wilda as 3rd Runner-up of Miss Supranational 2018.

=== Miss Earth Indonesia 2017 and Puteri West Kalimantan 2018 ===
Before competing in Puteri Indonesia 2018, Wilda competed in Miss Earth Indonesia 2017, where she won "Miss Photogenic" special award. In 2018, Wilda competed in the regional pageant of Puteri West Kalimantan 2018, winning the title to represent her province West Kalimantan in Puteri Indonesia 2018.

=== Puteri Indonesia 2018 ===
Wilda represented the West Kalimantan province at Puteri Indonesia 2018. At the end of the event, Wilda was crowned Puteri Indonesia Pariwisata 2018 at the finals held at the Jakarta Convention Center, Jakarta, on March 9, 2018, by the outgoing titleholder of Puteri Indonesia Pariwisata 2017, Karina Nadila Niab of East Nusa Tenggara.

The finale coronation night of Puteri Indonesia 2018 was attended by the reigning Miss Supranational 2017 – Jenny Kim of Korea as a main Guest-star. Wilda was crowned together with Sonia Fergina Citra as Puteri Indonesia 2018 and Vania Fitryanti Herlambang as Puteri Indonesia Lingkungan 2018. They appeared on the magazine cover of Tatler Indonesia together with Mooryati Soedibyo.

=== Miss Supranational 2018 ===
As Puteri Indonesia Pariwisata 2018, Wilda represented Indonesia at the 10th edition of Miss Supranational 2018 pageant in Hala MOSiR Arena, Krynica-Zdrój, Poland. The finale coronation night of the pageant was held on December 7, 2019, Wilda competed with the other 72 countries, where she ended-up crowned as the "3rd runner-up" of Miss Supranational 2018.

Beside of that, she also managed to won several awards from winning "Best National Costume", "Miss Supramodel Asia", "Miss Popularity" and "Miss Global Beauties Choice". Her national costume designed by the Jember Fashion Carnaval, bringing the Indonesian thanksgiving costume named The Sacred Hudoq which is inspired from a Dayak folk legend.

== Filmography ==
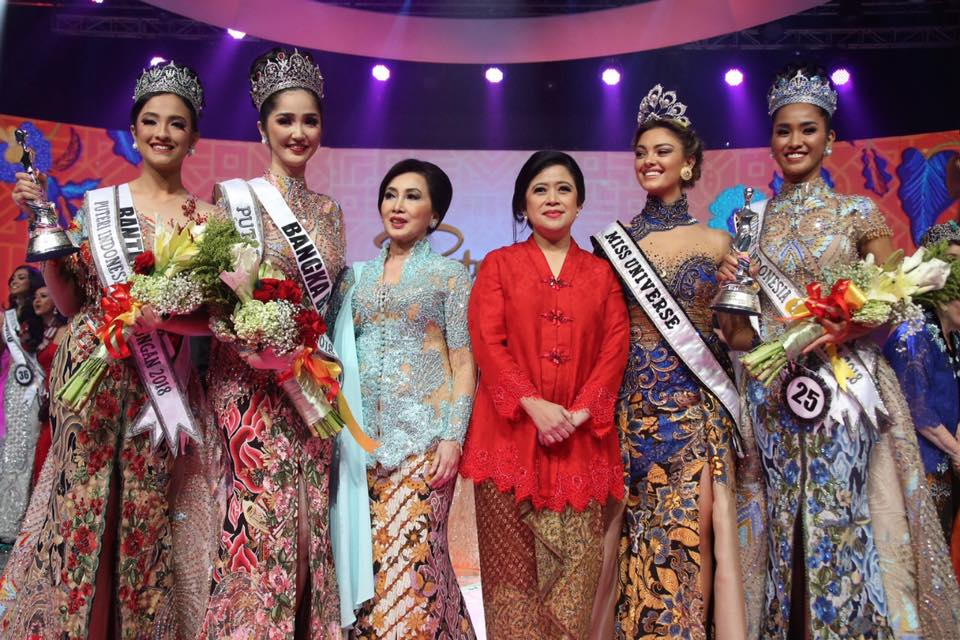
Wilda (right) together with Puteri Indonesia 2018-Sonia Fergina Citra, Puteri Indonesia Lingkungan 2018-Vania Fitryanti Herlambang, Miss Universe 2017-Demi-Leigh Nel-Peters, Puan Maharani and Puteri Indonesia Chairman Putri Kuswisnuwardhani.

Wilda has acted on several television films and cinema films. Since 2022, she also hosted some TV programmes.

=== Movies ===
Year	Title	Genre	Role	Film Production	Ref.
2020	Sisingamangaraja	Historical drama	Situngkir	Rapi Films	
2021	Memedi	Horror	Wilda	Vinci Studios	

=== Television films ===
Year	Title	Genre	Role	Film Production	Broadcaster	Ref.
2022	Dilema	Drama-romance	Tika	SinemArt	SCTV, Vidio	
2023	Open BO	Drama-romance	Husna	SinemArt	SCTV, Vidio	

=== Television programmes ===
Year	Title	Genre	Role	TV Production	Ref.
2019–2020	Puteri Indonesia	Beauty pageant	Backstage host	SCTV (TV network)	
2021–present	Showbiz News	Entertainment news	Host	Metro TV (Indonesian TV network)	
2023	The Bachelor Indonesia	Reality show	Herself	Fremantle Indonesia	

== See also ==
- Puteri Indonesia 2018
- Miss Supranational 2018
- Sonia Fergina Citra
- Vania Fitryanti Herlambang

Awards and achievements
Preceded by Pingkan Rilly Yunita	Puteri West Kalimantan; 2018	Succeeded by Karina Syahna
Preceded by Karina Nadila (East Nusa Tenggara)	Puteri Indonesia Pariwisata; 2018	Succeeded by Jesica Fitriana (West Java)
Preceded by (Ethiopia) Bitaniya Yosef	Miss Supranational 3rd Runner-Up; 2018	Succeeded by (Peru) Janick Maceta del Castillo
Preceded by New Title	Reina Hispanoamericana Indonesia; 2022	Succeeded by Incumbent
