= Vania Fitryanti =

Indonesian model, TV presenter and Miss International Indonesia 2018

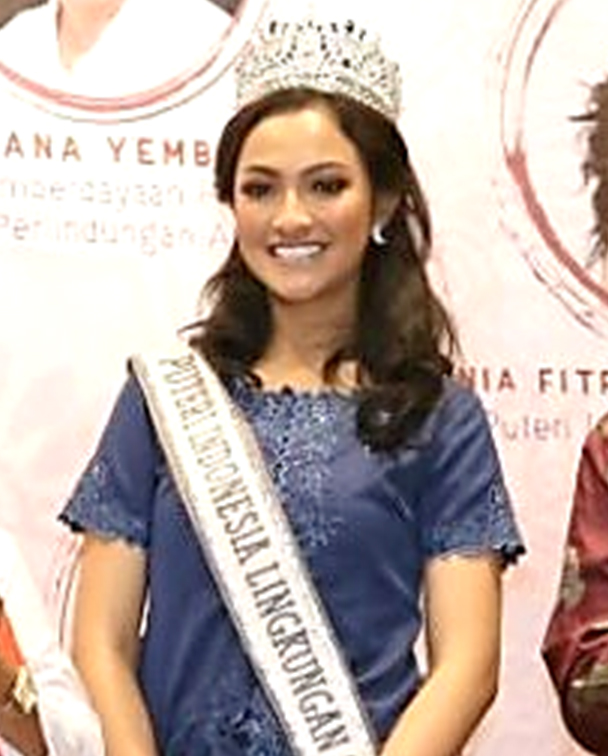
- Vania Fitryanti Herlambang as a speaker on Ministry of Women Empowerment and Child Protection of the Republic of Indonesia seminar in 2018
- Born: Vania Fitryanti Herlambang; February 11, 1997 (age 29); Tangerang, Banten, Indonesia
- Education: Bandung Institute of Technology
- Occupations: TV Presenter; project engineer; fashion model
- Height: 1.72 m (5 ft 7 1/2 in)
- Beauty pageant titleholder
- Title: Puteri Indonesia Banten 2018; Puteri Indonesia Lingkungan 2018; Miss International Indonesia 2018
- Hair color: Black
- Eye color: Brown
- Major competitions: Puteri Indonesia Banten 2018; (Winner); Puteri Indonesia 2018; (1st Runner-up – Puteri Indonesia Lingkungan 2018); Miss International 2018; (Top 15)

Vania Fitryanti Herlambang (born February 11, 1997) is an Indonesian TV host, engineer, fashion model and beauty pageant titleholder who won the title of Puteri Indonesia Lingkungan 2018. She represented Indonesia at the Miss International 2018 pageant in Japan, where she placed as the Top 15 semi-finalist, continuing the ongoing 3rd year placement streaks of Indonesia, consecutively since Felicia Hwang Yi Xin in 2016 and Kevin Lilliana Junaedy in 2017.

== Early life and education ==
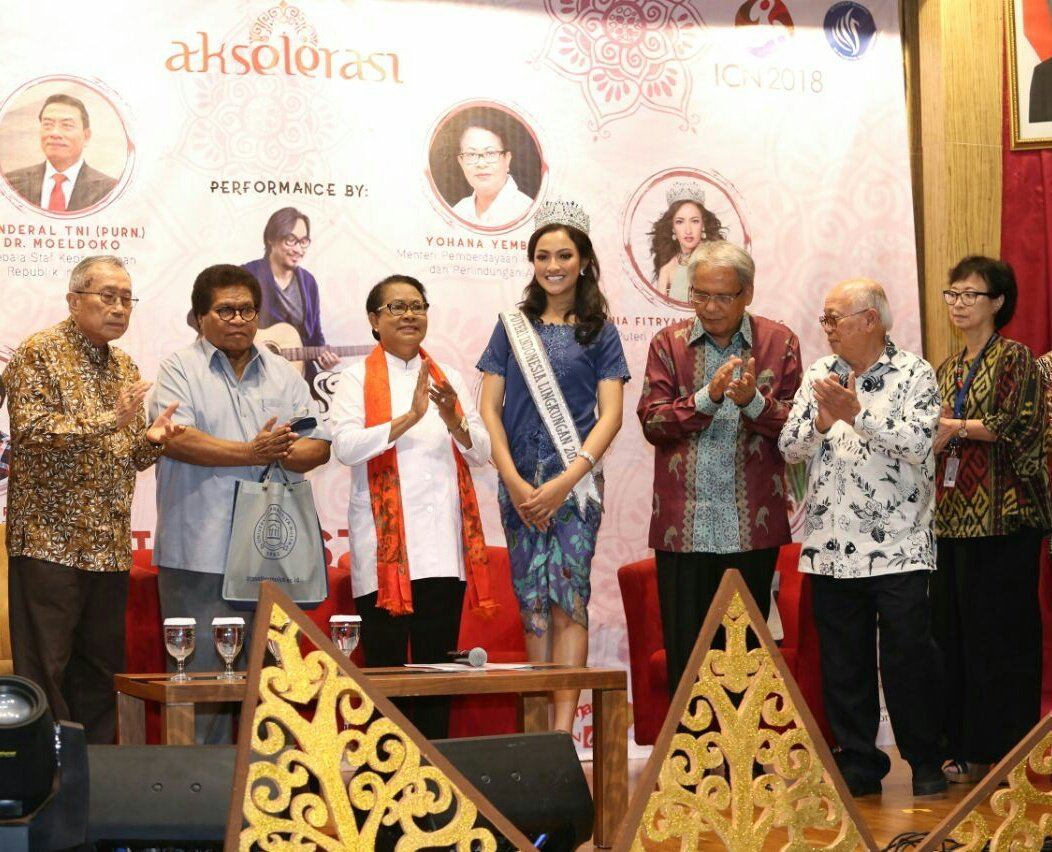
Vania (right) together with Yohana Yembise and Michael Manufandu in 2018.

Vania was born in Tangerang, Banten – Indonesia to traditional Javanese parents. She started her foray into fashion modelling at the age of 12, by joining Jakarta Fashion Week teenage-model search. She holds a bachelor degree in Chemical Engineering from Bandung Institute of Technology, Bandung, West Java, Indonesia.

During her reign as Puteri Indonesia Lingkungan, she popularly known for her recycling campaign during 2019 Indonesian general election to propose the Election Committee to recycle campaign props. In 2018, she appeared on the Top 50 Essay list on "Woman Technology Essay Competition" by Schlumberger and Young Leaders for Indonesia Regional Wave 4. Since May 2018, Vania was elected as The Head of Communication of The Ministry of Women Empowerment and Child Protection of the Republic of Indonesia by the minister Yohana Yembise.

== Pageantry ==
=== Puteri Banten 2018 ===
In 2018, Vania competed in the regional pageant of Puteri Banten 2018, and won the title to represent her province Banten in Puteri Indonesia 2018. She was crowned by the outgoing titleholder Ratu Vashti Annisa.

=== Puteri Indonesia 2018 ===
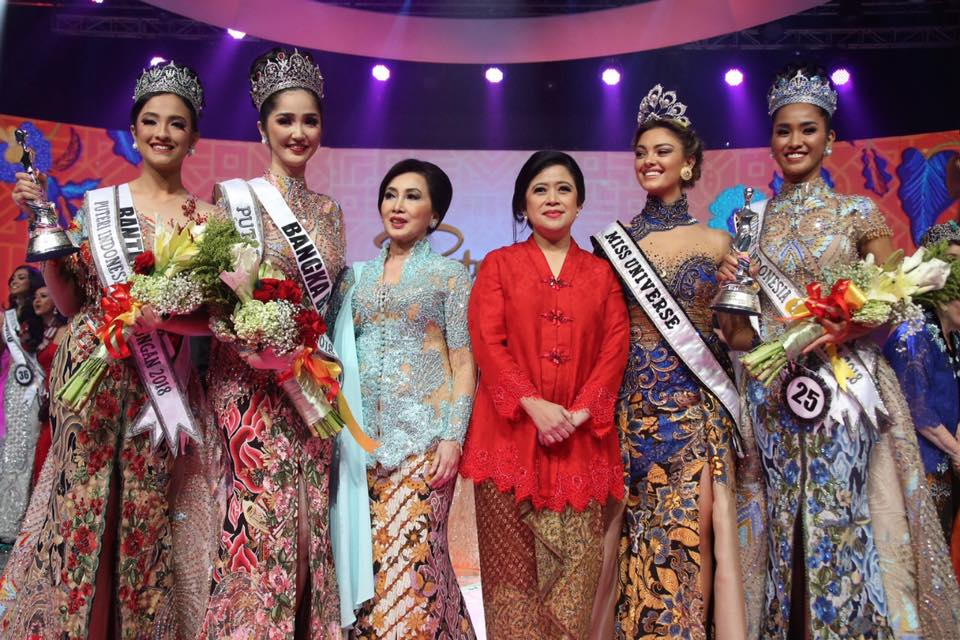
Vania (left) together with Puteri Indonesia 2018-Sonia Fergina Citra, Puteri Indonesia Pariwisata 2018-Wilda Octaviana Situngkir, Miss Universe 2017-Demi-Leigh Nel-Peters, Puan Maharani and Puteri Indonesia Chairman Putri Kuswisnuwardhani.

Vania was crowned as Puteri Indonesia Lingkungan 2018 at the grand finale held in Jakarta Convention Center, Jakarta, Indonesia on March 9, by the outgoing titleholder of Puteri Indonesia Lingkungan 2017 and Miss International 2017, Kevin Lilliana Junaedy of West Java. Vania represented the Banten province at the pageant.

The finale coronation night of Puteri Indonesia 2018 was attended by the reigning Miss Universe 2017 – Demi-Leigh Nel-Peters of South Africa, Miss International 2017 – Kevin Lilliana Junaedy of Indonesia, and Miss Supranational 2017 – Jenny Kim of South Korea, as main guest stars. Vania was crowned and appeared on the magazine cover of Tatler Indonesia together with Mooryati Soedibyo and Putri Kuswisnuwardhani.

=== Miss International 2018 ===
As Puteri Indonesia Lingkungan 2018, Vania represented Indonesia at the 58th edition of Miss International 2018 pageant in held in Tokyo Dome City Hall, Bunkyo, Tokyo, Japan. The finale was held on November 9, 2018, where she placed as one of the Top 15 finalists, she also won "Miss Panasonic Beauty" from Panasonic sponsor. Kevin Lilliana Junaedy of Indonesia crowned her successor Mariem Claret Velazco García of Venezuela by the end of the event.

== See also ==
- Puteri Indonesia 2018
- Miss International 2018
- Sonia Fergina Citra
- Wilda Octaviana Situngkir

Awards and achievements
Preceded by Ratu Vashti Annisa	Puteri Banten; 2018	Succeeded by Anastasia Praditha Adelina
Preceded by Kevin Lilliana Junaedy (West Java)	Puteri Indonesia Lingkungan; 2018	Succeeded by Jolene Marie Cholock-Rotinsulu (North Sulawesi)
