= Sonia Fergina Citra =

Indonesian model and Miss Universe Indonesia 2018 (born 1993)

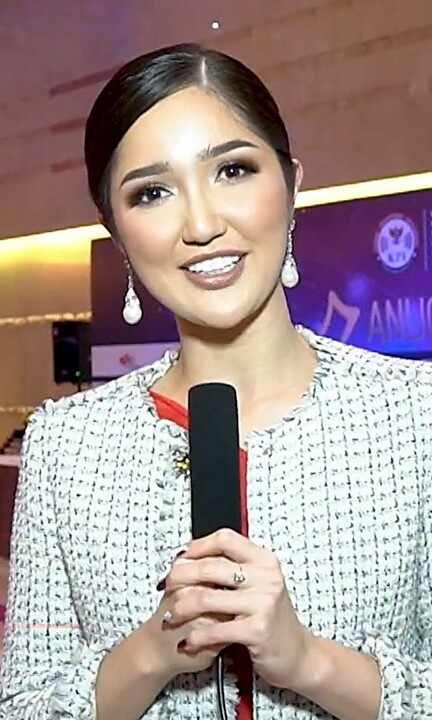
- Citra in 2019
- Born: Sonia Fergina Citra; 27 April 1993 (age 33); Tanjung Pandan, Bangka Belitung Islands, Indonesia
- Education: Bina Nusantara University; PPM School of Management
- Occupation: Model
- Beauty pageant titleholder
- Title: Puteri Indonesia 2018; Miss Universe Indonesia 2018
- Major competitions: Puteri Indonesia 2018; (Winner); Miss Universe 2018; (Top 20)

Sonia Fergina Citra (born 27 April 1993) is an Indonesian model and beauty pageant titleholder who won Puteri Indonesia 2018. She represented her country at the Miss Universe 2018 pageant held in at IMPACT Arena, Muang Thong Thani in Nonthaburi Province, north of Bangkok, Thailand. Citra became the sixth Indonesian, third Sumatran and the second representative of Bangka Belitung to place in the semifinals in Miss Universe history.

== Early life and education ==
Citra was born in Tanjung Pandan, Bangka Belitung province, to a Chinese Indonesian father Ken Prayoga and British mother, Fransiska Evelin Burtnor. on the province of Bangka Belitung Islands, Indonesia. She is the youngest of six siblings. She does Muay Thai, taekwondo and capoeira.

Citra began her modelling career in 2005, through the selection of Bangka Belitung Youth Model Faces. Prior to joining pageantry, she worked as a Digital Marketing Manager for a national distributor company in Jakarta. Sonia decided to make a breakthrough to follow her childhood dream, which is to represent her country at an international level through beauty pageant.

Citra holds a bachelor's degree in English literature from Bina Nusantara University, Jakarta, Indonesia. She is currently finishing her master's degree in business management from PPM School of Management. On 20 November 2021, Citra married Yoanes Naftalianto.

== Advocacy and issues ==
Citra is active in various social causes associated with the organization “Diberi Untuk Memberi” (Accepting for Giving). She helps in providing free food to earthquake victims, school renovation and education assistance. Sonia is also involved in environmental conservation activities related to coral reef adoption at Tanjung Kelayang Beach, Belitung.

Since her crowning, Citra has advocated for HIV awareness, Breast cancer and Cervical cancer, and also creating mental healing for the children and victims of natural calamities and disaster in Palu and Lombok.

On November 21, 2018, Citra shared her appearance together with NCCC Indonesia (National Cervical Cancer Coalition of Indonesia) at national congress Duta Kanker Serviks - Jakarta for Indonesia Cervical Cancer Day. She also worked together with local NGO called Nara Creative to create #BeDiverseBeTolerant notebook, filled with her biodiversity family background and how she survived bullying at school.

== Pageantry ==
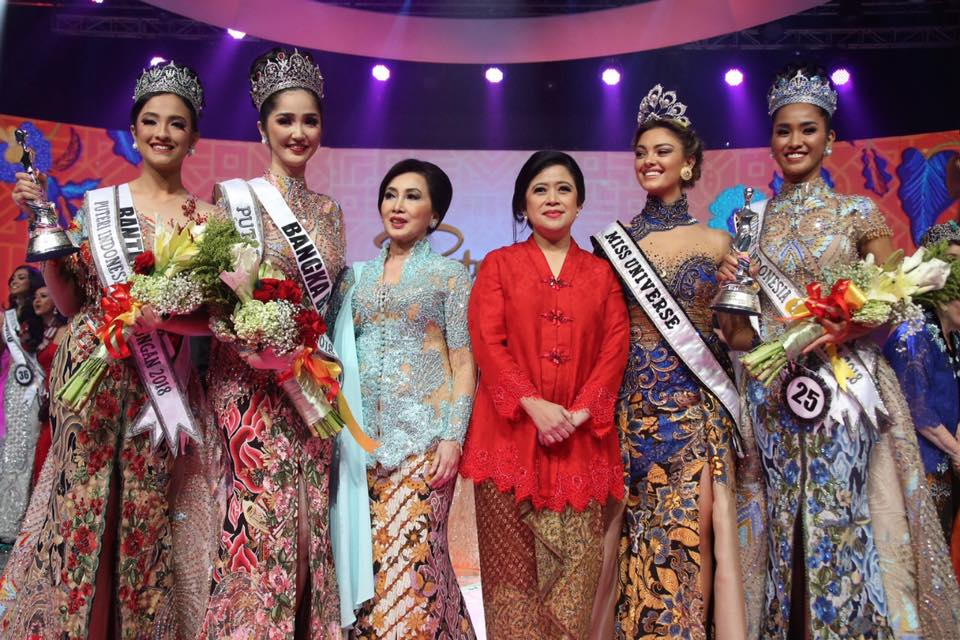
Citra together with Puteri Indonesia Lingkungan 2018-Vania Fitryanti, Puteri Indonesia Pariwisata 2018-Wilda Octaviana, Miss Universe 2017-Demi-Leigh Nel-Peters, Puan Maharani and Puteri Indonesia Chairman Putri Kuswisnuwardhani.

=== Puteri Indonesia 2018 ===
On March 9, 2018, Citra represented Bangka Belitung province and won Puteri Indonesia 2018, in which she was crowned the winner. at the Jakarta Convention Center, Jakarta. She was crowned by her predecessor, Bunga Jelitha of Jakarta SCR.

The runners-up were Vania Fitryanti (as Puteri Indonesia Lingkungan 2018) and Wilda Octaviana (as Puteri Indonesia Pariwisata 2018).

=== Miss Universe 2018 ===
On December 17, 2018, Citra represented Indonesia at Miss Universe 2018 in Bangkok, Thailand, and reached the top 20, against 74 contestants. Citra is the sixth Indonesian Miss Universe semifinalist in history since Artika Sari Devi (from Bangka Belitung) first made it to the semifinals in 2005. During the contest, Citra gave a speech in the opening statements, in which the top 20 semifinalists shared a statement on how they wanted the world to know them as a person. She said:

Being raised with a family from four different religions, and seeing there are many cultural differences and also religion intolerance and gender inequality have been the cause of the trouble in Indonesia and also persecution. This inspired me to do a campaign called Be Diverse, Be Tolerant to encourage all the people to embrace the differences and respect for others.

== Gallery ==
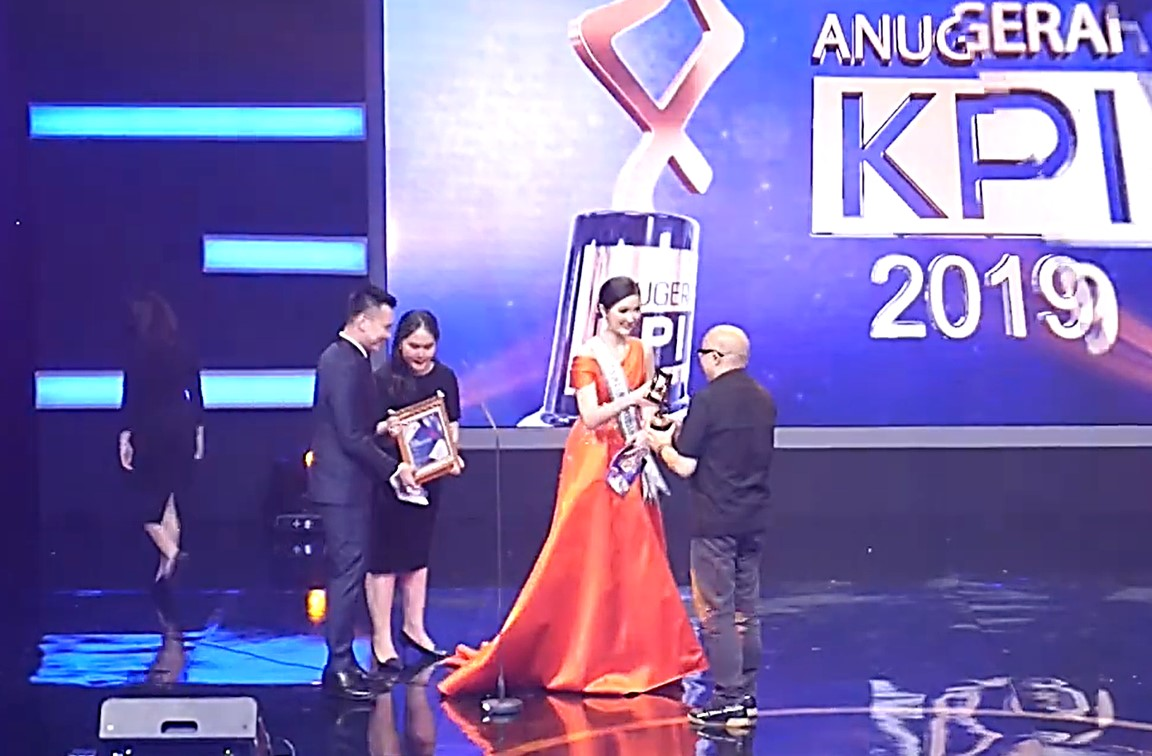
Citra (in orange gown) presenting an Indonesian Broadcasting Commission event - "Anugerah KPI 2019" on 9 December 2019.

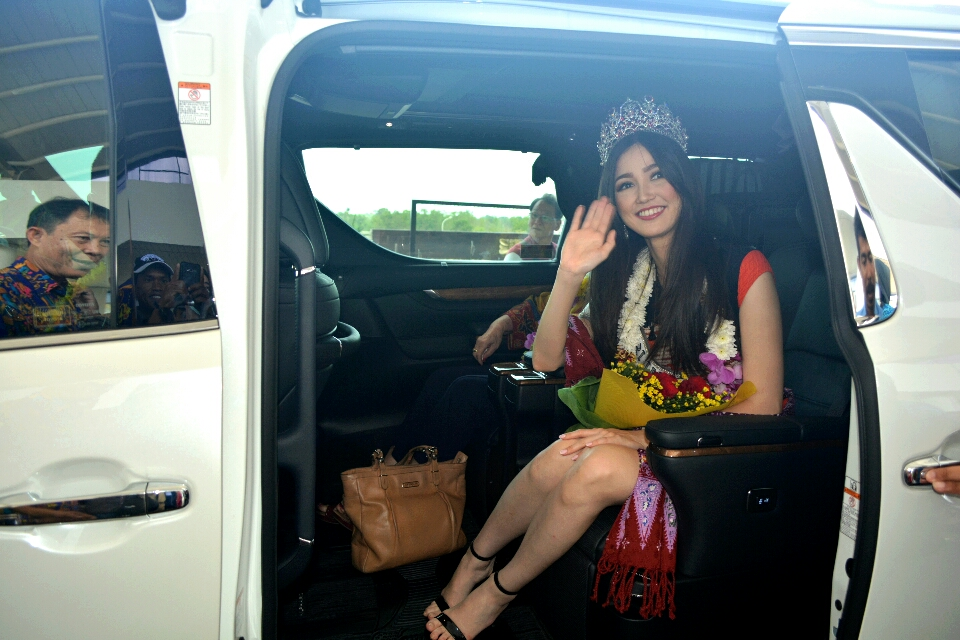
Citra during her homecoming to Bangka Belitung Islands on 19 March 2018.

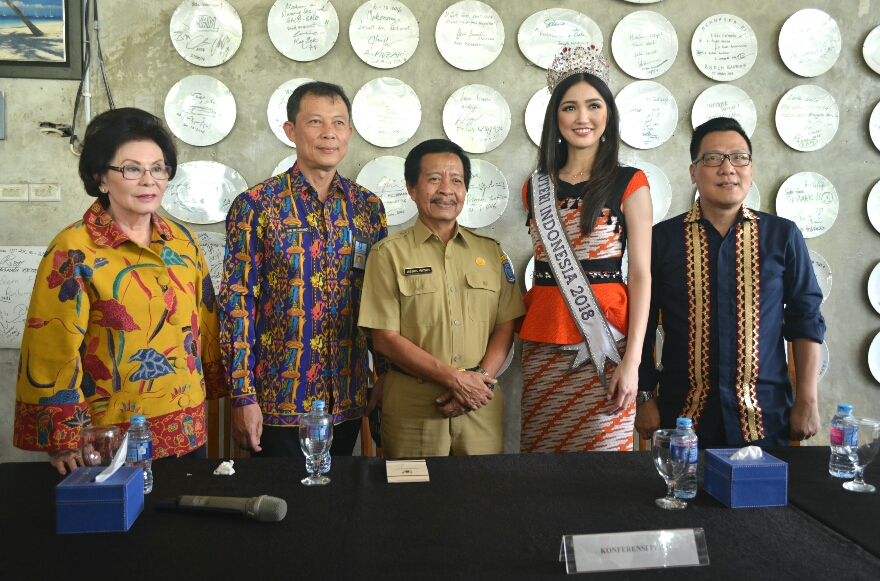
Citra (second from right) Homecoming in Bangka Belitung Islands with Indonesian Child Protection Commission on 19 March 2018

== See also ==
Awards and achievements
Preceded by Cut Nadia Dwi Ramadhani	Puteri Indonesia Bangka Belitung; 2018	Succeeded by Ritassya Wellgreat
Preceded by Bunga Jelitha, Jakarta SCR 5	Puteri Indonesia; 2018	Succeeded by Frederika Alexis Cull, Jakarta SCR 1
