= Karina Nadila =

Indonesian actress, model, television host, and beauty pageant titleholder

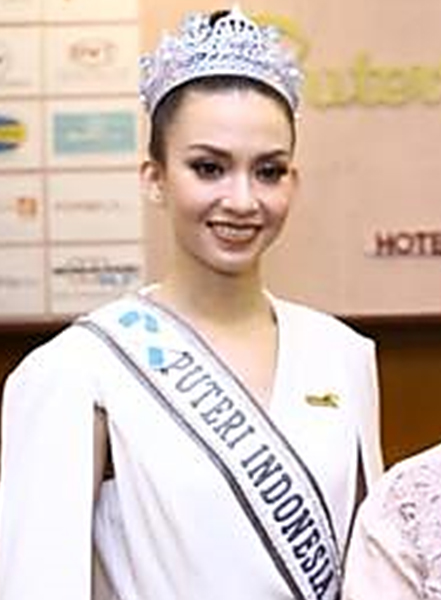
- Karina as Puteri Indonesia Pariwisata 2017
- Born: Karina Nadila Niab; August 21, 1992 (age 34); Jakarta, Indonesia
- Education: Indonesia Banking School
- Occupations: Film actress; TV presenter; beauty-preneur; commercial model
- Height: 1.71 m (5 ft 7 in)
- Spouse: Rangga Prihartanto (married since 2020)
- Beauty pageant titleholder
- Title: Puteri Indonesia Pariwisata 2017; Miss Supranational Indonesia 2017
- Hair color: Reddish Brown
- Eye color: Brown
- Major competitions: Puteri Indonesia 2017; (2nd Runner-up – Puteri Indonesia Pariwisata 2017); Miss Supranational 2017; (Top 25)

Signature
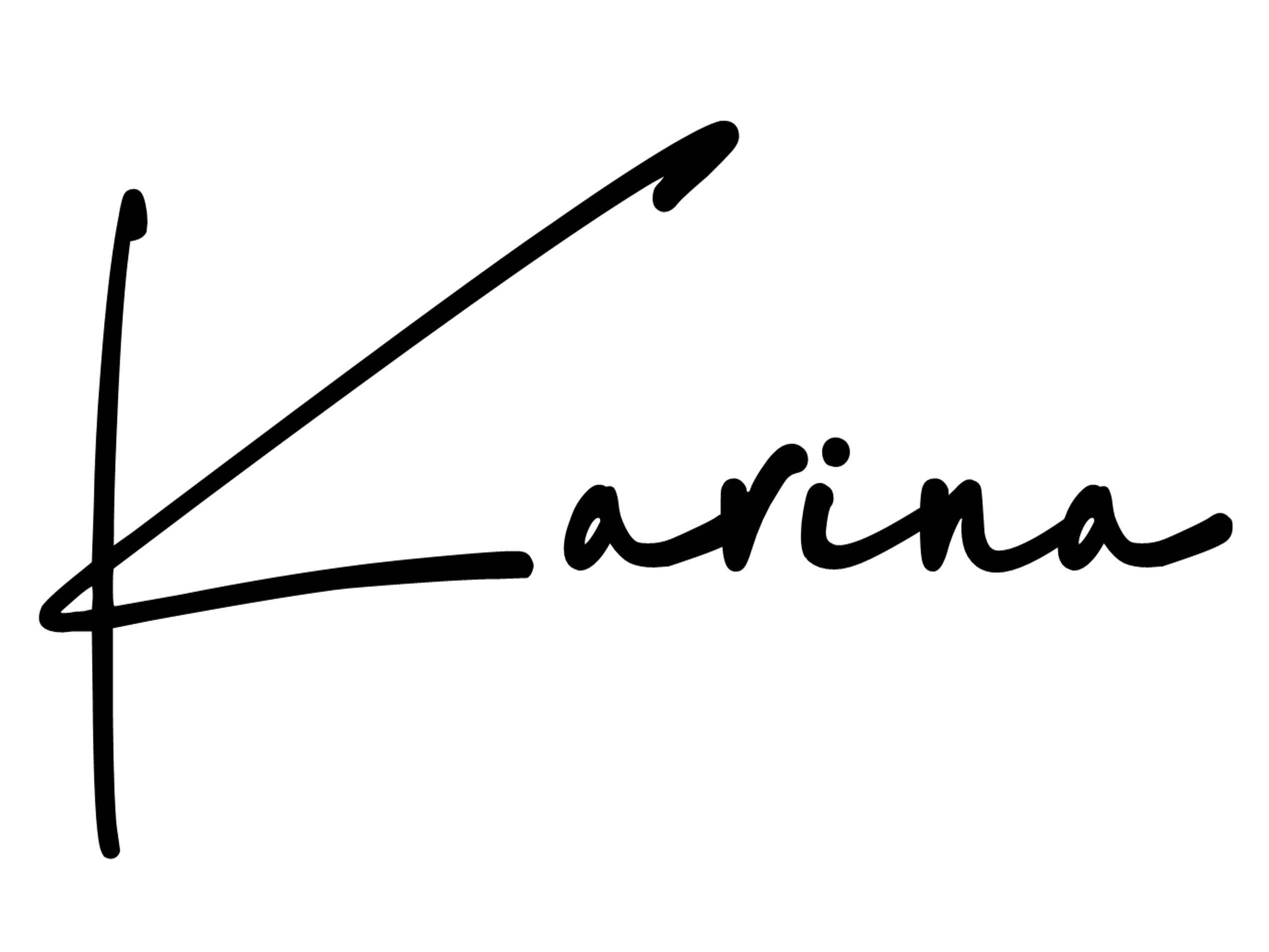

Karina Nadila Niab (born August 21, 1992) is an Indonesian actress, commercial model, television host, beauty-preneur and beauty pageant titleholder who was crowned Puteri Indonesia Pariwisata 2017 at the Puteri Indonesia 2017 beauty pageant, and represented Indonesia at the Miss Supranational 2017 pageant.

== Personal life and education ==
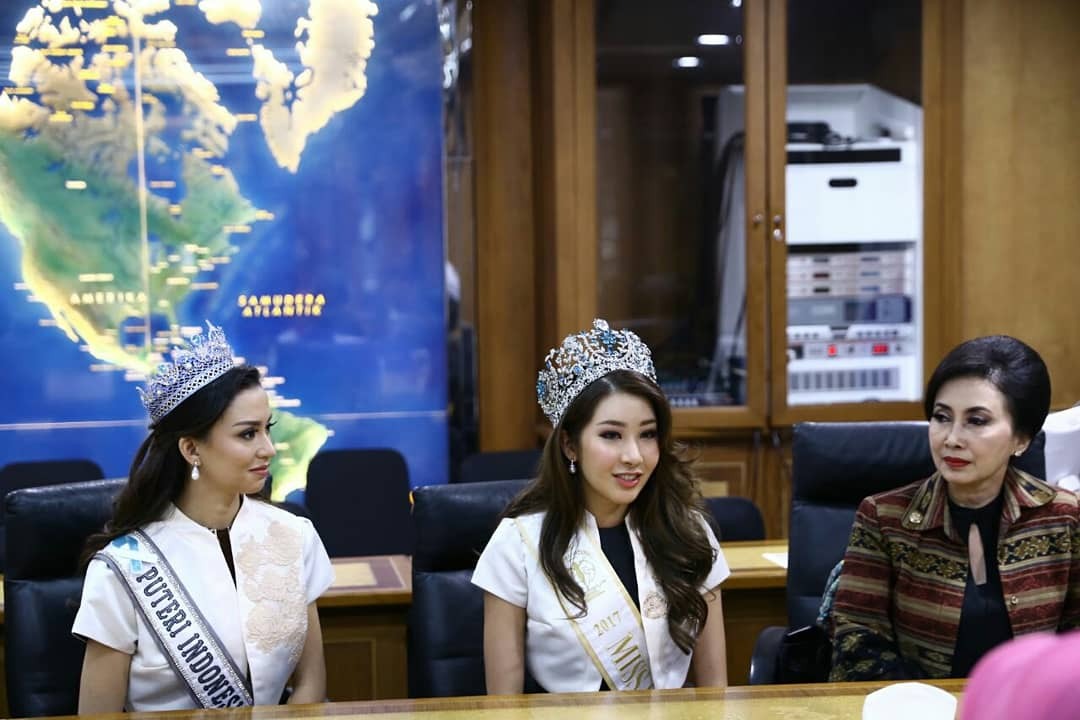
Karina (left) together with Miss Supranational 2017 - Jenny Kim (center), Putri Kuswisnuwardhani (right) during the Ministry of Tourism and Creative Economy of The Republic of Indonesia and Puteri Indonesia Organization Press Conference.

Karina was born in Jakarta, Indonesia, on 21 August 1992 to an unknown father and a Minangkabaunese-Dutch mother, Jumaini Weissheimer. Her step-father, Lukius Niab, is a traditional Timorese. Karina decided to become a beauty-preneur, model and make up content creator at the age of 17. Since then, she has worked with several beauty brands and grown in popularity. Until she approached by film producer to acting on several cinema films. she is also starting to be a TV presenter and co-hosting several TV shows.

Karina finishing her secondary study in Bakti Ibu Islamic Secondary School, 19 Junior High School and 82 Senior High School - Jakarta. She holds a bachelor's degree in business accounting from Indonesia Banking School, Jakarta, Indonesia. She is currently finishing her master's degree in business management from PPM School of Management. On 19 December 2020, Karina married with Indonesian businessman, Rangga Prihartanto. The wedding event was held on Jakarta Convention Centre with a Minangkabau style.

== Pageantry ==
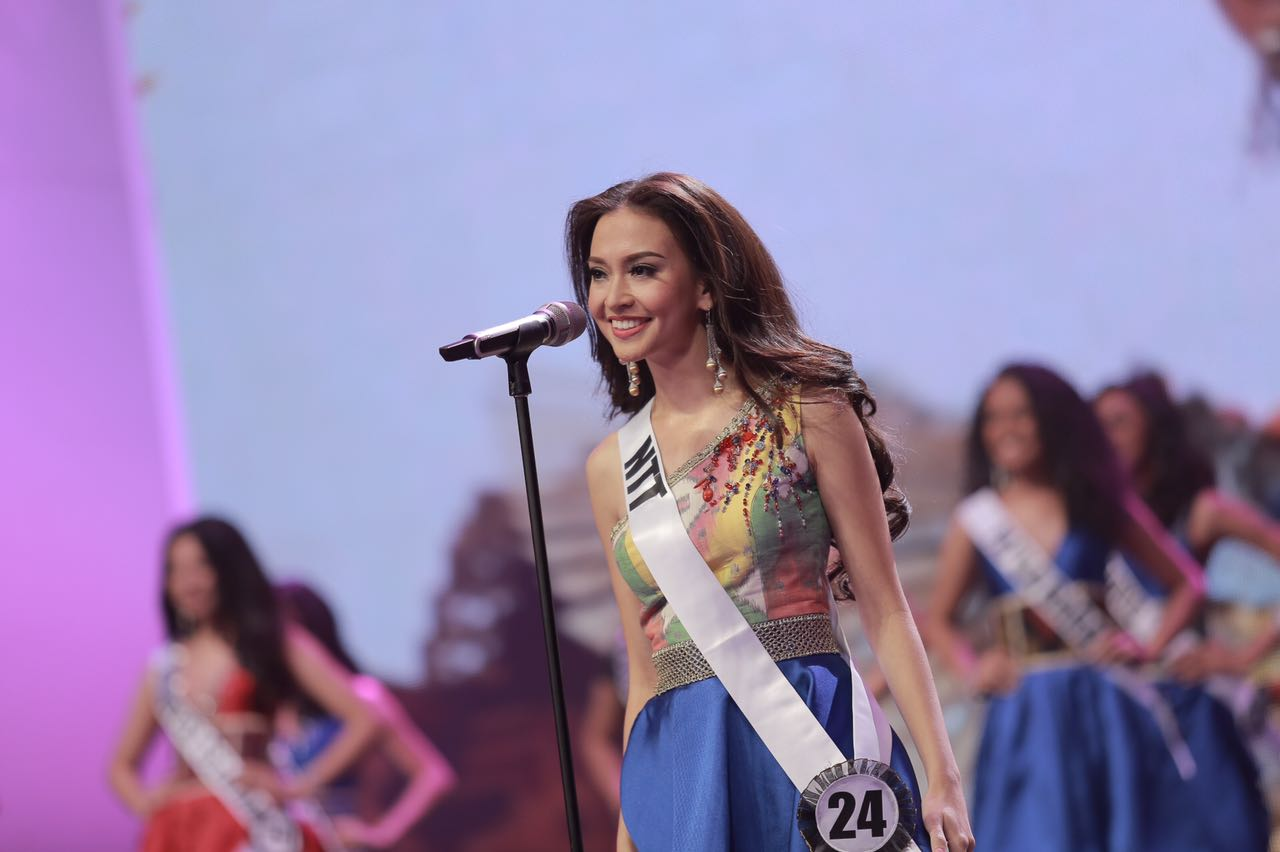
Karina representing her province East Nusa Tenggara at Puteri Indonesia 2017 Coronation Night.

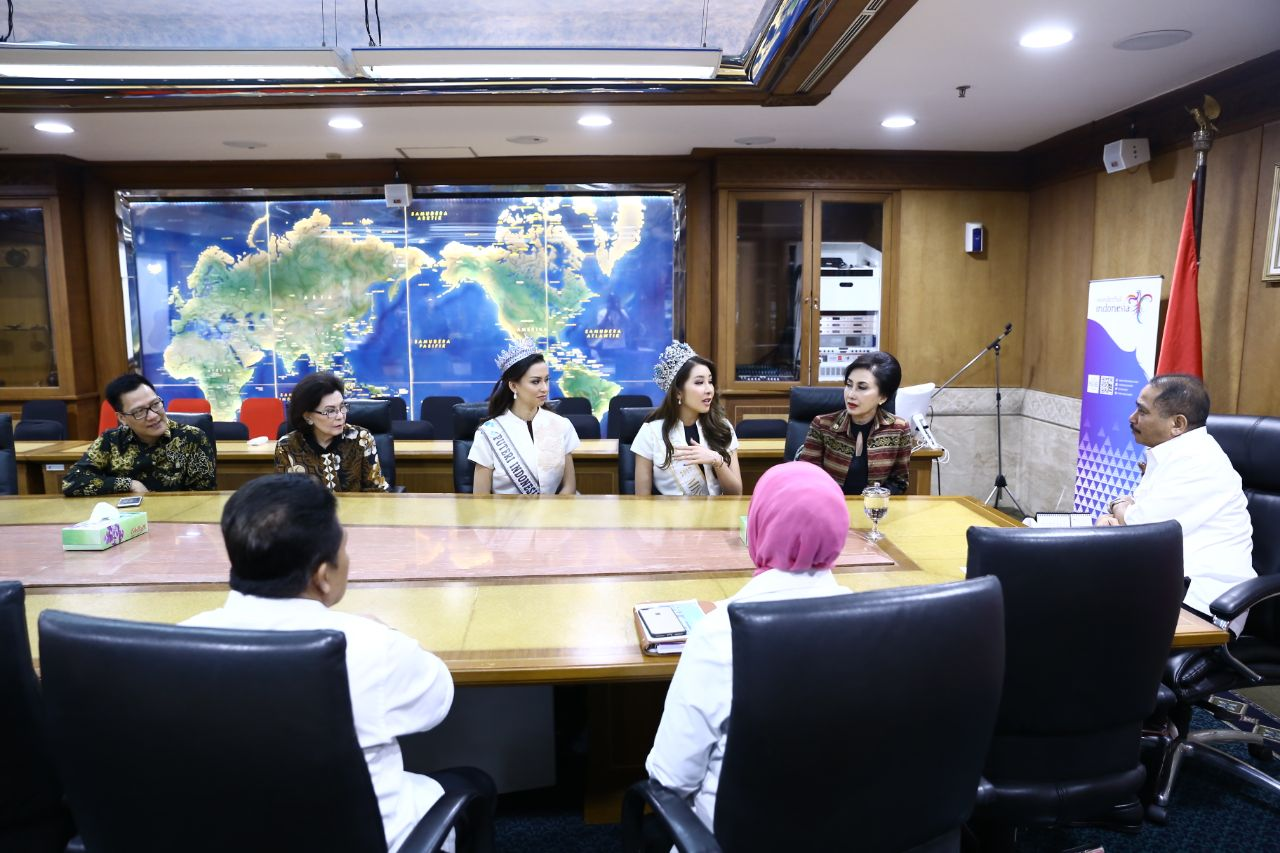
Karina as Puteri Indonesia Pariwisata 2017 together with Miss Supranational 2017 - Jenny Kim, during the Ministry of Tourism and Creative Economy of The Republic of Indonesia and Puteri Indonesia Organization Press Conference.

=== Puteri Indonesia 2017 ===
Karina was crowned Puteri Indonesia East Nusa Tenggara 2017, by that she gain the rights to represent the province of East Nusa Tenggara at Puteri Indonesia 2017. During finals night on March 31, 2017, held in Jakarta Convention Center, Karina crowned as Puteri Indonesia Pariwisata, which gave her the title of Miss Supranational Indonesia 2017, she was crowned by her predecessor of Puteri Indonesia Pariwisata 2016 and Top 10 Miss Supranational 2016, Intan Aletrinö of West Sumatra. This is the very first time East Nusa Tenggara captured the Puteri Indonesia's crown.

Karina crowned together with Puteri Indonesia; Bunga Jelitha Ibrani of Jakarta Special Capital Region 5, Puteri Indonesia Lingkungan; Kevin Lilliana Junaedy of West Java, and Puteri Indonesia Perdamaian; Dea Goesti Rizkita Koswara of Central Java.

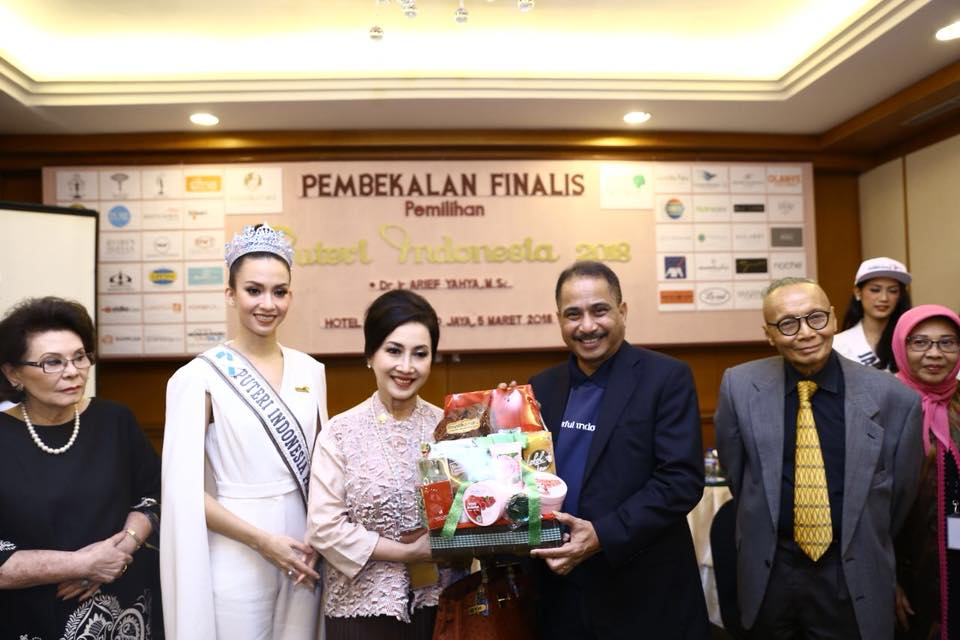
Karina (two from the left) as a speaker together with Ministry of Tourism and Creative Economy of The Republic of Indonesia during Puteri Indonesia 2018 press conference.

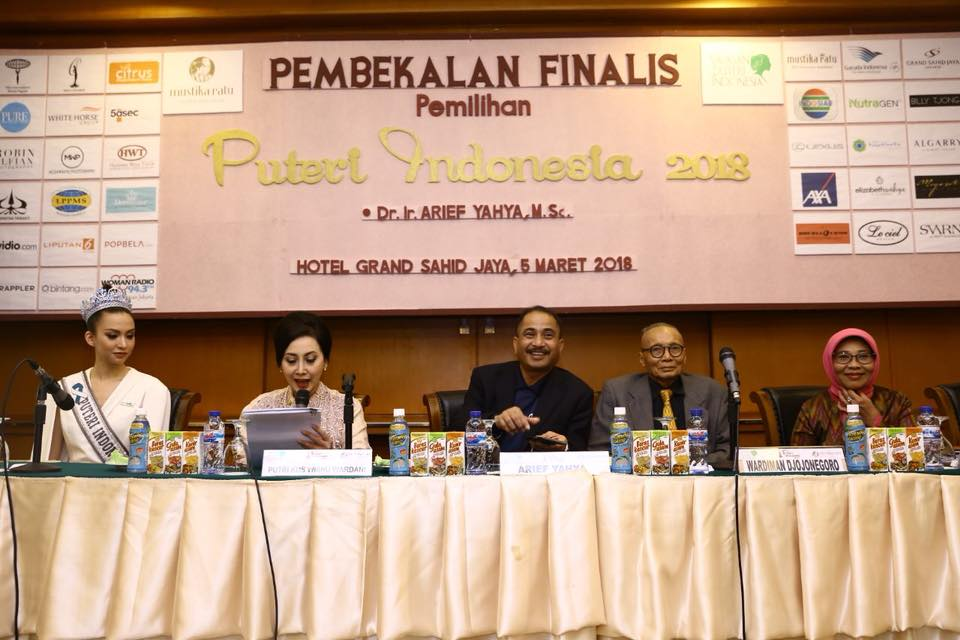
Karina (left) as a speaker together with Ministry of Tourism and Creative Economy of The Republic of Indonesia during Puteri Indonesia 2018 press conference.

=== Miss Supranational 2017 ===
As Puteri Indonesia Pariwisata 2017, Karina represented Indonesia at the 9th edition of Miss Supranational 2017 held on 1 December 2017 at Hala MOSiR Arena in Krynica-Zdrój, Poland, where she ended up placing into Top 25 semifinalists, where she placed in the 14th ranked. This is the fourth time placements for Indonesia in Miss Supranational history and the third consecutive years of semifinalists placements since 2015 by Gresya Amanda Maaliwuga and 2016 by Intan Aletrinö.

Karina brought a national costume weighed 30 kg (66 lb) with Lembuswana-inspired ensemble, Lembuswana is an animal in Kutai folk mythology. The costume named "Lembuswana: The Apparatus of The King" was designed by Jember Fashion Carnaval.

== Filmography ==
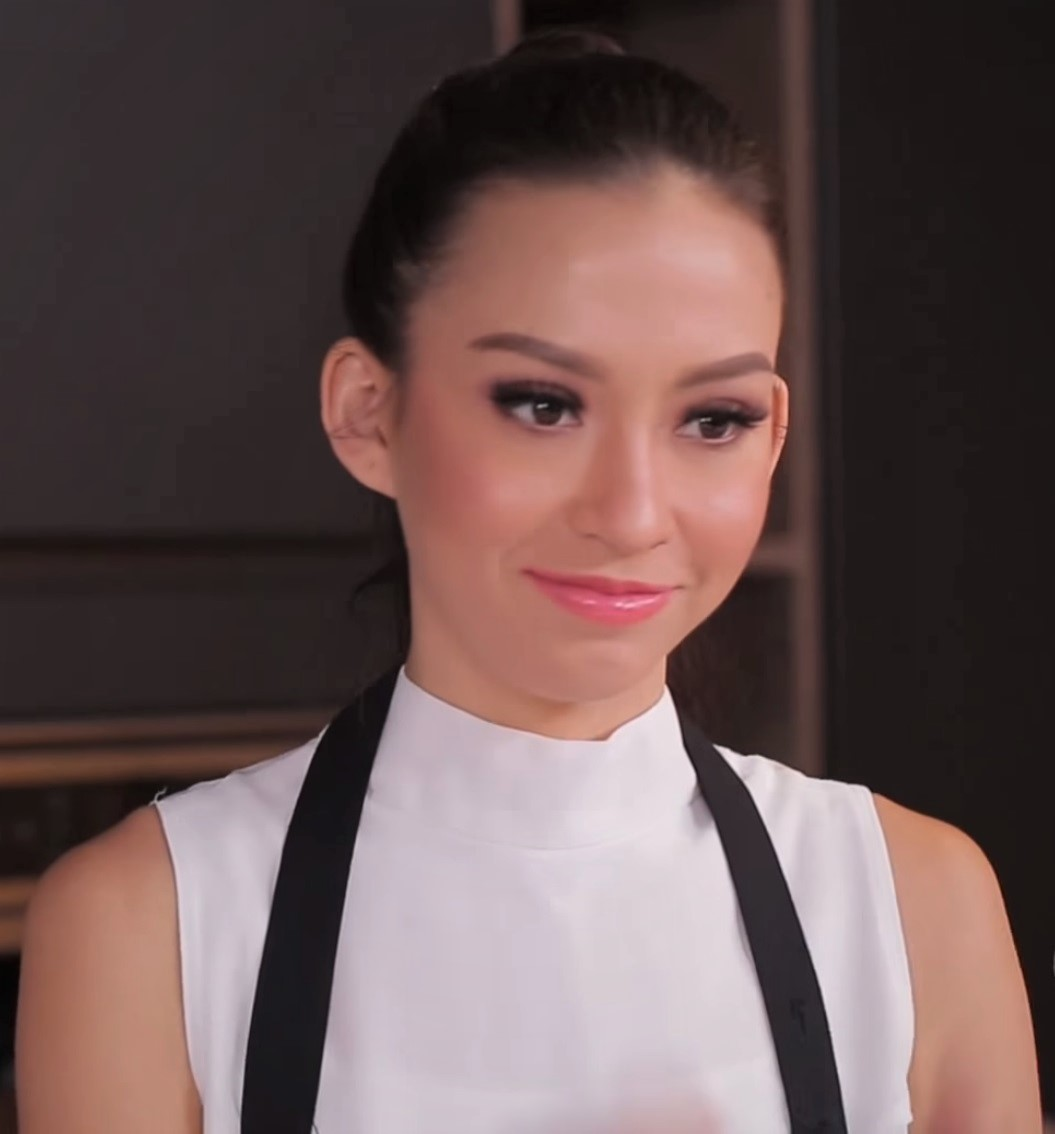
Nadila on NET.TV - Chef's Table television cooking program in 2017.

Karina has appeared on several movies. She has acted in a television film and cinema box-office film. She is also taking part as the presenter for TV show.

=== Cinema films ===
Year	Title	Role	Notes	Ref.
2010	Gaby dan Lagunya	as Gaby	Debut film; main role	
2011	Pirate Brothers	as Melanie	Recurring role	
2014	Aku, Kau & KUA	as Mona	Recurring role	
2015	Tuyul Part 1	as Ratna	Recurring role	
2015	Pizza Man	as Nina	Main role	
2016	Abdullah & Takeshi	as Rina	Recurring role	
2016	Super Didi	as Wina	Main role	
2016	Sundul Gan: The Story of Kaskus	as Gabriela	Cameo appearances	
2016	Koala Kumal	as Employee	Cameo appearances	
2017	Mantan	as Frida	Main role	
2017	Sweet 20	as Shoes salesperson	Cameo appearances	
2019	Imperfect: Karier, Cinta & Timbangan	as Irene	Main role	
2022	Oma: The Demonic	as Fiona	Main role	

=== Television films ===
Year	Title	Broadcaster	Role	Ref.
2008	Muslimah	Soraya Intercine Films	Main role as Izza Tausiah	
2009	Inayah	Soraya Intercine Films	Main role as Mia	
2011-2012	Senggol-Senggol Asmara	MD Entertainment	Main role as Keysha	
2013	Mimpi Laila (Laila's Dream)	Trans TV	Main role as Laila	
2013	Perkawinan Di atas Kebohongan (A marriage on the falseness)	Trans TV	Main role as Celia	
2013	Aku Hamil, Suami Punya Pacar (I'm Pregnant, But My Husband has a Girlfriend)	Trans TV	Main role as Sirena	
2014	Aku Tak Sanggup Diduakan (I can't be left behind)	Trans TV	Main role as Samantha	
2014	Permata Khatulistiwa (Jewel of Equator)	Trans TV	Main role as Hannah	
2014	Calon Istri Terdzalimi (Prospective Wife Harassed)	Trans TV	Main role as Vivian	
2015	Suami Pilihan Pacarku (My Husband is My Boyfriend's Choice)	Indosiar	Main role as Marlene	
2015	Tulah Penggalang Dana Palsu (The Curse of Fake Fundraisers)	Indosiar	Main role as Vanessa	
2015	Pengasuh Anakku, Ibu Kandung Anakku (My Babysitter is My Child's Biological Mom)	Indosiar	Main role as Anja	
2015	Tulah Ibu Gila Harta (The Curse of Mad Treasure)	Indosiar	Main role as Selena	
2015	Tragedi Ulang Tahun Pernikahan (Wedding Anniversary Tragedy)	Indosiar	Main role as Calista	
2015	Kenapa Dia Bahagia Dan Aku Menderita? (Why is he happy and I am suffering?)	Indosiar	Main role as Tiffany	
2016	Susahnya Punya Suami Pembohong (It's hard to have a liar husband)	Indosiar	Main role as Eva	
2016	Rahasia Tuhan: Surat Untuk Allah (God's Secret: A Letter To Allah)	Trans7	Main role as Sandra	
2016	Cermin Kehidupan: Berkah Khitan Dua Jagoan (Mirror of Life: Blessings of Circumcision of Two Heroes)	Trans7	Main role as Denise	
2016	Cermin Kehidupan: Khusnul Khotimah Di Hari Jumat (Mirror of Life: Khusnul Khotimah on Friday)	Trans7	Main role as Celine	
2016	Cermin Kehidupan: Dikejar Dosa Mahar (Mirror of Life: Pursued by Dowry Sin)	Trans7	Main role as Kylie	
2019	Jodoh Wasiat Bapak	Tobali Putra Productions	Main role as Olive	
2019	Oh Mama Oh Papa	id:Verona Pictures	Main role as Sirena	
2021	Imperfect the Series (musim pertama)	WeTV and Iflix	Main role as Irene	
2021	Jodoh Wasiat Bapak Babak 2	Tobali Putra Productions	Main role as Nana	

=== Television shows ===
Year	Title	Broadcaster	Role	Ref.
2015	Mission X	Trans TV	Talkshow Host	
2016	Katakan Putus	Trans TV	Talkshow Host	
2016-2019	Waktu Indonesia Bercanda	NET. TV	Comedian Talkshow Host	
2018-2019	Alkisah	NET. TV	Comedian Host	
2019	Puteri Indonesia 2019	SCTV	Co-host	
2019-2020	Peristawa	NET. TV	Comedian Talkshow Host	
2020	Puteri Indonesia 2020	SCTV	Co-host	
2021	The Net.izen	NET.TV	Talkshow Host	

== Awards and nomination ==
Year	Awards	Category	Nominated work	Result	Ref.
2014	2014 Maya Awards	Maya Award for Best Actress in a Supporting Role	Aku, Kau & KUA	Nominated	

Awards and achievements
Preceded by Gloria Angelica Radja Gah	Puteri East Nusa Tenggara (NTT); 2017	Succeeded by Melati Tabita Kirana Thei
Preceded by Intan Aletrinö (West Sumatra)	Puteri Indonesia Pariwisata; 2017	Succeeded by Wilda Octaviana (West Kalimantan)
