= Puteri Indonesia 2018 =

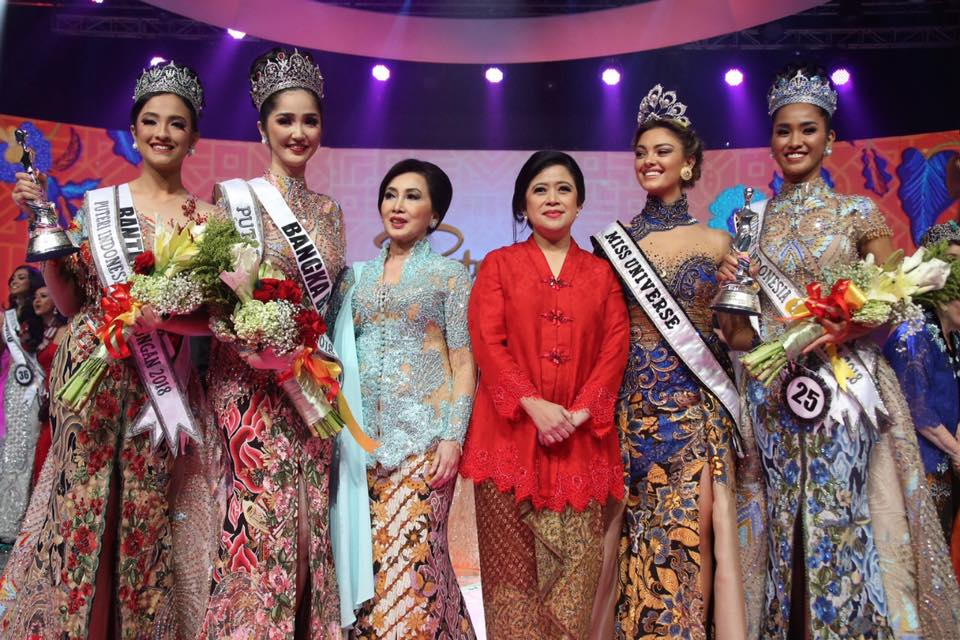
- Vania Fitryanti, Sonia Fergina Citra and Wilda Octaviana, together with Demi-Leigh Nel-Peters
- Date: March 9, 2018
- Presenters: Andhika Pratama; Farhannisa Nasution; Intan Aletrino; Fero Walandouw
- Entertainment: Jaz; Afgan Syahreza; Rizky Febian; Isyana Sarasvati; Lesti Andryani
- Theme: The Beauty of Parahyangan
- Venue: Jakarta Convention Center, Jakarta, Indonesia
- Broadcaster: Indosiar
- Entrants: 39
- Placements: 11
- Returns: Central Kalimantan
- Winner: Puteri Indonesia – Sonia Fergina Citra; Bangka Belitung; Puteri Indonesia Lingkungan – Vania Fitryanti Herlambang; Banten; Puteri Indonesia Pariwisata – Wilda Octaviana Situngkir; West Kalimantan; Puteri Indonesia Perdamaian – Dilla Fadiela; Yogyakarta SR
- Congeniality: St. Humaerah Husnul Hotimah; West Sulawesi

Putri Indonesia 2018, the 22nd Puteri Indonesia pageant, was held on March 9, 2018 at Jakarta Convention Center, Jakarta, Indonesia. Bunga Jelitha, Puteri Indonesia 2017 of Jakarta SCR 5, crowned her successor, Sonia Fergina Citra of Bangka Belitung, at the end of the event. She defeated 38 other candidates to win the title of Miss Universe Indonesia 2018 and represented Indonesia at Miss Universe 2018, where she placed as one of the Top 20 finalists.

This edition also witnessed the crowning moment of other titleholders who would represent Indonesia at the major international pageants. Vania Fitryanti Herlambang of Banten was crowned as Miss International Indonesia 2018 by the reigning Puteri Indonesia Lingkungan 2017 and Miss International 2017, Kevin Lilliana Junaedy. She represented Indonesia at Miss International 2018. Wilda Octaviana Situngkir of West Kalimantan was crowned as Miss Supranational Indonesia 2018 by the reigning Puteri Indonesia Pariwisata 2017, Karina Nadila Niab. She represented Indonesia at Miss Supranational 2018.

This year's pageant featured the Colorful West Java theme, as well as a series of Puteri Indonesia quarantine events being held in the city of Bogor and Bandung in West Java. Contestants from 39 provinces participated this year.

The finale was graced by Miss Universe 2017, Demi-Leigh Nel-Peters of South Africa, Miss International 2017 Kevin Lilliana of Indonesia, and Miss Supranational 2017, Jenny Kim of South Korea.

== Results ==
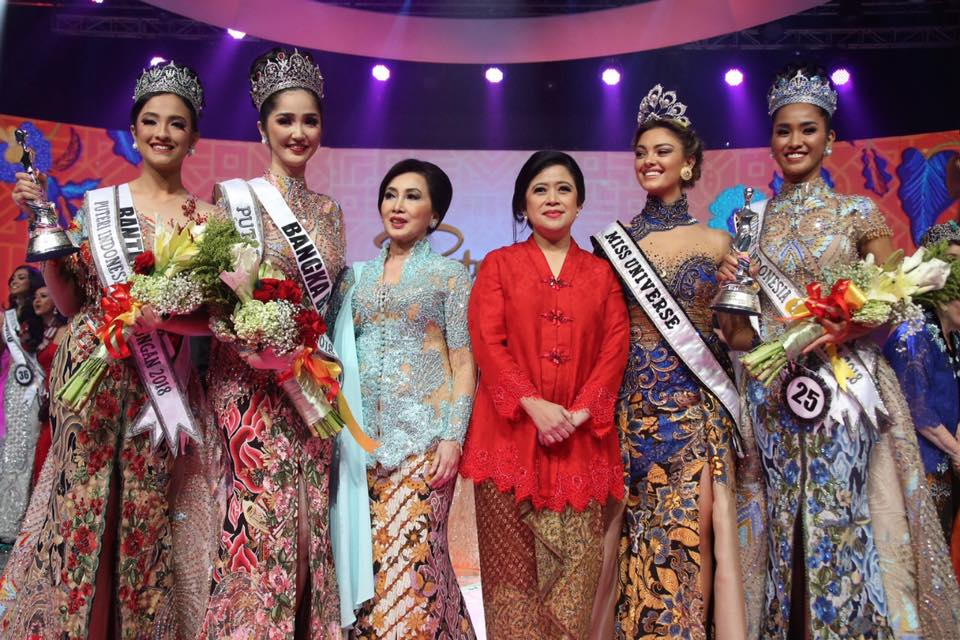
Putri Indonesia 2018 Queens together with Miss Universe 2017-Demi-Leigh Nel-Peters, Puan Maharani and Puteri Indonesia National Director Putri Kuswisnuwardhani.

=== Main ===
The Crowns of Puteri Indonesia 2018 Title Holders

Puteri Indonesia 2018 (Miss Universe Indonesia 2018)
Puteri Indonesia Lingkungan 2018 (Miss International Indonesia 2018)
Puteri Indonesia Pariwisata 2018 (Miss Supranational Indonesia 2018)
Puteri Indonesia Perdamaian 2018 (Puteri Indonesia 2018 Runner-up)

| Final Results | Contestant | International Placement |
|---|---|---|
| Puteri Indonesia 2018 (Miss Universe Indonesia) | Bangka Belitung – Sonia Fergina Citra | Top 20 – Miss Universe 2018 |
| Puteri Indonesia Lingkungan 2018 (Miss International Indonesia) | Banten – Vania Fitryanti Herlambang | Top 15 – Miss International 2018 |
| Puteri Indonesia Pariwisata 2018 (Miss Supranational Indonesia) | West Kalimantan – Wilda Octaviana Situngkir | 3rd Runner-up – Miss Supranational 2018 |
| Puteri Indonesia Perdamaian 2018 (Puteri Indonesia Runner-up) | SR Yogyakarta – Dilla Fadiela | |
| Top 6 | 4th Runner-up South Sumatra – Berliana Permatasari; 5th Runner-up Central Java – Kidung Paramadita | |
| Top 11 | West Sumatra – Resti Asda Parwanti; Lampung – Shafira Bella Sukma; Jakarta SCR 2 – Asti Wulan Adaninggar; Jakarta SCR 4 – Jesslyn Lim; Jakarta SCR 6 – Karina Fariza Ambrosini Basrewan § | |

§ Voted into the Top 11 by Social Media

=== Special Award ===
| Title | Contestant |
|---|---|
| Puteri Indonesia Persahabatan (Miss Congeniality) | West Sulawesi - St. Humaerah Husnul Hotimah |
| Puteri Indonesia Intelegensia (Miss Intelligence) | (gold) Jakarta SCR 4- Jesslyn Lim; (gold) Bangka Belitung - Sonia Fergina Citra; (gold) West Sumatra - Resti Asda |
| Puteri Indonesia Berbakat (Miss Talent) | (gold) Aceh - Nadia Puspa Dewi; (silver) West Kalimantan - Wilda Octaviana Situngkir; (bronze) SR Yogyakarta - Dilla Fadiela |
| Best Traditional Costume | (gold) South Sulawesi - Adlina Nadhilah; (silver) Bangka Belitung - Sonia Fergina Citra; (bronze) South Sumatra - Berliana Permatasari |
| Best Evening Gown | (gold) West Sumatra - Resti Asda; (silver) SR Yogyakarta - Dilla Fadiela; (bronze) West Sulawesi - St. Humaerah Husnul Hotimah |

=== Puteri Indonesia Kepulauan ===
Favorite Contestant by votes on Instagram from each group Island:

| Title | Contestant |
|---|---|
| Puteri Indonesia Sumatra (Princess of Sumatra) | North Sumatra - Sri Bunga Rizky |
| Puteri Indonesia Jawa (Princess of Java) | West Java - Tria Devitasari |
| Puteri Indonesia Nusa-Bali (Princess of Lesser Sunda Islands) | Bali - Anak Agung Ayu Mirah Cynthia Dewi |
| Puteri Indonesia Kalimantan (Princess of Kalimantan) | South Kalimantan - Putri Intan Kasela |
| Puteri Indonesia Sulawesi (Princess of Sulawesi) | North Sulawesi - Stevany Carolin Tanjaya |
| Puteri Indonesia Timur (Princess of Eastern Indonesia) | Maluku- Leinda Mellisa Wattimena |

== Candidates ==
39 delegates competed in this year competition.

| Province | Name | Age | Height | Hometown |
|---|---|---|---|---|
SUMATRA
| Aceh | Nandia Deva Puspa Dewi | 22 | 1.72 m (5 ft 8 in) | Banda Aceh |
| North Sumatra | Sri Bunga Rizky | 21 | 1.75 m (5 ft 9 in) | Medan |
| West Sumatra | Resti Asda Parwanti | 24 | 1.75 m (5 ft 9 in) | Pariaman |
| Riau | Firsi Alda Feligia | 20 | 1.72 m (5 ft 8 in) | Pekanbaru |
| Riau Islands | Yessy Fouryana Manullang | 20 | 1.71 m (5 ft 7 in) | Batam |
| Jambi | Amalia Soleha Syaihu | 21 | 1.70 m (5 ft 7 in) | Lubuk Linggau |
| South Sumatra | Berliana Permatasari | 19 | 1.75 m (5 ft 9 in) | Palembang |
| Bangka Belitung | Sonia Fergina Citra | 24 | 1.78 m (5 ft 10 in) | Tanjung Pandan |
| Bengkulu | Wita Ayu Aflida | 21 | 1.73 m (5 ft 8 in) | Bengkulu |
| Lampung | Shafira Bella Sukma | 19 | 1.73 m (5 ft 8 in) | Pringsewu |
JAKARTA SCR
| Jakarta SCR 1 | Aura Febryannisa | 23 | 1.70 m (5 ft 7 in) | Jakarta |
| Jakarta SCR 2 | Asti Wulan Adaninggar | 23 | 1.70 m (5 ft 7 in) | Jakarta |
| Jakarta SCR 3 | Mellisa Fortunita | 25 | 1.74 m (5 ft 9 in) | Jakarta |
| Jakarta SCR 4 | Jesslyn Lim | 25 | 1.80 m (5 ft 11 in) | Jakarta |
| Jakarta SCR 5 | Agnes Tifani | 22 | 1.78 m (5 ft 10 in) | Jakarta |
| Jakarta SCR 6 | Karina Fariza Ambrosini Basrewan | 21 | 1.72 m (5 ft 8 in) | Jakarta |
JAVA
| Banten | Vania Fitryanti Herlambang | 20 | 1.72 m (5 ft 8 in) | Tangerang |
| West Java | Tria Devitasari | 21 | 1.75 m (5 ft 9 in) | Garut |
| Central Java | Kidung Paramadita | 24 | 1.73 m (5 ft 8 in) | Kendal |
| SR Yogyakarta | Dilla Fadiela | 24 | 1.73 m (5 ft 8 in) | Yogyakarta |
| East Java | Alshya Sekar Amaranggana Wibowo | 20 | 1.76 m (5 ft 9 in) | Sidoarjo |
LESSER SUNDA ISLANDS
| Bali | Anak Agung Ayu Mirah Cynthia Dewi | 22 | 1.73 m (5 ft 8 in) | Denpasar |
| West Nusa Tenggara | Baiq Lukita Kirana Putri | 20 | 1.73 m (5 ft 8 in) | Mataram |
| East Nusa Tenggara | Melati Tabita Kirana Thei | 18 | 1.71 m (5 ft 7 in) | Kupang |
KALIMANTAN
| West Kalimantan | Wilda Octaviana Situngkir | 22 | 1.78 m (5 ft 10 in) | Pontianak |
| South Kalimantan | Putri Intan Kasela | 20 | 1.75 m (5 ft 9 in) | Martapura |
| Central Kalimantan | Episcia Puspita Lautt | 23 | 1.67 m (5 ft 6 in) | Palangkaraya |
| East Kalimantan | Cahaya Nur Hikmah | 21 | 1.71 m (5 ft 7 in) | Balikpapan |
| North Kalimantan | Desti Ayu Damayanti | 21 | 1.70 m (5 ft 7 in) | Tarakan |
SULAWESI
| South Sulawesi | Adlina Nadhilah Maharani | 22 | 1.72 m (5 ft 8 in) | Makassar |
| West Sulawesi | St. Humaerah Husnul Hotimah | 20 | 1.78 m (5 ft 10 in) | Mamuju |
| Southeast Sulawesi | Diviayu Catur Wulandari | 21 | 1.71 m (5 ft 7 1/2 in) | Kendari |
| Central Sulawesi | Sinar Wulandari Falembay | 22 | 1.75 m (5 ft 9 in) | Palu |
| North Sulawesi | Stevany Carolin Tanjaya | 24 | 1.72 m (5 ft 8 in) | Manado |
| Gorontalo | Stephanny Sutedjo | 19 | 1.71 m (5 ft 7 in) | Gorontalo |
EASTERN INDONESIA
| Maluku | Leinda Mellisa Wattimena | 19 | 1.74 m (5 ft 9 in) | Ambon |
| North Maluku | Fifiyana Yusuf | 20 | 1.70 m (5 ft 7 in) | Ternate |
| West Papua | Liberty Chelsea Anny Rumbruren | 24 | 1.75 m (5 ft 9 in) | Manokwari |
| Papua | Yuliana Pitornela Fotanaba | 22 | 1.72 m (5 ft 8 in) | Jayapura |

== Crossovers ==
Contestants who previously experienced in model/ambassador or beauty pageants:

- Aceh: Nandiya Deva Puspa Dewi was Smart Model Look 2015, Indonesian Model Aceh 2015 and (1st Runner-up) Indonesian Model HUNT 2015.
- Riau: Firsi Alda Feligia was Volleyball athlete.
- Riau Islands: Yessy Fouryana was (1st Runner-up) Indonesia Top Model Kota Batam.
- Jambi: Amalia Soleha Syaihu was Gadis Jambi 2013, Gadis Remaja Jambi 2012 and (Runner-up) Upik Sarolangun 2013.
- South Sumatra: Berliana Permatasari was (1st Runner-up) Putri Sriwijaya 2016.
- Bangka Belitung Islands: Sonia Fergina Citra was Top 10 Miss Oriental Tourism 2012 in Singapore, Putri Pariwisata Bangka Belitung 2010, Dayang Belitung 2007, Photogenic Dayang Bangka Belitung 2007, Model Mall Atrium in Style 2005, (1st Runner-up) Wajah Model Remaja Bangka Belitung 2005 and (2nd Runner-up) Wajah Model Remaja Jakarta 2005.
- Bengkulu: Wita Ayu Aflida was (1st Runner-up) Puteri Indonesia Bengkulu 2015.
- Lampung: Shafira Bella Sukma was Muli Mekhanai Pringsewu, Lampung 2017 and (Runner-up) Duta Museum Lampung 2017.
- Jakarta SCR 1: Aura Febryannisa was Best National Costume Miss Global Beauty Queen 2016 in Korea and (2nd Runner-up) Miss Earth Indonesia 2016.
- Jakarta SCR 2: Asti Wulan Adaninggar was Putri Batik Nusantara 2015, (1st Runner-up) Miss Earth Indonesia 2016, (Top 3) Putri Pariwisata Indonesia Jawa Tengah 2016 and (Top 10) Puteri Indonesia Jawa Tengah 2016.
- Jakarta SCR 5: Agnes Tifani was Miss Auto Show 2017.
- Banten: Vania Fitryanti Herlambang was Young Leaders for Indonesia Regional Wave 4.
- West Java: Tria Devitasari was Puteri Pariwisata Jawa Barat 2016 and Miss Chocolate Jawa Barat 2016.
- Central Java: Kidung Paramadita was (3rd Runner-up) Miss World Indonesia 2016 representing Lampung and Putra & Putri Kampus (Papika) Unnes 2012.
- Special Region of Yogyakarta: Dilla Fadiela was Wajah Femina-Busana Nasional Wajah Femina 2016 and Actor at Surga yang Tak Dirindukan.
- East Java: Alsya Sekar was Guk & Yuk Sidoarjo 2012.
- Bali: Anak Agung Ayu Mirah Cynthia was Duta Endek Kota Denpasar 2016
- West Nusa Tenggara: Baiq Kiky Kirana was Dedara Mataram 2016, Dedara Expresi 2014 and Puteri Bunga 2014.
- East Nusa Tenggara: Melati Kirana was Duta Wisata Indonesia NTT 2017 and Putri Pariwisata Kota Kupang 2016.
- West Kalimantan: Wilda Octaviana Situngkir was (Finalist) Miss Earth Indonesia 2017 and (1st Runner-up) Putri Pariwisata Kuburaya Kalimantan Barat.
- South Kalimantan: Putri Intan Kasela was Putri Kalimantan Selatan 2017.
- Central Kalimantan: Episcia Puspita Lautt was (3rd Runner-up) Putri Citra Indonesia 2017, Gita Puja Wyata, (1st Runner-up) Putri Pariwisata Kota Palangkaraya 2011 and (Finalist) Olimpiade Penelitian Siswa Indonesia 2010.
- East Kalimantan: Cahaya Nur Hikmah was Wajah Femina Model, Putri Dirgantara 2017, Busana Terbaik dalam Parade Busana Daerah se-Indonesia TMII 2015, (1st Runner-up) Putri Pariwisata Kalimantan Timur 2014 and Kalimantan Timur Delegation at Busana Daerah di Pekan Raya Bali 2012 - 2016.
- North Kalimantan: Desti Ayu Damayanti was Model Hijaber.
- South Sulawesi: Adlina Nadhilah was None Jakarta Barat 2015.
- Southeast Sulawesi: Diviayu Wulandari was Putri Pariwisata Sulawesi Tenggara 2017, (1st Runner-up) Putri Citra Indonesia 2015, (2nd Runner-up) Miss Coffee Indonesia 2017.
- Central Sulawesi: Sinar Wulandary Falembay was Paduan Suara Jambore Pemuda Indonesia dan ASEAN 2013, Duta IM3 Sulawesi Tengah 2013, Swimming Champion 850 meter Malang 2013, Top Model Palu 2012, Best Photogenic N2C Competition Modeling 2012, Marathon Champion Palu 2011, Duta Belia Sulawesi Tengah 2011, Paskibraka Sulawesi Tengah 2011 First Champion Volleyball Palu 2005, (1st Runner-up) Fashion Show Stik 2012, (2nd Runner-up) Mathematics Contest Palu 2005, (2nd Runner-up) CERPEN Festival 2004, (Top 10) Gading Model Search Female 2017 and (Top 10) Lady Rose Top Model 2017.
- North Sulawesi: Stevany Carolin was Nona Manado 2016.
- West Papua: Liberty Chelsea Anny Rumbruren was Wajah Femina Model 2017
- Papua: Yuliana Pitornella Fotanaba was Duta Muda ASEAN Papua 2017 (ASEAN Youth Ambassador of Papua).

== Post pageant notes ==
- Sonia Fergina Citra, Miss Universe Indonesia, was hailed as Top 20 semi-finalists on the Miss Universe 2018 held on December 17, 2018 at IMPACT Arena in Bangkok - Thailand.
- Vania Fitryanti Herlambang, Miss International Indonesia, was hailed as Top 15 semi-finalists at Miss International 2018 during the finals held on November 9, 2018 at the Tokyo Dome City Hall in Tokyo - Japan.
- Wilda Octaviana Situngkir, Miss Supranational Indonesia, was hailed as 3rd Runner-up at Miss Supranational 2018 was held on December 7, 2018 at Hala MOSiR in Krynica-Zdrój - Poland.
