= Kevin Lilliana =

Indonesian beauty pageant titleholder (born 1996)

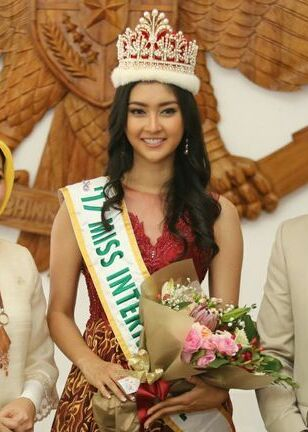
- Lilliana in 2017
- Born: 5 January 1996 (age 30); Bandung, Indonesia
- Education: Maranatha Christian University; PPM School of Management
- Height: 1.78 m (5 ft 10 in)
- Spouse: Oskar Mahendra (m. 2020)
- Children: 2
- Beauty pageant titleholder
- Title: Puteri Indonesia Jawa Barat 2017; Puteri Indonesia Lingkungan 2017; Miss International 2017
- Major competitions: Puteri Indonesia Jawa Barat 2017; (Winner); Puteri Indonesia 2017; (1st Runner-up – Puteri Indonesia Lingkungan); (Best Traditional Costume); Miss International 2017; (Winner); (Miss Best Dresser)

Signature
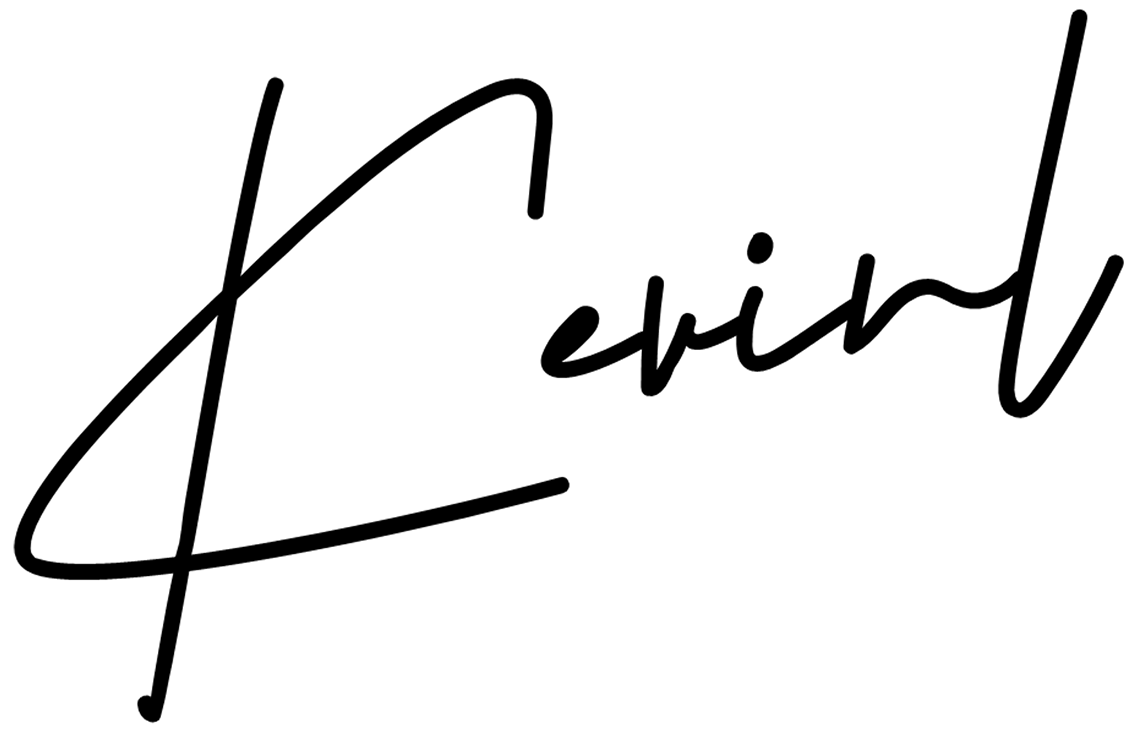

Kevin Lilliana Junaedy (born 5 January 1996) is an Indonesian beauty pageant titleholder who won Miss International 2017. She is the first Indonesian and Muslim woman to win Miss International, and was the first to win one of the four major international pageants for Indonesia. Prior to winning Miss International, she joined Puteri Indonesia 2017 and finished as the First Runner-up as well as winning Puteri Indonesia Lingkungan title.

== Early life and career ==
Lilliana was born on 5 January 1996 in Bandung, to a Chinese-Indonesian father Eddie Foe Junaedy and Sundanese mother, Lina Yulianti. Lilliana is the eldest of two siblings. Graduated in 2017, she holds a bachelor degree in interior design from the Faculty of Arts and Design of Maranatha Christian University.

On February 2, 2020, Lilliana married singer and entertainment producer, Oskar Mahendra. They have two children, and Mahendra has a daughter from a previous relationship.

== Pageantry ==
=== Puteri Indonesia 2017 ===
Lillian entered and won Puteri Indonesia West Java 2017, subsequently competing in Puteri Indonesia 2017. During finals night on March 31, 2017 held in Jakarta Convention Center, she won the title of Puteri Indonesia Lingkungan, in addition she also won Best Traditional Costume and was first runner-up for Miss Talent.

=== Miss International 2017 ===
As the winner of Puteri Indonesia Lingkungan 2017, Lilliana represented Indonesia at Miss International 2017, held in the Tokyo Dome City Hall in Tokyo, Japan on November 14, 2017, and was crowned at the end of the competition by her predecessor, Miss International 2016 Kylie Verzosa from the Philippines.

In addition to winning the crown, she also won the Miss Best Dresser special award. She wore a national costume called "Mbok Jamu Gendong and the Ancient Secret Potion" inspired by Indonesia's traditional herbal-medicine Jamu. Her achievement also marked Indonesia's first win at one of the famed Big Four international beauty pageants.

During the final round of speech portion of the pageant, each finalist were given a chance to express their plans if crowned Miss International and share their personal advocacies. Lilliana's speech read:

Bhinneka Tunggal Ika, Indonesia's national motto that means 'Unity in Diversity'. Indonesia is one of the few countries that has such a diversity of cultures, languages and beliefs. That is why I am a big believer in unity in diversity. This world is a beautiful place because of its wide variety, not similarities, and if I become Miss International I will spread these positive values and spread the culture of accepting and respecting differences, because I know that every country has their own cultures, character and identities. Therefore, let's create a perfect solution by learning, understand and appreciating each other.

On November 9, 2018, she crowned her successor Mariem Velazco from Venezuela as Miss International 2018 in Tokyo, Japan.

Awards and achievements
| Preceded by Philippines – Kylie Verzosa | Miss International; 2017 | Succeeded by Venezuela – Mariem Velazco |
| Preceded by Felicia Hwang Yi Xin (Lampung) | Puteri Indonesia Lingkungan; 2017 | Succeeded by Vania Fitryanti Herlambang (Banten) |
| Preceded by Evan Lysandra | Puteri West Java; 2017 | Succeeded by Tria Devitasari |
