= Memedi =

Memedi is a surname. Notable people with the surname include:

- Abdula Memedi (born 1952), Yugoslav wrestler
- Nazif Memedi (born 1956), Croatian politician of Romani ethnicity
- Nedžmedin Memedi (born 1966), Albanian football midfielder
