= Mariem Velazco =

Venezuelan beauty pageant

- Born: Venezuela
- Height: 1.78 m (5 ft 10 in)
- Beauty pageant titleholder
- Title: Miss Barinas 2017; Miss Venezuela International 2017; Miss International 2018
- Hair color: Dark brown
- Eye color: Light brown
- Major competitions: Miss Venezuela 2017; (Miss Venezuela International 2017); (Best Style); (Miss Photogenic); Miss International 2018; (Winner)

Mariem Claret Velazco García is a Venezuelan beauty pageant titleholder who won Miss International 2018 in Tokyo, Japan.

== Pageantry ==
=== Miss Venezuela 2017 ===
Velazco stands at 177 centimeters and competed as Miss Barinas 2017. As one of 24 finalists in her country's national competition, she was awarded Best Style and Miss Photogenic at the grand final show of Miss Venezuela 2017. She succeeded outgoing Miss Venezuela 2016 first runner-up and Miss International 2017 second runner-up Diana Croce of Nueva Esparta.

=== Miss International 2018 ===
Velazco was crowned Miss International 2018 by her predecessor, Kevin Lilliana Junaedy of Indonesia, at the Tokyo Dome City Hall in Tokyo, Japan on 9 November 2018. She showcased a Venezuelan native headdress and an evening gown composed of pearls during her competition.

Her win gave Venezuela its eighth Miss International crown, the most number of crown titles won by a single country at this pageant. She was preceded and succeeded by Southeast Asian delegates.

Awards and achievements
Preceded by (Indonesia) Kevin Lilliana	Miss International; 2018	Succeeded by (Thailand) Sireethorn Leearamwat
Preceded by Diana Croce, Nueva Esparta	Miss Venezuela International; 2018	Succeeded by Melissa Jiménez, Zulia
Preceded by Jelaning Fargas	Miss Barinas; 2017	Succeeded by Kelly Mejías
