= Puteri Indonesia Pariwisata =

Title granted by Puteri Indonesia beauty pageant

- Logo of the Puteri Indonesia org.
- Formation: 2006; 20 years ago
- Type: Beauty pageant
- Headquarters: Jakarta
- Location: Indonesia
- Official language: Indonesian and English
- President and CEO: The Royal Highest Princess Mooryati Soedibyo of Surakarta Sunanate
- Chairperson: The Royal Highest Princess Putri Kuswisnuwardhani of Surakarta Sunanate
- Parent organization: Puteri Indonesia Charities, Inc.
- Affiliations: The Royal Highest Family of Surakarta Sunanate; Mustika Ratu
- Budget: US$100 million (annually)
- Website: www.puteri-indonesia.com

Puteri Indonesia Pariwisata (Javanese: (Hanacaraka) ꦦꦸꦠꦺꦫꦶꦆꦤ꧀ꦢꦺꦴꦤꦺꦱꦦꦫꦶꦮꦶꦱꦠ; literally translates into: "Tourism Princess of Indonesia") is one of the titles granted by the Puteri Indonesia beauty pageant. The titleholders of Puteri Indonesia Pariwisata represent Indonesia in the international beauty pageants. The president-owner of Puteri Indonesia Pariwisata are The Royal Highest Family of Surakarta Sunanate, Princess Mooryati Soedibyo and Princess Putri Kuswisnuwardhani. Puteri Indonesia Pariwisata is traditionally crowned in March, alongside the celebration of International Women's Day.

The reigning Puteri Indonesia Pariwisata 2025 is Salma Ranggita Cahyariyani of South Sumatra, who was crowned on 2 May 2025 in Jakarta Convention Center.

== History ==
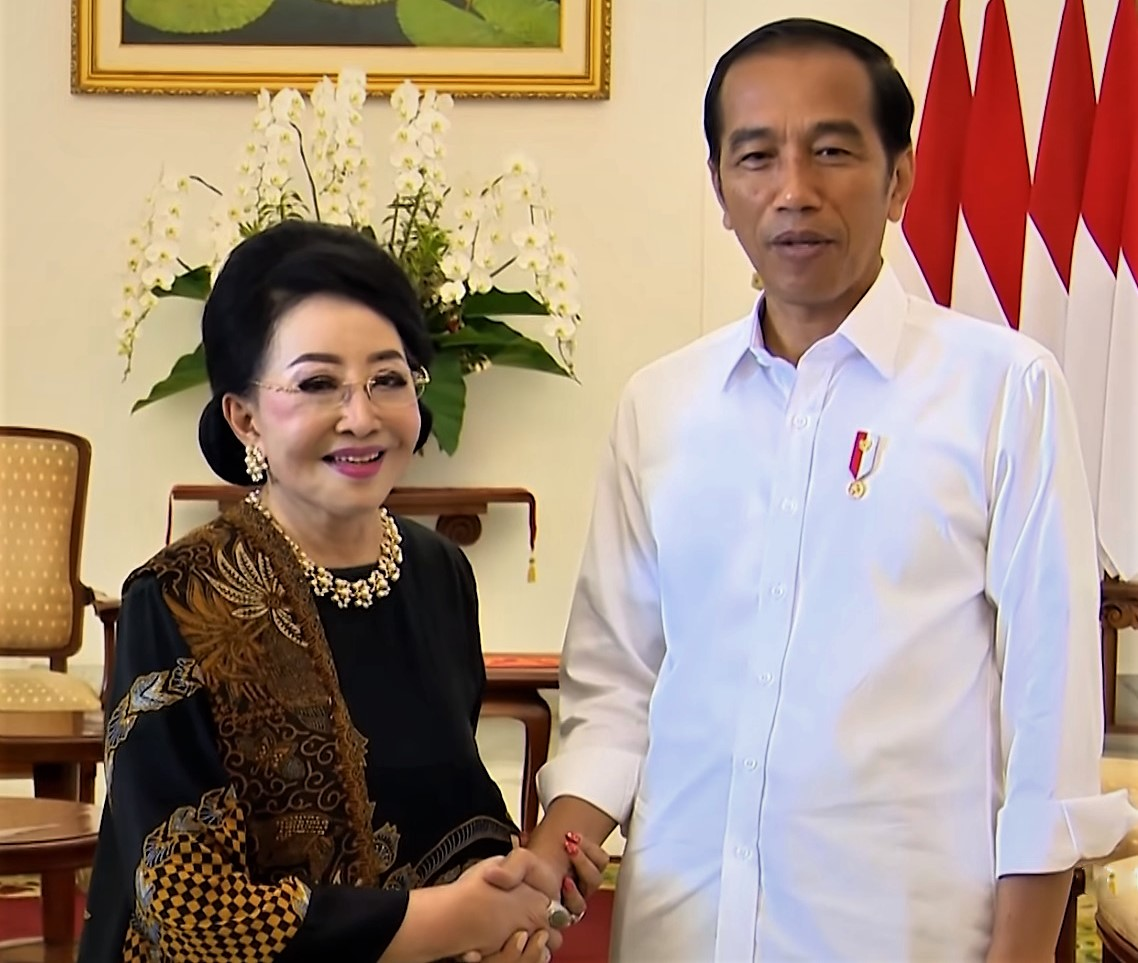
The president and CEO of Puteri Indonesia Org., The Royal Highest Princess Mooryati Soedibyo of Surakarta Sunanate, meeting with President Joko Widodo in Bogor Presidential Palace.

Since 2006, 2nd Runner-up of Puteri Indonesia was given the Puteri Indonesia Pariwisata. Puteri Indonesia Pariwisata was started to choose the winner for Miss International 2007. After that, Puteri Indonesia Organization did not send Puteri Indonesia Pariwisata to international pageant. Started Puteri Indonesia 2010, the titleholders was sent to the International Beauty pageants, started with Alessandra Khadijah Usman at the Miss Asia Pacific World 2011 in Chile, following with Andi Tenri Gusti Harnum Utari Natassa was competed at the Miss Asia Pacific World 2012 in South Korea.

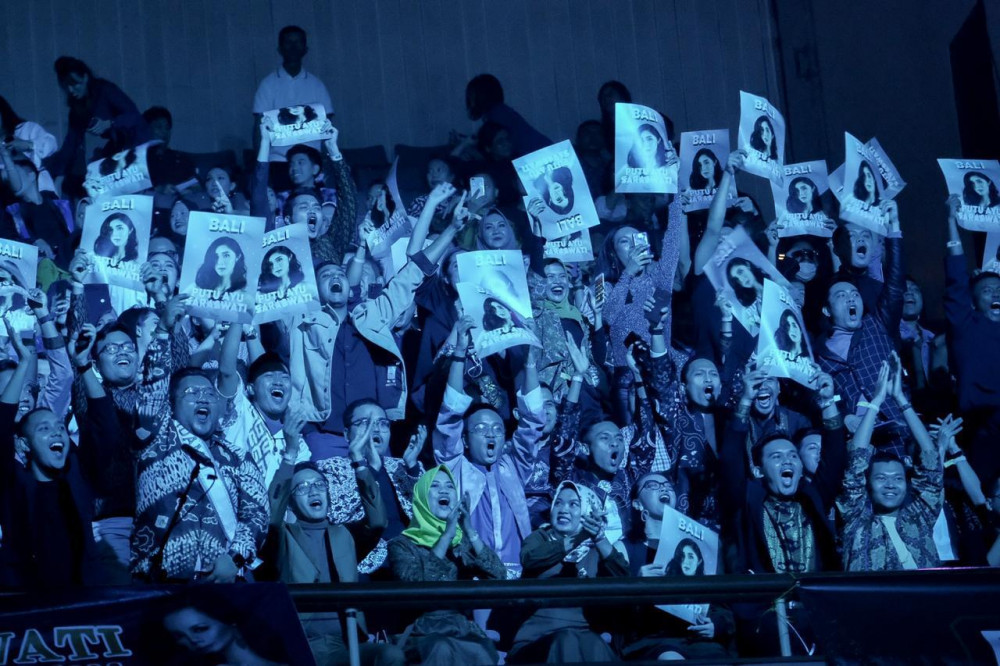
"Indonesian Pageant-Lover" gave their support as the candidates competed on the Puteri Indonesia final coronation night.

The first Puteri Indonesia Pariwisata to compete in Miss Supranational was Cokorda Istri Krisnanda Widani from Bali in 2013.

In 2019, Joko Widodo announced the Puteri Indonesia as "National Intangible Cultural Heritage of Indonesia", which carries the values of Indonesian culture and society togetherness, to celebrate the role of women in the creative industry, environment, tourism, education and social awareness. In line with that, Angela Tanoesoedibjo the eldest daughter of media magnate MNC Group Hary Tanoesoedibjo and Miss Indonesia President and chief executive officer Liliana Tanaja Tanoesoedibjo chosen as The Deputy of Ministry of tourism and Creative Economy of The Republic of Indonesia by the President of Indonesia, Joko Widodo at the Istana Negara Palace in Central Jakarta. Starting 2024, the titleholder of Puteri Indonesia Pariwisata will compete in an international beauty pageant that is decided by the Puteri Indonesia organization after the competition ends.

== Winners ==
The oldest woman to win Puteri Indonesia Pariwisata is Puteri Indonesia Pariwisata 2017, Karina Nadila Niab of East Nusa Tenggara, at 24 years old, 7 months and 10 days, while the youngest woman to win Puteri Indonesia Pariwisata is Puteri Indonesia Pariwisata 2011, Andi Tenri Gusti Harnum Utari Natassa of South Sulawesi, at 19 years old, 1 month and 26 days. The tallest Puteri Indonesia Pariwisata is Puteri Indonesia Pariwisata 2018, Wilda Octaviana Situngkir, of West Kalimantan at 5 feet and 10-inch (178 cm).

Many Puteri Indonesia Pariwisata winners have gone to pursue careers in the entertainment industry. Those who have been successful in the industry include Alessandra Khadijah Usman, Gresya Amanda Maaliwuga, Intan Aletrinö, Karina Nadila Niab, Wilda Octaviana Situngkir, Jihane Almira Chedid and Adinda Cresheilla

== Gallery of winners ==
The winners of Puteri Indonesia Pariwisata

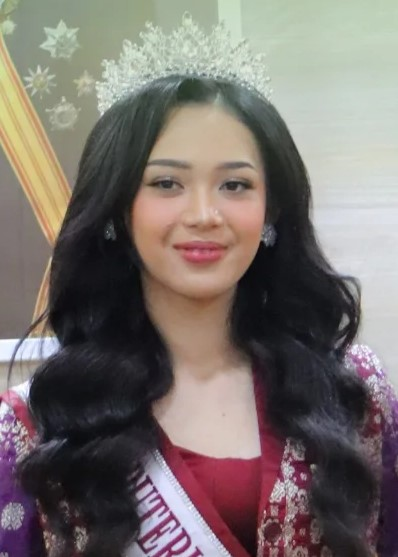
Puteri Indonesia Pariwisata 2025
Salma Ranggita Cahyariyani

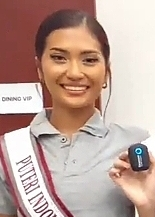
Puteri Indonesia Pariwisata 2024 & Miss Cosmo 2024
Ketut Permata Juliastrid Sari

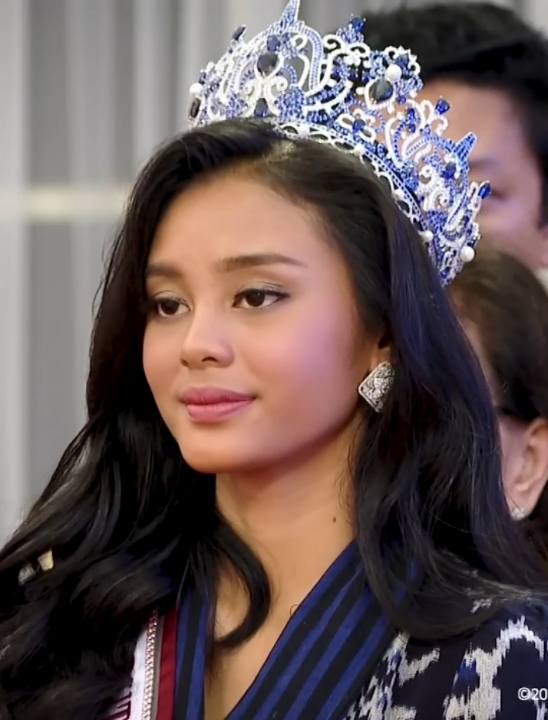
Puteri Indonesia Pariwisata 2023
Lulu Zaharani Krisna Widodo

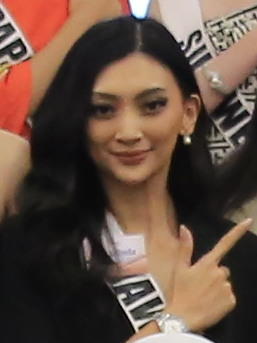
Puteri Indonesia Pariwisata 2022
Adinda Cresheilla

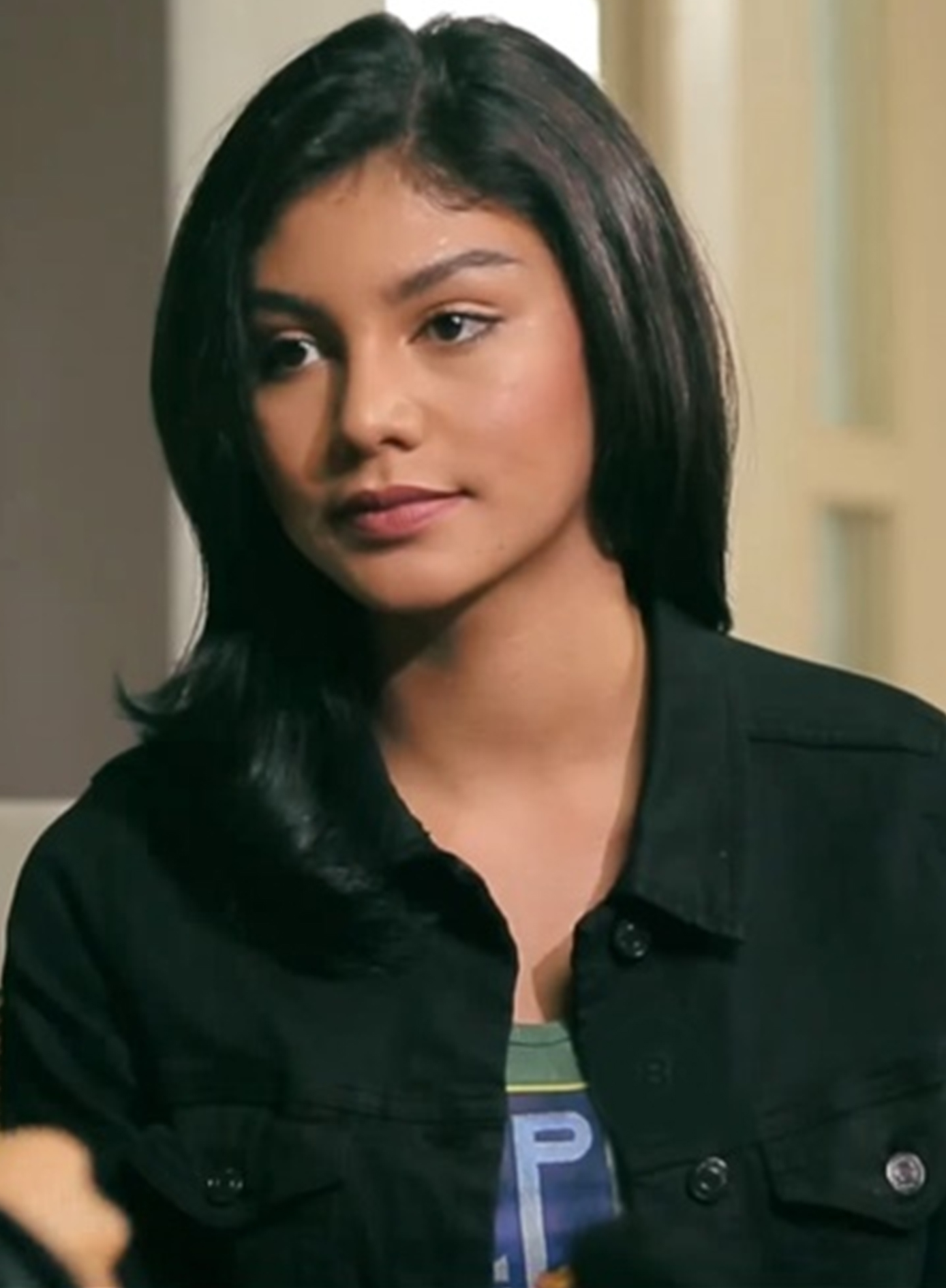
Puteri Indonesia Pariwisata 2020-2021
Jihane Almira Chedid

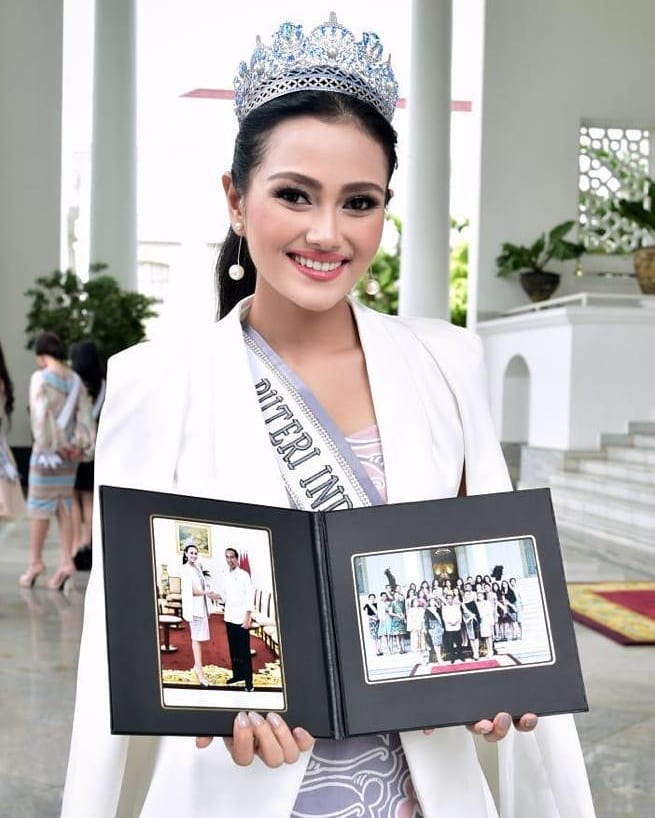
Puteri Indonesia Pariwisata 2019
Jesica Fitriana Martasari

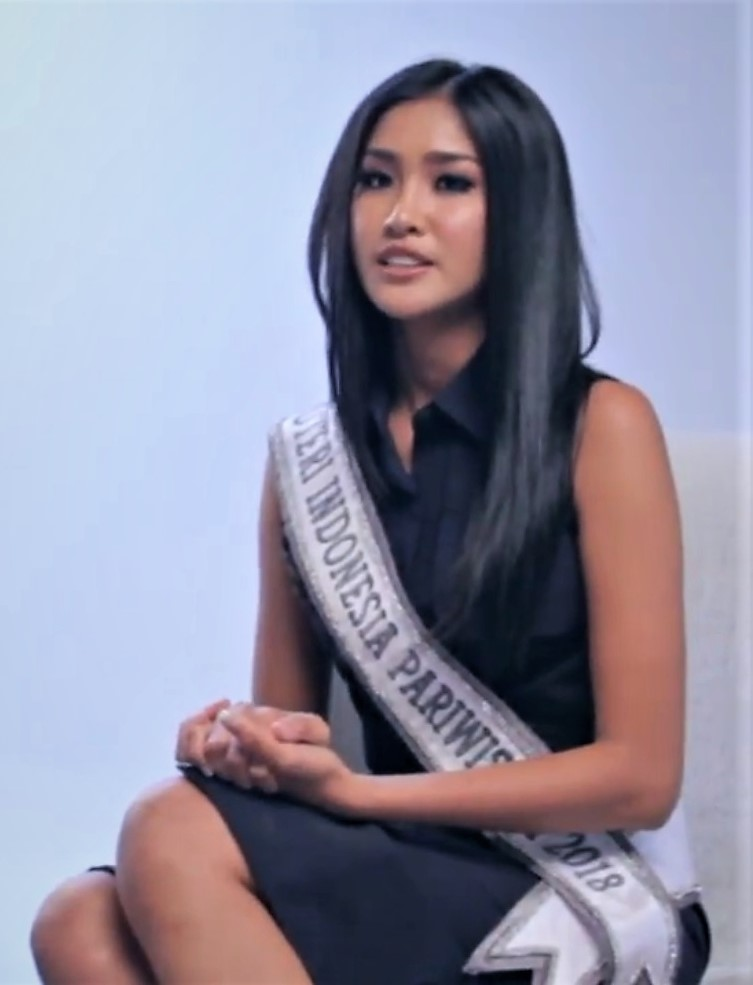
Puteri Indonesia Pariwisata 2018
Wilda Octaviana Situngkir

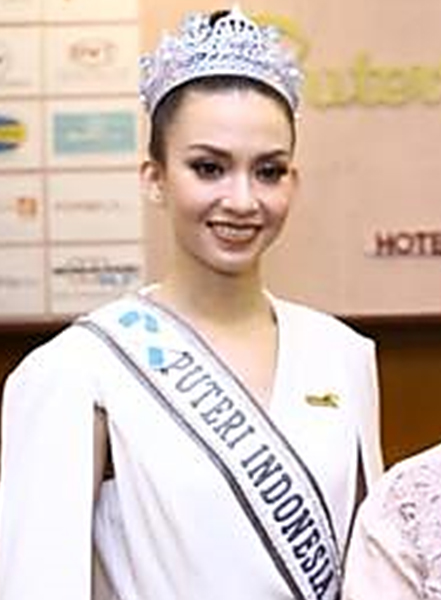
Puteri Indonesia Pariwisata 2017
Karina Nadila Niab

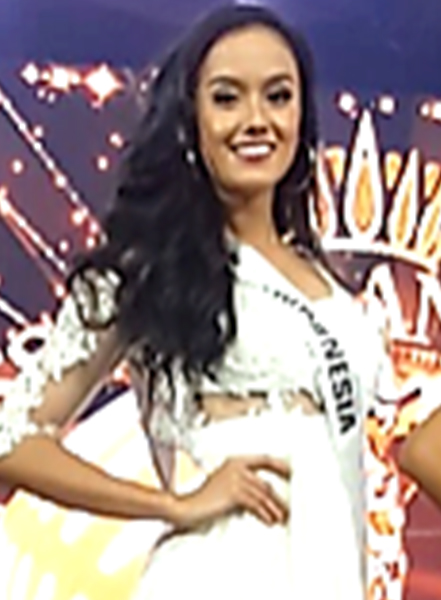
Puteri Indonesia Pariwisata 2016
Intan Aletrinö

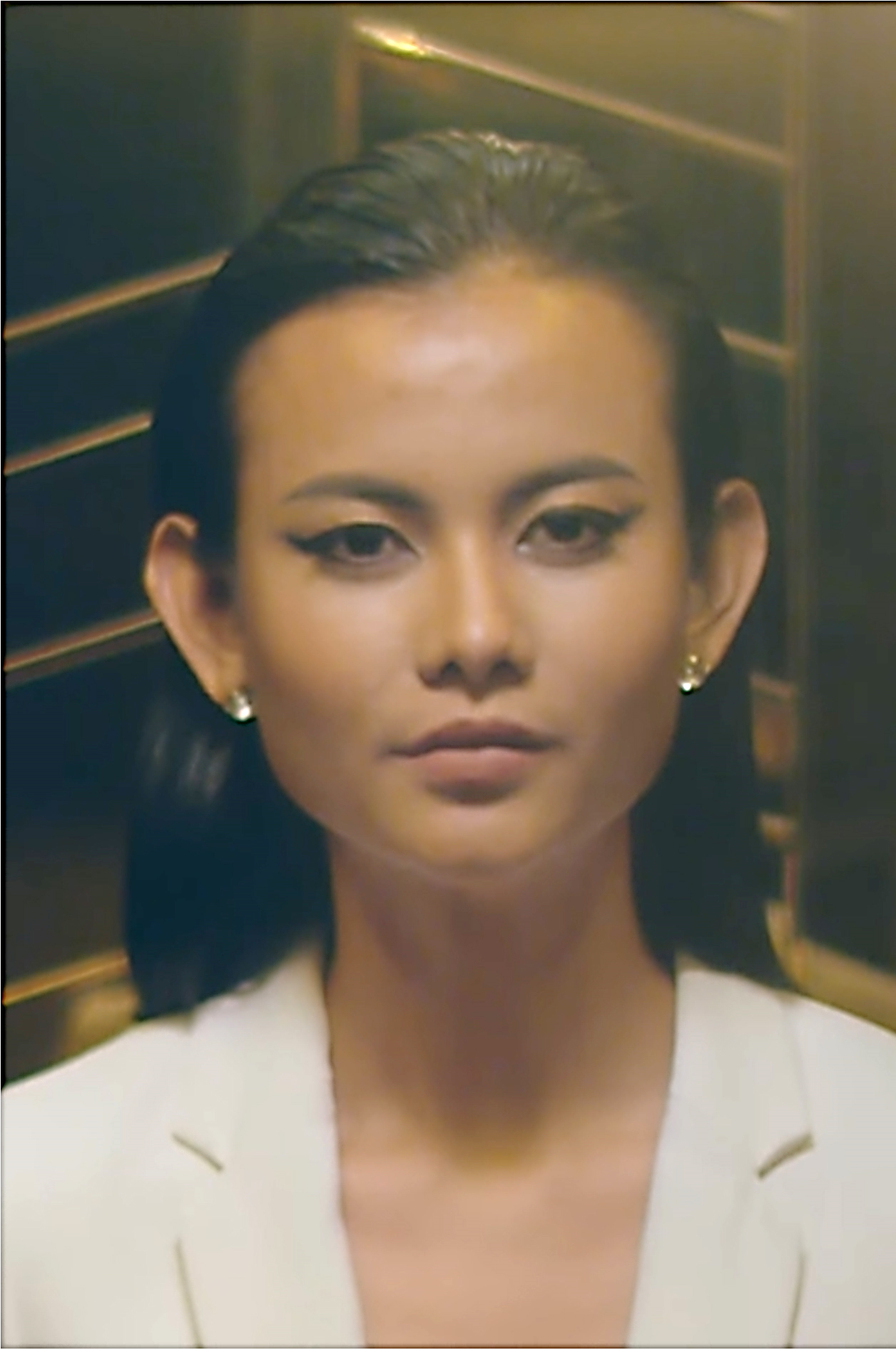
Puteri Indonesia Pariwisata 2015
Gresya Amanda Maaliwuga

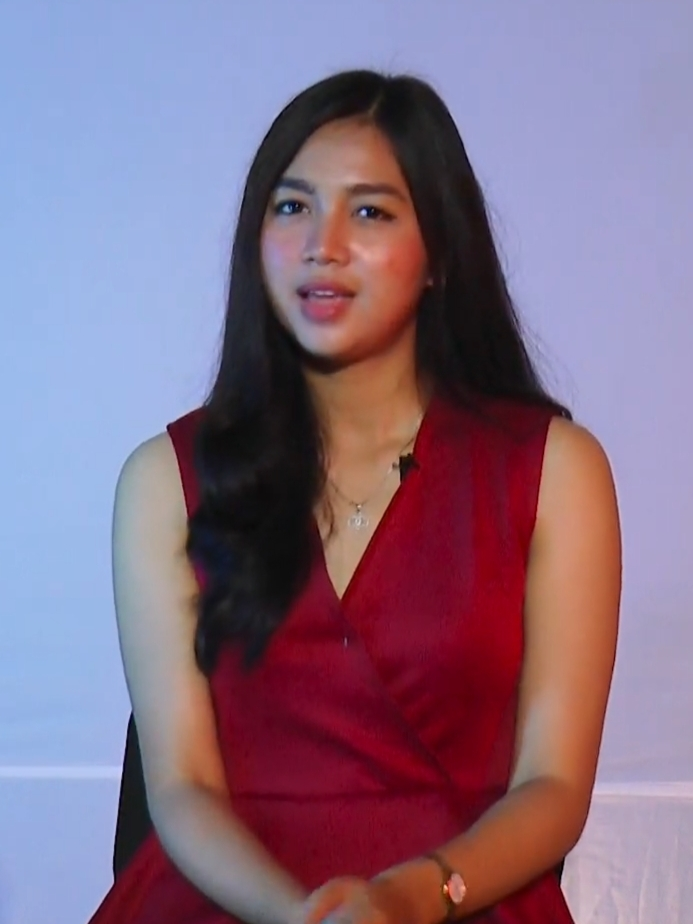
Puteri Indonesia Pariwisata 2014
Lily Estelita Liana

== Titleholders ==
This is a list of women who have the title of Puteri Indonesia Pariwisata.

| Year | Province | Puteri Indonesia Pariwisata | International Pageant | Placement | Special Awards | Notes |
|---|---|---|---|---|---|---|
| 2006 | Jakarta SCR 5 | Rahma Landy Sjahruddin | Miss International 2007 | Top 15 | | The first and the only "Puteri Indonesia Pariwisata" competed at Miss International |
| 2007 | Jakarta SCR 4 | Ika Fiyonda Putri | Miss Asia Pacific 2008 | Contest canceled | | |
| 2008 | DI Yogyakarta | Anggi Mahesti | Miss Asia Pacific 2009 | Contest canceled | | |
| 2009 | North Maluku | Isti Ayu Pratiwi | Miss Asia Pacific 2010 | Contest canceled | | |
| 2010 | Gorontalo | Alessandra Khadijah Usman | Miss Asia Pacific World 2011 | 1st Runner-up | Best Style Dress Award | |
| 2011 | South Sulawesi | Andi Tenri Gusti Harnum Utari Natassa | Miss Asia Pacific World 2012 | Top 15 | Best National Costume; Best Talent (2nd Runner-up) | |
| 2013 | Bali | Cokorda Istri Krisnanda Widani | Miss Supranational 2013 | 3rd Runner-up | | The first "Puteri Indonesia Pariwisata" competed at Miss Suprational |
| 2014 | DI Yogyakarta | Lily Estelita Liana | Miss Supranational 2014 | Unplaced | Best National Costume | |
| 2015 | North Sulawesi | Gresya Amanda Maaliwuga | Miss Supranational 2015 | Unplaced | Best National Costume; Best Evening Gown (Top 10) | |
| 2016 | West Sumatra | Intan Aletrinö | Miss Supranational 2016 | Top 10 | Miss Multimedia Award; Miss Popularity; Miss Elegance | |
| 2017 | East Nusa Tenggara | Karina Nadila Niab | Miss Supranational 2017 | Top 25 | Miss Popularity; Best in Evening Gown | |
| 2018 | West Kalimantan | Wilda Octaviana Situngkir | Miss Supranational 2018 | 3rd Runner-up | Best National Costume; Miss Supra Model of Asia; Miss Popularity; Miss Global Beauties Choice; Sponsor – Beautiful Piece of Jewelry Winner; Royal Dinner Winner; Pre-Arrival (Top 5); Photoshoot with Raymond Saldana (top 10) | |
| 2019 | West Java | Jesica Fitriana Martasari | Miss Supranational 2019 | 2nd Runner-up | Supra Fan Vote Winner; Women of Substance; Best National Costume (2nd Runner-up) | |
| 2020 | Central Java | Jihane Almira Chedid | Miss Supranational 2021 | Top 12 | Miss Supranational Asia; Miss Congeniality; Best National Costume; Supra Fan-Vote Winner; Supra Chat Winner Group 4; Supra Fan-Vote (Top 10); Miss Elegance (Top 11) | |
| 2022 | East Java | Adinda Cresheilla | Miss Supranational 2022 | 3rd Runner-up | Supra Chat Winner; Best Talent (Top 6); Supra Fan-Vote (Top 10); Supra Model of the Year (Top 11); Miss Elegance (Top 15); Miss Supra Influencer (Top 42) | |
| 2023 | Lampung | Lulu Zaharani Krisna Widodo | Miss Charm 2024 | Withdrew | | |
| 2024 | Bali | Ketut Permata Juliastrid Sari | Miss Cosmo 2024 | Miss Cosmo 2024 | Cosmo Beauty Icon | |
| 2025 | South Sumatra | Salma Ranggita Cahyariyani | Miss Cosmo 2025 | Top 21 | | |
| 2026 | Jakarta SCR 3 | Karina Moudy Widodo | Miss Cosmo 2026 | TBA | TBA | TBA |

=== Number of wins by Province ===
| Province | Titles | Year(s) |
|---|---|---|
| Jakarta | 3 | 2006, 2007, 2026 |
| Bali | 2 | 2013, 2024 |
| Yogyakarta SR | 2 | 2008, 2014 |
| South Sumatra | 1 | 2025 |
| Lampung | 1 | 2023 |
| East Java | 1 | 2022 |
| Central Java | 1 | 2020 |
| West Java | 1 | 2019 |
| West Kalimantan | 1 | 2018 |
| East Nusa Tenggara | 1 | 2017 |
| West Sumatra | 1 | 2016 |
| North Sulawesi | 1 | 2015 |
| South Sulawesi | 1 | 2011 |
| Gorontalo | 1 | 2010 |
| North Maluku | 1 | 2009 |

== Crossovers to other international pageants ==
| Name | Competition | Placement |
|---|---|---|
| Jihane Almira Chedid | Guess Girl Search South East Asia 2015 | Top 15 |
| Jihane Almira Chedid | Nylon Magazine Face Off 2016 | Top 10 |

== Puteri Indonesia Pariwisata's Placement at International Pageants ==
=== Miss Supranational ===
| Name of Pageant | Winner | 2nd Runner-Up | 3rd Runner-Up | Top 10–12 | Top 15–25 | Total Placements |
|---|---|---|---|---|---|---|
| Miss Supranational | - | 2019 | 2013 • 2018 • 2022 | 2016 • 2021 | 2017 | 7 |
| Total | - | (1) 2nd Runner-up | (3) 3nd Runner-up | (2) Finalist | (1) Semi-finalist | 7 |

=== Miss International ===
| Name of Pageant | Winner | Top 15 | Total Placements |
|---|---|---|---|
| Miss International | - | 2007 | 1 |
| Total | - | (1) Semi-finalist | 1 |

=== Miss Asia Pacific World ===
| Miss Asia Pacific World | Winner | 1st Runner-Up | Top 15 | Total Placements |
|---|---|---|---|---|
| Miss Asia Pacific World | - | 2011 | 2012 | 2 |
| Total | - | (1) 1st Runner-up | (1) Finalist | 2 |

== See also ==
- Puteri Indonesia
- Puteri Indonesia Lingkungan
- Puteri Indonesia Pariwisata (in Bahasa Indonesia)
- Miss Supranational
- List of Miss Indonesia International

== Notes ==
- Jihane Almira Chedid competed in Guess Girl Search South East Asia 2015 where she placed in Top 15, together with Puteri Indonesia 2017 alumni, Bunga Jelitha as the winner. She is also placed in Top 10 Nylon Magazine Face Off 2016.
