= Hala MOSiR =

Indoor arena in Łódź, Poland

Coordinates: 51°44′57″N 19°27′6″E

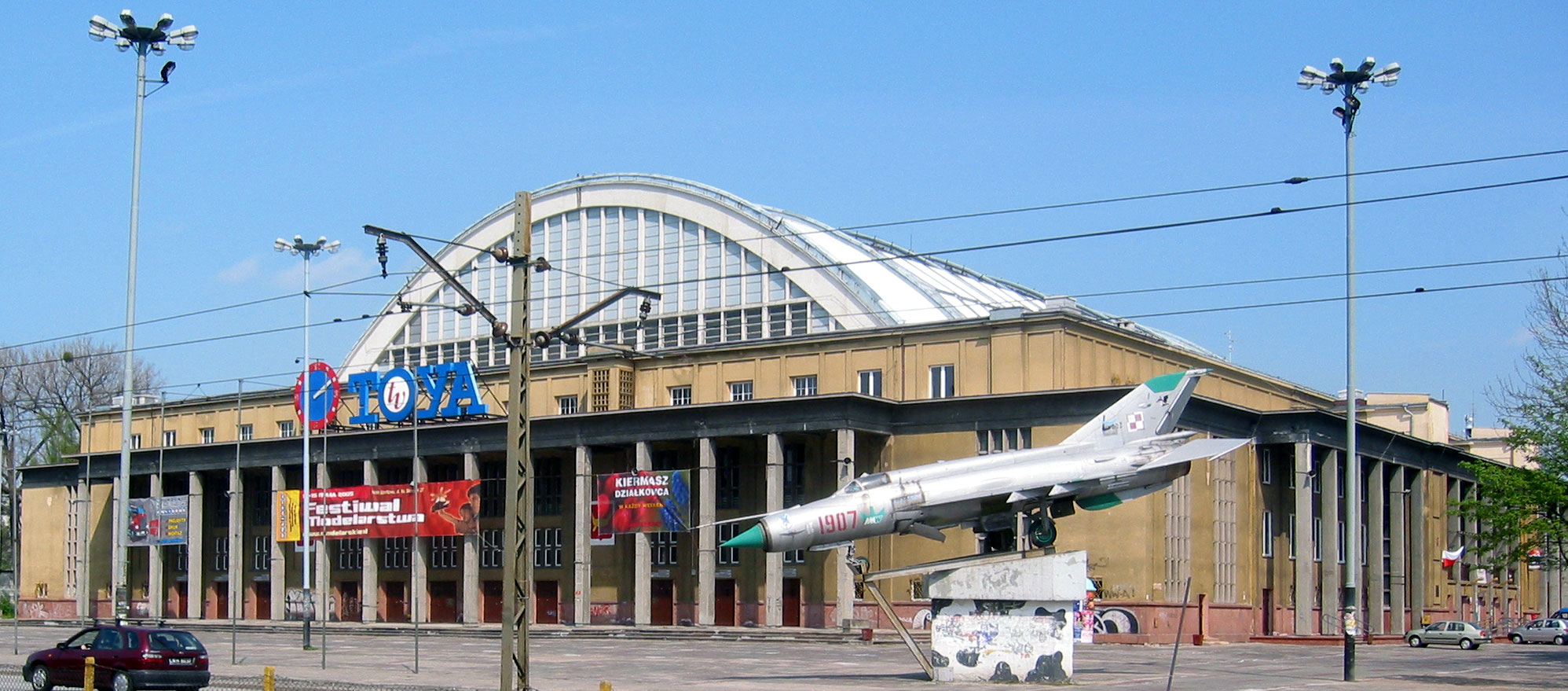

Hala MOSiR (acronym for Miejskiego Ośrodka Sportu i Rekreacji) is an indoor arena in Łódź, Poland. It is mainly used for basketball and volleyball and has a seating capacity for 6,710 people. Sometimes it also use for Pageant arena for Miss Supranational and Mister Supranational that was held with over 70 participant from around the world.

Events and tenants
Preceded by Ice Palace; Moscow	CEV Champions League; Final Venue; 2008	Succeeded by O2 Arena; Prague
