= Puteri Indonesia 2017 =

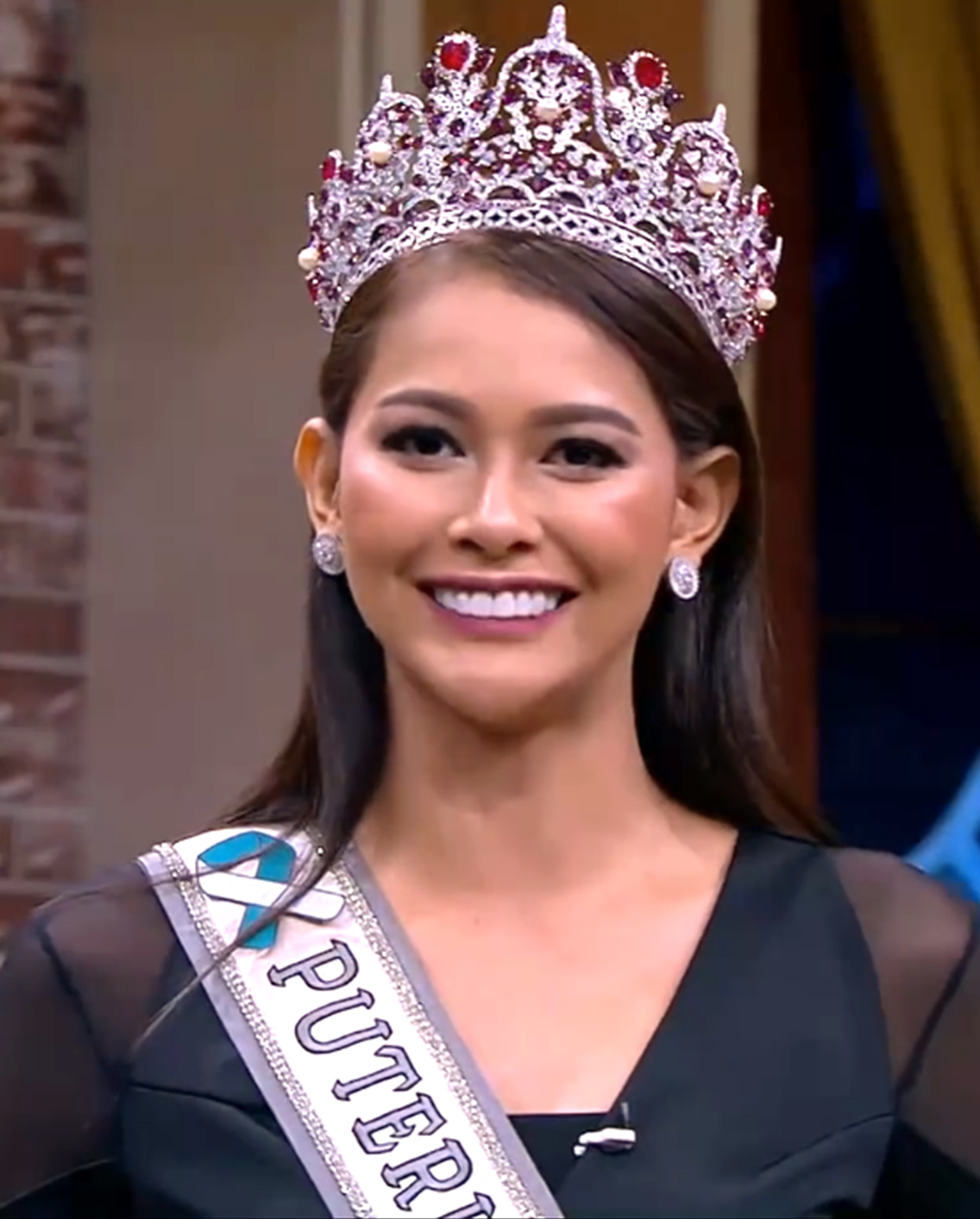
- Bunga Jelitha Ibrani
- Date: March 31, 2017
- Presenters: Choky Sitohang, Zivanna Letisha
- Entertainment: Ungu, Anji, Marcell Siahaan, Cakra Khan, Andien, Trio Libero, DARR2, Daniel Powter (Guest Star)
- Theme: The Sophisticated of the Baliland
- Venue: Jakarta Convention Center, Jakarta, Indonesia
- Broadcaster: Indosiar; YouTube; Vidio for Android
- Entrants: 38
- Placements: 11
- Withdrawals: Central Kalimantan
- Winner: Bunga Jelitha; Jakarta Special Capital Region 5
- Congeniality: Suci Marliani; Jakarta Special Capital Region 4

Puteri Indonesia 2017, the 21st Puteri Indonesia pageant was held on March 31, 2017, at Jakarta Convention Center, Jakarta. Kezia Warouw, Puteri Indonesia 2016 of North Sulawesi crowned her successor Bunga Jelitha of Jakarta Special Capital Region 5 at the end of the event. All 38 contestants from 33 provinces competed for the crown. The winner will represent Indonesia at the Miss Universe 2017, while the runners-up will compete at the Miss International 2017, Miss Supranational 2017, and Miss Grand International 2017. Miss Universe 2016 Iris Mittenaere of France and Miss Grand International 2016 Ariska Putri Pertiwi of Indonesia attend at the Grand Final Show. Miss Universe 2005 Natalie Glebova of Canada also attended the show as a judge.

Kevin Liliana became the first Indonesian to win Miss International.

== Results ==
=== Main ===
The Crowns of Puteri Indonesia Title Holders

Puteri Indonesia 2017 (Miss Universe Indonesia 2017)
Puteri Indonesia Lingkungan 2017 (Miss International Indonesia 2017)
Puteri Indonesia Pariwisata 2017 (Miss Supranational Indonesia 2017)
Puteri Indonesia Perdamaian 2017 (Miss Grand Indonesia 2017)

Final Results	Contestant	International Placement
Puteri Indonesia 2017 (Miss Universe Indonesia)	Jakarta SCR 5: Bunga Jelitha Ibrani	Unplaced – Miss Universe 2017
Puteri Indonesia Lingkungan 2017 (Miss International Indonesia)	West Java: Kevin Lilliana Junaedy	WINNER – Miss International 2017
Puteri Indonesia Pariwisata 2017 (Miss Supranational Indonesia)	East Nusa Tenggara: Karina Nadila Niab	Top 25 – Miss Supranational 2017
Puteri Indonesia Perdamaian 2017 (Miss Grand Indonesia)	Central Java: Dea Goesti Rizkita Koswara	Top 10 – Miss Grand International 2017
Top 6	4th Runner-up Jambi - Syella Afsari; 5th Runner-up North Sumatra - Putri Mentari Sitanggang θ	
Top 11	West Sumatra: Puji Chegana §; South Sumatra: Nur Harisyah Pertiwi; Jakarta SCR 2: Dita Fakhrana Utami; East Kalimantan: Gituen Miracline Samantha; Papua: Fredrika Mitra Munua	

§ Voted into the Top 11 by viewers
θ Voted into the Top 6 by viewers

==== Order Announcements ====
- Bold: Winner of Puteri Indonesia
- Italic: 1st-3rd Runner Up

=== Top 11 ===
- Jakarta SCR 2
- Papua
- Central Java
- Jambi
- West Java
- East Kalimantan
- East Nusa Tenggara
- South Sumatera
- West Sumatera
- **Jakarta SCR 5**
- North Sumatera §

=== Top 6 ===
- **Jakarta SCR 5**
- West Java
- East Nusa Tenggara
- Central Java
- Jambi
- North Sumatera **θ**

=== Top 4 ===
announce after the show, declaring Miss Central Java as Miss Grand Indonesia

- Central Java

=== Top 3 ===
- West Java
- East Nusa Tenggara
- **Jakarta SCR 5**

Central Java was declared as 3rd Runner up (Miss Grand Indonesia)

=== Special Award ===
Title	Contestant
**Puteri Indonesia Persahabatan** (Miss Congeniality)	**Jakarta SCR 4** - Suci Marliani
**Puteri Indonesia Berbakat** (Miss Talent)	**North Maluku** - Sarjia Samin Ibrahim (winner); **West Java** - Kevin Lilliana; **Southeast Sulawesi** - Dayu Putu Mirawati
**Puteri Indonesia Intelegensia** (Miss Intelligence)	**1.** **Jakarta SCR 4** - Suci Marliani; **2.** **Riau** - Astari Aslam; **3.** **Jakarta SCR 1** - Karina Nandia Saputri
**Best Traditional Costume**	**West Java** - Kevin Lilliana (winner); **South Sumatra** - Puji Chegana; **Jakarta SCR 2** - Dita Fakhrana Utami

=== Puteri Indonesia Kepulauan ===
Favorite Contestant by votes on Instagram from each group Island:

Title	Contestant
**Puteri Indonesia Sumatera** (Princess of Sumatra)	**Aceh** - Yayang Ayu Lestari Ningsih
**Puteri Indonesia Jawa** (Princess of Java)	**East Java** - Fatma Ayu Husnasari
**Puteri Indonesia Nusa-Bali** (Princess of Lesser Sunda Islands)	**East Nusa Tenggara** - Karina Nadila Niab
**Puteri Indonesia Kalimantan** (Princess of Kalimantan)	**South Kalimantan** - Suci Hastini
**Puteri Indonesia Sulawesi** (Princess of Sulawesi)	**South Sulawesi** - Nur Fitriyani
**Puteri Indonesia Timur** (Princess of Eastern Indonesia)	**West Papua** - Leidy Herlin Rumbiak

== Contestants ==
38 Contestants have been confirmed. The information from Puteri Indonesia Official website.

Province	Name	Age	Height	Hometown
SUMATRA
Aceh	Yayang Ayu Lestari Ningsih	23	1.70 m (5 ft 7 in)	Banda Aceh
North Sumatra	Putri Mentari Sitanggang	21	1.70 m (5 ft 7 in)	Medan
West Sumatra	Puji Chegana	20	1.76 m (5 ft 9 in)	Sawahlunto
Riau	Astari Aslam	24	1.74 m (5 ft 9 in)	Pekanbaru
Riau Islands	Nadya Lavania Tarigan	20	1.69 m (5 ft 7 in)	Batam
Jambi	Sheila Apsari	22	1.66 m (5 ft 5 in)	Jambi
South Sumatra	Nur Harisyah Pratiwi	21	1.83 m (6 ft 0 in)	Palembang
Bangka Belitung	Cut Nadia Dwi Ramadhani	21	1.71 m (5 ft 7 in)	Pangkal Pinang
Bengkulu	Intan Saumadina	25	1.69 m (5 ft 7 in)	Kaur Regency
Lampung	Feriska Anggrelita	19	1.74 m (5 ft 9 in)	Bandar Lampung
JAVA
Jakarta Special Capital Region 1	Karina Nandia Saputri	23	1.82 m (6 ft 0 in)	Jakarta
Jakarta Special Capital Region 2	Dita Fakhrana Utami	22	1.70 m (5 ft 7 in)	Jakarta
Jakarta Special Capital Region 3	Nadya Maudy Juliana	19	1.72 m (5 ft 8 in)	Jakarta
Jakarta Special Capital Region 4	Suci Marliani	24	1.68 m (5 ft 6 in)	Jakarta
Jakarta Special Capital Region 5	Bunga Jelitha Ibrani	25	1.80 m (5 ft 11 in)	Jakarta
Jakarta Special Capital Region 6	Maulvi Zehra	22	1.69 m (5 ft 7 in)	Jakarta
Banten	Ratu Vashti Annisa	21	1.72 m (5 ft 8 in)	Tangerang
West Java	Kevin Lilliana	21	1.77 m (5 ft 10 in)	Bandung
Central Java	Dea Rizkita	23	1.73 m (5 ft 8 in)	Ungaran
Yogyakarta Special Region	Sherafina Saputro	22	1.70 m (5 ft 7 in)	Yogyakarta
East Java	Fatma Ayu Husnasari	20	1.72 m (5 ft 8 in)	Blitar
LESSER SUNDA ISLANDS
Bali	Devina Bertha	19	1.70 m (5 ft 7 in)	Denpasar
West Nusa Tenggara	Ni Komang Sri Maya Dian Lestari	19	1.68 m (5 ft 6 in)	Mataram
East Nusa Tenggara	Karina Nadila Niab	24	1.71 m (5 ft 7 in)	Kupang
KALIMANTAN
West Kalimantan	Pingkan Rilly Yunita	24	1.68 m (5 ft 6 in)	Pontianak
South Kalimantan	Suci Hastini	20	1.73 m (5 ft 8 in)	Banjarmasin
East Kalimantan	Gituen Miracline Samantha	23	1.74 m (5 ft 9 in)	Balikpapan
North Kalimantan	Fatya Ginanjarsari	23	1.77 m (5 ft 10 in)	Nunukan Regency
SULAWESI
South Sulawesi	Nur Fitriyani	19	1.76 m (5 ft 9 in)	Makassar
West Sulawesi	Evelyne Yulyessia	24	1.83 m (6 ft 0 in)	Mamasa
Southeast Sulawesi	Dayu Putu Mirawati	22	1.70 m (5 ft 7 in)	Baubau
Central Sulawesi	Monica Broksil	19	1.68 m (5 ft 6 in)	Palu
North Sulawesi	Luana Jenissa Evita Kenap	19	1.75 m (5 ft 9 in)	South Minahasa
Gorontalo	Nadhilah Dhina Shabrina	24	1.66 m (5 ft 5 in)	Gorontalo
EASTERN INDONESIA
Maluku	Anastasia de Fretes	25	1.73 m (5 ft 8 in)	Ambon Island
North Maluku	Sarjia Samin Ibrahim	24	1.69 m (5 ft 7 in)	Ternate
West Papua	Leidy Herlin Rumbiak	19	1.68 m (5 ft 6 in)	Sorong
Papua	Fredrika Mitra Munua	24	1.70 m (5 ft 7 in)	Wamena

== Crossovers ==
Contestants who previously experienced in model or beauty pageants:

- North Sumatra: Putri Mentari Sitanggang won Miss UNPRI 2014.
- South Sumatra: Nur Harisyah Pratiwi won Putri Sriwijaya 2015, Gadis Palembang 2014 and Bujang Gadis Kampus Sumsel 2013.
- Bangka Belitung: Cut Nadia Dwi Ramadhani won Putri Pariwisata Bangka Belitung 2012 and awarded as Best Traditional Costume at the Putri Pariwisata Indonesia 2012.
- Bengkulu: Intan Saumadina placed as the first runner-up Putri Pariwisata Bengkulu 2012.
- Riau: Astari Aslam competed at Miss Indonesia 2011 represented Riau Islands
- Jakarta Special Capital Region 1: Karina Nandia Saputri competed at Miss Indonesia 2013
- Jakarta Special Capital Region 5: Bunga Jelitha Ibrani won the Supermodel International 2011 and Guess Girl Southeast Asia 2015.
- Banten: Ratu Vashti Annisa won None Jakarta Selatan 2014.
- East Java: Fatma Ayu Husnasari placed as the fourth runner-up Raki Jawa Timur 2015 and Diajeng Blitar 2014.
- Bali: Devina Bertha placed as the second runner-up Cantik Indonesia Transtv 2015.
- South Kalimantan: Suci Hastini won Best Catwalk Indonesia Top Model 2016.
- North Kalimantan: Fatya Ginanjarsari competed at Miss Indonesia 2011 represented Jakarta SCR (finished Top 5), the Face of Indonesia 2015 and Top 15 Guess Girl Indonesia 2015
- West Sulawesi: Evelyne Yulyessia won Miss Model World Indonesia 2016.
- Central Sulawesi: Monica Broksil won Putri Pariwisata Central Sulawesi 2015
- Gorontalo: Nadhilah Dhina Shabrina competed at 2015 Miss Scuba International

== Post-pageant notes ==
- Bunga Jelitha, Miss Universe Indonesia, competed in Miss Universe 2017 held on November 26, 2017, at The AXIS, Las Vegas, Nevada, United States.
- Kevin Lilliana, Miss International Indonesia, competed in Miss International 2017 held on November 14 at the Tokyo Dome City Hall in Tokyo, Japan where she was crowned Miss International 2017.
- Karina Nadila, Miss Supranational Indonesia, hailed among Top 25 at Miss Supranational 2017 during the finals held on December 1, 2017, at Krynica Zdroj, Poland.
- Dea Rizkita, Miss Grand Indonesia, hailed among Top 10 and won Best National Costume at Miss Grand International 2017 during the finals held on October 25 at Phu Quoc, Vietnam.
