= Sabrina Chairunnisa =

Indonesian model, actress, YouTuber and former beauty pageant titleholder

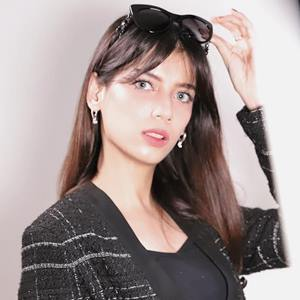
- Born: November 19, 1992 (age 33); Medan, North Sumatera, Indonesia
- Education: Pelita Harapan University; Trisakti University
- Occupations: Model; YouTuber; Beauty pageant titleholder
- Years active: 2008 - present
- Title: 2011 Puteri Indonesia Sumatera Utara; 3rd Runner Up Puteri Indonesia 2011
- Spouse: Deddy Corbuzier (m. 2022)
- Parents: Irwan Hasbullah (father); Aminah Nasution (mother)

Sabrina Chairunnisa (born 19 November 1992) is an Indonesian model, actress, YouTuber, and former beauty pageant titleholder who was crowned Puteri Indonesia North Sumatera 2011. She represented North Sumatera in the Puteri Indonesia 2011, where she was crowned 3rd Runner Up, behind Maria Selena Nurcahya (Puteri Indonesia 2011), Liza Elly Purnamasari (Puteri Indonesia Lingkungan 2011) and Andi Tenri Gusti Hanum Utari Natassa (Puteri Indonesia Pariwisata 2011). She is married to the television presenter and former mentalist Deddy Corbuzier.

== Background and education ==
Sabrina Chairunnisa was born on 9 November 1992, in Medan, North Sumatera to a couple of Irwan Hasbullah - Aminah Nasution. She earned a bachelor's degree from Trisakti University. She then continued postgraduate study at Pelita Harapan University and graduated with a master's degree in communication. She is of Iraqi descent.

== Personal life ==
On 6 June 2022, Sabrina Chairunnisa married actor and former magician Deddy Corbuzier after nine years of dating.

== Career ==
=== Early career ===
Sabrina Chairunnisa started her career by becoming the winner of Idola Cilik Remaja Indonesia. Since then, she has become known to the public. In 2008, she began her acting career by playing as Brenda in the soap opera Kepompong until 2009.

In 2011, after successfully holding the title of Puteri Indonesia North Sumatera 2011, Sabrina Chairunnisa represented North Sumatera in the Puteri Indonesia 2011, which was held at the Jakarta Convention Center on 7 October 2011. At the end of the event, she was crowned 3rd Runner Up, and the contest was won by a contestant from Central Java, Maria Selena.

== Filmography ==
- Kepompong (2008)
