= Ayu Diandra Sari =

TV Presenter, Miss International Indonesia 2009

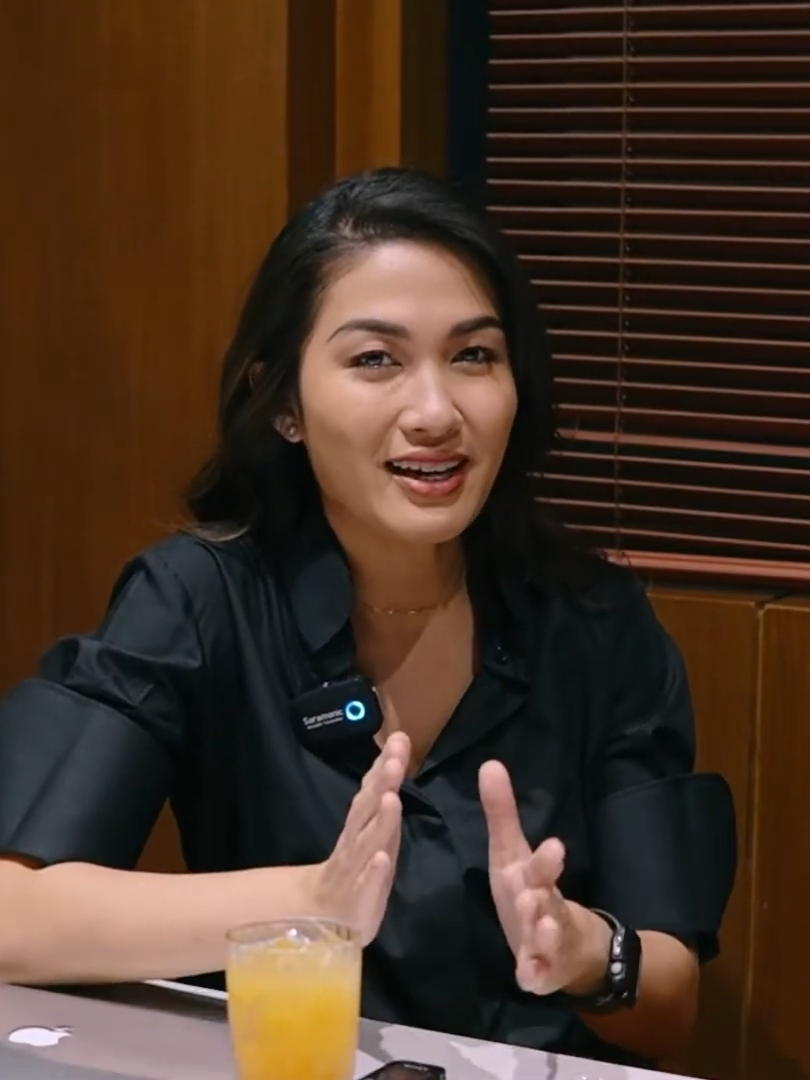
- Miss International Indonesia 2009
- Born: 4 August 1988 (age 38); Denpasar, Bali, Indonesia
- Education: Udayana University
- Occupations: presenter; doctor; fashion model; Beauty pageant titleholders
- Height: 175 cm (5 ft 9 in)
- Beauty pageant titleholder
- Title: Puteri Indonesia Lingkungan 2008; Miss International Indonesia 2009
- Hair color: Brown
- Eye color: Brown
- Major competitions: Puteri Indonesia 2008; (1st Runner-up – Puteri Indonesia Lingkungan 2008); Miss International 2009; (Unplaced)

Ayu Diandra Sari (born 4 August 1988) is an Indonesian presenter, doctor, fashion model and a beauty pageant titleholder who won the title of Puteri Indonesia Lingkungan 2008. She represented Indonesia at the Miss International 2009 pageant in Chengdu, China.

== Early life and education ==
Ayu was born in Denpasar, Bali to traditional Balinese-Hindu parents. She holds a magister degree in Doctor of Medicine from Faculty of Medicine of Udayana University, Denpasar – Bali.

== Pageantry ==
=== Puteri Indonesia 2008 ===
Ayu represented Bali at Puteri Indonesia 2008, where she was crowned as Puteri Indonesia Lingkungan 2008 at the grand finale held in Jakarta Convention Center, Jakarta, Indonesia on 15 August 2008, by the outgoing titleholder of Puteri Indonesia Lingkungan 2007, Duma Riris Silalahi of North Sumatra.

=== Miss International 2009 ===
As Puteri Indonesia Lingkungan 2008, Ayu represented Indonesia at the 49th edition of Miss International 2009 pageant held in Sichuan International Tennis Center, Chengdu, Sichuan, China. The finale was held on 28 November 2009. She wore a one-piece swimsuit during swimwear competition and a kebaya designed by Anne Avantie as her national costume.

== See also ==
- Zivanna Letisha Siregar

Awards and achievements
Preceded by Fransisca Lidyawati	Puteri Bali; 2008	Succeeded by Ni Putu Sukmadewi Eka Utami
Preceded by Duma Riris Silalahi (North Sumatra)	Puteri Indonesia Lingkungan; 2008	Succeeded by Zukhriatul Hafizah Muhammad (West Sumatra)
