= Alessandra Usman =

Indonesian film actress and model

- Born: Alessandra Khadijah Usman; December 21, 1988 (age 37); Jakarta, Indonesia
- Education: Bandung Institute of Technology
- Height: 1.73 m (5 ft 8 in)
- Spouse: Agga Diguci (m. 2017)
- Children: Salma Rosevella Diguci (2018)
- Beauty pageant titleholder
- Title: Puteri Indonesia Pariwisata 2010; Miss Asia Pacific World Indonesia 2011
- Hair color: Dark brown
- Eye color: Dark brown
- Major competitions: Puteri Indonesia 2010; (2nd Runner-up – Puteri Indonesia Pariwisata 2010); Miss Asia Pacific World 2011; (1st Runner-up)

Alessandra Khadijah Usman (born December 21, 1988) is an Indonesian film actress, Ambassador for Ministry of Tourism of Indonesia, model and beauty pageant titleholder who won the Puteri Indonesia Pariwisata of Puteri Indonesia 2010, and automatically acquired the title Puteri Indonesia Pariwisata 2010. She represented Indonesia in Miss Asia Pacific World 2011, where she ended-up won 1st Runner-up and Best Style Dress award in the pageant.

== Early life and education ==
Alessandra was born in Jakarta – Indonesia, to a Dutch mother Lunggi Nodie and Gorontaloan father, Mohamad El Idris Usman. She has one older sister, Sarah Marhula Usman and two younger brothers named Mohammad Salman Usman (died on June 4, 2011) and Mohammad Salahuddin Usman. She has been working as a model since the age of 15, and her hobby includes dancing and pilates. She has also been working as an Ambassador for Ministry of Tourism of Indonesia, since she was crowned as Puteri Indonesia Pariwisata 2019. She holds a bachelor's degree in Business Management from Bandung Institute of Technology, Bandung, West Java, Indonesia.

On September 14, 2017, Alessandra was married to an Indonesian property businessman, Agga Diguci. The wedding reception was held in Jakarta – Indonesia with a Gorontaloan tradition and heritage theme. she is giving birth to her first daughter Salma Rosevella Diguci on June 12, 2018.

== Pageantry ==
=== Puteri Indonesia 2010 ===
Alessandra Usman, competed in Puteri Indonesia 2010 national pageant as the representative of her hometown province Gorontalo, Alessandra was crowned Puteri Indonesia Pariwisata 2010 at the finals held at the Jakarta Convention Center, Jakarta, on October 8, 2010, by the outgoing titleholder of Puteri Indonesia Pariwisata 2005, Isti Ayu Pratiwi of North Maluku.

Alessandra was crowned together with her two bestfriends, Nadine Alexandra Dewi Ames as Puteri Indonesia 2010 and Reisa Kartikasari Broto Asmoro as Puteri Indonesia Lingkungan 2010.

=== Miss Asia Pacific World 2011 ===
As Puteri Indonesia Pariwisata 2010, Sandra represented Indonesia in Miss Asia Pacific World 2011 on October 15, broadcast live from Busan Yachting Center, Busan, South Korea. Before the pageant begin, she was the most favourite to win the Miss Asia Pacific World 2011 crown in many pageant-polis. She placed as the 1st runner-up, and won the Best Style Dress award in the pageant.

== Filmography ==
Alessandra has appeared on several television film and cinema film. On 2016, Alessandra started her foray into the world of acting career where she is starred on I am Hope, together with actress Tatjana Saphira and actor Tio Pakusadewo.

=== Movies ===
Year	Title	Genre	Role	Film Production	Ref.
2016	I am Hope	drama film	as Maia	SinemArt	

Awards and achievements
Preceded by Aluisha Saboe	Puteri Gorontalo; 2010	Succeeded by Sheyla Drajat Prihastuti
Preceded by Isti Ayu Pratiwi (North Maluku)	Puteri Indonesia Pariwisata; 2010	Succeeded by Andi Tenri Natassa (South Sulawesi)

Puteri Indonesia titleholders (2010)
Puteri Indonesia 2010 (Miss Universe Indonesia 2011); Jakarta SCR 4 – Nadine Alexandra Dewi Ames	Puteri Indonesia Lingkungan 2010 (Miss International Indonesia 2011); Special Region of Yogyakarta – Reisa Kartikasari Broto Asmoro	Puteri Indonesia Pariwisata 2010 (Miss Asia Pacific Indonesia 2011); Gorontalo – Alessandra Khadijah Usman
