= Zukhriatul Hafizah =

Indonesian model and beauty pageant winner

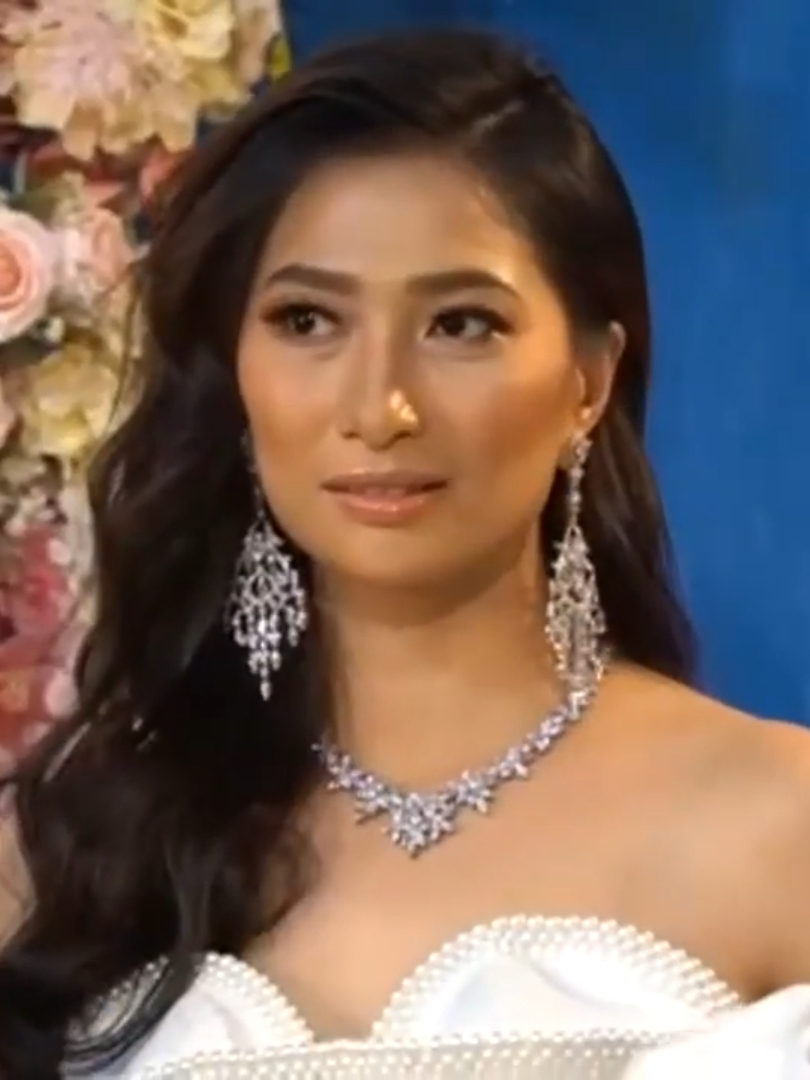
- Miss International Indonesia 2010, Zukhriatul Hafizah in photoshoot
- Born: Zukhriatul Hafizah; 8 July 1987 (age 39); Bekasi, West Java, Indonesia
- Education: The London School of Public Relations
- Occupations: Indonesian secretary of Ministry of Transportation; model; beauty camp guru; Beauty pageant titleholders
- Title: Puteri Indonesia Lingkungan 2009; Miss International Indonesia 2010
- Modeling information
- Height: 177 cm (5 ft 10 in)
- Hair color: Black
- Eye color: Brown

Zukhriatul Hafizah (born 8 July 1987) popularly known as Fiza is an Indonesian secretary of Ministry of Transportation, model and beauty pageant titleholder, who won the title of Puteri Indonesia Lingkungan 2009. She represented Indonesia at the Miss International 2010 pageant in Chengdu, China, where she won Miss Congeniality.

== Early life and education ==
Hafizah graduated her bachelor degree in Business Accountant from The London School of Public Relations, Jakarta, Indonesia. She works as a secretary of the Indonesian Ministry of Transportation.

== Pageantry ==
=== Puteri Indonesia 2009 ===
Hafizah was crowned as Puteri Indonesia Lingkungan 2009 at the grand finale held in Jakarta Convention Center, Jakarta, Indonesia on 9 October 2009, by the outgoing titleholder of Puteri Indonesia Lingkungan 2008, Ayu Diandra Sari Tjakra of Bali.

=== Miss International 2010 ===
As Puteri Indonesia Lingkungan 2009, Hafizah represented Indonesia at the 50th edition of Miss International 2010 pageant held in Sichuan Province Gymnasium, Chengdu, China. The finale was held on 7 November 2010. She won Miss Friendship award at the pageant. Miss International 2009, Anagabriela Espinoza of Mexico crowned her successor, Elizabeth Mosquera of Venezuela, at the end of the event.

=== Training other competitors ===
Puteri owns Ratu Sejagad, a beauty pageant camp in Indonesia. Competitors who have trained at the camp include Sonia Fergina Citra, who finished in the top 20 of Miss Universe 2018; Frederika Alexis Cull, top 10 of Miss Universe 2019; and Laksmi Shari De-Neefe Suardana, who will compete in Miss Universe 2022.

== See also ==
- Puteri Indonesia 2009
- Miss International
- Miss International 2010
- Qory Sandioriva

Awards and achievements
Preceded by Raline Shah	Puteri North Sumatra; 2009	Succeeded by Cut Nabila Azhar
Preceded by Ayu Diandra Sari Tjakra (Bali)	Puteri Indonesia Lingkungan; 2009	Succeeded by Reisa Kartikasari (SR Yogyakarta)
