= Nadine Ames =

Indonesian actress and beauty pageant title holder (born 1991)

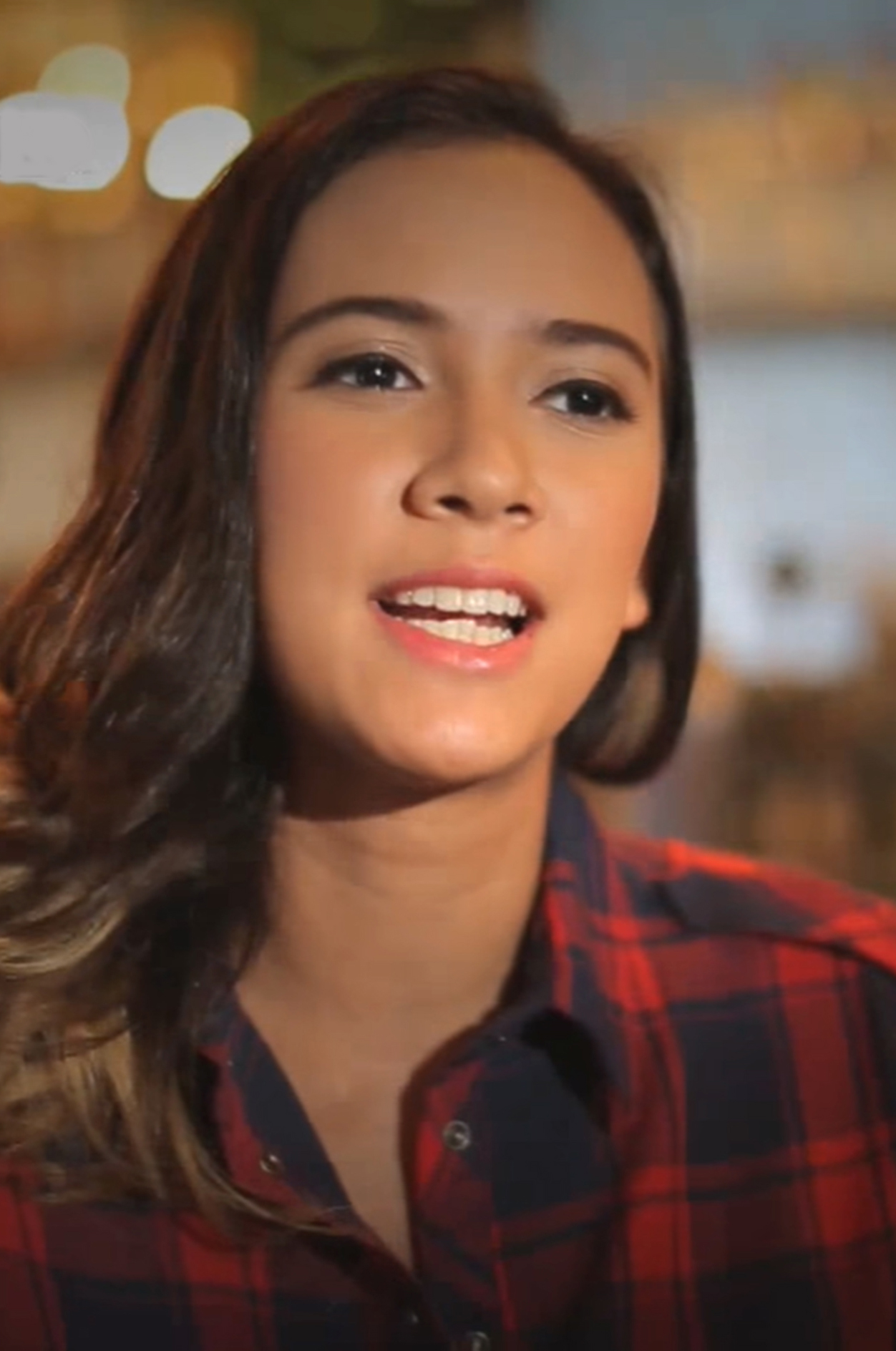
- Ames in 2019
- Born: Nadine Alexandra Dewi Ames; 23 May 1991 (age 35); Winchester, England
- Education: Bath Spa University (BFA); North Jakarta International School; Gandhi Memorial International School
- Occupations: Actress; model; philanthropist
- Height: 1.74 m (5 ft 8 1/2 in)
- Beauty pageant titleholder
- Title: Puteri Indonesia 2010; Miss Universe Indonesia 2011
- Hair color: Brown
- Eye color: Brown
- Major competitions: Puteri Indonesia 2010; (Winner); Miss Universe 2011; (Unplaced)

Nadine Alexandra Dewi Ames (born 23 May 1991) is a British-Indonesian actress, model, philanthropist and beauty pageant titleholder who was crowned Puteri Indonesia 2010 and represented her country in the Miss Universe 2011 pageant held at the Credicard Hall in São Paulo, Brazil on September 12, 2011.

== Early life, education and advocacy ==
Ames was born in Winchester, England - Great Britain, to an English father Clive Robbin Ames and Javanese mother Noer Hayati Dewi who hailed from Surakarta, Central Java - Indonesia. Her family moved to Jakarta when she was two months old. She spent most of her childhood in Jakarta.

Ames attended the North Jakarta International School and Gandhi Memorial International School. She also took a modelling course at the OQ Modelling School, in Kelapa Gading which led to her appearance in the Indonesian soap opera Inikah Cinta. In 2013, Ames holds a Bachelor degree of Fine Arts (BFA) in Filmmaking and Television from Bath Spa University in Bath, Somerset, England.

Ames is a polyglot, she fluently speaks in English, French and Indonesian. Since 2010, Ames involved in wildlife conservation for protected species of Orangutan together with an Indonesian non-profit non-governmental organization Borneo Orangutan Survival founded by Dr.Willie Smits.

== Puteri Indonesia 2010 and Miss Universe 2011 ==
Ames, who stands 1.74 m (5 ft 8 1/2 in), competed as the representative of Jakarta SCR 4, winning Indonesia's's national beauty pageant, Puteri Indonesia 2010, in Jakarta on 8 October 2010. Ames represented Indonesia in the 2011 Miss Universe pageant, in São Paulo, Brazil on 12 September 2011, but was unplaced.

== Filmography ==
=== Movies ===
Year	Title	Genre	Role	Film Production	Ref.
2012	Sang Martir	thriller	as herself	Soraya Intercine Films	
2012	Loe Gue End	romance	as Alana	Ganesha Film	
2012	Slank Nggak Ada Matinya	comedy	as Nadine	Kharisma Starvision Plus	
2015	Komedi Moderen Gokil	comedy	as Sasha	MD Entertainment	
2017	Filosofi Kopi 2: Ben & Jody	romance	as Brie	Visinema Pictures	
2018	Gentayangan	horror	as Sofia Karindra	Multi Vision Plus	
2018	Mama Mama Jagoan	romance film	as Nadine	Multi Vision Plus	
2019	Sin	romance	as Rinjani	Falcon Pictures	
2021	Persepsi	horror	as Andrea Risma	Falcon Pictures	
2022	Perfect Strangers	drama	as Eva	Falcon Pictures	
2023	Ganjil Genap	comedy	as Sydney	MD Pictures	
2023	Pasutri Gaje	romance	as Michelle	MD Pictures	

Awards and achievements
Preceded by Natalie Pertiwi Hermanto	Puteri Jakarta SCR 4; 2010	Succeeded by Wimmy Sunarto
Preceded by Aceh – Qory Sandioriva	Puteri Indonesia; 2010	Succeeded by Central Java – Maria Selena Nurcahya
