= Puteri Indonesia 2011 =

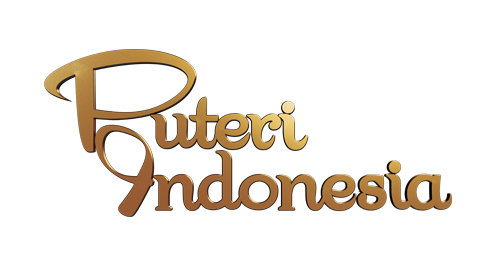
- Date: 7 October 2011
- Presenters: Choky Sitohang, Nadia Mulya, Melanie Putria, Zivanna Letisha
- Entertainment: Bunga Citra Lestari, Cherry Belle, Yovie & Nuno, Eka Deli, Christopher Abimanyu
- Venue: Jakarta Convention Center, Jakarta, Indonesia
- Broadcaster: Indosiar
- Entrants: 38
- Placements: 10
- Winner: Maria Selena; Central Java

Puteri Indonesia 2011, the 16th Annual Puteri Indonesia beauty pageant, was held in Jakarta Convention Center, Jakarta, Indonesia on 7 October 2011. Thirty eight contestants from all 33 provinces of Indonesia competed for the title of Puteri Indonesia, one of the most prominent beauty pageant titles in the country.

Nadine Alexandra Dewi Ames, Puteri Indonesia 2010 from Jakarta Special Capital Region 4 crowned Maria Selena of Central Java at the end of this event at Plenary Hall, Jakarta Convention Center, Jakarta. Maria Selena of Central Java was selected to represent Indonesia at the Miss Universe 2012, while Liza Elly Purnamasari of East Java and Andi Tenri Gusti Hanum Utari Natassa of South Sulawesi were to represent the nation at the Miss International 2012 and the Miss Asia Pacific World 2012, respectively. The event was broadcast live on Indonesian television network, Indosiar. Miss Universe 2011, Leila Lopes, was present during the event.

== Result ==
The Crowns of Puteri Indonesia Title Holders

Puteri Indonesia 2011 (Miss Universe Indonesia 2011)
Puteri Indonesia Lingkungan 2011 (Miss International Indonesia 2011)
Puteri Indonesia Pariwisata 2011 (Miss Asia Pacific Indonesia 2011)

| Final Results | Contestant | International Placement |
|---|---|---|
| Puteri Indonesia 2011 (Miss Universe Indonesia) | Central Java: Maria Selena Nurcahya | Unplaced – Miss Universe 2012 |
| Puteri Indonesia Lingkungan 2011 (Miss International Indonesia) | East Java: Liza Elly Purnamasari | Unplaced– Miss International 2012 |
| Puteri Indonesia Pariwisata 2011 (Miss Asia Pacific Indonesia) | South Sulawesi: Andi Tenri Gusti Hanum Utari Natassa | Top 15 – Miss Asia Pacific World 2012 |
| Top 5 | North Sumatra – Sabrina Chairunissa; Yogyakarta Special Region – Dinda Rizky Hutari | |
| Top 10 | West Sumatra – Annisa Ananda Nusyirwan; Jakarta SCR 2 – Annisa Putri Ayudya; Jakarta SCR 5 – Faradina Mufti Rachmawati; East Kalimantan – Asri Silva Shorea; West Papua – Saskia Florencia Nanlohy Mobalen | |

== Contestants ==
| Province | Delegate | Age | Height (cm) | Hometown |
|---|---|---|---|---|
| Aceh | Lisya Annurrahmi | 21 | 171 cm (5 ft 7 1/2 in) | Lhokseumawe |
| North Sumatra | Sabrina Chairunnisa | 18 | 174 cm (5 ft 8 1/2 in) | Pematangsiantar |
| West Sumatra | Annisa Ananda Nusyirwan | 20 | 175 cm (5 ft 9 in) | Solok |
| Riau | Debby Komala Sari | 19 | 180 cm (5 ft 11 in) | Pekanbaru |
| Riau Islands | Bella Fatma Pratiwi | 22 | 178 cm (5 ft 10 in) | Batam |
| Jambi | Eka Yuni Wulandari | 22 | 175 cm (5 ft 9 in) | Jambi |
| South Sumatra | Atika Zulia Zaini | 19 | 173 cm (5 ft 8 in) | Palembang |
| Bangka-Belitung Islands | Nur Rahma Umami | 21 | 168 cm (5 ft 6 in) | Muntok |
| Bengkulu | Winda Hariyanti Hasan | 21 | 168 cm (5 ft 6 in) | Seluma |
| Lampung | Adinda Putri Mirsyah Arini | 20 | 173 cm (5 ft 8 in) | Tulang Bawang |
| Jakarta Special Capital Region 1 | Nadia Sekar Yasmine | 24 | 173 cm (5 ft 8 in) | Jakarta |
| Jakarta Special Capital Region 2 | Annisa Putri Ayudya | 23 | 170 cm (5 ft 7 in) | Jakarta |
| Jakarta Special Capital Region 3 | Dinantiar Anditra | 23 | 171 cm (5 ft 7 1/2 in) | Jakarta |
| Jakarta Special Capital Region 4 | Wimmy Sunarto | 22 | 172 cm (5 ft 7 1/2 in) | Jakarta |
| Jakarta Special Capital Region 5 | Faradina Mufti Rachmawati | 22 | 170 cm (5 ft 7 in) | Jakarta |
| Jakarta Special Capital Region 6 | Rieka Nur Asy Syam | 23 | 170 cm (5 ft 7 in) | Jakarta |
| Banten | Rahajeng Sekar Putri | 20 | 168 cm (5 ft 6 in) | Tangerang |
| West Java | Shinta Indra Maya Sari Sinaga | 18 | 171 cm (5 ft 7 1/2 in) | Bogor |
| Central Java | Maria Selena Nurcahya | 21 | 177 cm (5 ft 9 1/2 in) | Semarang |
| Yogyakarta Special Region | Dinda Rizky Hutari | 20 | 173 cm (5 ft 8 in) | Yogyakarta |
| East Java | Liza Elly Purnamasari | 20 | 176 cm (5 ft 9 1/2 in) | Malang |
| Bali | Anak Agung Istri Karina Manik | 19 | 173 cm (5 ft 8 in) | Denpasar |
| West Nusa Tenggara | Yulfa Rizki Amita | 23 | 171 cm (5 ft 7 1/2 in) | East Lombok |
| East Nusa Tenggara | Julia Stevanny Esther Tahri Blegur | 21 | 169 cm (5 ft 6 1/2 in) | Waikabubak |
| West Kalimantan | Miranda Surya Wardhany | 18 | 171 cm (5 ft 7 1/2 in) | Pontianak |
| South Kalimantan | Ninggar Ayu Neswari | 19 | 174 cm (5 ft 8 1/2 in) | Banjarbaru |
| Central Kalimantan | Neny Khurnaini Irianty | 24 | 173 cm (5 ft 8 in) | Palangkaraya |
| East Kalimantan | Asri Silva Shorea | 22 | 175 cm (5 ft 9 in) | Balikpapan |
| South Sulawesi | Andi Tenri Gusti Hanum Utari Natassa | 19 | 173 cm (5 ft 8 in) | Gowa |
| West Sulawesi | Ade Apriliany Tahir | 18 | 168 cm (5 ft 6 in) | Pasangkayu |
| Southeast Sulawesi | Rizky Fitriyani Rustam | 23 | 168 cm (5 ft 6 in) | Bombana |
| Central Sulawesi | Iselly Ranindaya Oktavia Tandawuya | 21 | 176 cm (5 ft 9 1/2 in) | Poso |
| North Sulawesi | Monica Septiani Satriawan | 22 | 171 cm (5 ft 7 1/2 in) | Manado |
| Gorontalo | Deacy Widya Hayer Luawo | 18 | 173 cm (5 ft 8 in) | Gorontalo |
| Maluku | Audry Gabrielle Marsha Tentua | 20 | 167 cm (5 ft 5 1/2 in) | Ambon |
| North Maluku | Sasmita Abdurahman | 18 | 171 cm (5 ft 7 1/2 in) | Ternate |
| Papua | Herllyn Paula Mambai | 25 | 173 cm (5 ft 8 in) | Serui |
| West Papua | Saskia Florencia Nanlohy Mobalen | 20 | 171 cm (5 ft 7 1/2 in) | Fakfak |

=== Replacements ===
- South Sumatera was supposed to be represented by Apriliza Ralasati, but her runner-up, Atika Zulia, took the title because she didn't get dispensation from her university.

== See also ==
- Miss Indonesia 2011
