= Al-Izhar Pondok Labu =

Islamic school in South Jakarta, Indonesia

Coordinates: 6.310°S 106.792°E

Al-Izhar Pondok Labu (AIPL) is a moderate Islamic K-12 school in Pondok Labu, South Jakarta, Indonesia. It consists of a kindergarten, primary school, junior secondary school and senior secondary school. It is a National Plus school and the language of instruction is Indonesian. The school's motto is Beriman, Mandiri, Kreatif, Nasionalis or Pious, Independent, Creative, Nationalist.

== History ==
AIPL was founded by Bustanil Arifin, a former Minister of Cooperation and Small and Medium Enterprises. It was established in 1974, beginning with its kindergarten program, officially opened by the Minister of Education at the time, Fuad Hassan. The following year, the school opened a primary school. In 1979, the junior secondary school was officially opened by B. J. Habibie, then-Chairman of the Union of Intellectual Indonesian Muslims who later became the third president of Indonesia. In 1982 it completed its offering of educational levels when it opened a senior secondary school, officiated by Wardiman Djojonegoro, the Minister of Education and Culture at the time.

== Campus ==
The school is located on RS Fatmawati Street, near Pondok Labu market in South Jakarta. The campus includes separate buildings for the four schools, a library, track field, two soccer fields, outdoor basketball court, air-conditioned theater, indoor basketball-court, a mosque and a creche.

== Curriculum and activities ==
=== Kindergarten ===
The two-year kindergarten curriculum includes science, language, manipulative media, mathematics, singing and music, and physical education. Students are also asked to select one of a range of extracurricular activities, included in the tuition. For level A (younger students) these are arts, dancing, sports and singing. For level B these are dancing, Koran, singing and gamelan.

=== Primary school ===
The primary school follows a competency-based curriculum. In its core is the National Curriculum as set out by the Ministry of National Education, incorporating Indonesian, English, civic education, Islamic studies, mathematics, social science, natural science, health and physical education, arts and crafts. Students are required to take a computer studies as an extracurricular activity. Additionally, they may choose one of the following extracurricular activities: arts, soccer, singing, basketball, scouts, dance, pencak silat, badminton, computer club, Koran reading and athletics.

=== Junior secondary school ===
At its core, the junior secondary school also follows a competency-based curriculum as set out by the Ministry of National Education. This incorporates Islamic studies, civic education, Indonesian, English, mathematics, natural science, social studies, arts or music, health and physical sciences, ICT and self-development (either home economics or electronics). The selection of extracurricular activities are soccer, basketball, electronics club, English club, science club, badminton, photography, Basic Leadership Training (compulsory for grade 1 students), Japanese and Mandarin.

=== Senior secondary school ===
In their first year, students in the senior secondary school study a comprehensive curriculum incorporating Islamic studies, civics, English, history, physical education, mathematics, physics, biology, chemistry, economics/accounting, sociology, geography, arts/music, local competency, computer, French, and Mandarin. In their final two years, students are streamed into a natural science (basic curriculum plus chemistry, physics, biology and advanced mathematics) and social science (basic curriculum plus economics, sociology and geography) streams depending on their first year marks and their preference. Extracurricular activities include English debating, soccer, basketball, traditional dance, flag-raising, drama, badminton, taekwondo, science, graphic design and catering.

=== Achievements ===
In 2005, the Education Counsellor at the Australian Embassy in Jakarta named Al-Izhar along two other National Plus schools an international-standard school, on the basis of the "quality of their teachers and the achievements of their students".

Students of the school have won international awards and medals for mathematics, technological innovation, debating championships, performed as a choir and orchestra group at international summits and performed fundraising musical theatre. Its teachers have been awarded for developing good practice teaching methods by UNESCO, and published best-selling examination preparation books.

== Notable alumni ==
- Gita Gutawa, young soprano singer
- Tashya Kamila, singer, actress.
- Lala Karmela, Indonesian-Filipino singer
- Elok Pratiwi, actress in South Korea (The Exclusive: Beat The Devil's Tattoo)
- Mesty Ariotedjo, model; harpist; socialite
- Wulan Guritno, actress and television presenter
- Zivanna Letisha Siregar, Puteri Indonesia 2008 (Miss Indonesia Universe 2009)
- Rayi Putra Rahardjo, singer, member of RAN (Indonesian group)
- Astono Andoko, musician, member of RAN (Indonesian group)
- Anindyo Baskoro, singer, member of RAN (Indonesian group)
- Kaneishia Yusuf, singer and actress
