= Putri Raemawasti =

- Born: Gracia Putri Raemawasti Mulyono; 5 December 1986 (age 39); Blitar, East Java, Indonesia
- Education: Institut Teknologi Sepuluh Nopember
- Beauty pageant titleholder
- Title: Puteri Indonesia 2007; Miss Universe Indonesia 2008
- Major competitions: Puteri Indonesia 2007; (Winner); Miss Universe 2008; (Unplaced)

Gracia Putri Raemawasti Mulyono (born 5 December 1986 in Blitar, East Java) is an Indonesian public figure, journalist and beauty pageant titleholder who won the title of Puteri Indonesia 2007 (Miss Indonesia Universe 2007) representing East Java. She has attended the Institut Teknologi Sepuluh Nopember, Surabaya, majoring in industrial engineering.

== Pageantry ==
=== Puteri Indonesia 2007 ===
Raemawasti represented the province of East Java in the Puteri Indonesia 2007 national beauty contest. Raemawasti was crowned Puteri Indonesia 2007 at the finals held at the Jakarta Convention Center, on 3 August 2007, by the outgoing titleholder of Puteri Indonesia 2006, Agni Pratistha Arkadewi Kuswardono of Central Java. She was selected as the winner of Miss Universe Indonesia. The final coronation night was graced by the reigning Miss Universe 2007, Riyo Mori of Japan.

=== Miss Universe 2008 ===
Raemawasti represented Indonesia at the Miss Universe 2008, but was unplaced. At the Miss Universe, she was the first Miss Indonesia to wear a two-piece bathing suit rather than the usual maillot one piece during the final presentation show. Dayana Mendoza of Venezuela was crowned by Riyo Mori as her successor at the end of the event.

== See also ==
- Puteri Indonesia 2007
- Miss Universe
- Miss Universe 2008
- Duma Riris Silalahi

Awards and achievements
Preceded by Jaswin	Puteri East Java; 2007	Succeeded by Yustin Karina
Preceded by Central Java – Agni Pratistha	Puteri Indonesia; 2007	Succeeded by Jakarta SCR 6 – Zivanna Letisha Siregar
