= Gandhi Memorial Intercontinental School =

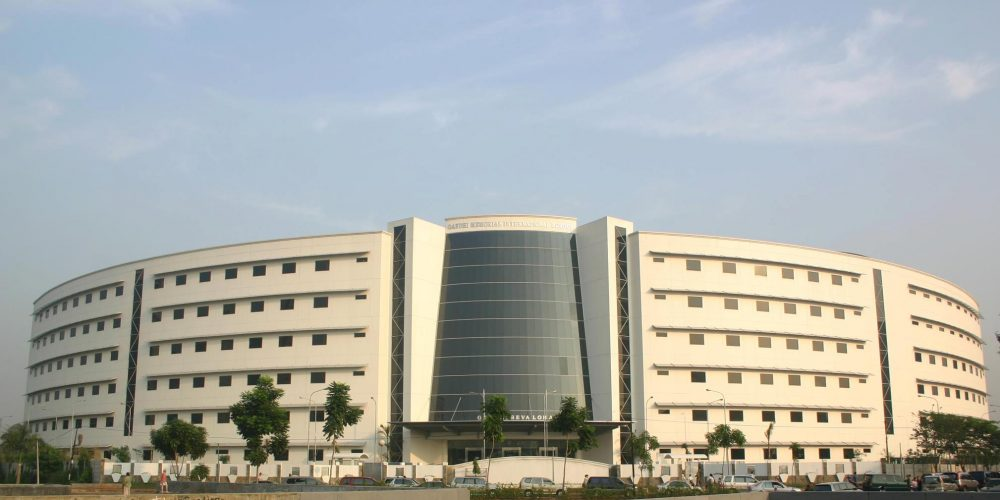
- The GMIS campus in Jakarta

Location
- 1st HBR Motik Street, Kemayoran; Jakarta, 10410; Indonesia

Information
- Type: Private international school
- Motto: Virtu et labore (Virtue and exertion)
- Established: 1950
- Closed: 5:00 PM
- Chairman: Gope Samtani
- Grades: Nursery–12
- Gender: Co-educational
- Age range: 3–18
- Language: English
- Houses: Kartini; Tolstoy; Lincoln; Tagore
- Colour: Light blue
- Website: www.gandhijkt.org

Gandhi Memorial Intercontinental School (GMIS), formerly Gandhi Memorial International School, is a private international school with campuses in Jakarta, Bali, and Semarang, Indonesia. The primary campus, GMIS Jakarta, has more than 2,000 enrolled students from over 50 countries, largely Indonesian, Indian, Korean, and Chinese. It was established in 1950 alongside Gandhi School Ancol but relocated to Kemayoran, Central Jakarta in 2004.

Authorized in 1996, GMIS Jakarta was one of the first schools in Indonesia to gain the International Baccalaureate (IB) World School status. For its students from nursery through grade 12, the school offers the IB Primary Years Programme, IB Middle Years Programme, Cambridge IGCSE, the IB Diploma Programme, and the IB Career-related Programme. GMIS teaches IB and IGCSE curriculums as well as that of the Board of Secondary Education Indian Schools, Indonesia. It also teaches Pancasila as part of its mandatory syllabus for all students, and teaches Hindi, Indonesian, French, and Mandarin as its second languages. As of the academic year 2023–2024, the annual fees can range from roughly Rp. 48,510,000 to 140,000,000.

== History ==
GMIS Bali is situated in Renon, Denpasar and was established in 2007. It has nearly 500 students from over 30 countries. GMIS Semarang is the newest, having been established in 2015. The teaching faculty at all 3 campuses is primarily Indian and Indonesian.

GMIS Jakarta, GMIS Bali, and GMIS Semarang are 3 of the 6 schools that were created under the aegis of Gandhi Seva Loka (GSL). GSL is a non-profit organization that was founded in 1947 by Sindhis in Jakarta aiming not only to provide education through schools but also to spread Indian culture in Indonesia. The organization and the schools are named after Mahatma Gandhi.

The school changed its name to Gandhi Memorial Intercontinental School from Gandhi Memorial International School in 2015 to comply with the Indonesian government in their regulations prohibiting the use of the word "international" in school names.

Ashok Pal Singh, who had served as principal of GMIS Jakarta for 30 years, died on 25 October 2024. Suresh Arora, principal of GMIS Semarang, died on 26 January 2025. On 21 January 2026, GMIS Jakarta appointed Manish Semwal as its new principal.

== Affiliations and accreditations ==
GMIS Jakarta was named an IB World School and was authorized to teach and test the IBDP in 1996, the MYP in 2004, the PYP in 2005, and the IBCP in 2016. The school has also been accredited by the University of Cambridge Local Examinations Syndicate (UCLES), UK (IGCSE, O-Level, and A-Level); the Board of Secondary Education Indian Schools, Indonesia (BSEISI); the Association of Indian Universities; the Australian Music Examinations Board, Melbourne; the University of Delhi; and the University of Mumbai.

GMIS Bali gained authorization to offer the IBDP, PYP, MYP, and IBCP in 2009, 2015, 2017, and 2019 respectively. The school is accredited by and affiliated with the UCLES and the BSEISI. GMIS Semarang is not currently an authorized IB school but offers IGCSE and the national curriculum.

== Facilities and activities ==
=== GMIS Jakarta ===
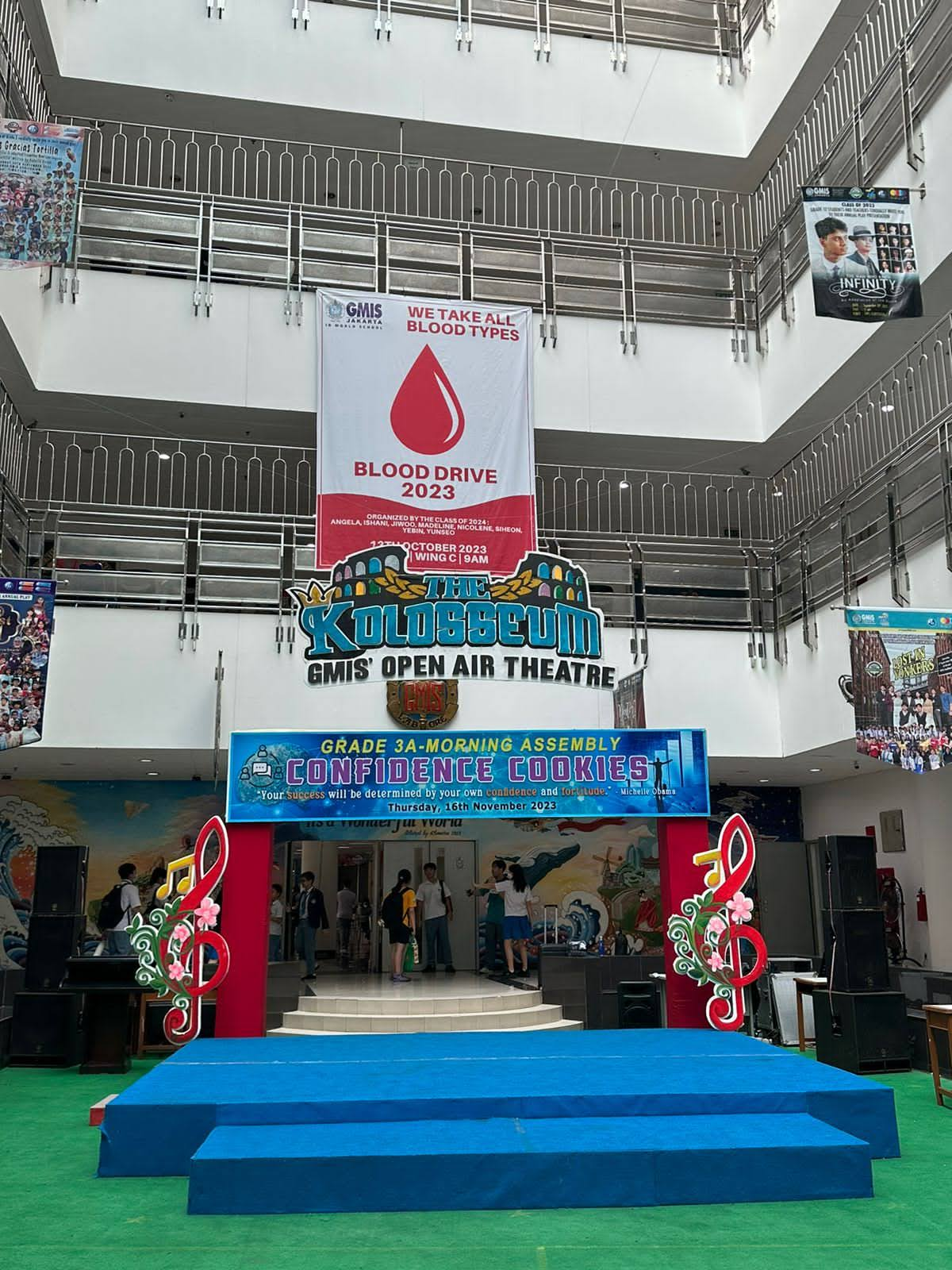
Wing C of GMIS Jakarta, with The Kolosseum

The main campus consists of two buildings: a main building with six floors and four wings (A, B, C and D), and a second building for additional classrooms and administration. Facilities are air-conditioned and include classrooms on every floor, an indoor assembly area, a canteen, a seated auditorium, a library, music rooms, science labs, computer labs, a seminar room, a gymnasium, a sports field, a swimming pool, a playground, and a clinic. In 2022, to facilitate more frequent assemblies, events, and performances—including TEDxYouth@GMIS in 2023—an open theatre called The Kolosseum was built in wing C. Additionally, a futsal court was built outside the canteen. These relatively new facilities are located on the ground floor, lending to increased accessibility and visibility as compared to the existing auditorium and gymnasium. The school provides free Wi-Fi access for registered students.

A second building, accessible through the second floor of the main building, is currently used for certain IB and IGCSE examinations as well as an administrative exam office. Formerly, its uses extended to classes and counseling sessions.

Co-curricular activities are typically organized by students in the name of developing their CAS portfolios but are also offered by the school. Such activities include clubs, extra classes (taekwondo, for example), talent shows, and sports events. Among the most notable student-organized activities is the Honor Cup futsal tournament with the 10th season in late 2026 being its most recent.

=== GMIS Bali ===
The Bali campus has air-conditioned classrooms with an emphasis on ergonomic furniture, as well as Wi-Fi connection throughout the school. Facilities include science labs, computer labs, and a language lab; a gymnasium with shower facilities; a multi-purpose hall with a movable stage and professional lighting and sound equipment; a seminar hall; a library and resource center; music rooms that stock conventional and Indonesian instruments; 4 arts and crafts rooms; an infirmary; an indoor swimming pool; a play area; and a food court.

Co-curricular activities are offered in the form of hobby and activity classes. Among the many, the school offers clubs for literature, information technology, yoga, home economics, Indonesian traditional music, western and Balinese dance, recycling, and Chinese culture. In addition to the conventional sports, the school also offers Wushu martial art and surfing classes.

== Notable alumni ==
- Manoj Punjabi, Indonesian entrepreneur and film producer
- Nadine Ames, Indonesian actress, model, philanthropist, and Puteri Indonesia 2010 titleholder who represented Indonesia in Miss Universe 2011
- Jharna Bhagwani, internet personality, makeup artist, and singer
