= Reisa Kartikasari =

Indonesian Royal Family member of Surakarta Sunanate

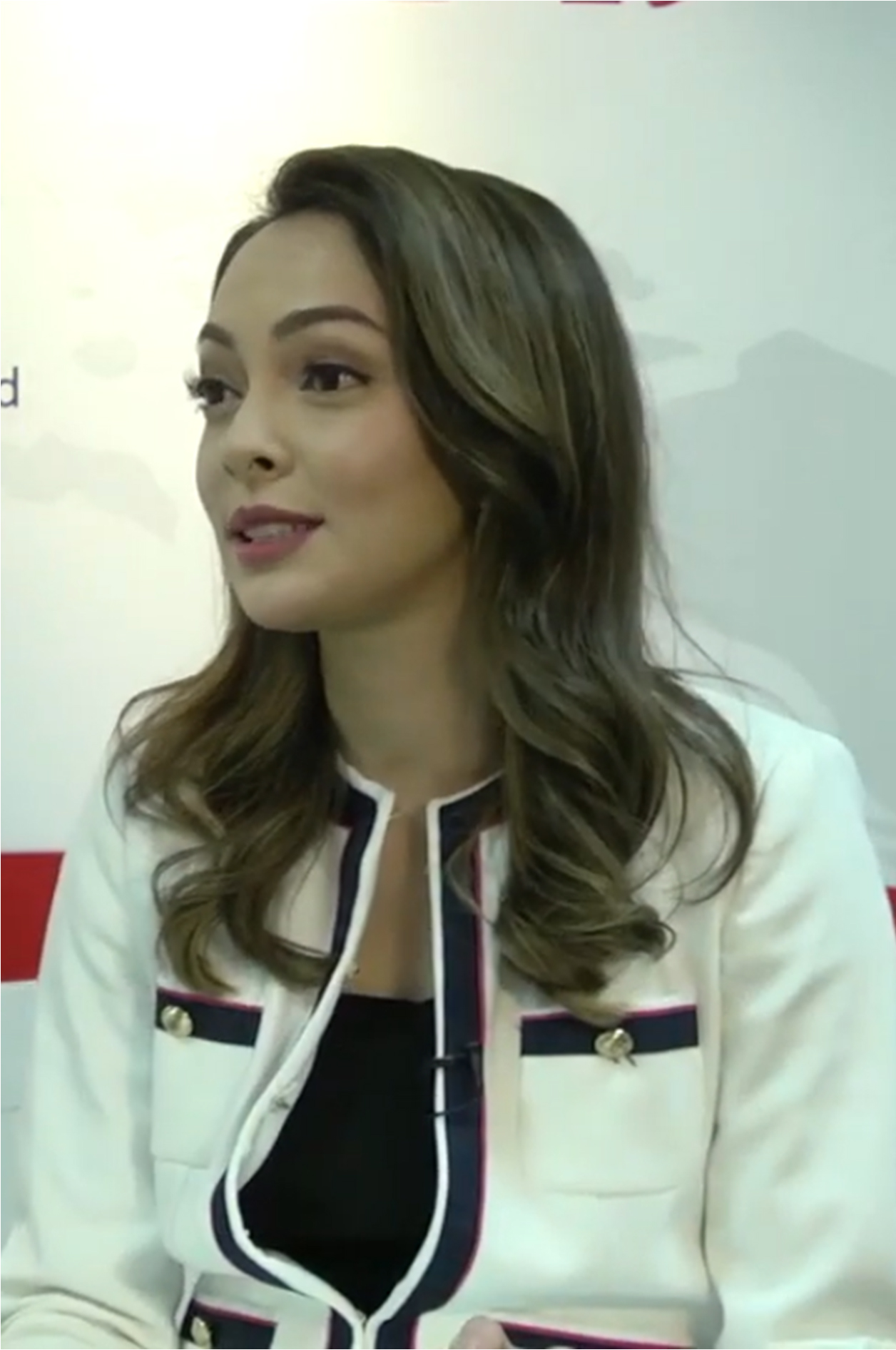
- Doctor Reisa Kartikasari as the Head of Communication for Indonesian COVID-19 Response Acceleration Task Force
- Born: Reisa Kartikasari; 25 December 1985 (age 40); Malang, East Java, Indonesia
- Education: Pelita Harapan University
- Height: 1.75 m (5 ft 9 in)
- Spouse: Tedjodiningrat Broto Asmoro (m. 2012)
- Children: 2
- Beauty pageant titleholder
- Title: Puteri Indonesia Lingkungan 2010; Miss International Indonesia 2011
- Hair color: Dark Brown
- Eye color: Dark Brown
- Major competitions: Puteri Indonesia 2010; (1st Runner-up – Puteri Indonesia Lingkungan); Miss International 2011; (Unplaced)
- Website: reisabrotoasmoro.com

Raden Kanjeng Mas Ayu Tumenggung Reisa Kartikasari Broto Asmoro (born 25 December 1985), is an Indonesian royal family member of Surakarta Sunanate, Head of Communication for Indonesian COVID-19 Response Acceleration Task Force, actress, doctor, talk show host and beauty pageant titleholder who was crowned Puteri Indonesia Lingkungan 2010. She represented Indonesia at the Miss International 2011 pageant.

== Personal life and career ==
Reisa holds a magister degree in medicine from the Faculty of Medicine of Pelita Harapan University and has worked as a model. She began her career when she was competing at Puteri Indonesia 2010 and she won the title of Puteri Indonesia Lingkungan 2010. In 2012, she married a prince from Surakarta, Prince of Hadiningrat, KP Tedjodiningrat Broto Asmoro.

In 2012, Reisa is married with Surakarta Sunanate prince, Tedjodiningrat Broto Asmoro, and she has two children, RR. Ramania Putri Broto Asmoro and R. Satriyo Daniswara Broto Asmoro. After her marriage, Reisa changed her name following her husband's last name, to become Reisa Broto Asmoro, endorsed by Indonesian civilian records. She has an older sister, Kanjeng Mas Ayu Tumenggung Dr. Dea Tunggaesti.SH.MM.

She was awarded "Duta Energi Bersih" for Indonesia and currently a leader of Ikatan Dokter Indonesia and work as a researcher for COVID-19 pandemic in Indonesia, selected by the President of Indonesia, Joko Widodo. In 2020, She was chosen as an National Head of Communication for The Indonesian COVID-19 Response Acceleration Task Force in Jakarta.

== Puteri Indonesia 2010 & Miss International 2011 ==
At 25 years old, Reisa competed in Puteri Indonesia beauty pageant, as the representative of Special Region of Yogyakarta province in Puteri Indonesia 2010. At the end of the competition, She won the title of Puteri Indonesia Lingkungan 2010, and she was automatically chosen to representing Indonesia on Miss International 2011 beauty pageant in Chengdu - China.

== Filmography ==
Since 2013, Dr. Reisa was hosting Dr. OZ Indonesia a franchise of American daytime television talk show The Dr. Oz Show. Each episode has segments on health, wellness and medical information, sometimes including true crime stories and celebrity interviews. It is produced and distributed by Trans Media Productions and Television.

=== Television programs ===
Year	Title	Genre	Role	Production	Ref.
2013–present	Dr. OZ Indonesia	talkshow	as Herself	Trans Media and CNBC Indonesia	

Awards and achievements
Preceded by Ayu Rianna Amardhi	Puteri Yogyakarta SR; 2010	Succeeded by Dinda Rizky Hutari
Preceded by Zukhriatul Hafizah Muhammad (West Sumatra)	Puteri Indonesia Lingkungan; 2010	Succeeded by Liza Elly Purnamasari (East Java)
