= Liza Elly Purnamasari =

Indonesian presenter, film actress, model

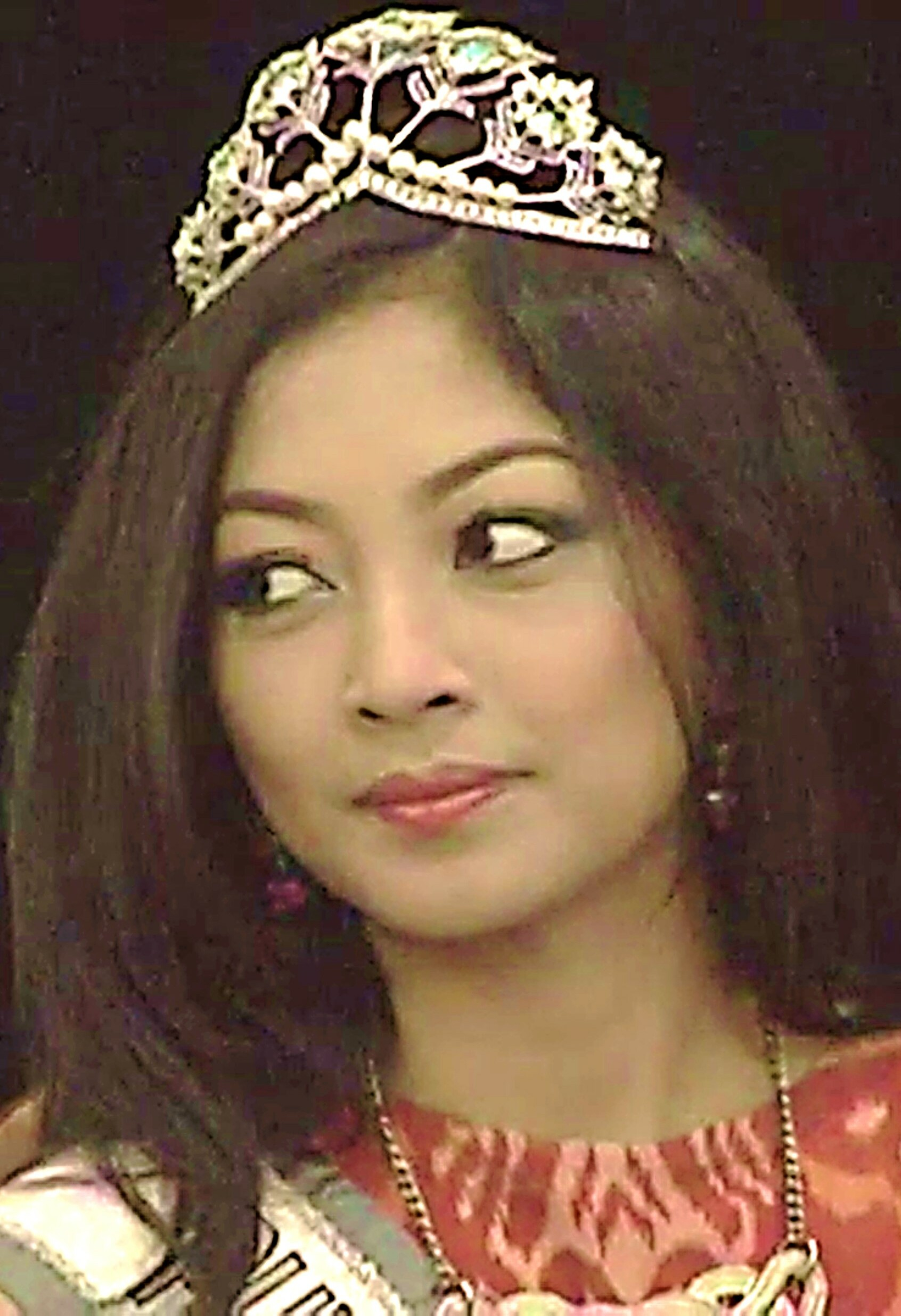
- Purnamasari in 2013
- Born: Fiorenza Liza Elly Purnamasari; 27 March 1991 (age 35); Malang, East Java
- Other name: Fiorenza Liza Purnama
- Education: STIKOM The London School of Public Relations
- Height: 1.75 m (5 ft 9 in)
- Spouse: Nicky Tirta (m. 2012; div. 2018)
- Beauty pageant titleholder
- Title: Miss Earth Indonesia 2010; Puteri Indonesia Lingkungan 2011; Miss International Indonesia 2012
- Hair color: Black
- Eye color: Black
- Major competitions: Miss Earth Indonesia 2010; (Winner); Puteri Indonesia 2011; (1st Runner-up – Puteri Indonesia Lingkungan); Miss International 2012; (Unplaced)

Fiorenza Liza Elly Purnamasari (born 27 March 1991) is an Indonesian presenter, model and beauty pageant titleholder who was crowned Puteri Indonesia Lingkungan 2011 and represented her country at the Miss International 2012 pageant.

== Personal life ==
Liza was born in Malang, East Java, Indonesia. She holds a bachelor degree in Marketing communications at STIKOM The London School of Public Relations in Jakarta. She is a television program presenter in Indonesia. In 2012 she married actor Nicky Tirta. They divorced in 2018.

== Pageantry ==
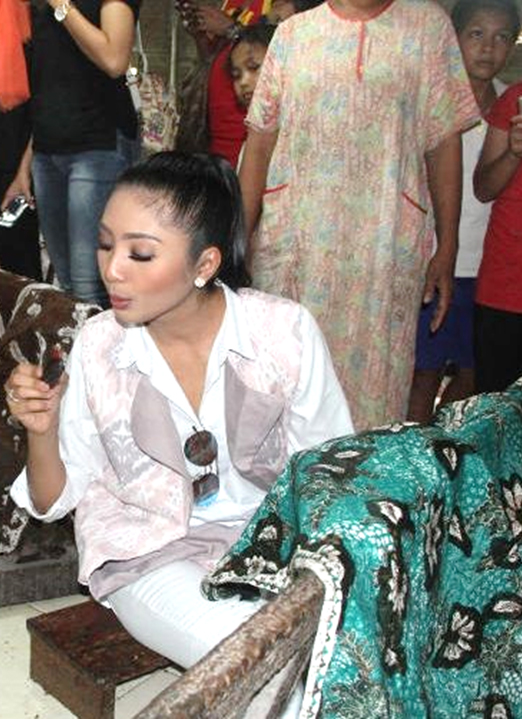
Liza during Hot Kiss travelling-trip scene at Rembang Regency.

=== Miss Indonesia Earth 2010 ===
Liza won the title of Miss Indonesia Earth in 2010. She was the official Indonesian representative at the Miss Earth 2010, but withdrew due unknown and unclear reasons by Miss Indonesia Earth Foundation. She was replaced by her runner-up, Jesicca Aurellia Tji, a few days before the competition was held in Nha Trang, Vietnam.

=== Puteri Indonesia 2011 ===
Liza represented East Java at Puteri Indonesia 2011, where she competed against thirty-seven other contestants from thirty-three provinces. She was crowned Puteri Indonesia Lingkungan, becoming the first delegate from East Java to win the Puteri Indonesia Lingkungan title.

=== Miss International 2012 ===
Liza represented Indonesia at Miss International 2012, held in Okinawa, Japan. She did not place among the Top 15 semifinalists.

== Filmography ==
Liza has presenting on her own several variety TV talk show.

=== Talk show ===
Year	Title	Genre	Role	Film Production	Ref.
2017–present	Hot Kiss	talk show	as Herself	Indosiar	
2017–present	Kiss Pagi	talk show	as Herself	Indosiar	

== See also ==
- Puteri Indonesia 2011
- Miss International 2012
- Maria Selena Nurcahya
- Andi Tenri Gusti Hanum Utari Natassa

Awards and achievements
Preceded by Betha Landes Kemala Sari	Puteri East Java; 2011	Succeeded by Asri Nofalya Kamalin
Preceded by Yogyakarta Special Region; Reisa Kartikasari Broto Asmoro	Puteri Indonesia Lingkungan; 2011	Succeeded by South Sumatra; Marisa Sartika Maladewi
