= Andi Tenri Natassa =

Indonesian model, actress and politician

- Born: Andi Tenri Gusti Hanum Utari Natassa; August 11, 1992 (age 34); Makassar, South Sulawesi, Indonesia
- Education: Swiss German University; South Westphalia University of Applied Sciences
- Occupations: Model; actress; TV presenter; beauty pageant titleholder
- Height: 171 cm (5 ft 7 in)
- Beauty pageant titleholder
- Title: Puteri Indonesia Pariwisata 2011; Miss Asia Pacific World Indonesia 2012
- Major competitions: Puteri Indonesia 2011; (2nd Runner-up – Puteri Indonesia Pariwisata 2011); Miss Asia Pacific World 2012; (Top 15)

Andi Tenri Gusti Hanum Utari Natassa (born 11 August 1992) is an Indonesian-Dutch politician who has served on the Indonesia People's Representative Council for South Sulawesi province since 2013 under Indonesian Unity Party. She has also worked as a model, actress and TV presenter, who won the title of Puteri Indonesia Pariwisata 2011. She represented Indonesia at the Miss Asia Pacific World 2012 pageant in Seoul, South Korea, where she placed in the Top 15 and also won Best National Costume.

== Early life and education ==
Natassa was born in Makassar, South Sulawesi, from a Dutch father, Andi Thaupan Oddang and Bugis mother, Dewie Yasmin Limpo Aryaliniza. She holds her Master of Business Administration from Faculty of Business of Swiss German University, Alam Sutera, Tangerang – Banten and South Westphalia University of Applied Sciences, North Rhine-Westphalia, Germany. In 2020, she married with Indonesian National Police officer Irwan Anwar.

== Pageantry ==
=== Puteri Indonesia 2011 ===
Natassa representing South Sulawesi on Puteri Indonesia 2011, where she was crowned as Puteri Indonesia Pariwisata 2011 at the grand finale held in Jakarta Convention Center, Jakarta, Indonesia on October 7, 2011, by the outgoing titleholder of Puteri Indonesia Pariwisata 2010, Alessandra Khadijah Usman of Gorontalo. She is also won Miss Favorite and Miss Talent awards.

=== Miss Asia Pacific World 2012 ===
As Puteri Indonesia Pariwisata 2011, Natassa represented Indonesia at the Miss Asia Pacific World 2012 pageant in held in Hallyuworld, Seoul, South Korea on June 16, 2012. At the grand finale coronation night, She ended up placed as one of the "Top 15 semifinalists", she is also won "Best National Costume Awards" and "2nd Runner-up Best Talent" at the pageant.

== See also ==
- Puteri Indonesia 2011
- Miss Asia Pacific World 2012
- Maria Selena Nurcahya
- Fiorenza Liza Elly Purnamasari

Awards and achievements
Preceded by Winanda Rahmayanti Rahman	Puteri South Sulawesi; 2011	Succeeded by Ayu Wahyuni Monalisa Paturusi
Preceded by Alessandra Usman (Gorontalo)	Puteri Indonesia; 2011	Succeeded by Cok Istri Krisnanda Widani (Bali)

Puteri Indonesia titleholders (2011)
Puteri Indonesia 2011 (Miss Universe Indonesia 2012); Central Java – Maria Selena Nurcahya	Puteri Indonesia Lingkungan 2011 (Miss International Indonesia 2012); East Java – Fiorenza Liza Elly Purnamasari	Puteri Indonesia Pariwisata 2011 (Miss Asia Pacific Indonesia 2012); South Sulawesi – Andi Tenri Gusti Hanum Utari Natassa
