= Qory Sandioriva =

Indonesian beauty contestant (born 1991)

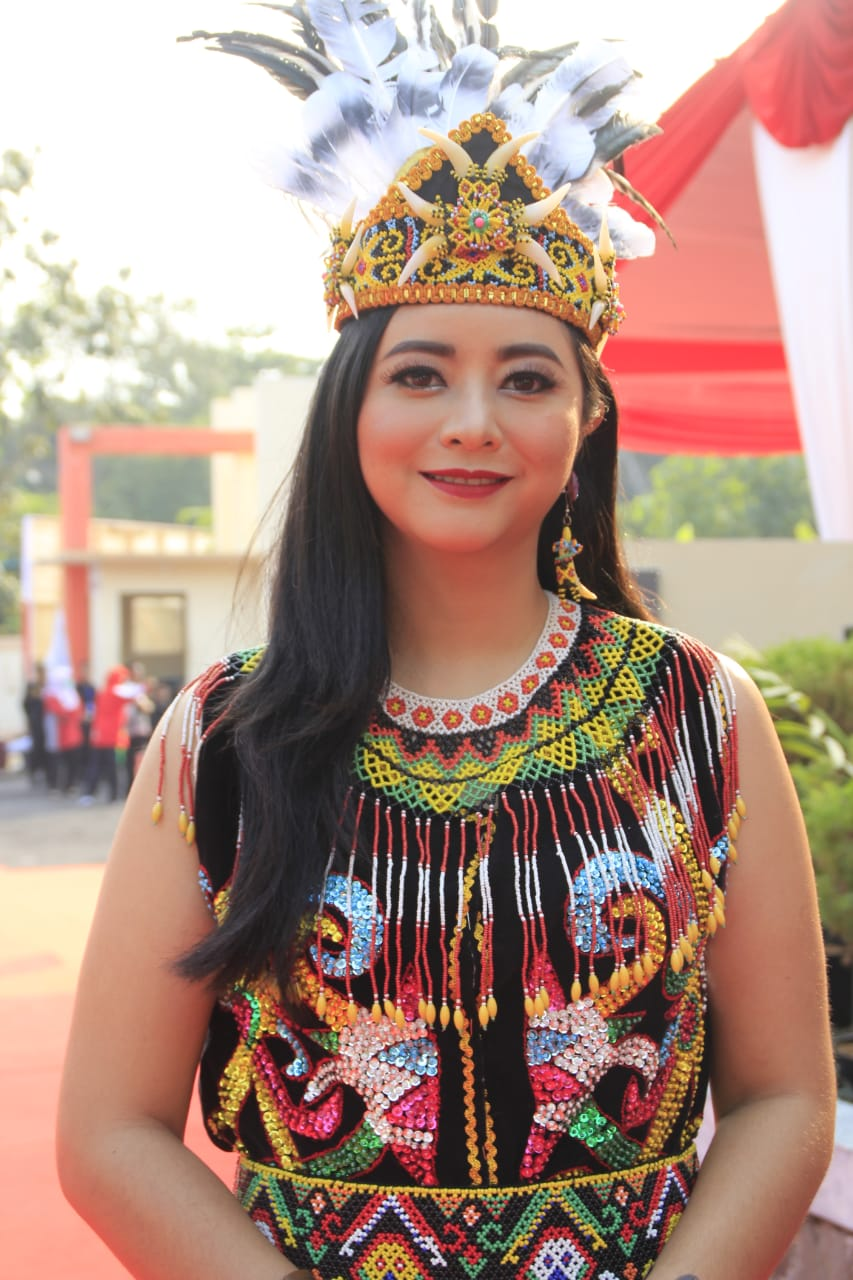
- Sandioriva for 2018 Asian Games Torch Relay Ceremony
- Born: Qory Sandioriva; 17 August 1991 (age 35); Jakarta, Indonesia
- Height: 1.73 m (5 ft 8 in)
- Spouses: Ramon Y. Tungka (m. 2012; div. 2018) Shah Rei Sukardi (m. 2020)
- Children: 1
- Beauty pageant titleholder
- Title: Puteri Indonesia 2009; Miss Universe Indonesia 2010
- Hair color: Black
- Eye color: Brown
- Major competitions: Puteri Indonesia 2009; (Winner); Miss Universe 2010; (Unplaced)

Qory Sandioriva (born 17 August 1991) is an Indonesian actress and beauty pageant titleholder. She was crowned as Puteri Indonesia 2009 on October 9, 2009 by her predecessor, Zivanna Letisha Siregar. She became the youngest titleholder in Puteri Indonesia's history and the first woman from Nanggroe Aceh Darussalam province to win the title.

== Early life ==
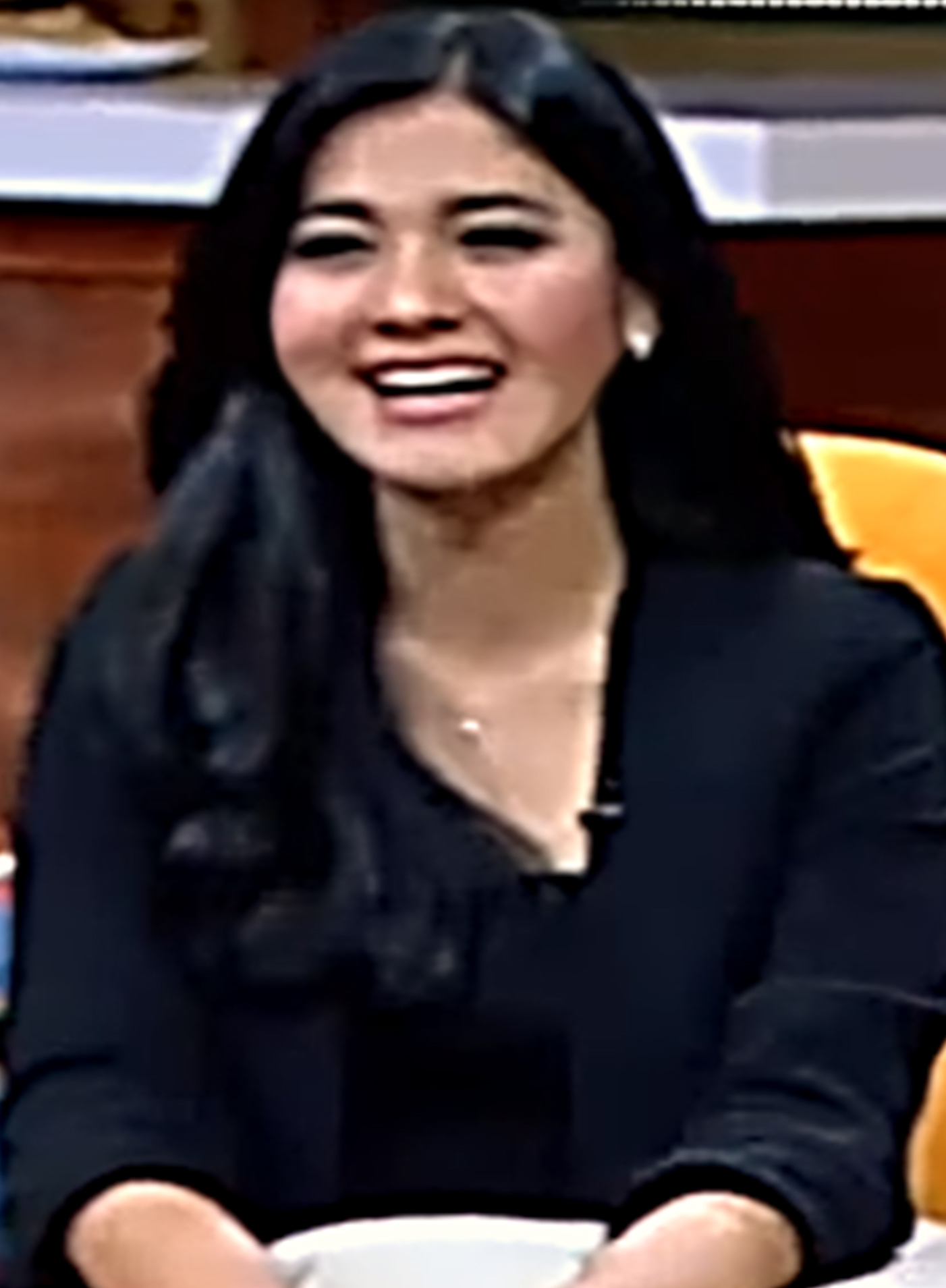
Sandioriva on NET. TV on 27 August 2017

Sandioriva was born in Jakarta to a Gayonese father and a Sundanese mother. She attended the Al-Azhar School for her elementary and secondary education. During high school, Sandioriva joined the Pencak silat and choir team of her school and won a choir competition. She studied at the University of Indonesia, majoring in French literature.

== Pageantry ==
=== Puteri Indonesia 2009 ===
Her participation in Puteri Indonesia 2009 was controversial because she was representing the province of Nanggroe Aceh Darussalam, a conservative Muslim province ruled by Sharia law. Past representatives of Nanggroe Aceh Darussalam had always worn a headscarf (hijab), but Sandioriva did not. Sandioriva later explained that despite not wearing a headscarf, she still upheld traditional values and morals – just like the Acehnese heroine she admired, Cut Nyak Dhien.

=== Miss Universe 2010 ===
As the official representative of her country to the 2010 Miss Universe pageant broadcast live from Las Vegas, Nevadaon August 23, Sandioriva participated as one of the 83 delegates who vied for the crown, eventually won by Ximena Navarrete of Mexico.

When asked what was the best advice she could give to a man, she said "I think when you down the women can make you up, and I think the women can be said that "I have advice for you" if you way up, you have to be nice with people, include women, so when you down, women can be nice with you." John Berthelsen of the Jakarta Globe said "Allowing for the fact that she speaks very little English, Sandioriva’s answer makes a certain amount of sense — put simply, that men should recognize that if you occupy a lofty position, you’d better be nice because when you sink, you will need people’s help."

== Filmography ==
=== Films ===
Year	Title	Genre	Role	Film Production	Ref.
2011	Purple Love	comedy movies	as Lisa	Kharisma StarVision	
2012	Mother Keder: Emakku Ajaib Bener	comedy film	as Vivi	CNS Pictures	
2018	Dancing in the Rain	romance film	as Banyu Teacher	Screenplay Films	

Awards and achievements
Preceded by Shinta Alvionita	Puteri Aceh; 2009	Succeeded by Juliana Puspita
Preceded by Jakarta SCR 6 – Zivanna Letisha Siregar	Puteri Indonesia; 2009	Succeeded by Jakarta SCR 4 – Nadine Ames
