= Maria Selena Nurcahya =

Miss Universe Indonesia 2012, Indonesian actress

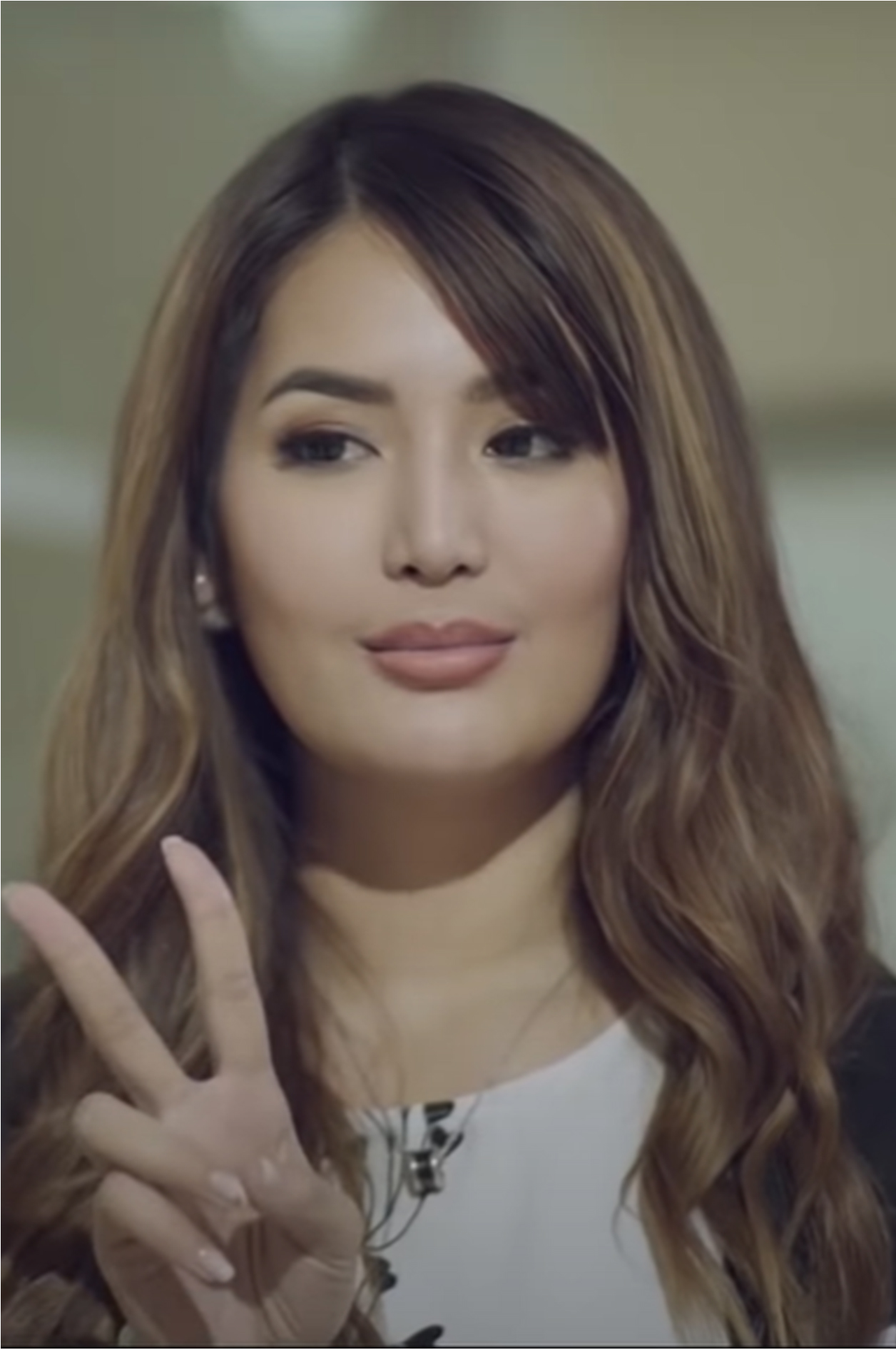
- Maria Selena Nurcahya, Miss Universe Indonesia 2012 acting on "Kesempurnaan Cinta Season 3" Soap Opera Drama
- Born: Maria Selena Nurcahya; 24 September 1990 (age 36); Palembang, South Sumatra, Indonesia
- Height: 1.77 m (5 ft 9 1/2 in)
- Beauty pageant titleholder
- Title: Puteri Indonesia 2011; Miss Universe Indonesia 2012
- Hair color: Brown
- Eye color: Black
- Major competitions: Puteri Indonesia 2011; (Winner); Miss Universe 2012; (Unplaced)

Maria Selena Nurcahya (born 24 September 1990), known as Maria Selena, is an Indonesian actress and beauty pageant titleholder who was crowned Puteri Indonesia 2011 and represented her country at the Miss Universe 2012 pageant. She represented Central Java in the Pemilihan Puteri Indonesia 2011.

== Early career ==
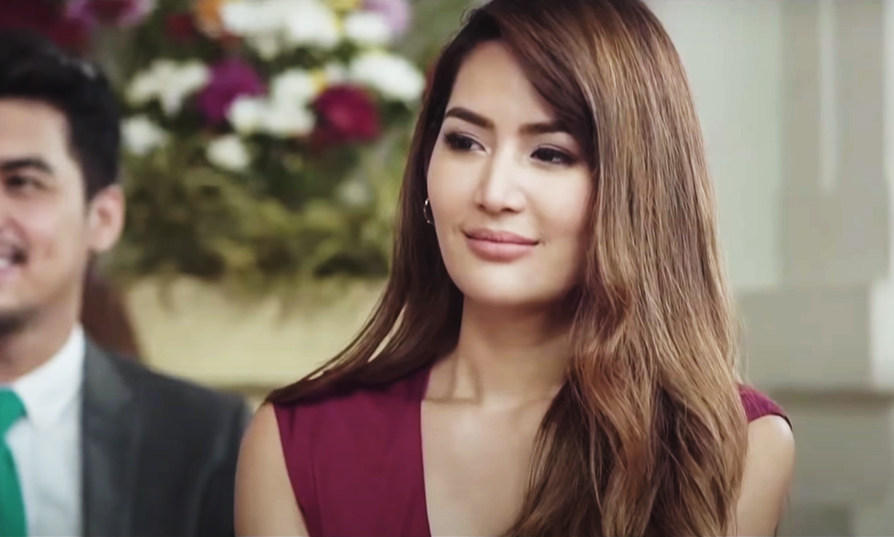
Maria acting on Kesempurnaan Cinta Season 3, NET. TV.

After the reign she decided to join Indonesian Basketball League as she grew up as a basketball player. Maria Selena made a debut in WNBL Indonesia with Surabaya Fever, then she signed with Merah Putih Predators Jakarta on her second season. She graduated and has a degree majoring in Business from Bandung Institute of Technology. Recently, Maria Selena is working with Persatuan Bola Basket Indonesia and INASGOC for 2018 Asian Games. She is well known as an actress and TV presenter.

== Pageantry ==
=== Puteri Indonesia 2011 ===
Selena, who stands 1.77 m (5 ft 9 1/2 in), competed as the representative of Central Java. Selena and the other 37 contestants from 33 provinces competed for the title. She is the second woman from Central Java to win the Puteri Indonesia title. The first one was Agni Pratistha in 2006.

=== Miss Universe 2012 ===
As the winner of Puteri Indonesia 2011, Selena represented Indonesia in Miss Universe 2012.

== Filmography ==
=== Movies ===
Year	Title	Genre	Role	Film Production	Ref.
2014	Danau Hitam	horror film	as Sophie	Jose Poernomo	

=== TV Films ===
Year	Title	Genre	Role	TV Network	Ref.
2016	Kesempurnaan Cinta	as Hana	Limelight Pictures	NET. TV	
2020	Aku Hanya Ingin Dicintai	as Aurel	Verona Pictures	ANTV	

=== Web shows ===
Year	Title	Role	Notes	Ref.
2025	Physical: Asia	Contestant	Team Indonesia	

== See also ==
- Puteri Indonesia 2011
- Miss Universe 2012
- Fiorenza Liza Elly Purnamasari
- Andi Tenri Gusti Hanum Utari Natassa

Awards and achievements
Preceded by Emanuella Gunawan	Puteri Central Java; 2011	Succeeded by Rachel Georghea
Preceded by Jakarta SCR 4 – Nadine Ames	Puteri Indonesia; 2011	Succeeded by West Sumatra – Whulandary Herman
