= Duma Riris Silalahi =

Miss International Indonesia 2008

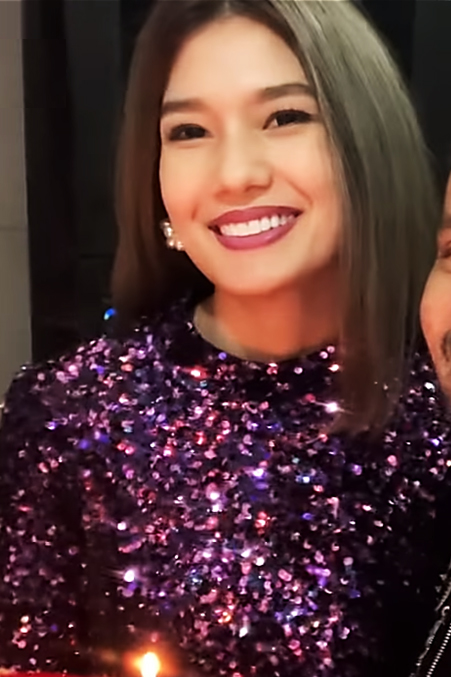
- Duma Riris Silalahi in 2021
- Born: September 20, 1983 (age 43); Medan, North Sumatra, Indonesia
- Education: University of North Sumatra
- Occupations: actress; singer; fashion model; Beauty pageant titleholders
- Height: 171 cm (5 ft 7 in)
- Spouse: Judika Nalon Abadi Sihotang (m. 2013)
- Children: 2: (Cleo Deora Boru Sihotang; Judeo Volante Sihotang.)
- Beauty pageant titleholder
- Title: Puteri Indonesia Sumatera Utara 2007; Puteri Indonesia Lingkungan 2007; Miss International Indonesia 2008
- Hair color: Black
- Eye color: Brown
- Major competitions: Puteri Indonesia Sumatera Utara 2007; (Winner); Puteri Indonesia 2007; (1st Runner-up – Puteri Indonesia Lingkungan 2007); Miss International 2008; (Unplaced)

Duma Riris Silalahi (born September 20, 1983) popularly known as Duma Riris is an Indonesian actress, singer, fashion model, and beauty pageant titleholder who won the title of Puteri Indonesia Lingkungan 2007. She represented Indonesia at the Miss International 2008 pageant in Macau.

== Early life and education ==
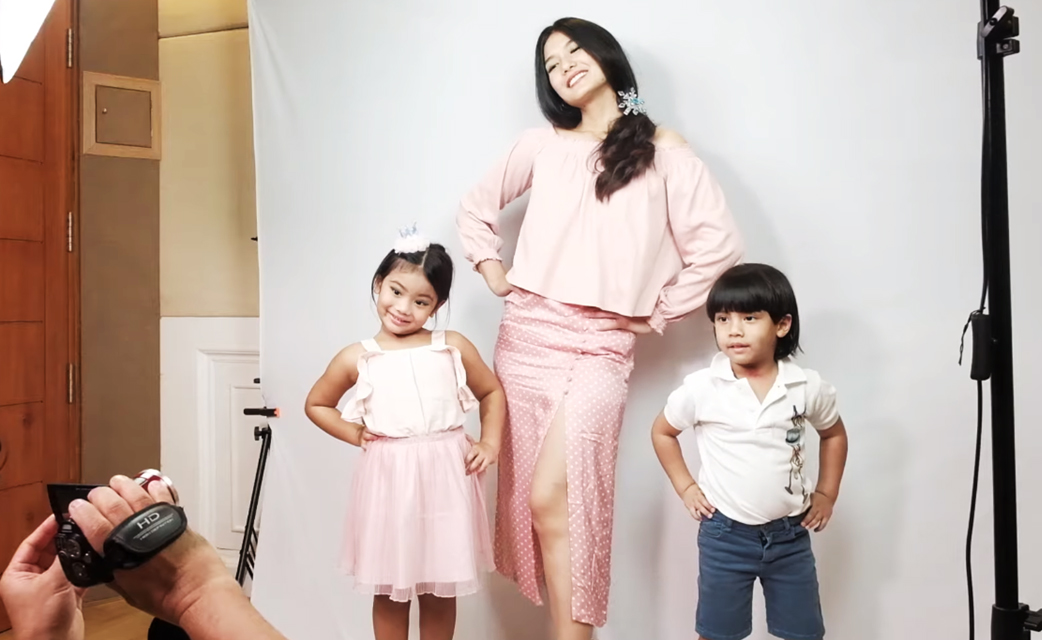
Duma together with her children Cleo (left) and Judeo (right) in 2020.

Duma was born on 20 September 1983 in Medan, North Sumatra province – Indonesia to parents of Batak descent. Duma holds a bachelor's degree in Business Management from the University of North Sumatra, Medan, North Sumatra, Indonesia. Since she was 13 years old, she joined several modeling competitions for magazines, such as Femina (Indonesia), and Jakarta Fashion Week Model Search, and won the cover shoot model in 2006.

On 31 August 2013, she married Indonesian Idol (season 2) runner-up and subsequent soloist singer Judika Nalon Abadi Sihotang. On 20 October 2014, Duma gave birth to a daughter, Cleo Deora Boru Sihotang and on 6 February 2016, to a son, Judeo Volante Sihotang.

== Pageantry ==
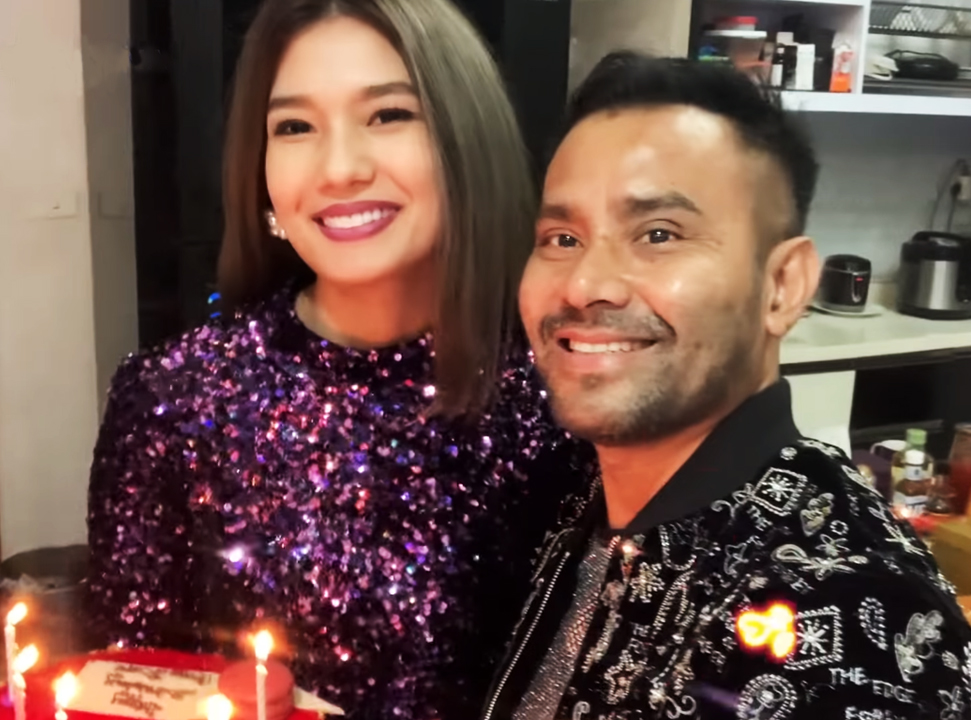
Duma with her husband, Indonesian soloist singer Judika Nalon Abadi Sihotang, in 2021.

=== Puteri North Sumatra 2007 ===
In 2007, Duma competed in the regional pageant of Puteri North Sumatra 2006 and ended up winning the title to represent her province North Sumatra in Puteri Indonesia 2007. She was crowned by the outgoing titleholder Isra Kartika Sari Sinaga.

=== Puteri Indonesia 2007 ===
At the age of 23, Duma joined the 12th annual Puteri Indonesia national beauty pageant. Duma was crowned as Puteri Indonesia Lingkungan 2007 at the grand finale held in Jakarta Convention Center, Jakarta, Indonesia on August 3, 2007, by the outgoing titleholder of Puteri Indonesia Lingkungan 2006 and Top 15 Miss International 2007, Rahma Landy Sjahruddin of Jakarta SCR 5. Duma represented her home province of North Sumatra at the pageant. Duma also first met her husband, Judika Nalon Abadi Sihotang during the Puteri Indonesia pageant in 2007.

=== Miss International 2008 ===
As Puteri Indonesia Lingkungan 2007, Duma represented Indonesia at the 48th edition of the Miss International 2008 pageant in held in The Venetian Macao, Macau. The finale was held on November 8, 2008. Priscila Perales of Mexico crowned her successor Alejandra Andreu of Spain by the end of the event.

== Filmography ==
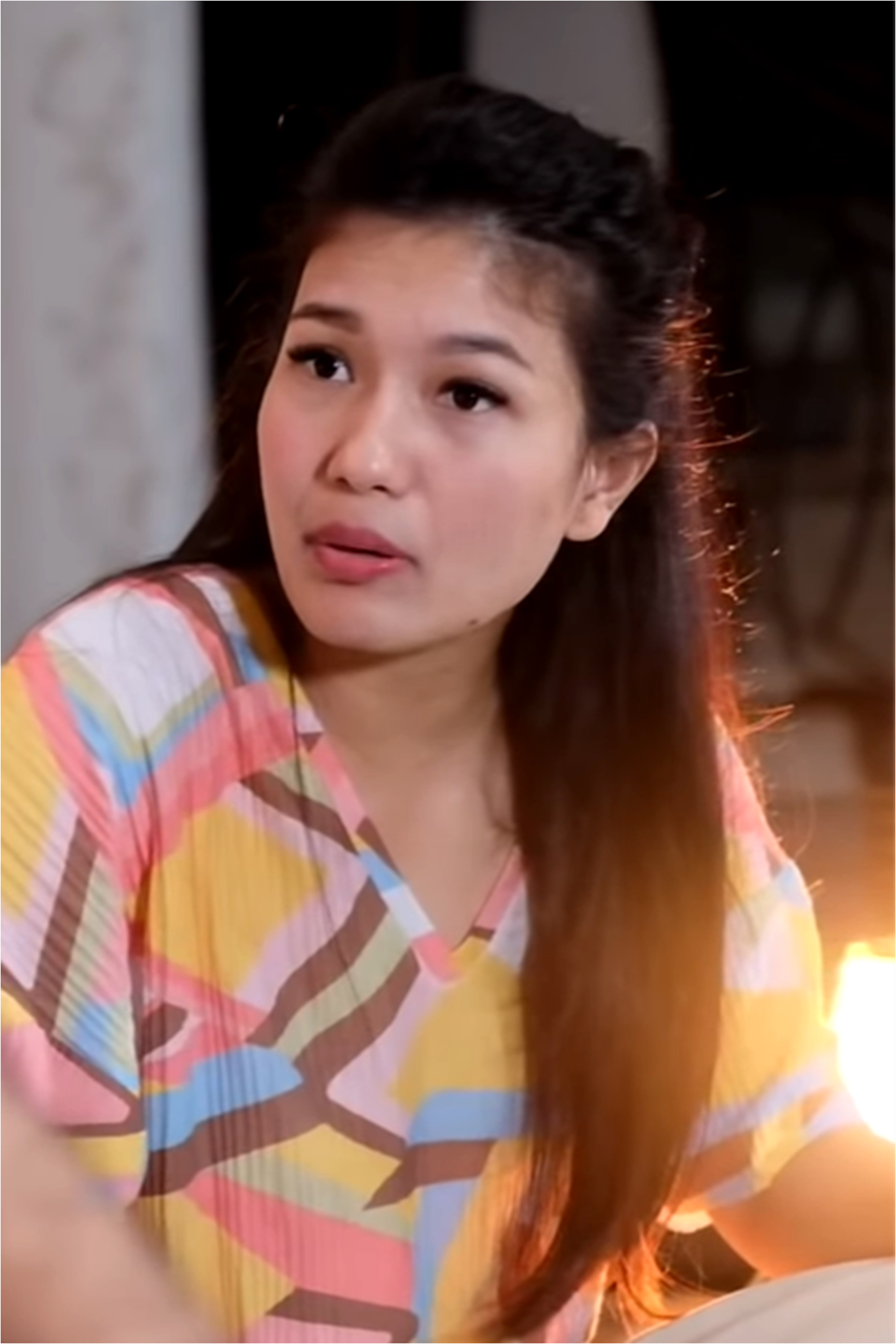
Duma acting as Mamak Cemana on Keluarga Cemana Show in 2020.

Duma has appeared in several music videos and movies. She has acted in television and film.

=== Movies ===
Year	Title	Genre	Role	Film Production	Ref.
2009	The Tarix Jabrix 2	comedy movies	as Duma	Kharisma StarVision	
2016	Uli, the Princess in Me	romance film	as Uli	CNS Pictures	

=== TV Films ===
Year	Title	Genre	Role	TV Network	Ref.
2019–present	Keluarga Cemana	comedy movies	as Mamak Cemana	NET. TV and YouTube	

=== Music videos ===
Year	Title	Role	Singer/Artist	Ref.
2013	Mencari Cinta (album) "Mencari Cinta"	as co-singer	Judika Sihotang feat. Duma Riris Silalahi	
2015	The Best of Judika "Sampai Akhir"	as co-singer	Judika Sihotang feat. Duma Riris Silalahi	

== See also ==
- Puteri Indonesia 2007
- Miss International
- Miss International 2008
- Gracia Putri Raemawasti

Awards and achievements
Preceded by Isra Kartika Sari Sinaga	Puteri North Sumatra; 2007	Succeeded by Raline Rahmat Shah
Preceded by Rahma Landy Sjahruddin (Jakarta SCR 5)	Puteri Indonesia Lingkungan; 2007	Succeeded by Ayu Diandra Sari Tjakra (Bali)
