= North Jakarta Intercultural School =

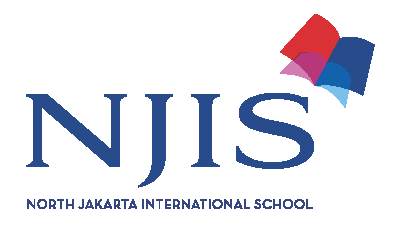

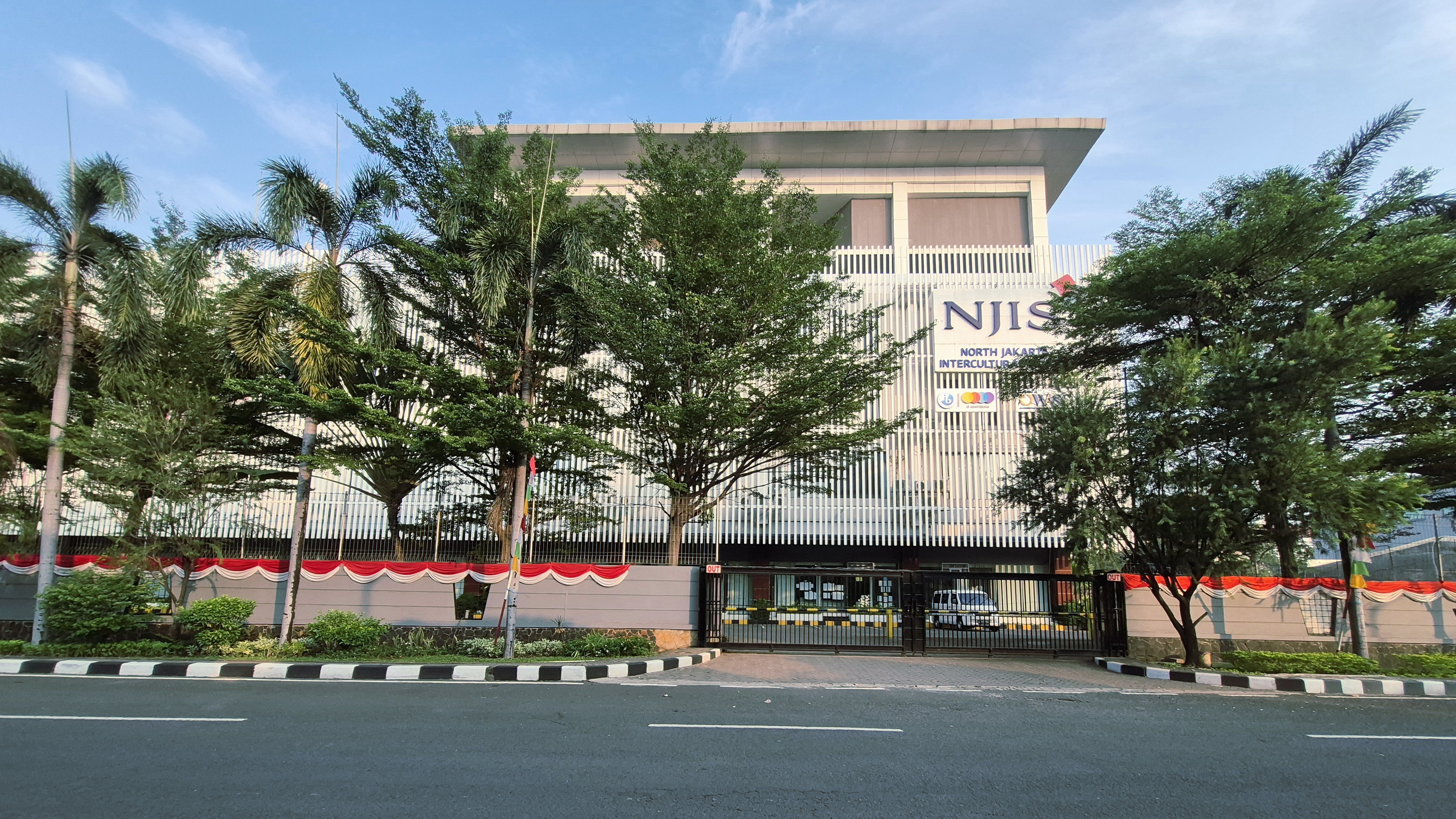

Location
- Jl. Boulevard Bukit Gading Raya; Kelapa Gading; Jakarta Utara, Indonesia, DKI Jakarta, 14240

Information
- School type: Private international school
- Established: 1990
- Head of school: Ezra Alexander
- Grades: Pre - kindergarten through Grade 12
- Age range: 4 to 18 years
- Language: English
- Classrooms: 24
- Campus size: 4.9 acres (20,000 m^{2})
- Mascot: NJIS Phoenixes
- School fees: $10,000-$22,200 per year
- Website: http://www.njis.org

North Jakarta Intercultural School (NJIS), formerly North Jakarta International School, is a private international school in Kelapa Gading, Jakarta, Indonesia. The school is an International Baccalaureate Continuum international school with an American orientation.

== History ==
NJIS was established in January 1990 and licensed by the Indonesian Ministry of Education to provide schooling for the children of expatriates and local residents residing in Jakarta. It is established as a Yayasan (not-for-profit social foundation) and operates as an independent, not-for-profit, co-educational day school for students in Pre-Kindergarten through Grade 12. NJIS is a member of the East Asia Regional Council of Schools (EARCOS). In 2021, North Jakarta Intercultural School was registered for the first time as an International Baccalaureate Continuum School, being accredited for Primary Years Programme, Middle Years Programme and the Diploma Programme. The school is also accredited by the Western Association of Schools and Colleges (WASC). High School Students have an option to earn the full International Baccalaureate Diploma, IB Courses with NJIS Diploma, or opt only for NJIS Diploma. The student body is made up of 266 students from 16 nationalities from Pre-k to Grade 12.

== Campus ==
In 2012 the school relocated to a 20.000 m2 new building on Jl.Boulevard Bukit Gading Raya, Kelapa Gading Jakarta Utara, Indonesia. Toll roads from west and south Jakarta are close to NJIS.
