= Puteri Indonesia 2007 =

12th Puteri Indonesia beauty pageant

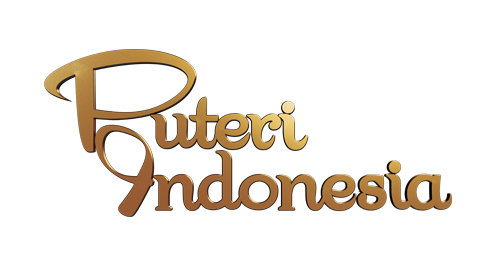
- Date: 3 August 2007
- Presenters: Ferdi Hasan and Nadia Mulya
- Entertainment: Agnes Monica
- Venue: Jakarta Convention Center, Jakarta
- Broadcaster: Indosiar
- Entrants: 36
- Placements: 10
- Withdrawals: Central Borneo, Nanggore Aceh Darussalam
- Winner: Putri Raemawasti; East Java

Puteri Indonesia 2007 (sometimes called Miss Indonesia Universe 2007) was 12th edition of Puteri Indonesia beauty pageant. It was held on 3 August 2007 in Jakarta Convention Center, Jakarta.

The hosts of the show were Ferdi Hasan and the First Runner Up of Puteri Indonesia 2004, Nadia Mulya. Putri Raemawasti from East Java won the contest and represented Indonesia at the Miss Universe 2008. Puteri Indonesia Lingkungan is Duma Riris Silalahi from North Sumatra and elected to Miss International 2008, Puteri Indonesia Pariwisata is Ika Fiyonda Putri from Jakarta and elected to Miss Tourism World 2008 (but canceled). The final coronation night was graced by the reigning Miss Universe 2007, Riyo Mori of Japan.

== Result ==
The Crowns of Puteri Indonesia Title Holders

Puteri Indonesia 2007 (Miss Universe Indonesia 2007)
Puteri Indonesia Lingkungan 2007 (Miss International Indonesia 2007)
Puteri Indonesia Pariwisata 2007 (Miss Tourism Indonesia 2007)

Final Results	Contestant
Puteri Indonesia 2007 (Miss Universe Indonesia)	East Java – Gracia Putri Raemawasti
Puteri Indonesia Lingkungan 2007 (Miss International Indonesia)	North Sumatra – Duma Riris Silalahi
Puteri Indonesia Pariwisata 2007 (Puteri Indonesia Runner-up)	Jakarta SCR 4 – Ika Fiyonda Putri
Top 5	Central Java – Elvaretta Nathania Gunawan; Jakarta SCR 2 – Tri Handayani
Top 10	Jakarta SCR 3 – Fitri Adityasari; Jakarta SCR 5 – Putri Widyasari; Papua – Christy Anggeline Jawiraka; West Kalimantan – Yulia Ramadayanti; West Sumatra – Milfa Yeni

== Contestants ==
- Bali – Fransisca Lidyawati
- Bangka Belitung – Sinta Septia Dewi
- Banten – Resa Puspita Rosliana
- Bengkulu – Rizky Anisa Mutiara
- Central Celebes – Sri Rifka Reski
- Central Java – Elvaretta Nathania Gunawan
- East Borneo – Dinia Marinka
- East Java – Putri Raemawasti
- East Nusa Tenggara – Rakhmania Ordha Wacana Pian
- Gorontalo – Yohanna Syamsia Kamaru
- Jakarta SCR 1 – Bona Dea Kometa
- Jakarta SCR 2 – Tri Handayani
- Jakarta SCR 3 – Fitri Adityasari
- Jakarta SCR 4 – Ika Fiyonda Putri
- Jakarta SCR 5 – Putri Widyasari
- Jakarta SCR 6 – Nona Evita
- Jambi – Silviana Puspita
- Lampung – Indah Mulyati
- Maluku – Evajune Tassa Rieuwpassa
- North Celebes – Ezra Margareth Pelealu
- North Maluku – Masyitah Lating
- North Sumatra – Duma Riris Silalahi
- Papua – Christy Anggeline Jawiraka
- Riau – Wella Mayangsari
- Riau Islands – Masyitah
- South Borneo – Ratih Ayu Wulandari
- South Celebes – Rezki Annisa
- South East Celebes – Yunita Triyana Nasruddin
- South Sumatra – Verawati Agustina
- West Borneo – Yulia Ramadayanti
- West Celebes – Nila Shanty
- West Java – Essy Prita Cinta
- West Nusa Tenggara – Nurfajrina
- West Papua – Theresia Ajeng Pratiwi
- West Sumatra – Milfa Yeni
- Yogyakarta – Denissa Marthatina
