= Puteri Indonesia 2009 =

14th Puteri Indonesia beauty pageant

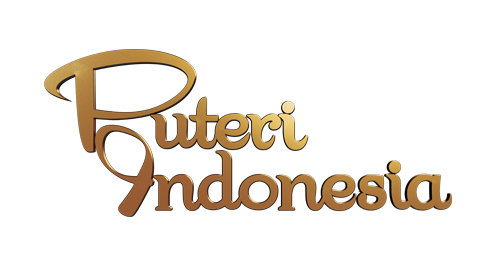
- Puteri Indonesia 2009 Title Card
- Date: October 9, 2009
- Venue: Teater Tanah Airku, Taman Mini Indonesia Indah, Jakarta, Indonesia
- Broadcaster: Indosiar
- Entrants: 38
- Placements: 10
- Winner: Qory Sandioriva; Aceh

The 14th Annual Puteri Indonesia (sometimes called Miss Indonesia Universe) Pageant, was held in Teater Tanah Airku, Taman Mini Indonesia Indah, Jakarta, Indonesia on Friday, October 9, 2009. Zivanna Letisha Siregar, Puteri Indonesia 2008 from Jakarta Special Capital Region 6 crowned her successor at the end of this event. About 38 contestants from 33 provinces competed for the title on the pageant that was broadcast live on Indosiar and live-streamed on selebtv.com and kompastv.com. Previously, Puteri Indonesia 2009 finalists underwent a quarantine period, from 28 Sept – October 8, 2009, at Hotel Nikko Jakarta. The Grand Final of Puteri Indonesia 2009 was attended by Miss Universe 2009 Stefania Fernandez. The winner of Puteri Indonesia 2009 was Qory Sandioriva, who represented Indonesia in Miss Universe 2010, Zukhriatul Hafizah represented Indonesia in Miss International 2010.

== Results ==
The Crowns of Puteri Indonesia Title Holders

Puteri Indonesia 2009 (Miss Universe Indonesia 2009)
Puteri Indonesia Lingkungan 2009 (Miss International Indonesia 2009)
Puteri Indonesia Pariwisata 2009 (Puteri Indonesia 2009 Runner-up)

Final Results	Contestant
Puteri Indonesia 2009 (Miss Universe Indonesia)	Aceh – Qory Sandioriva
Puteri Indonesia Lingkungan 2009 (Miss International Indonesia)	West Sumatra – Zukhriatul Hafizah
Puteri Indonesia Pariwisata 2009 (Puteri Indonesia Runner-up)	North Maluku – Isti Ayu Pratiwi
Top 5	Jakarta SCR 4 – Natalia Hermanto; Banten – Audrie Adriana Sanova
Top 10	South Sumatra – Sarinah Aria Putri; Jakarta SCR 6 – Coreana Agashi; West Java – Maya Nita; East Java – Nadia Zahara; West Papua – Tien Virginia Arisoi

== Contestants ==
38 delegates have been selected.

Province	Contestant	Age	Height(m)	Hometown
Aceh	Qory Sandioriva	18	175 cm (5 ft 9 in)	Jakarta
Bali	Ni Putu Sukmadewi Eka Utami	20	174 cm (5 ft 8 1/2 in)	Denpasar
Bangka Belitung	Survia	20	170 cm (5 ft 7 in)	West Bangka
Banten	Audrie Adriana Sanova	19	173 cm (5 ft 8 in)	Jakarta
Bengkulu	Tirta Diana Sari	22	169 cm (5 ft 6 1/2 in)	Bengkulu
Central Java	Testy Anggriani Maramis	22	172 cm (5 ft 7 1/2 in)	Semarang
Central Kalimantan	Imelda Madjat Djahari Timbang	18	167 cm (5 ft 5 1/2 in)	Palangkaraya
Central Sulawesi	Nisrin Zainuddin	18	166 cm (5 ft 5 1/2 in)	Palu
East Java	Nadia Zahara	23	174 cm (5 ft 8 1/2 in)	Surabaya
East Kalimantan	Grace Joselini Corlesa Setiawan	24	167 cm (5 ft 5 1/2 in)	Jakarta
East Nusa Tenggara	Donna Bella Permata Rissi	19	170 cm (5 ft 7 in)	Kupang
Gorontalo	Aluisha Saboe	21	171 cm (5 ft 7 1/2 in)	Bandung
Jakarta SCR 1	Putri Hapsari Mantik	23	172 cm (5 ft 7 1/2 in)	Jakarta
Jakarta SCR 2	Alexa Dhewwy	19	176 cm (5 ft 9 1/2 in)	Jakarta
Jakarta SCR 3	Feby Rizky Andhika Nasution	22	170 cm (5 ft 7 in)	Jakarta
Jakarta SCR 4	Natalia Pertiwi Hermanto	22	170 cm (5 ft 7 in)	Jakarta
Jakarta SCR 5	Fiona Euis Tjatriaty Callagan	24	170 cm (5 ft 7 in)	Jakarta
Jakarta SCR 6	Coreana Agashi	19	174 cm (5 ft 8 1/2 in)	Jakarta
Jambi	Cherlida Riyandani	21	169 cm (5 ft 6 1/2 in)	Jambi
Lampung	Feby Deliana	20	167 cm (5 ft 5 1/2 in)	Bandar Lampung
Maluku	Citra Fragrantia Theodorra Mailowa	25	168 cm (5 ft 6 in)	Jakarta
North Maluku	Isti Ayu Pratiwi	23	173.5 cm (5 ft 8 1/2 in)	Jakarta
North Sulawesi	Anastasia Margareth Runtunuwu	23	184 cm (6 ft 1/2 in)	Manado
North Sumatra	Fatimah Syahnur Lubis	25	172 cm (5 ft 7 1/2 in)	Medan
Papua	Dela Pria Silvia Werinussa	21	172 cm (5 ft 7 1/2 in)	Jayapura
Riau	Medy Chairani	22	170 cm (5 ft 7 in)	Pekanbaru
Riau Islands	Serly Ernawati	19	165 cm (5 ft 5 in)	Batam
Southeast Sulawesi	Diza Ayu Fildzah	18	170 cm (5 ft 7 in)	Baubau
South Kalimantan	Patricia Vanessa	21	173 cm (5 ft 8 in)	Banjarmasin
South Sulawesi	Rini Lindrayani	21	168 cm (5 ft 6 in)	Bone
South Sumatra	Sarinah Aria Putri	20	174 cm (5 ft 8 1/2 in)	Palembang
West Java	Maya Nita	20	176 cm (5 ft 9 1/2 in)	Bandung
West Kalimantan	Karlina Yulianava	23	170 cm (5 ft 7 in)	Jakarta
West Nusa Tenggara	Meyza Mawarila Jamil	18	171 cm (5 ft 7 1/2 in)	Mataram
West Papua	Tien Virginia Vanessa Arisoi	23	172 cm (5 ft 7 1/2 in)	Yapen
West Sulawesi	Astri Wardani	20	171 cm (5 ft 7 1/2 in)	Jakarta
West Sumatra	Zukhriatul Hafizah	22	172 cm (5 ft 7 1/2 in)	Jakarta
Yogyakarta Special Region	Ayu Rianna Amardhi	21	174 cm (5 ft 8 1/2 in)	Yogyakarta

== Replacements ==
- Papua: Marcelina D Rahawarin actually was crowned Puteri Indonesia Papua 2009 on June 1, 2009. But she was replaced by 1st runner up Puteri Indonesia Papua 2009 Dela Pria Silvia Werinussa.
