= Zivanna Letisha Siregar =

Indonesian actress, TV host, model, book writer and Miss Universe Indonesia 2009

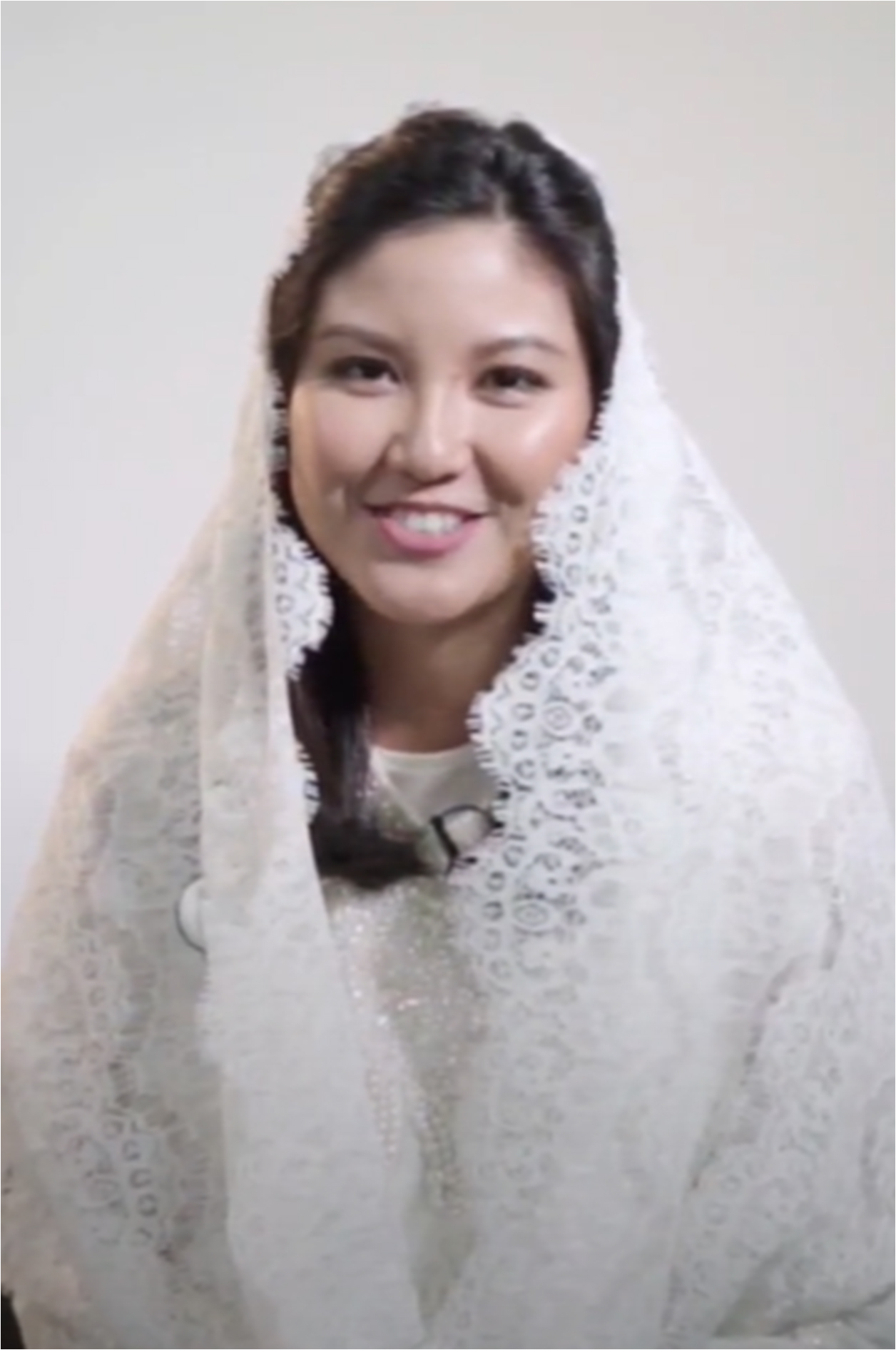
- Siregar for Quran Indonesia Project in 2018 wearing Selendang
- Born: 16 February 1989 (age 37); Jakarta, Indonesia
- Education: University of Indonesia
- Occupations: Talk show host; book writer; philanthropist; model; beauty pageant titleholder
- Spouse: Haries Argareza Harahap (m. 2016)
- Children: 1
- Beauty pageant titleholder
- Title: Puteri Indonesia 2008; Miss Universe Indonesia 2009
- Hair color: Black
- Eye color: Brown
- Major competitions: Puteri Indonesia 2008; (Winner); Miss Universe 2009; (Unplaced)

Zivanna Letisha Siregar (born 16 February 1989) is an Indonesian talk show host, book writer, philanthropist, model and beauty pageant titleholder who won Puteri Indonesia 2008, She represented Indonesia at Miss Universe 2009 Pageant in Atlantis Paradise Island, Nassau, Bahamas, where she didn't make the Top 15, but she won the "Miss Popularity" award.

== Early life and career ==
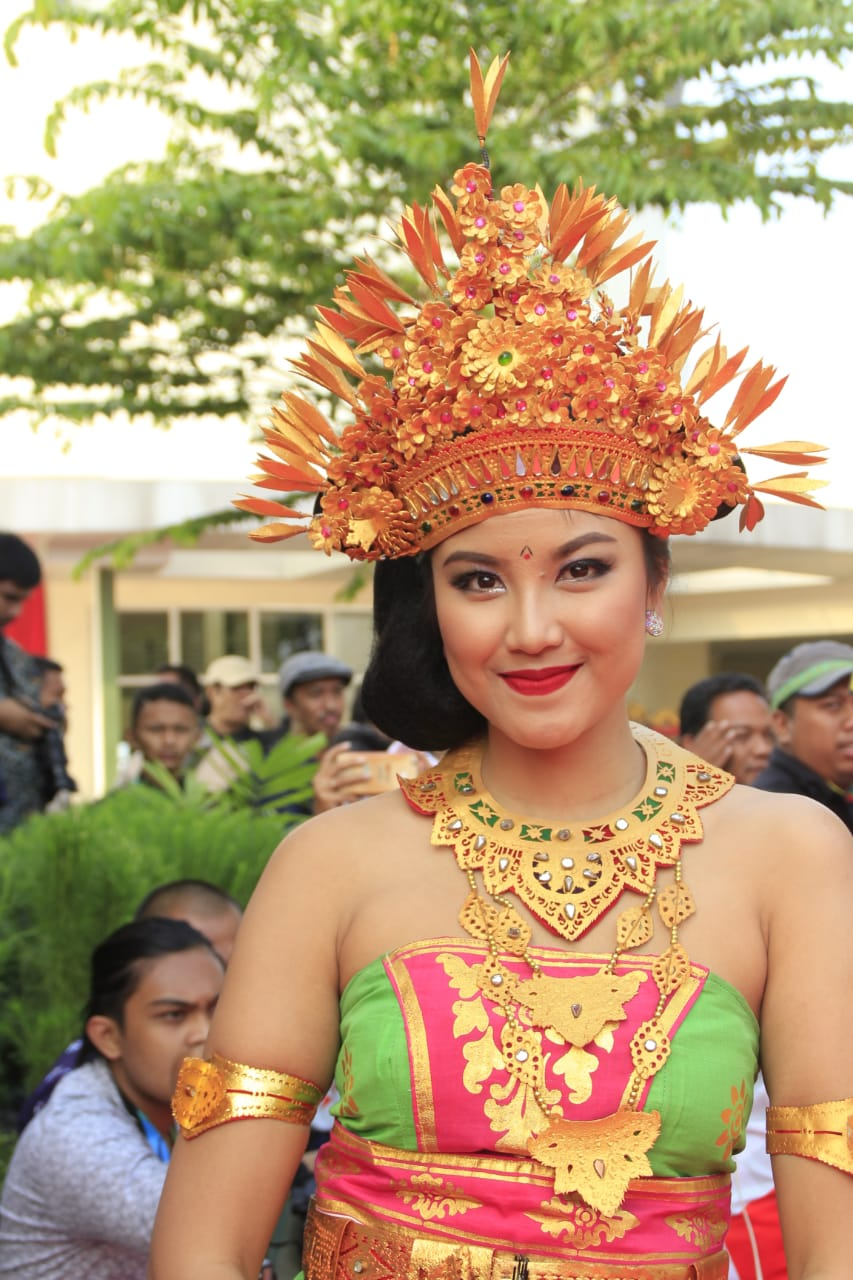
Zivanna wearing traditional Balinese dress, during 2018 Asian Games torch relay on 18 July 2018.

Born in Jakarta, Indonesia, with the Batak and Sundanese background from her parents, she is the former winner of Elite Model Look Indonesia, and competed in Elite Model Look Asia Pacific 2006 in China. On 2007, she is finished High School at Al-Izhar Pondok Labu - Jakarta. She holds a Bachelor of Economics from University of Indonesia.

She is currently working as a news presenter on Indonesian TV station NET.TV and she is eager to become a movie star. There have been some offers, but she has rejected them because she doesn't like the roles.

Beside work as a presenter, on 2 September 2012 Zivanna was chosen as the "Ambassador for Orangutans", visiting the Orangutan Foundation International’s - Orangutan Care Center and Quarantine in Pasir Panjang as well as Camp Leakey in Tanjung Puting National Park to publicize the plight of wild orangutan populations and their habitat, tropical rain forest, in Sumatra and Borneo. During her visit she interviewed Dr. Birute Galdikas, President of OFI, for television. Zivanna is fluent in both Indonesian and English.

Zivanna is also work as a content and book writer published by Elex Media Komputindo, known to have just completed her second book titled "Trik Juara Mengatur Waktu (Champion Trick to Set a Time)" which was released on April 22, 2016. Previously, she also released her first best selling book in 2013 "Buku Pintar Cewek Juara (Guide Book of a Woman Champion)".

On 21 February 2016, She is married to Indonesian businessman Haries Argareza Harahap in Dharmawangsa Hotel - Jakarta. and giving birth her only son, Ryoji Ibrahim Harahap in November 16, 2017. On 18 July 2018, President of Indonesia - Joko Widodo, appointed Zivanna to be a Pendet dancer, wearing traditional Balinese dress, for the opening ceremony of 2018 Asian Games torch relay in Grobogan Regency, Central Java - Indonesia.

== Pageantry ==
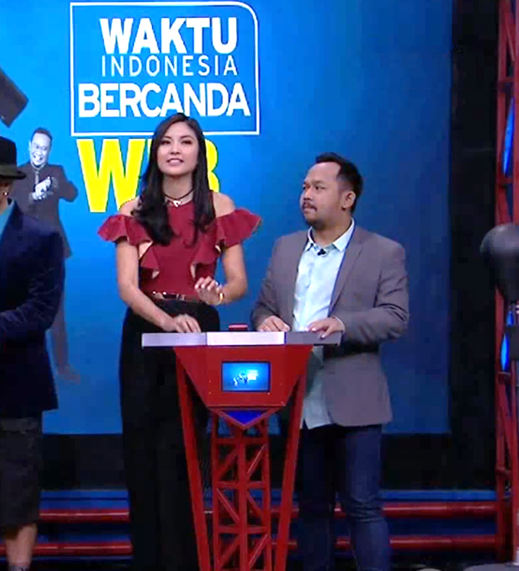
Zivanna With Comedian Bedu On NET.TV.

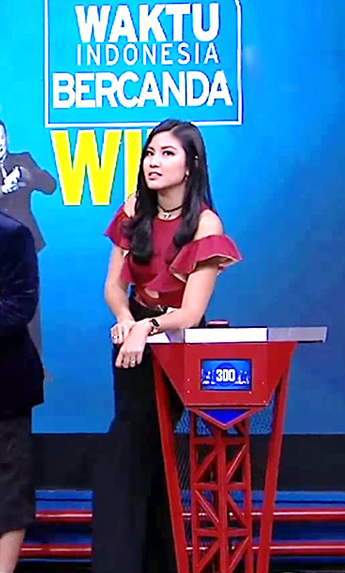
Zivanna on Waktu Indonesia Bercanda, NET.TV in 20 February 2017.

=== Puteri Indonesia 2008 ===
At the age of 19, Zivanna started her world of pageantry by joining the 13th edition of Puteri Indonesia beauty pageant. She represented Jakarta SCR 6 in the Puteri Indonesia 2008 pageant, and was crowned on 15 August 2008 succeeding her predecessor, Putri Raemawasti of East Java, in the Jakarta Convention Center.

=== Miss Universe 2009 ===
Zivanna represented Indonesia in Miss Universe 2009 at the Atlantis Paradise Island, Nassau, the Bahamas. Zivanna was failed to place in the semifinals, but she ended won "Miss Popularity (Fan-vote)" award.

== Filmography ==
Zivanna has presenting on several variety talk show.

=== Talk show ===
Year	Title	Genre	Role	Film Production	Ref.
2016–present	Indonesia Morning Show	talk show	as herself	NET.TV	
2011–present	Liputan 6 Sore	talk show	as herself	SCTV	

== Famous relatives ==
- Alexander Siregar, physicist working on Cabal theory
- Merari Siregar, Indonesian writer and novelist

Awards and achievements
Preceded by Nona Evita	Puteri Jakarta SCR 6; 2008	Succeeded by Coreana Agashi
Preceded by Putri Raemawasti (East Java)	Puteri Indonesia; 2008	Succeeded by Qory Sandioriva (Aceh)
