= Puteri Indonesia 2010 =

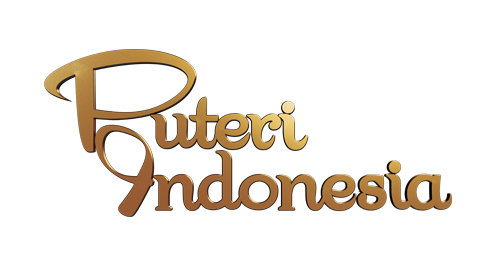
- Date: October 8, 2010
- Presenters: Choky Sitohang, Nadia Mulya, Rahma Landy, Zivanna Letisha Siregar
- Entertainment: Christopher Abimanyu, Andra and the BackBone, Trio Audrey Cantika Gamaliel
- Venue: Jakarta Convention Center, Jakarta, Indonesia
- Broadcaster: Indosiar
- Entrants: 38
- Placements: 10
- Winner: Nadine Ames; Jakarta SCR 4

Puteri Indonesia 2010, the 15th Annual Puteri Indonesia beauty pageant, was held in Jakarta Convention Center, Jakarta, Indonesia on October 8, 2010. Thirty eight contestants from all 33 provinces of Indonesia competed for the title of Puteri Indonesia, one of the most prominent beauty pageant titles in the country. Qory Sandioriva, Puteri Indonesia 2009 from Aceh crowned her successor Nadine Alexandra Dewi Ames of Jakarta SCR 4 at Assembly Hall, Jakarta Convention Center, Jakarta. Ames is going to represent Indonesia at the Miss Universe 2011 in São Paulo, Brazil, while the first and second runners-up will represent the nation at the Miss International 2011 and the Miss Asia Pacific World 2011 respectively.

The event was broadcast live on Indonesian television network, Indosiar. Indonesian Minister for Female Empowerment and Child Protection, Linda Gumelar, as well as Ximena Navarrete, Miss Universe 2010, was present during the event.

== Results ==
The Crowns of Puteri Indonesia Title Holders

Puteri Indonesia 2010 (Miss Universe Indonesia 2010)
Puteri Indonesia Lingkungan 2010 (Miss International Indonesia 2010)
Puteri Indonesia Pariwisata 2010 (Miss Asia Pacific Indonesia 2010)

Final Results	Contestant	International Placement
Puteri Indonesia 2010 (Miss Universe Indonesia)	Jakarta SCR 4: Nadine Alexandra Dewi Ames	Unplaced – Miss Universe 2011
Puteri Indonesia Lingkungan 2010 (Miss International Indonesia)	Yogyakarta Special Region: Reisa Kartikasari	Unplaced – Miss International 2011
Puteri Indonesia Pariwisata 2010 (Miss Asia Pacific Indonesia)	Gorontalo: Alessandra Khadijah Usman	1st Runner-up – Miss Asia Pacific World 2011
Top 5	Bali - Ida Ayu Dwita Sukma Ari Pramana; Jambi - Grace Gabriella Binowo	
Top 10	Central Java - Emanuella Chrisnatasha Gunawan; Jakarta SCR 6 - Inda Endaliani; Jakarta SCR 5 - Marietta Gabriel Gladys Levina; Maluku - Mythia Dyah Rengganis; West Sumatra - Rika Pertiwi Zulfi	

== Contestants ==
Province	Delegate	Age	Height (cm)	Hometown
Aceh	Juliana Puspita	23	167 cm (5 ft 5 1/2 in)	Sigli
North Sumatra	Cut Nabila Azhar	19	171 cm (5 ft 7 1/2 in)	Medan
West Sumatra	Rika Pertiwi Zulfi	23	174 cm (5 ft 8 1/2 in)	Padang
Riau	Mega Dwi Lestari	19	170 cm (5 ft 7 in)	Pekanbaru
Riau Islands	Gloria Daniela Pasaribu	22	171 cm (5 ft 7 1/2 in)	Batam
Jambi	Grace Gabriella Binowo	19	173 cm (5 ft 8 in)	Jambi
South Sumatra	Ega Selviana Sarfawi	22	180 cm (5 ft 11 in)	Palembang
Bangka-Belitung Islands	Juwita Anggraini	19	172 cm (5 ft 7 1/2 in)	Tanjung Pandan
Bengkulu	Seradona Altiria	20	172 cm (5 ft 7 1/2 in)	Bengkulu
Lampung	Lilian Putri Kurniawan	25	171 cm (5 ft 7 1/2 in)	Bandar Lampung
Jakarta Special Capital Region 1	Faradina Alattas	22	174 cm (5 ft 8 1/2 in)	Jakarta
Jakarta Special Capital Region 2	Okki Rianiayu Anjani	23	170 cm (5 ft 7 in)	Jakarta
Jakarta Special Capital Region 3	Aisya Adiputri	22	179 cm (5 ft 10 1/2 in)	Jakarta
Jakarta Special Capital Region 4	Nadine Alexandra Dewi Ames	19	173 cm (5 ft 8 in)	Jakarta
Jakarta Special Capital Region 5	Marietta Gabriel Gladys Levina	19	171 cm (5 ft 7 1/2 in)	Jakarta
Jakarta Special Capital Region 6	Inda Endaliani	21	170 cm (5 ft 7 in)	Jakarta
Banten	Yovita Agustine Lesmana	25	170 cm (5 ft 7 in)	Tangerang
West Java	Kalia Labitta Yudhasoka	18	169 cm (5 ft 6 1/2 in)	Bandung
Central Java	Emanuella Chrisnatasha Gunawan	21	177 cm (5 ft 9 1/2 in)	Semarang
Yogyakarta Special Region	Reisa Kartikasari	24	174 cm (5 ft 8 1/2 in)	Yogyakarta
East Java	Betha Landes Kemala Sari	22	167 cm (5 ft 5 1/2 in)	Malang
Bali	Ida Ayu Dwita Sukma Ari Pramana	20	173 cm (5 ft 8 in)	Denpasar
West Nusa Tenggara	Frizka Devirani	19	173 cm (5 ft 8 in)	Mataram
East Nusa Tenggara	Freska Gousario	22	170 cm (5 ft 7 in)	Kupang
West Kalimantan	Benedikta Thia	19	171 cm (5 ft 7 1/2 in)	Sintang
South Kalimantan	Wenty Widiyar Pratami	22	166 cm (5 ft 5 1/2 in)	Banjarbaru
Central Kalimantan	Aelyn Halim	23	169 cm (5 ft 6 1/2 in)	Palangkaraya
East Kalimantan	Ayu Rinda Sari	24	168 cm (5 ft 6 in)	Bontang
South Sulawesi	Winanda Rahmayanti Rahman	19	167 cm (5 ft 5 1/2 in)	Palopo
West Sulawesi	Andi Tenri Pakkua	20	171 cm (5 ft 7 1/2 in)	Polewali Mandar
Southeast Sulawesi	Mayang Sandy Utami	18	170 cm (5 ft 7 in)	Bombana
Central Sulawesi	Lenny Kumalasari	18	170 cm (5 ft 7 in)	Palu
North Sulawesi	Astrid Tatumpe	23	171 cm (5 ft 7 1/2 in)	Manado
Gorontalo	Alessandra Khadijah Usman	22	171 cm (5 ft 7 1/2 in)	Gorontalo
Maluku	Mythia Dyah Rengganis	21	172 cm (5 ft 7 1/2 in)	Bandanaira
North Maluku	Syahadia Robo	22	168 cm (5 ft 6 in)	Ternate
Papua	Oifance Elmerilia Falentin Sanggenafa Imbiri	20	171 cm (5 ft 7 1/2 in)	Waropen
West Papua	Rully Chintya Ronsumbre	18	171 cm (5 ft 7 1/2 in)	Sorong

== See also ==
- Miss Indonesia 2010
