= Puteri Indonesia 2008 =

13th Puteri Indonesia beauty pageant

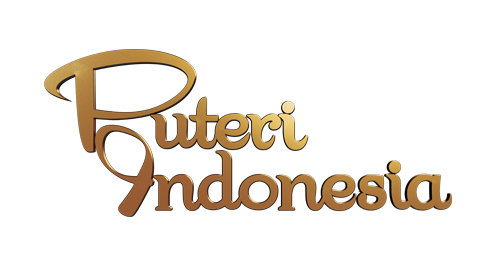
- Date: 15 August 2008
- Venue: Jakarta Convention Center, Jakarta, Indonesia
- Entrants: 38
- Winner: Zivanna Letisha Siregar; DKI Jakarta 6

Puteri Indonesia 2008 (sometimes called Miss Indonesia Universe 2008) was the 13th edition of Puteri Indonesia beauty pageant. The grand final election was held in the Plenary Hall, Jakarta Convention Center, Jakarta, on the evening of 15 August 2008. The event was sponsored by Charles Bonar Sirait, Choky Sitohang (1st runner-up Puteri Indonesia 2004), Nadia Mulya, and Melanie Putria Dewita Sari (Puteri Indonesia 2002).

Puteri Indonesia 2008 was won by Zivanna Letisha Siregar (DKI Jakarta 6). She represented Indonesia in Miss Universe 2009 where she failed to enter the Top 15. Representatives of Indonesia had not placed in the Top 10 since 1974. The first runner-up (Puteri Indonesia Environment) was Ayu Diandra Sari Tjakra. She represented Indonesia in Miss International 2009. Second runner-up (Puteri Indonesia Tourism) was Anggi Mahesti. She represented Indonesia in Miss Tourism Queen International 2009.

== Results ==
The Crowns of Puteri Indonesia Title Holders

Puteri Indonesia 2008 (Miss Universe Indonesia 2008)
Puteri Indonesia Lingkungan 2008 (Miss International Indonesia 2008)
Puteri Indonesia Pariwisata 2008 (Miss Tourism Queen Indonesia 2008)

Final Results	Contestant
Puteri Indonesia 2008 (Miss Universe Indonesia)	Jakarta SCR 6 – Zivanna Letisha Siregar
Puteri Indonesia Lingkungan 2008 (Miss International Indonesia)	Bali – Ayu Diandra Sari Tjakra'
Puteri Indonesia Pariwisata 2008 (Miss Tourism Queen Indonesia)	Yogyakarta Special Region – Anggi Mahesti
Top 5	North Sumatra: Raline Shah; Jakarta SCR 1 : Ajeng Patria Meilisa
Top 10	Jakarta SCR 3 : Amanda Putri Witdarmono; North Sulawesi: Dian Wulan Paramitha Suling Murniadi; Gorontalo:Citra Isramij Pedju; Jakarta SCR 4 : Isabelle Laura Lucon; East Java: Yustin Karina

== Contestants ==
- Aceh – Shinta Alvionita As
- Bali – Ayu Diandra Sari Tjakra
- Bangka Belitung – Sarah Yunizka
- Banten – Vanessa Ariesca Setrawan
- Bengkulu – Kom Diah Cempaka Sari
- Central Borneo – Veronica Octadewi Taradifa
- Central Celebes – Ayu Wandira
- Central Java – Wima Eka Mutiara
- DKI Jakarta 1 – Ajeng Patria Meilisa
- DKI Jakarta 2 – Alisa Octabiyanti
- DKI Jakarta 3 – Amanda Putri Witdarmono
- DKI Jakarta 4 – Isabelle Laura Lucon
- DKI Jakarta 5 – Merry Halim
- DKI Jakarta 6 – Zivanna Letisha Siregar
- East Borneo – Andina Kamaluddin
- East Java – Yustin Karina
- East Nusa Tenggara – Merlyn Yacoba Kartika Bolla
- Gorontalo – Citra Isramij Pedju
- Jambi – Dewynda Restu Amelya Syarief
- Lampung – Maria Laura Eugenia
- Maluku – Sendyria Leatemia
- North Celebes – Dian Wulan Paramita Suling Murniadi
- North Maluku – Indah Alawiah Pratiwi
- North Sumatra – Raline Rahmat Shah
- Papua – Novita Kristy Krey
- Riau – Citra Ratu Pratama
- Riau Islands – Sarah Devina
- South Borneo – Annisa Shinta Rapika Sari
- South Celebes – Sri Anggun Pratiwi Hiasyah
- South East Celebes – Wa Ode Widya Nita
- South Sumatra – Sylvia Ibrahim Manan
- West Borneo – Hema Kometa Zuriad
- West Celebes – Ni Wayan Ayu Dewi Parwati
- West Java – Astri Megatari
- West Nusa Tenggara – Evhy Apryani
- West Papua – Berka Sawal
- West Sumatra – Emilia Slamat
- Yogyakarta – Anggi Mahesti
