= Gresya Maaliwuga =

Indonesian actress, presenter, model, and beauty pageant titleholder

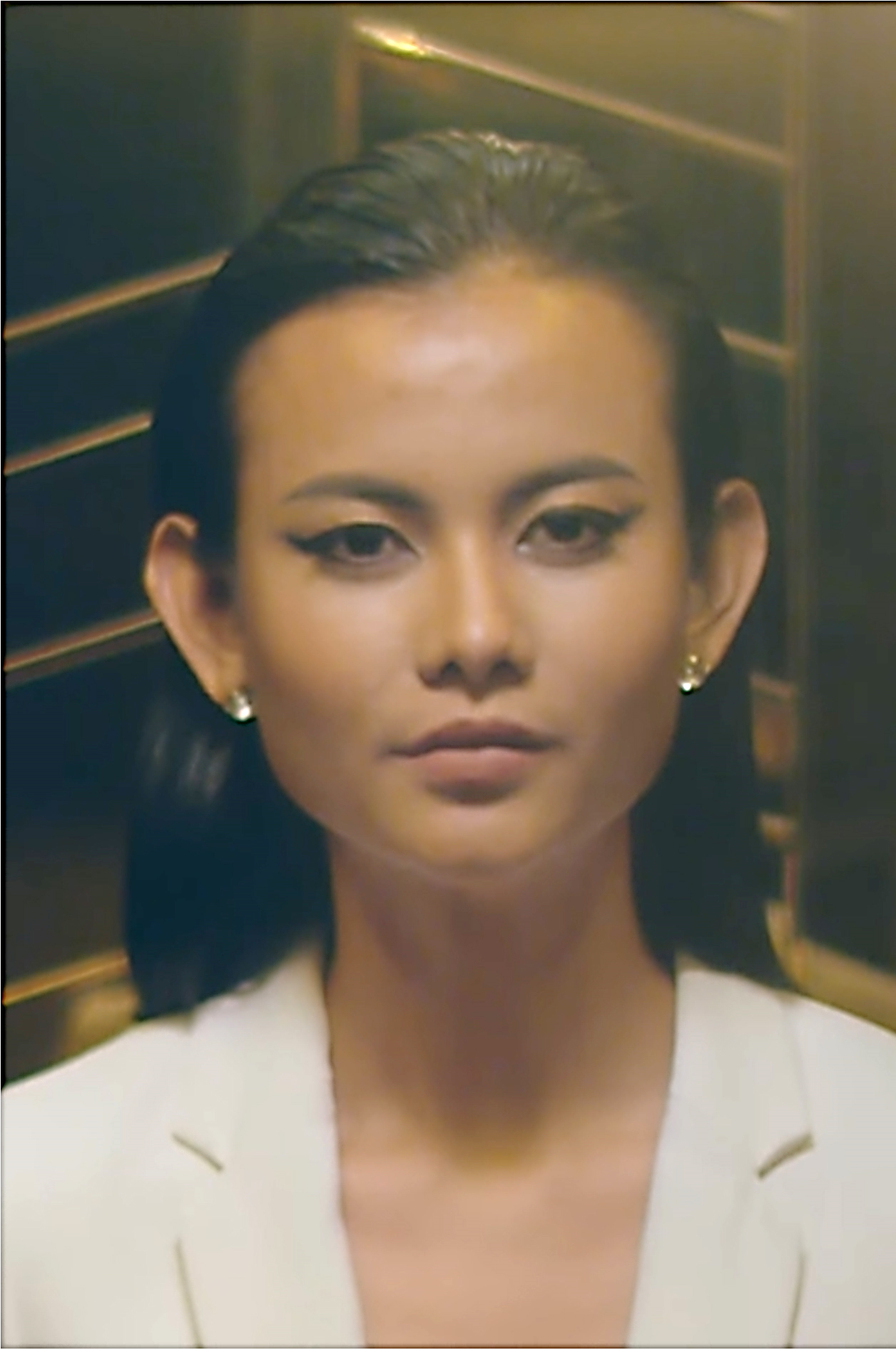
- Maaliwuga in 2020
- Born: 27 May 1995 (age 31); Ternate, North Maluku, Indonesia
- Education: STIE Eben Haezer Manado (Bachelor of Business Accounting and Finance)
- Occupations: Indonesian Ministry of Tourism Ambassador; Indonesian Ministry of Education and Culture Ambassador.; Actress; Presenter; Model
- Years active: 2016-present
- Title: Puteri Indonesia Pariwisata 2015; Miss Supranational Indonesia 2015
- Modeling information
- Height: 1.75 m (5 ft 9 in)
- Hair color: Black
- Eye color: Black

Gresya Amanda Maaliwuga (born 27 May 1995) is an Indonesian Ministry of Education and Culture Ambassador, Indonesian Ministry of Tourism Ambassador, actress, Presenter, TV commercial model and a beauty pageant titleholder who won the title of Puteri Indonesia Pariwisata 2015, She represented Indonesia at the Miss Supranational 2015 pageant and finished as Top 24 and won "Best National Costume" award, designed by Jember Fashion Carnaval. Gresya became the second Indonesian to be placed as a finalist in Miss Supranational history, after Cok Istri Krisnanda Widani placement in 2013.

== Personal life and education ==
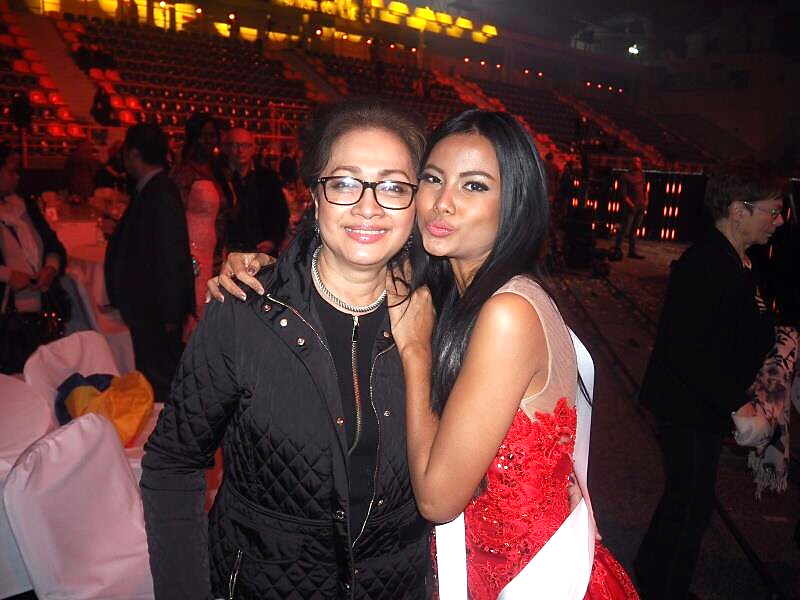
Gresya (right) together with her aunt during Miss Supranational 2015 competition.

Gresya was born in Ternate, North Maluku, Indonesia, on 27 May 1995 to a traditional Minahasan family background. When at 7 her parents was divorced and she was raised by her maternal grandparents in Manado, North Sulawesi - Indonesia. She was finishing her secondary study in SMAN 1 Manado and holds a bachelor's degree on Business accounting and finance from TIE Eben Haezer in Manado, North Sulawesi, Indonesia.

on 2015-2016 She was part of The Puteri Indonesia Queens, batch 2015, since she was 15 Gresya work as a beauty influencer. Gresya is a child education advocate, she is helping to build a school and internet access especially those in rural area by working together with the Ministry of Education and Culture of The Republic of Indonesia and on 30 July 2016 Gresya was appointed as the Indonesian Ministry of Education and Culture Ambassador.

== Pageantry ==
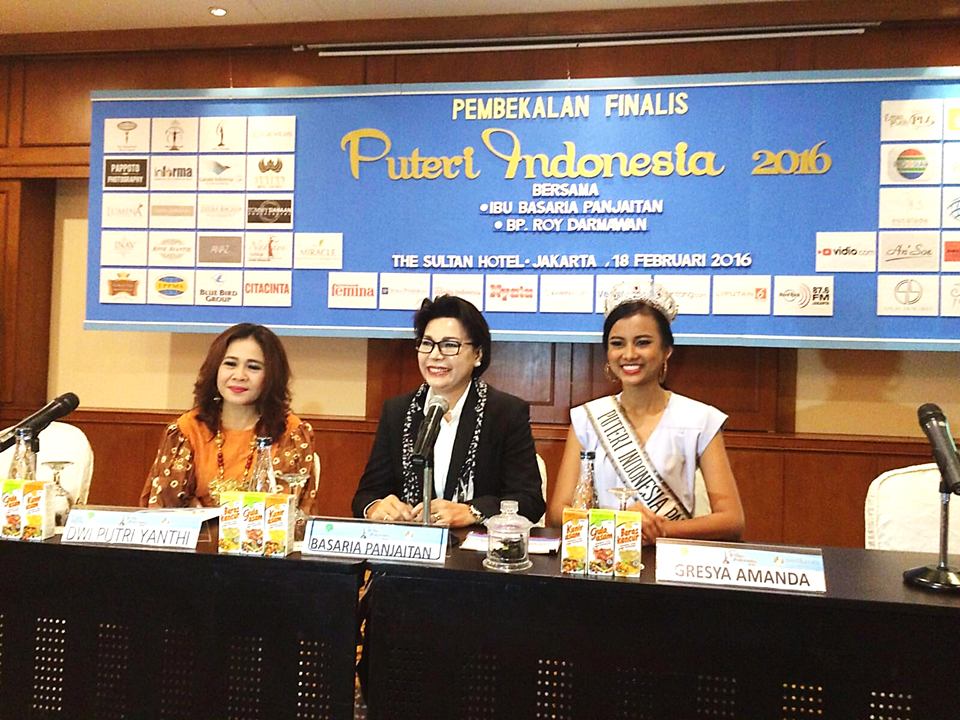
Gresya (right) at the Corruption Eradication Commission conference on 12 February 2016.

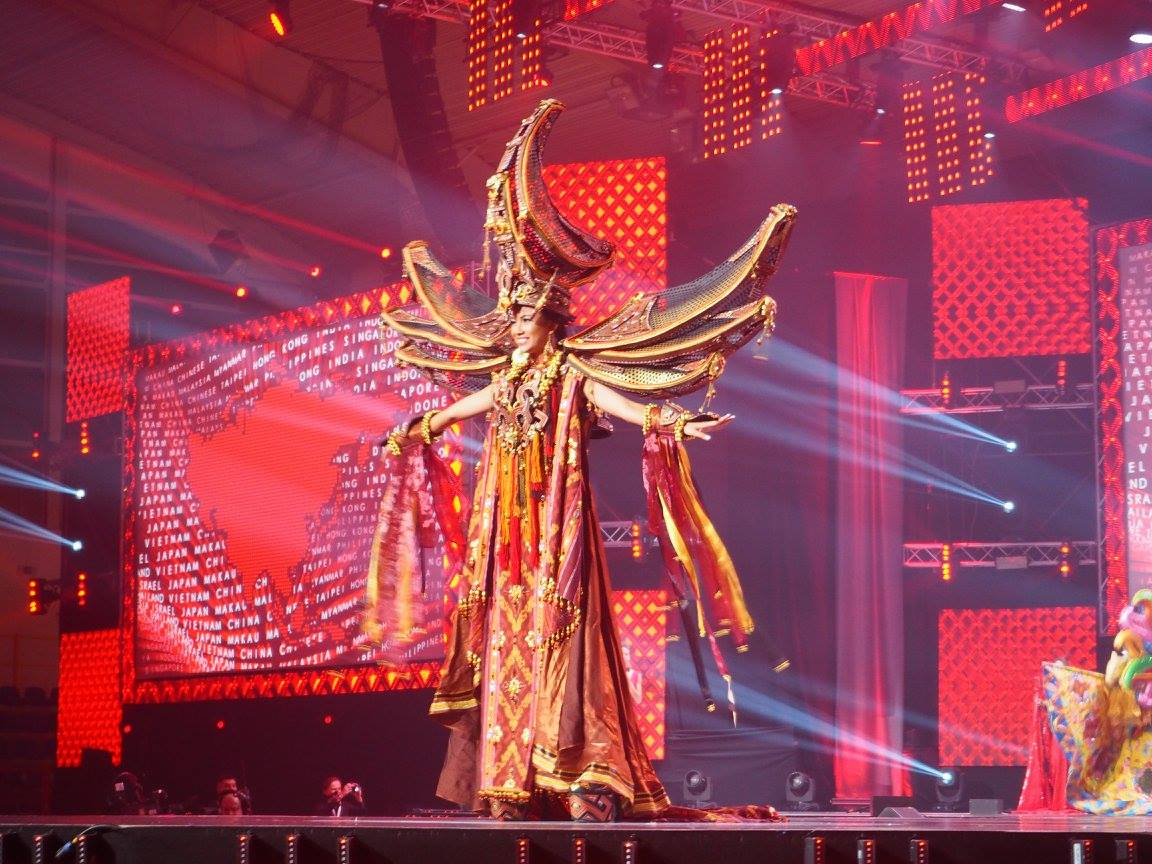
Gresya won "Best National Costume" award, designed by Jember Fashion Carnaval at the Miss Supranational 2015 on 5 December 2015.

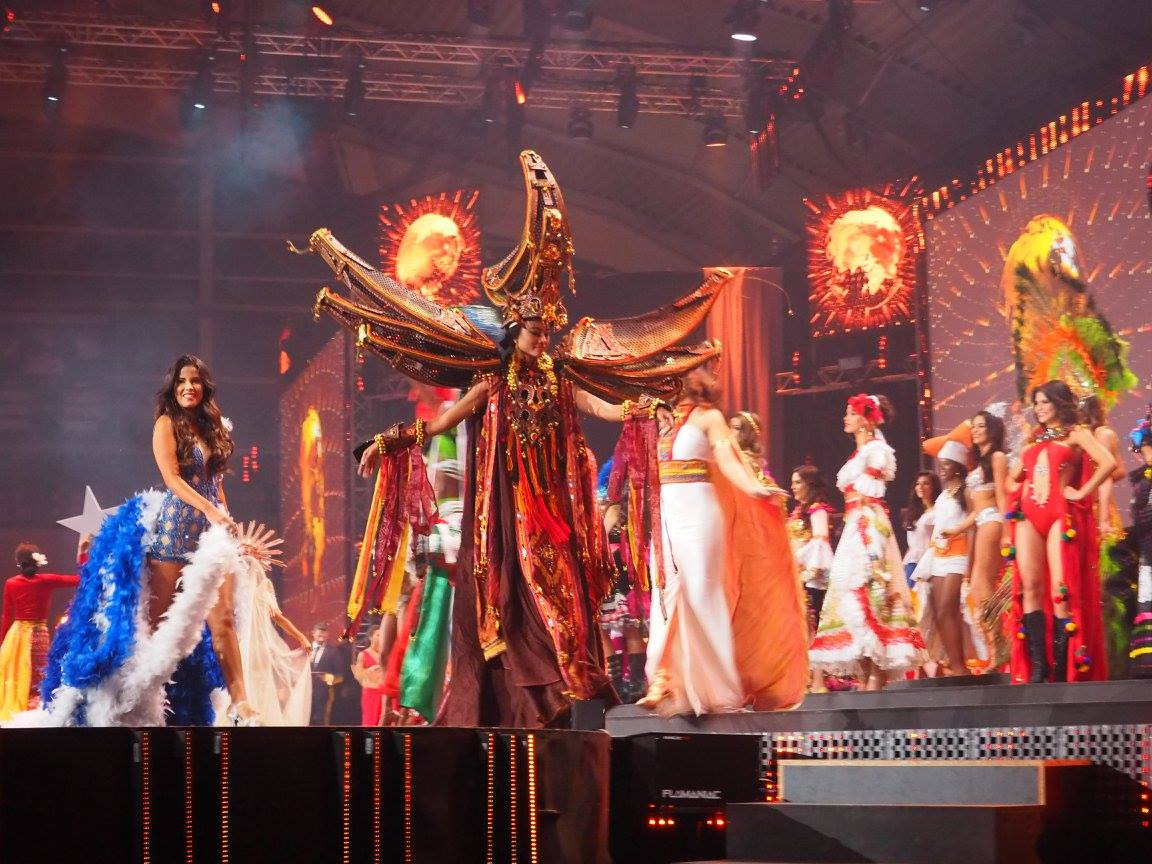
Gresya on the Miss Supranational 2015 stage on 5 December 2015.

=== Puteri Indonesia 2015 ===
Gresya stepping her foray into the field of pageantry by took part in Puteri Indonesia beauty pageant, representing North Sulawesi on Puteri Indonesia 2015, where she was crowned as Puteri Indonesia Pariwisata 2015 (Miss Supranational Indonesia 2015), at the grand finale held in Jakarta Convention Center, Jakarta, Indonesia on 20 February 2015, by the outgoing titleholder of Puteri Indonesia Pariwisata 2014, Lily Estelita Liana of Special Region of Yogyakarta. At the pageant she also gained a special award as "Puteri Indonesia of Sulawesi Islands".

Gresya crowned together with Puteri Indonesia; Anindya Kusuma Putri of Central Java, Puteri Indonesia Lingkungan; Chintya Fabyola of West Kalimantan, and Puteri Indonesia Perdamaian; Syarifah Olvah Bwefar Alhamid of West Papua.

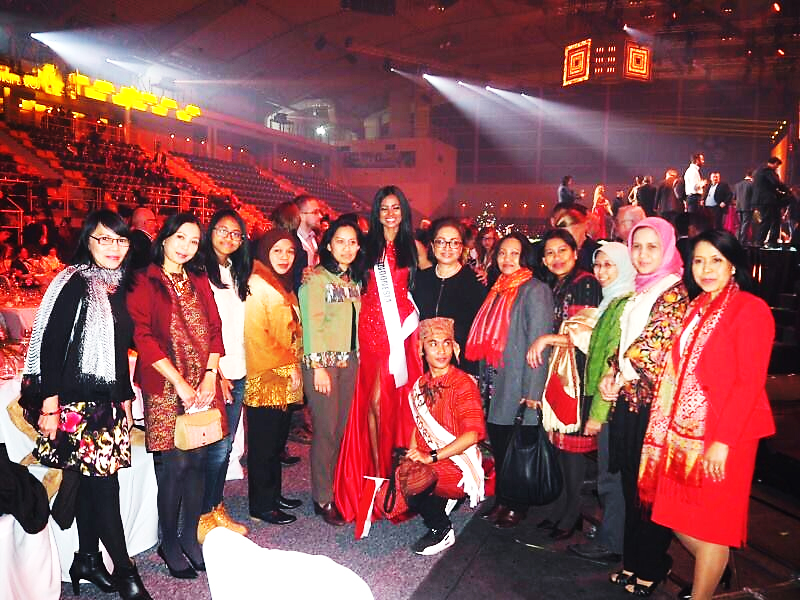
Gresya together with her supporters in Miss Supranational 2015.

=== Miss Supranational 2015 ===
As Puteri Indonesia Pariwisata 2015, Gresya represented Indonesia at the 7th edition of the Miss Supranational pageant, held in MOSIR (Hall of Sports), Krynica-Zdrój, Poland on 5 December 2015. She ended up placed in the Top 24 and won Best National Costume Awards at the pageant.

Gresya brought a national costume with the Torajan Tongkonan-inspired ensemble, Tongkonan is the traditional ancestral house, or Rumah adat of the Torajan people, in South Sulawesi, Indonesia. Tongkonan have a distinguishing boat-shaped and oversized saddleback roof. The costume named "Mystical Toraja" designed by Jember Fashion Carnival. Asha Bhat of India crowned Stephania Stegman of Paraguay as the new titleholder at the end of the event.

== Filmography ==
Gresya has appeared on several movies. She has acted in a television film and cinema box-office film. She is also taking part as the presenter for musical show in Indosiar called Indonesian Dangdut Awards since 2017.

=== Movies ===
Year	Title	Genre	Role	Film Production	Ref.
2017	I Was Born To Win	romance film-drama	as herself	Rapi Films	

=== TV shows ===
Year	Title	Genre	Role	TV Network	Ref.
2017–present	Indonesian Dangdut Awards	Musical Show	as Herself	Indosiar	

== See also ==
- Puteri Indonesia 2015
- Miss Supranational 2015
- Anindya Kusuma Putri
- Chintya Fabyola
- Syarifah Olvah Bwefar Alhamid

Awards and achievements
Preceded by Maria Rizky Chrisliany	Puteri North Sulawesi; 2015	Succeeded by Kezia Warouw
Preceded by Lily Estelita Liana (SR Yogyakarta)	Puteri Indonesia Pariwisata; 2015	Succeeded by Intan Aletrinö (West Sumatra)
