= Lily Estelita Liana =

Doctor, Puteri Indonesia Pariwisata 2014 and Miss Supranational Indonesia 2014

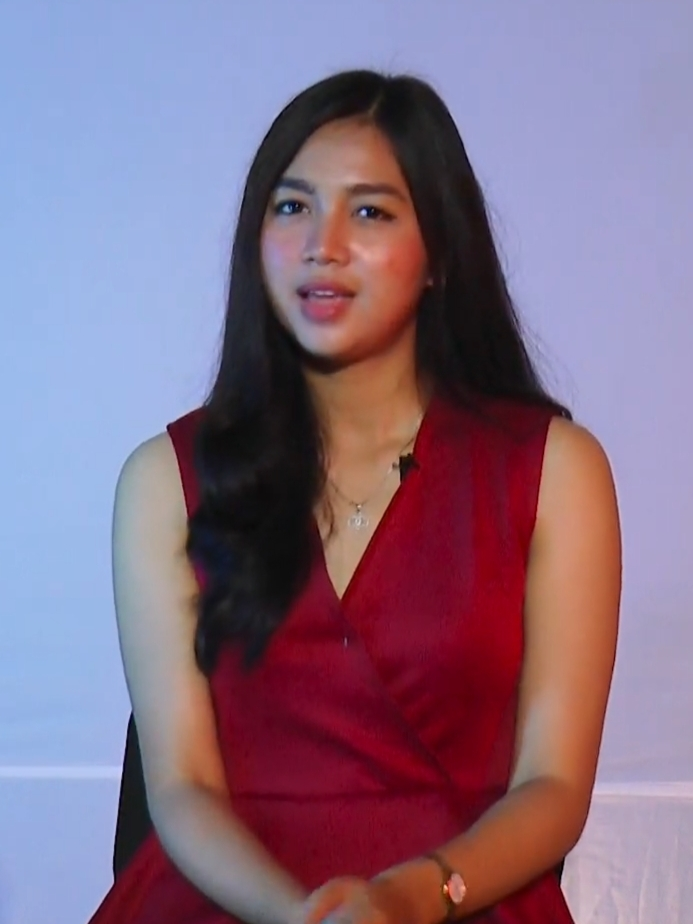
- Liana on her YouTube
- Born: 22 July 1993 (age 33); Sleman, Special Region of Yogyakarta, Indonesia
- Education: Gadjah Mada University
- Occupations: National Narcotics Board of the Republic of Indonesia Ambassador; Doctor; Fashion Model; Beauty pageant titleholders
- Height: 172 cm (5 ft 8 in)
- Beauty pageant titleholder
- Title: Puteri Indonesia Pariwisata 2014; Miss Supranational Indonesia 2014
- Hair color: Brown
- Eye color: Brown
- Major competitions: Puteri Indonesia 2014; (2nd Runner-up – Puteri Indonesia Pariwisata); Miss Supranational Indonesia 2014; (Unplaced)

Lily Estelita Liana (born 22 July 1993), popularly known as Estelita Liana, is an Indonesian National Narcotics Board of the Republic of Indonesia Ambassador, doctor, fashion model and a beauty pageant titleholder who won the title of Puteri Indonesia Pariwisata 2014. She represented Indonesia at the Miss Supranational 2014 pageant in Krynica-Zdrój, Poland, where she won Best National Costume Awards, designed by Jember Fashion Carnaval.

== Early life and education ==
Lily was born in Sleman, Special Region of Yogyakarta, Indonesia to traditional Javanese parents. On 2014, she was part of the Puteri Indonesia Queens, batch 2014, since she was 15 Gresya work as a beauty influencer. She holds a magister degree in Doctor of Medicine from Faculty of Medicine of Gadjah Mada University, Sleman – Special Region of Yogyakarta.

== Pageantry ==
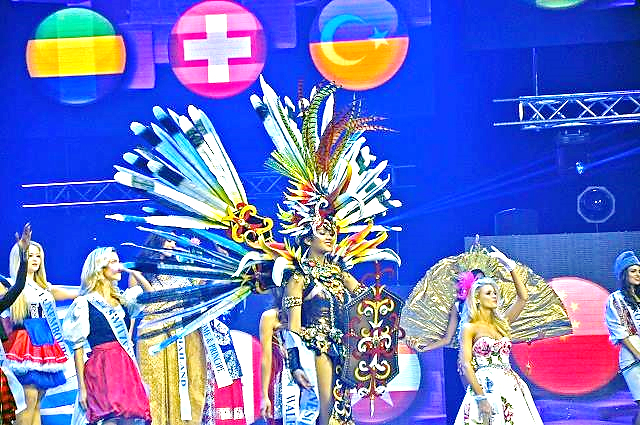
Lily (center) during the Miss Supranational 2014 Finale National Costume Competition, where she ended up won "Best National Costume" award on 5 December 2014.

=== Puteri Indonesia 2014 ===
Lily representing Special Region of Yogyakarta on Puteri Indonesia 2014, at the grand finale held in Jakarta Convention Center, Jakarta, Indonesia on 19 February 2014. She was crowned as Puteri Indonesia Pariwisata 2014 by the outgoing titleholder of Puteri Indonesia Pariwisata 2013, Cok Istri Krisnanda Widani of Bali.

Lily crowned together with Puteri Indonesia; Elvira Devinamira Wirayanti of East Java and Puteri Indonesia Lingkungan; Elfin Pertiwi Rappa of South Sumatra.

=== Miss Supranational 2014 ===
As Puteri Indonesia Pariwisata 2014, Lily represented Indonesia at the 6th edition of Miss Supranational 2014 pageant, held in MOSIR (Hall of Sports), Krynica-Zdrój, Poland on 5 December 2014.

Lily brought a national costume with the "Dayak Warrior Princess of Borneo"-inspired ensemble, designed by Jember Fashion Carnaval as her national costume. Dayak or Dyak or Dayuh are one of the native groups of Borneo. She ended up won "Best National Costume Awards" at the pageant. This is the first time for Indonesia to won "Best National Costume" award since joining Miss Supranational at 2013. Mutya Johanna Datul of the Philippines crowned Asha Bhat of India as the new titleholder at the end of the event.

== See also ==
- Puteri Indonesia 2014
- Elvira Devinamira Wirayanti
- Elfin Pertiwi Rappa

Awards and achievements
| Preceded by Florentia Anindita Apsari Isthika | Puteri Yogyakarta; 2014 | Succeeded by Annisa Yunas Hermanto |
| Preceded by Cok Istri Krisnanda Widani (Bali) | Puteri Indonesia Pariwisata; 2014 | Succeeded by Gresya Maaliwuga (North Sulawesi) |
