= Whulandary Herman =

Indonesian beauty pageant winner (born 1987)

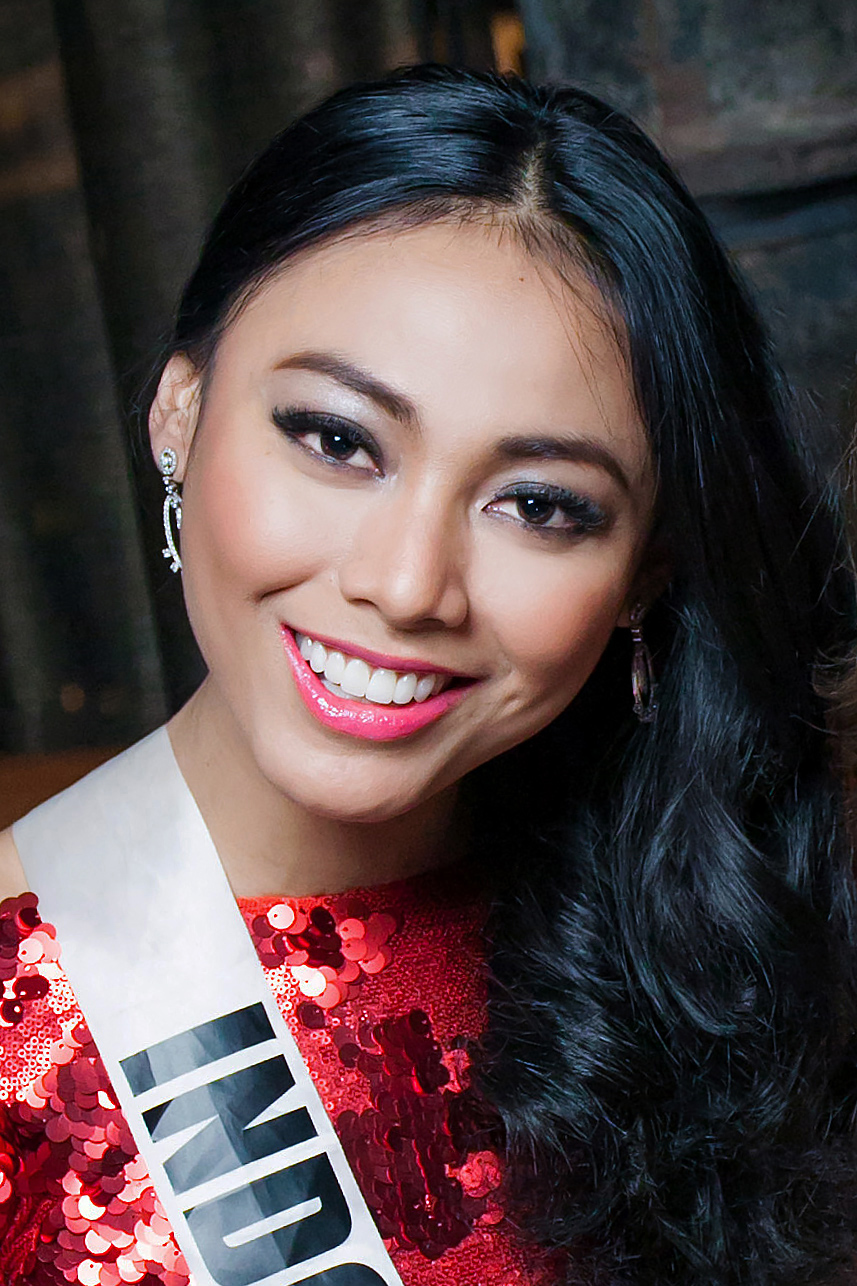
- Herman in 2013
- Born: Whulandary Herman; 26 June 1987 (age 39); Pariaman, West Sumatra, Indonesia
- Education: Paramadina University (BA) in Communication studies; IBLAM Higher School Of Law (LL.B.)
- Height: 1.77 m (5 ft 10 in)
- Spouse: Nik Ibrahim Nik Mohamed Din (m. 2018)
- Children: 2
- Beauty pageant titleholder
- Title: Puteri Indonesia 2013; Miss Universe Indonesia 2013
- Major competitions: Puteri Indonesia 2013; (Winner); Miss Universe 2013; (Top 16)

Whulandary Herman (born 26 June 1987) is an Indonesian actress, television personality, model and beauty pageant titleholder. She was crowned Puteri Indonesia 2013 and represented her country at the Miss Universe 2013 pageant, where she reached the top 16, ranked on eleventh spot. She is the second Indonesian and Sumatran Miss Universe finalist after Artika Sari Devi at Miss Universe 2005.

== Early life ==
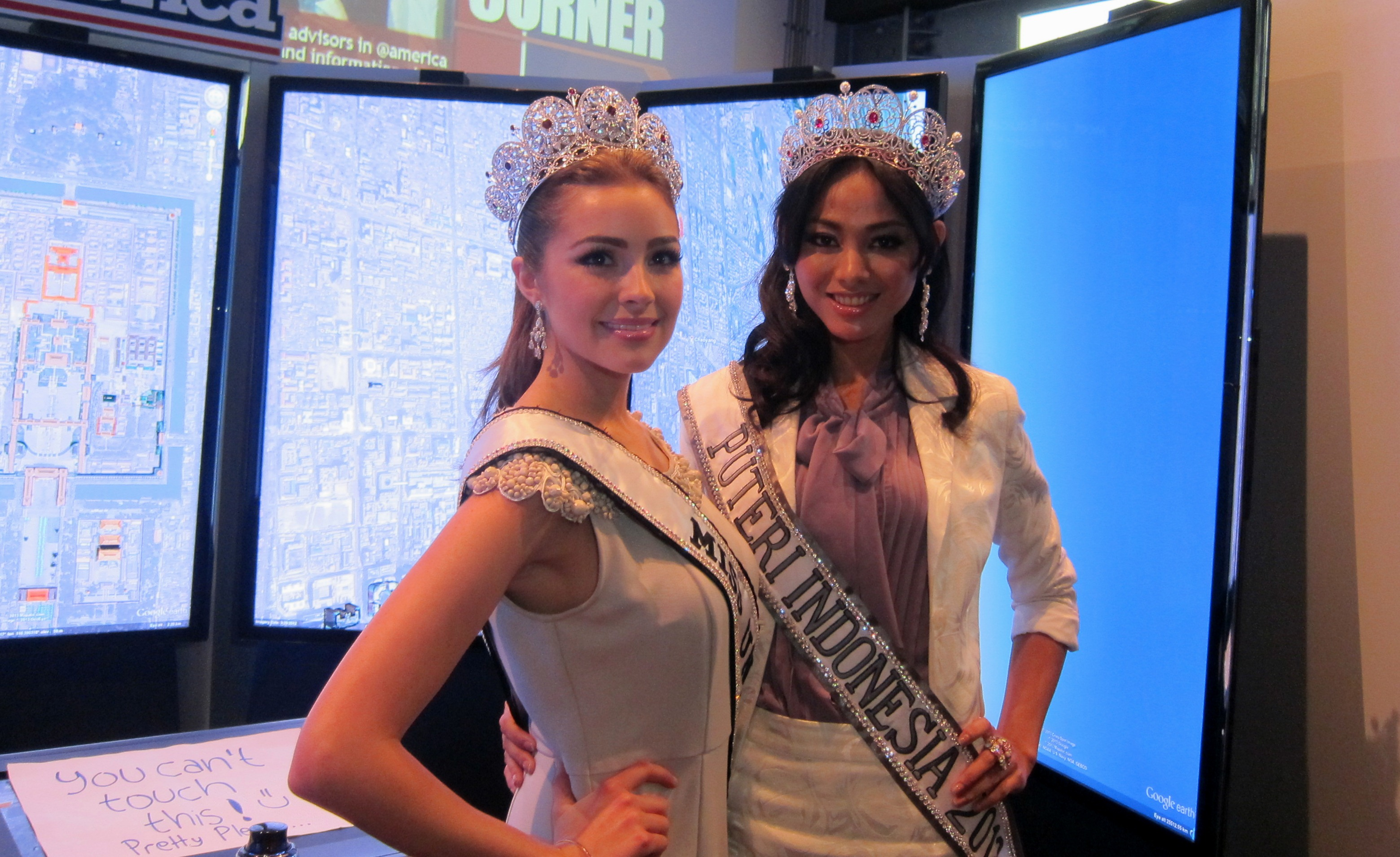
Herman with Miss Universe 2012, Olivia Culpo in 2013

Herman was born on 26 June 1987 in Pariaman, West Sumatra to a single mother Yetti Marsanti, her father Rahmat Saleh Herman died when she was 1 year old. Herman was raised in Minangkabaunese heritage, she also attended high school in Padang. In 2007 she moved to Jakarta and started a career in modeling, and also continued her education. Herman completed her double degree program, Bachelor of Arts (BA) in Communication studies from Paramadina University and Bachelor of Law (LL.B.) from IBLAM Higher School of Law in Jakarta - Indonesia.

On 9 February 2018, Herman married Malaysian businessman Nik Ibrahim Nik Mohamed Din in Borobudur Temple, Magelang, Central Java - Indonesia, and they have two children together. Herman continues to maintain her Indonesian citizenship.

== Career ==
=== Modelling and beauty camp ===
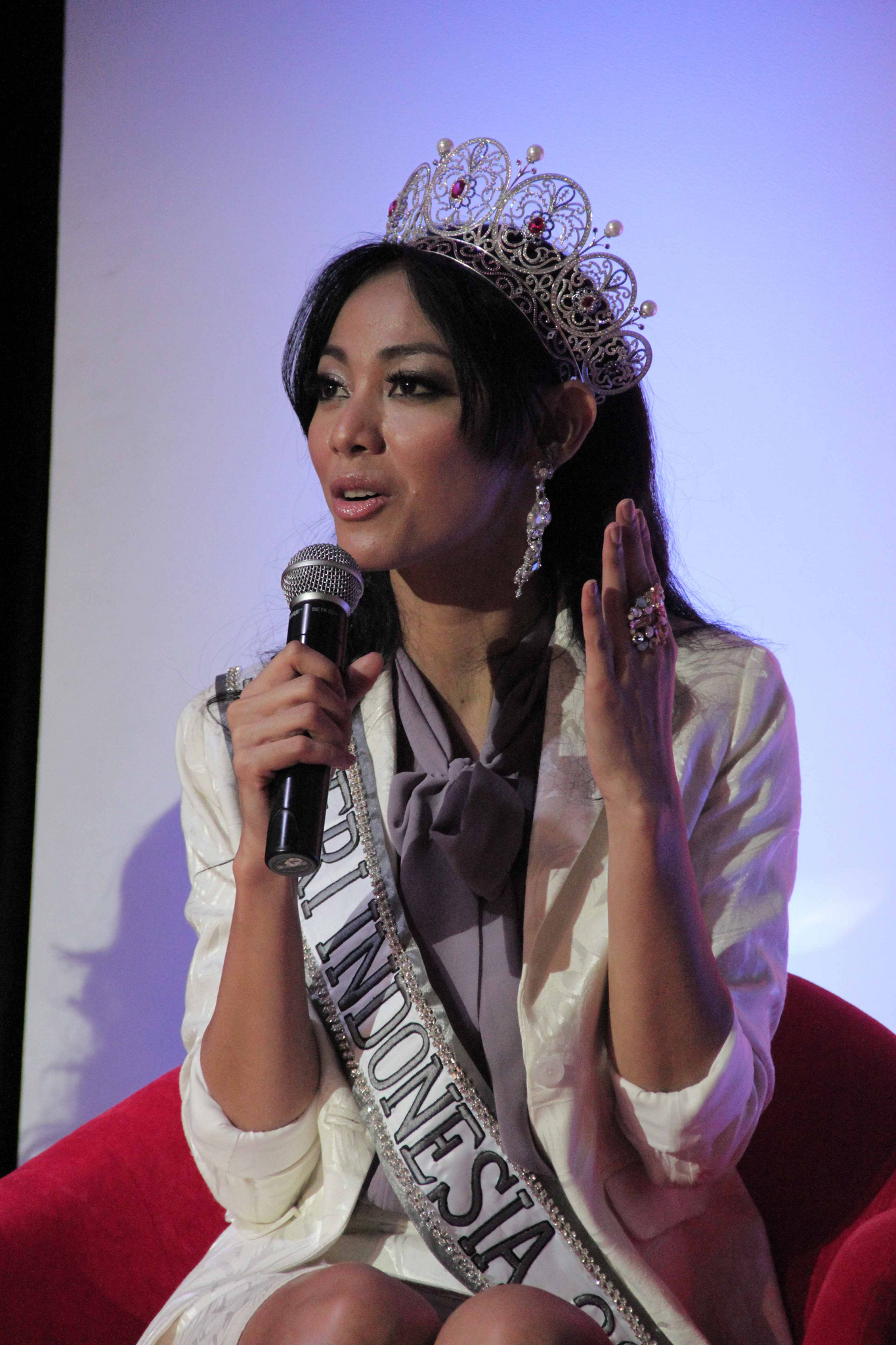
Herman speaking at the Embassy of the United States, Jakarta

Herman began representing Indonesia at International modelling contests, then competed in Wajah Femina 2008 held by Femina Indonesia Magazine, finishing as the first runner-up. She is also the winner of the 2010 Asian Top Model of The Year, defeated three other nominees from Vietnam, China, and Mongolia held in Seoul - South Korea. A year earlier, Herman won the 3rd Runner Up and The Best Catwalk at the 2008-2009 International Top Model of the World in Berlin - Germany.

In 2013, Herman appeared at Mercedes-Benz Fashion Week held in Red Square and the Bolshoi Theatre, Moscow - Russia featured Tony Ward Couture collection. In 2013–2016, Herman walked in New York Fashion Week as she was chosen as TRESemmé Indonesia brand ambassador, Herman also showcased moslem fashion designer Anniesa Hasibuan and Michael Kors at the same event. Herman also annually graced in Jakarta Fashion Week and Kuala Lumpur Fashion Week.

In 2016, Herman together with Miss Universe 2005 top 15 finalist Artika Sari Devi Kusmayadi opened the "ArtikaWhulandary Beauty Camp", to sharpen the skills of Indonesian women who are interested in joining local or international beauty pageants, the beauty camp idea is first initiated in 2013.

=== Causes and philanthropy ===
Herman has been an advocate for HIV AIDS awareness, Breast Cancer and childhood cancer, since she was crowned Miss Universe Indonesia through her platform Yayasan Sentuhan Kasih Anak Indonesia, or in English a Touch of Love for Indonesian Children Foundation. This Indonesian based NGO is focusing on children with pediatric cancer and women or mother with Breast Cancer, Herman is working in partnership with team of doctors from a number of hospitals across Indonesia to supply the families of childhood cancer suffers by improving access to intervention facilities, therapies, mental health information, cancer consultation, daily nutrition and necessary treatments. In 2016 together with Estée Lauder Companies, Herman created a campaign for the Breast Cancer Awareness month in Indonesia with a tagline "Take Action Together to Defeat Breast Cancer", the annual global campaign program that supports cancer survivor with education and fundraising; the campaign received huge amount of support from the President of Yayasan Kanker Indonesia (YKI).

On 18 July 2018, President of Indonesia - Joko Widodo, appointed Herman to be a Piring dancer, wearing traditional Minangkabau dress, for the opening ceremony of 2018 Asian Games torch relay in Grobogan Regency, Central Java - Indonesia.

== Pageantry ==
=== Puteri Indonesia 2012–2013 ===
Herman, who stands 1.77 meters tall, competed as the representative of West Sumatera province, against 37 other contestants from 33 provinces. At the end of the coronation night, Suardana successfully defeated other 37 delegates from across Indonesia, being the second Minangkabaunese to win Puteri Indonesia, the first one was in 2002 with Melanie Putria won the title, both represents West Sumatra. Herman was crowned as Puteri Indonesia 2013 by the outgoing titleholder, Maria Selena Nurcahya of Central Java, Herman was crowned along with her fellow Puteri Indonesia queens, Marisa Sartika Maladewi, Cok Istri Krisnanda Widani and Novia Indriani Mamuaja.

=== Miss Universe 2013 ===
As the winner of Miss Universe Indonesia 2013, Herman represented Indonesia at Miss Universe 2013 where she became the second Indonesian woman to place in the semifinals after Artika Sari Devi in 2005, eventually finishing in the top 16, ranked on eleventh spot overall. During the final swimsuit competition, she was one of only two semifinalists (alongside Dominique Rinderknecht of Switzerland) to wear a maillot one-piece rather than the usual two-piece. However, she did wear a two-piece for photo shoots throughout the pageant and also for Miss Universe 2013 official portrait shot by Fadil Berisha. She was also named 3rd runner-up in Best National Costume.

== Filmography ==
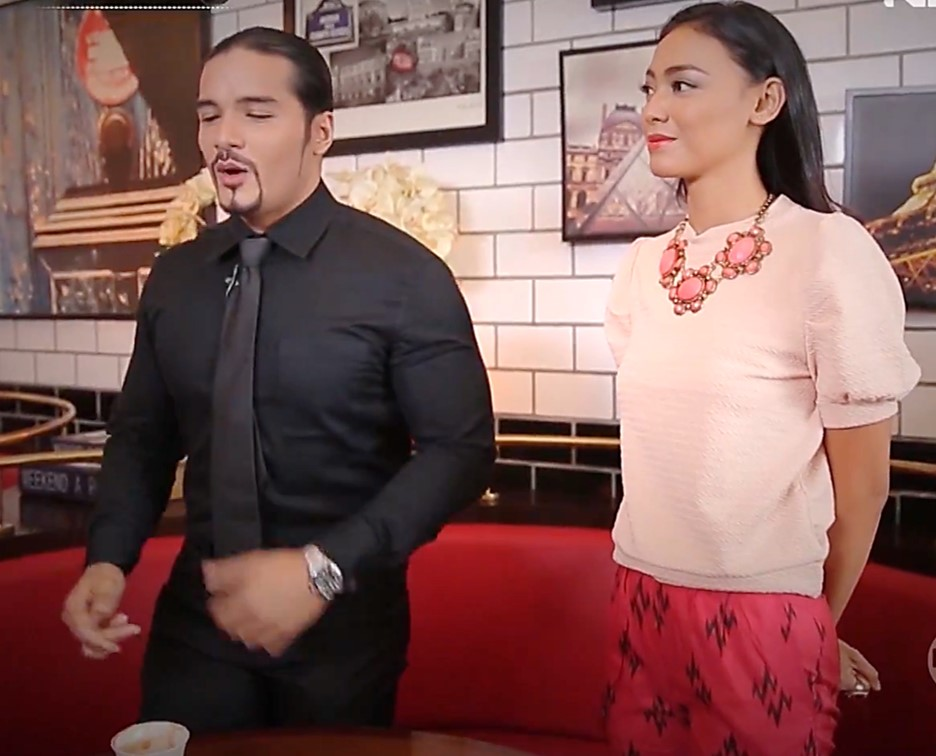
Herman (right) in Lintas Imaji NET (Indonesian TV network) on 6 December 2015.

Herman began acting in an Indonesian drama film, Bidadari Terakhir, directed by Awi Suryadi, which was nominated for Tuti Indra Malaon Awards for Best New Actress in 2015 Maya Awards, where she ended up won the award.

=== Movies ===
Year	Title	Genre	Role	Film Production	Ref.
2015	Bidadari Terakhir	drama	as Eva	Awi Suryadi	
2015	Hantu Kuburan Tua	horror	as Laura	Mitra Pictures	
2016	Will You Marry Me (film 2016)	drama	as Stefani	Mercusuar Films	

=== Television ===
Year	Title	Role	TV Network	Ref.
2020	The Bridge (Season 2)	as Indah Pangestu	Viu/HBO Asia	
2022	Indonesia's Next Top Model (season 3)	as Judge	NET (Indonesian TV network)	

== Awards and nomination ==
Year	Awards	Category	Nominated work	Result	Ref.
2015	2015 Maya Awards	Tuti Indra Malaon Awards for Best New Actress	Bidadari Terakhir	Won	

== Gallery ==
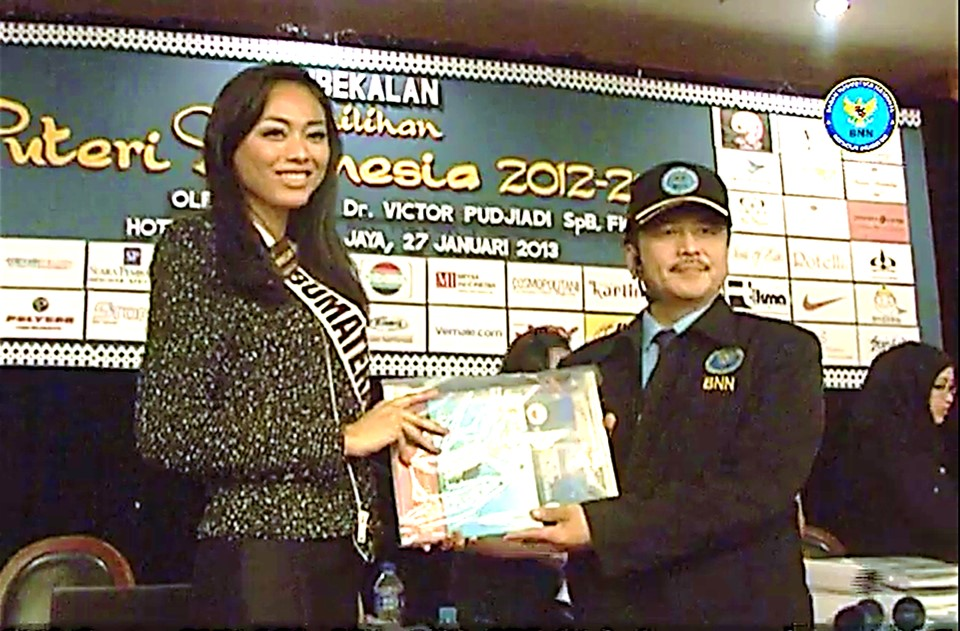
Herman as a guest speaker of The National Narcotics Board of The Republic of Indonesia event - "Beautiful Without Drugs" on 29 January 2013.

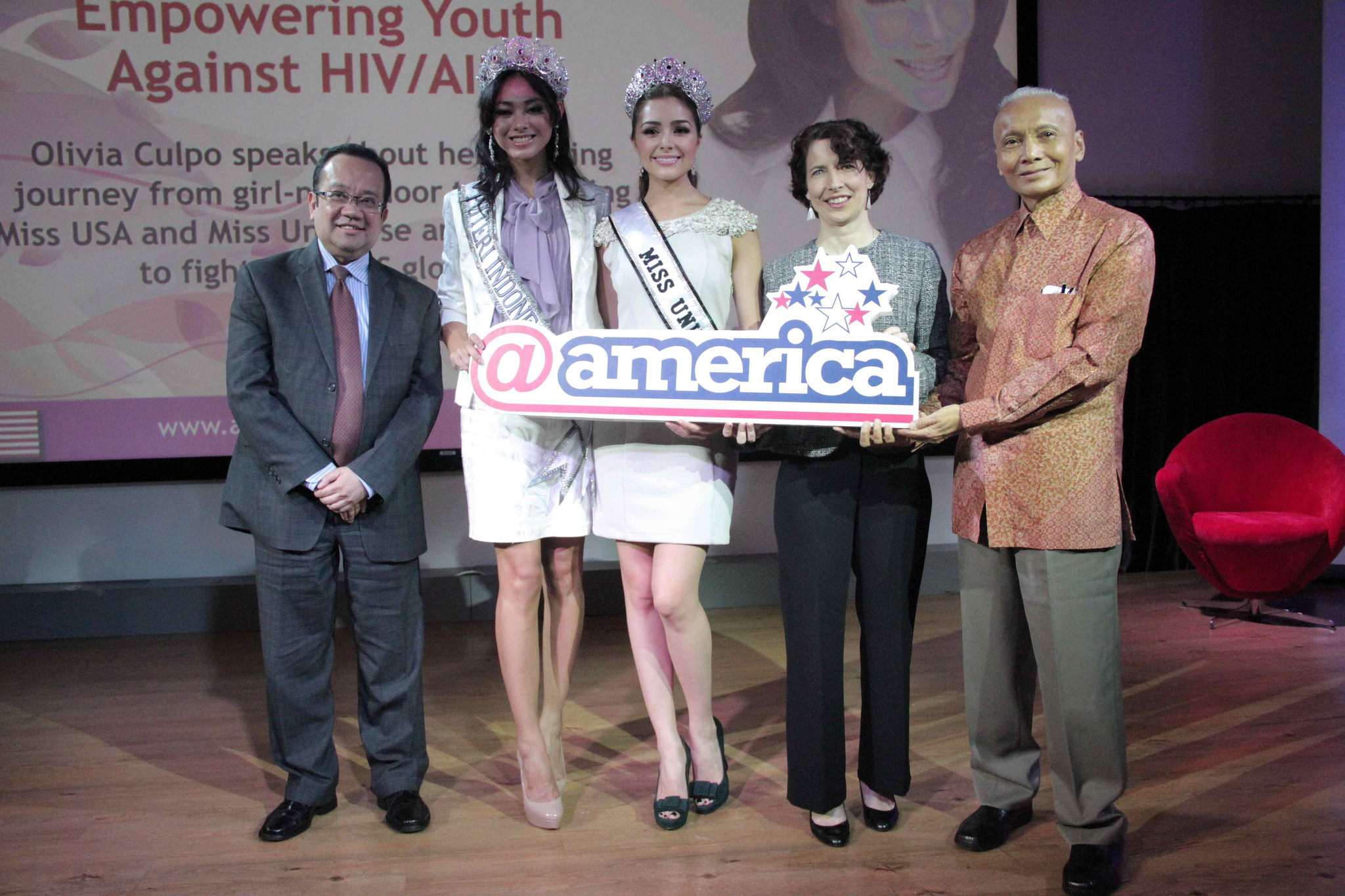
Herman (two from the left) with Miss Universe 2012, Olivia Culpo promoting HIV AIDS awareness in Embassy of the United States, Jakarta on 5 February 2013.

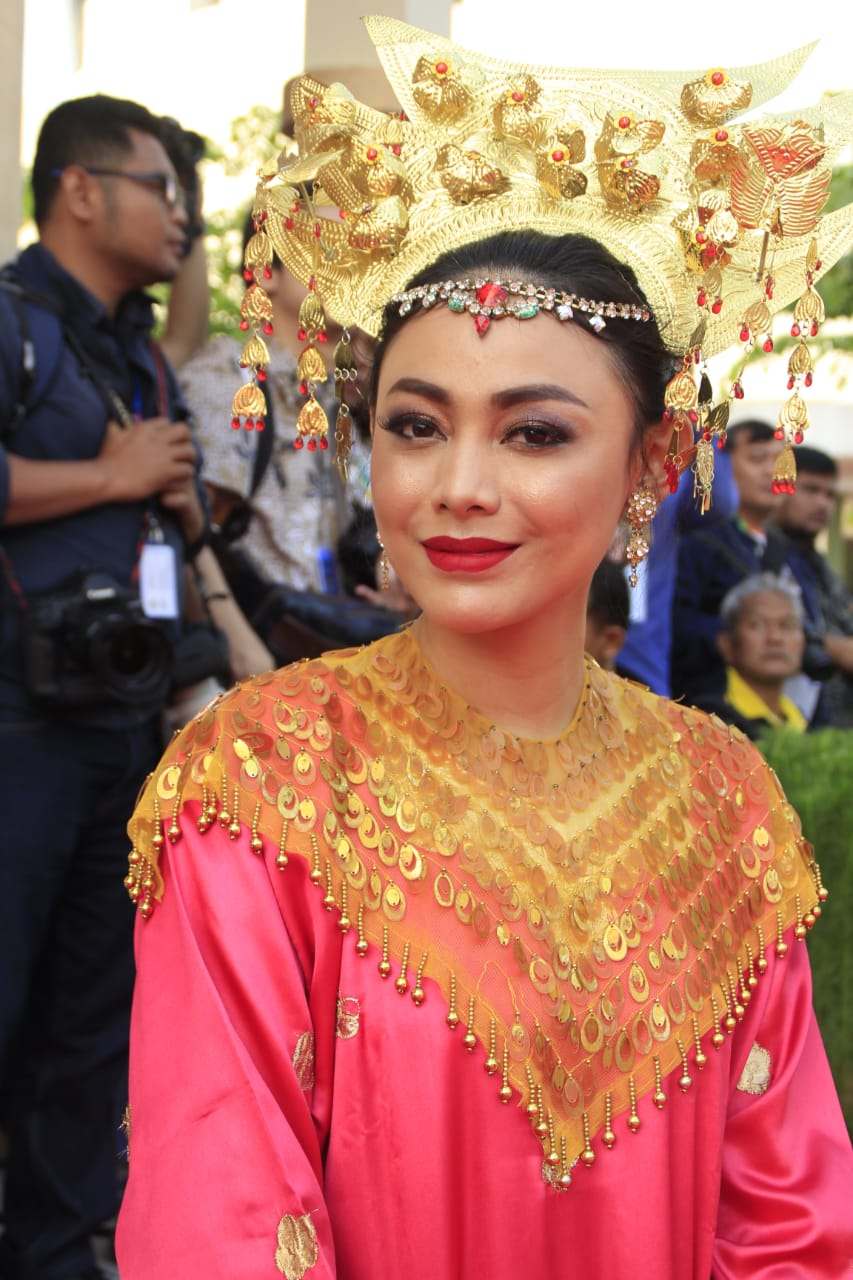
Herman wearing traditional Minangkabau dress, during 2018 Asian Games torch relay on 18 July 2018.

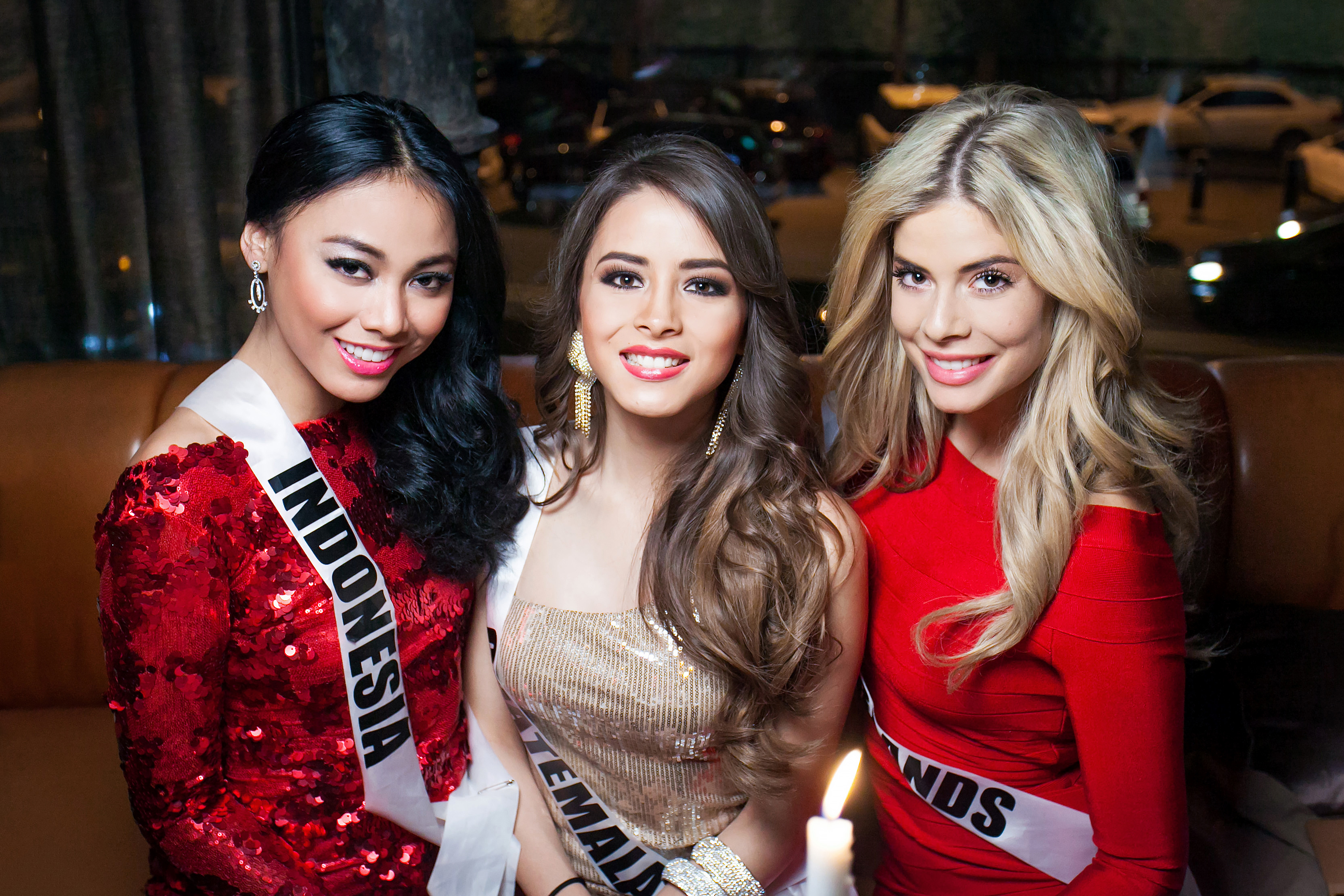
Herman with Miss Guatemala Paulette Samayoa and Miss Netherlands Stephanie Tency, during Miss Universe 2013 pageant quarantine in Crocus City Hall, Krasnogorsk Moscow - Russia.

Awards and achievements
Preceded by Annisa Ananda Nusyirwan	Puteri West Sumatra; 2012-2013	Succeeded by Raisa Adila Andomi
Preceded by Maria Selena Nurcahya, Central Java	Puteri Indonesia; 2012-2013	Succeeded by Elvira Devinamira, East Java
