= Elfin Pertiwi Rappa =

Indonesian model, Puteri Indonesia Lingkungan 2014 and Miss International Indonesia 2014

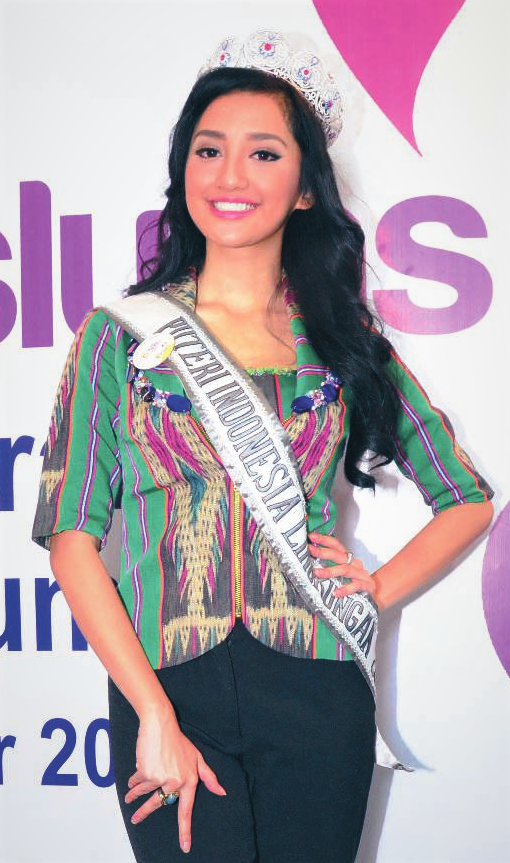
- Rappa in KIPRAH PU magazine in 2014
- Born: Elfin Pertiwi Rappa; 23 September 1995 (age 31); Palembang, South Sumatera, Indonesia
- Education: Sriwijaya University, Palembang, South Sumatera, Indonesia
- Height: 1.70 m (5 ft 7 in)
- Spouse: Putra Ryan (m. 2017)
- Children: 1
- Beauty pageant titleholder
- Title: Puteri Indonesia Sumatera Selatan 2014; Puteri Indonesia Lingkungan 2014; Miss International Indonesia 2014
- Hair color: Black
- Eye color: Black
- Major competitions: Puteri Indonesia Sumatera Selatan 2014; (Winner); Puteri Indonesia 2014; (1st Runner-up – Puteri Indonesia Lingkungan); Miss International 2014; (Top 10)

Elfin Pertiwi Rappa (born 23 September 1995 in Palembang, South Sumatera) is an Indonesian model and beauty pageant titleholder who was crowned Puteri Indonesia Lingkungan 2014, and represented Indonesia at the Miss International 2014 pageant and achieved a Top 10 position and won Best National Costume.

== Early life ==
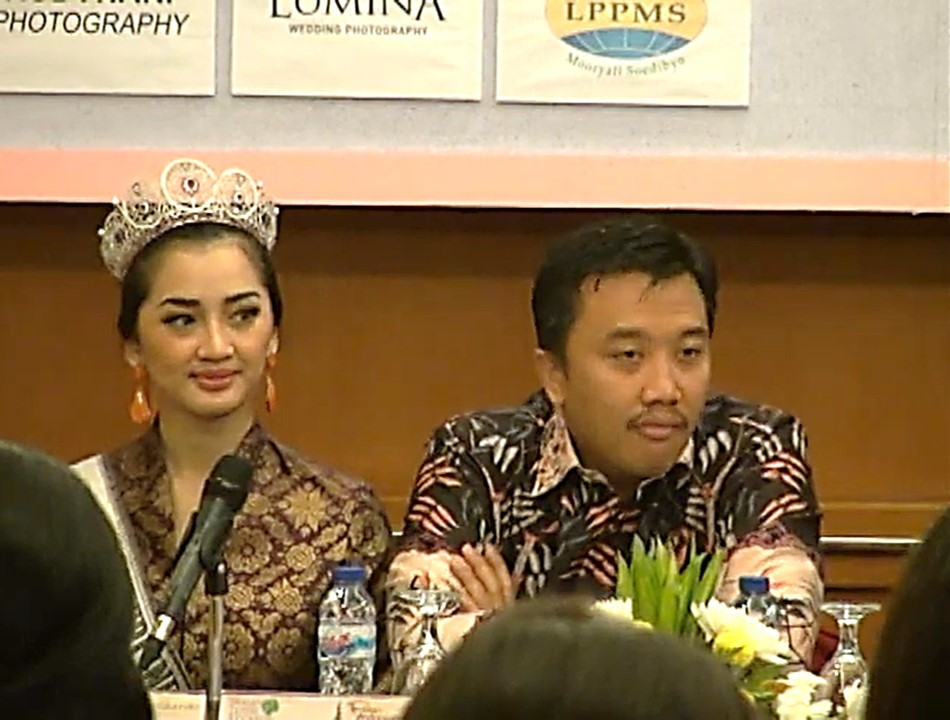
Rappa (left) as a guest speaker in Ministry of Youth and Sports of The Republic of Indonesia in 2015.

Elfin was born in Palembang, South Sumatera, Indonesia, to an Indo father and Indonesian mother. She is of Portuguese descent. She holds a bachelor degree in Business Management from Sriwijaya University. Working as well as a model, she reached number of achievements in that field. Elfin was the winner of Cover Guest Aneka Yess Magazine 2009, was the Brand Ambassador at Cardinal Awards 2010, was placed in Top 3 of Star Teen High End Teen Magazine 2011, was placed in Top 3 of Model of Indonesia 2012, the winner of Gadis Palembang 2012 or Miss Teen Palembang 2012 and Gadis South Sumatera 2013.

== Pageantry ==
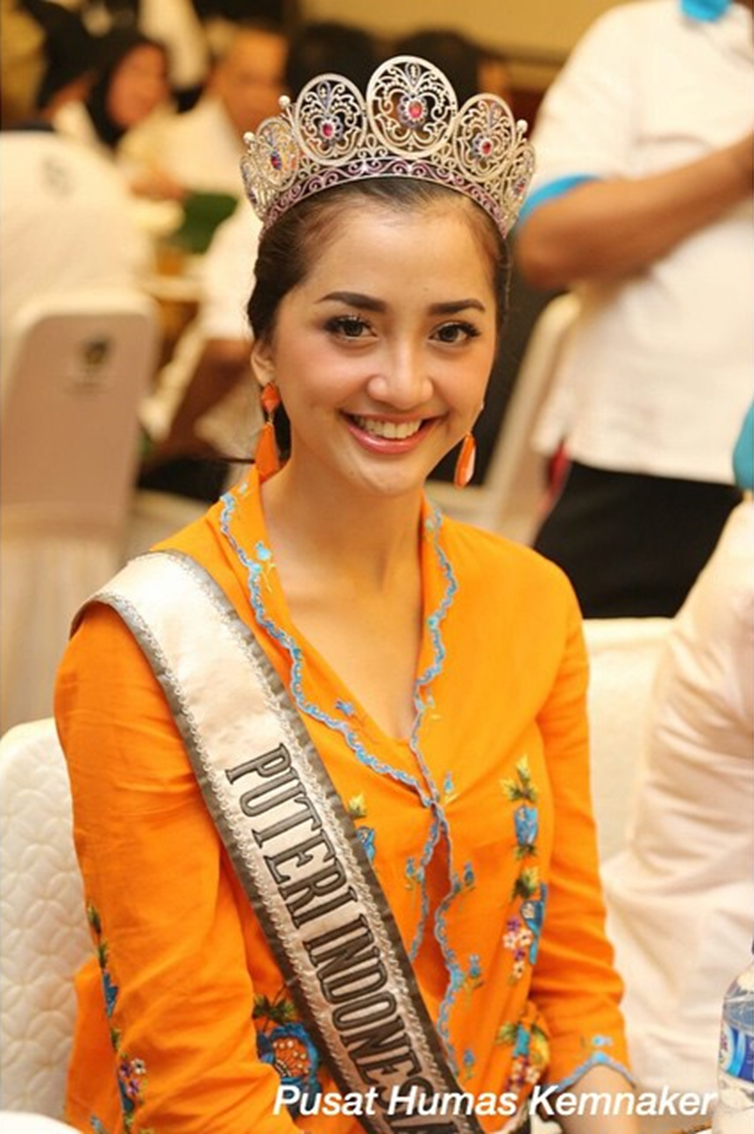
Rappa attending Ministry of Manpower of the Republic of Indonesia Event in 2015.

=== Puteri Sumatera Selatan 2013 ===
Before stepping into the field of pageantry, Elfin took part in the provincial level of the Puteri Indonesia South Sumatra 2014, at the end of the event, Elfin was crowned Puteri Sumatera Selatan 2013 and would represent Sumatera Selatan at Puteri Indonesia 2014.

=== Puteri Indonesia 2014 ===
Elfin represented Sumatera Selatan and eventually finished as first runner-up to Elvira Devinamira and crowned as Puteri Indonesia Lingkungan 2014. She then represented Indonesia at the Miss International 2014.

Elfin was crowned by her successor Puteri Indonesia Lingkungan 2013, Marisa Sartika Maladewi of South Sumatra. Elvira was crowned together with Elvira Devinamira Wirayanti as Puteri Indonesia 2014 (Miss Universe Indonesia 2014) and Lily Estelita Liana as Puteri Indonesia Pariwisata 2014 (Miss Supranational Indonesia 2014). The final coronation night was graced by the reigning Miss Universe 2013, Gabriela Isler of Venezuela as the selection committee.

=== Miss International 2014 ===
As Puteri Indonesia Lingkungan 2014, Elfin represented Indonesia at the 54th edition of Miss International 2014 in Tokyo, Japan where she placed in the Top 10 in addition to winning a special award of Best National Costume, Elfin's national costume used "Sigar Lampung" from Lampung and Batik as a theme and the main component.

== See also ==
- Puteri Indonesia 2014
- Miss International 2014
- Elvira Devinamira Wirayanti
- Lily Estelita Liana

Awards and achievements
Preceded by Marisa Sartika Maladewi	Puteri South Sumatra; 2014	Succeeded by Desti Indah Rizky
Preceded by South Sumatra; Marisa Sartika Maladewi	Puteri Indonesia Lingkungan; 2014	Succeeded by West Kalimantan; Chintya Fabyola
