= Chintya Fabyola =

Indonesian beauty pageant titleholder

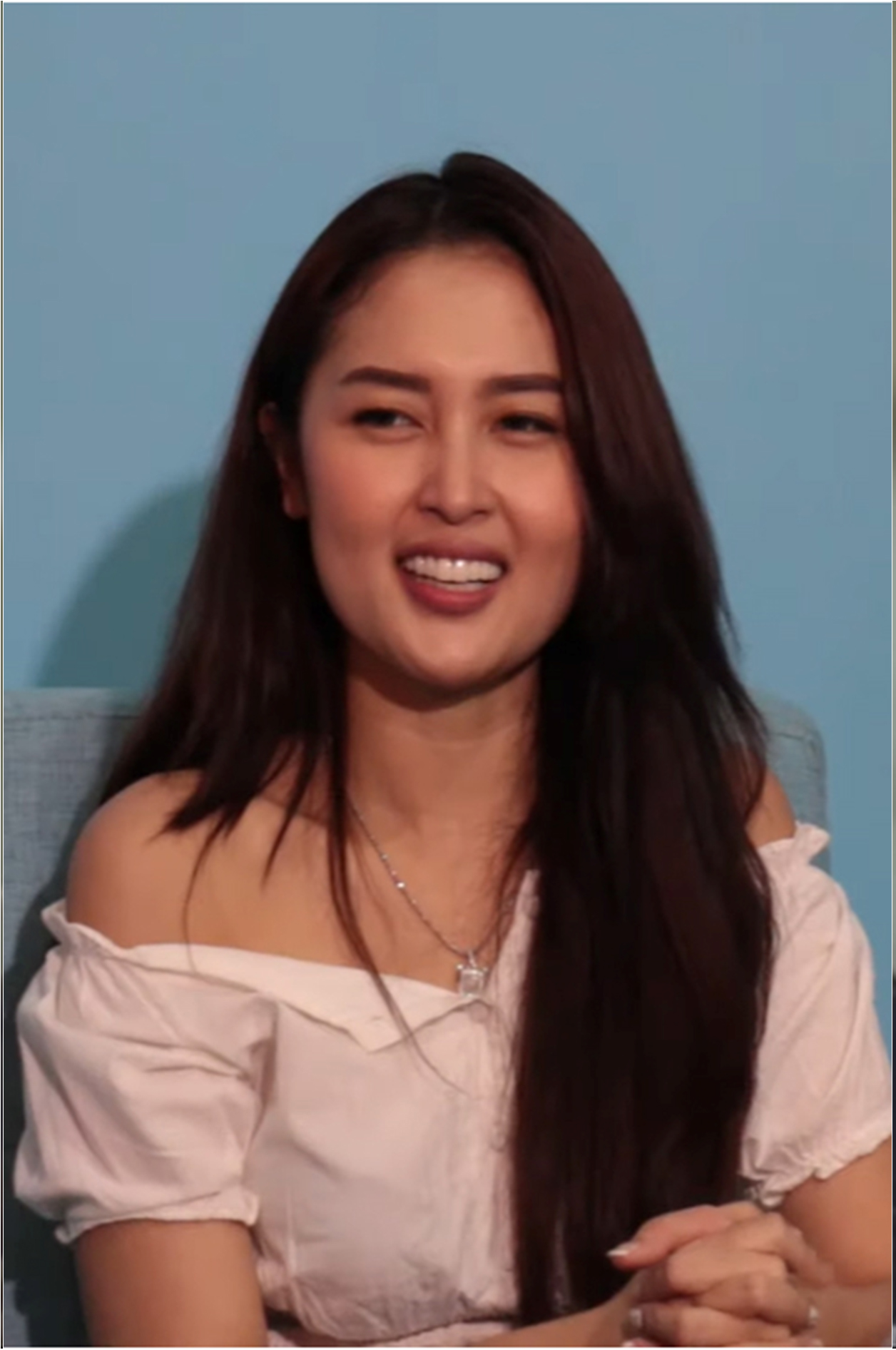
- Chintya Fabyola in 2020
- Born: Chintya Fabyola; 10 February 1995 (age 31); Pontianak, West Kalimantan
- Height: 1.70 m (5 ft 7 in)
- Beauty pageant titleholder
- Title: Puteri Indonesia Lingkungan 2015; Miss International Indonesia 2015
- Hair color: Black
- Eye color: Black
- Major competitions: Puteri Indonesia 2015; (1st Runner-up – Puteri Indonesia Lingkungan); Miss International 2015; (Unplaced)

Chintya Fabyola (born 10 February 1995 in Pontianak, West Kalimantan, Indonesia) is an Indonesian model and beauty pageant titleholder who was crowned Puteri Indonesia Lingkungan 2015, at the 19th Puteri Indonesia 2015 pageant. She represented Indonesia at the Miss International 2015 pageant.

== Personal life ==
Fabyola lives in Pontianak and she is currently student of business administration at Politeknik Negeri Pontianak, West Kalimantan, Indonesia. In 2011 Fabyola participated at Dare Pontianak pageant and placed as the 1st Runner-up. In 2013 she placed as the 1st Runner-up at the Putri Pariwisata West Kalimantan 2013. In 2015 she crowned Puteri Indonesia West Kalimantan 2015 and represented her province at the 19th annual Puteri Indonesia 2015 in Jakarta.

=== Puteri Kalimantan Barat 2014 ===
Fabyola won the regional competition of Kalimantan Barat (West Kalimantan), and she deserve to represent her province in National Competition Puteri Indonesia 2015 where she placed as 1st Runner-up and would represent Indonesia in Miss International 2015 later.

=== Puteri Indonesia 2015 ===
Fabyola represented West Kalimantan at the Puteri Indonesia 2015 on February 20, 2015, at Jakarta Convention Center, Jakarta. She crowned as Puteri Indonesia Lingkungan (Miss International Indonesia 2015). In addition, she awarded as the Best Traditional Costume (Theme: Pontianak Ethnic) and Puteri Indonesia Kalimantan 2015 (Favorite islands' princess). She is the second Puteri Indonesia contestant from West Kalimantan who was crowned as the 1st Runner-up after Sisca Amelia in 2003.

=== Miss International 2015 ===
As Puteri Indonesia Lingkungan 2015, Fabyola competed at the Miss International 2015 in Tokyo, Japan in November. Valerie Hernandez, Miss International 2014 of Puerto Rico will crown her successor at end of the event.

== See also ==
- Puteri Indonesia 2015
- Miss International 2015
- Anindya Kusuma Putri
- Gresya Amanda Maaliwuga
- Syarifah Olvah Bwefar Alhamid

Awards and achievements
Preceded by Rizka Afriandhita Edmanda	Puteri West Kalimantan; 2015	Succeeded by Kornelia Meylinda Betsyeba
Preceded by South Sumatra; Elfin Pertiwi Rappa	Puteri Indonesia Lingkungan; 2015	Succeeded by Lampung; Felicia Hwang Yi Xin
