= Remzi =

Remzi is both a Turkish surname and masculine given name. Notable people with the name include:

== Given name ==
- Remzi Başakbuğday (born 1989), Turkish taekwondo practitioner
- Remzi Çayır (born 1959), Turkish far-right politician
- Remzi Arpaci-Dusseau (born 1971), Turkish-American computer scientist
- Remzi Gür (born 1949), Turkish businessman
- Remzi Sedat İncesu (born 1972), Turkish basketball coach
- Remzi Aydın Jöntürk (1936–1987), Turkish film director
- Remzi Giray Kaçar (born 1985), Turkish footballer
- Remzi Kaplan (born 1960), German-Turkish döner kebab producer
- Remzi Musaoğlu (born 1965), Bulgarian wrestler
- Remzi Nesimi (1933–2018), Albanian linguist from North Macedonia
- Remzi Öztürk (born 1964), Turkish wrestler

== Surname ==
- Shener Remzi (born 1976), Bulgarian footballer of Turkish descent

== See also ==
- Ramzi
