= Elvira Devinamira =

Indonesian actress and model (born 1993)

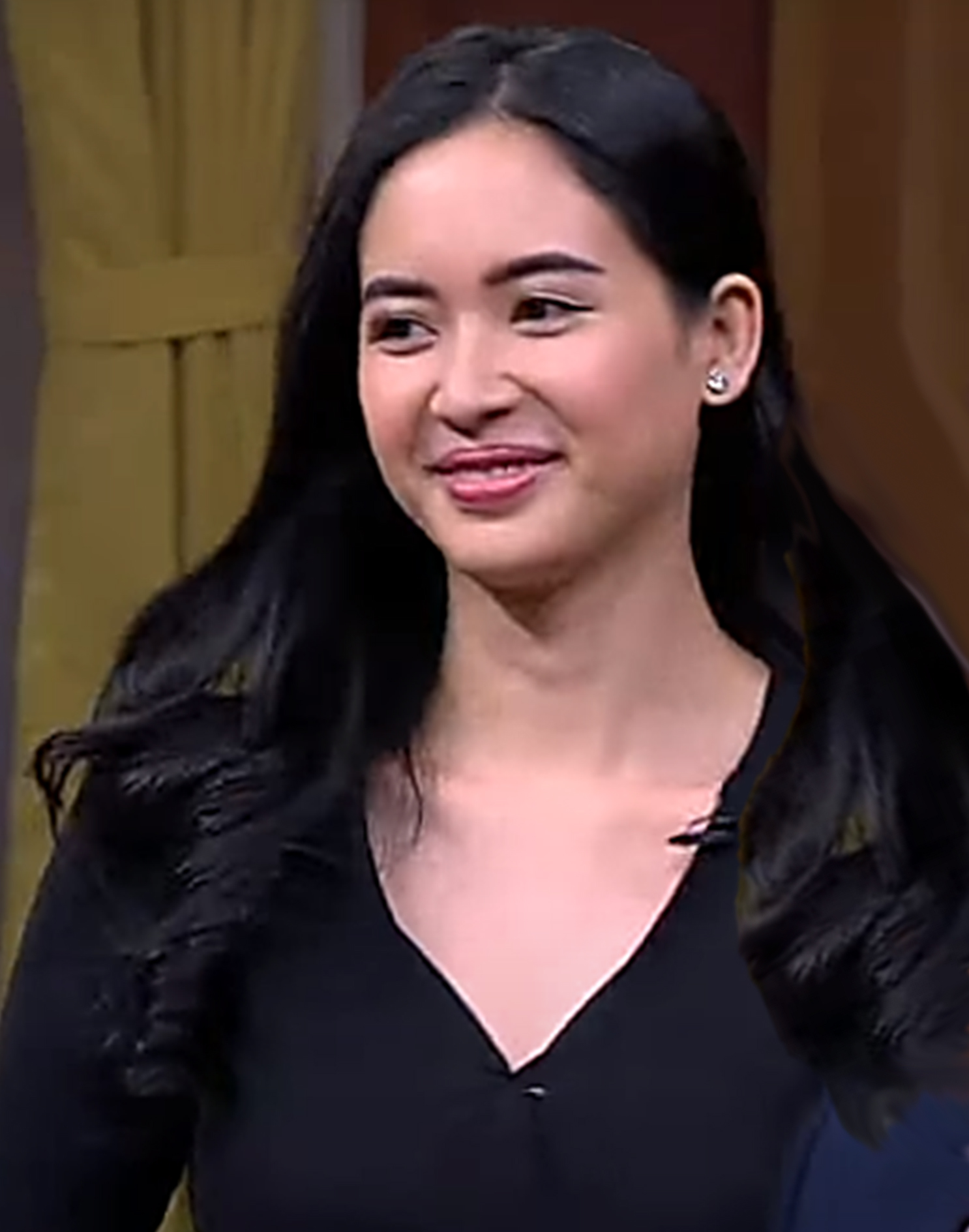
- Miss Universe Indonesia 2014, Elvira Devinamira Wirayanti on Ini Talkshow, NET TV
- Born: Elvira Devinamira Wirayanti; 28 June 1993 (age 33); Surabaya, East Java
- Education: Airlangga University
- Occupations: Actress; Model; Beauty pageant titleholder
- Height: 1.76 m (5 ft 9 in)
- Beauty pageant titleholder
- Title: Puteri Indonesia Jawa Timur 2014; Puteri Indonesia 2014; Miss Universe Indonesia 2014
- Hair color: Dark brown
- Eye color: Dark brown
- Major competitions: Puteri Indonesia Jawa Timur 2014; (Winner); Puteri Indonesia 2014; (Winner); Miss Universe 2014; (Top 15)

Elvira Devinamira Wirayanti (born 28 June 1993 in Surabaya, East Java) is an Indonesian actress, model, and beauty pageant titleholder. She was crowned Puteri Indonesia 2014, and represented her country at the Miss Universe 2014 pageant at the FIU Arena in Florida, United States, where she placed in the Top 15 and won Best National Costume for the second time, after Agni Pratistha in 2007. She is the third Indonesian and first Javanese woman to be a Miss Universe finalist.

== Early life and education ==
Elvira was born and raised in Surabaya, East Java to Javanese parents. She is the elder of two siblings. Elvira has worked as a model since she was 16. She graduated with a law degree from Airlangga University, Surabaya – East Java with Cum Laude honour. She was part of the Indonesian delegation on an exchange Model United Nations-trip program to Seoul, South Korea, for the 24th Harvard Model United Nations Conference in 2011, and was part of the Indonesian delegation at Harvard National Model United Nations Conference 2012 in Boston, United States.

== Pageantry ==
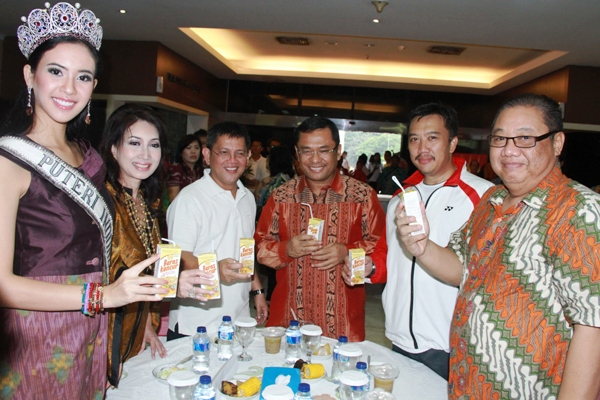
Elvira at the Jamu Event with Ministry of Industry and Ministry of Youth and Sport of The Republic of Indonesia.

=== Cak Ning Surabaya ===
Before stepping into the field of pageantry, Elvira took part in Local Tourism Beauty Pageant of her hometown Surabaya, called "Cak Ning Surabaya", where she was chosen as the 1st Runner-up.

=== Puteri Indonesia East Java 2014 ===
Elvira joined the contest at the provincial level of the Puteri Indonesia East Java 2014, and was chosen as the winner of Puteri Indonesia East Java 2014.

=== Puteri Indonesia 2014 ===
After qualifying for the provincial title of Puteri Indonesia East Java 2014, Elvira represented the province of East Java in the national beauty contest, Puteri Indonesia 2014, which was held in Jakarta Convention Center, Jakarta, Indonesia on 29 January 2014. Elvira was selected as the winner of Puteri Indonesia 2014 (Miss Universe Indonesia 2014),

Elvira was crowned by her predecessor, Whulandary Herman (Puteri Indonesia 2013 and Top 16 Miss Universe 2013) of West Sumatra. Elvira was crowned together with Elfin Pertiwi Rappa as Puteri Indonesia Lingkungan 2014 (Miss International Indonesia 2014) and Lily Estelita Liana as Puteri Indonesia Pariwisata 2014 (Miss Supranational Indonesia 2014). The final coronation night was graced by the reigning Miss Universe 2013, Gabriela Isler of Venezuela as the selection committee.

=== Miss Universe 2014 ===
As the winner of Puteri Indonesia 2014, Elvira represented Indonesia at the 63rd edition of Miss Universe 2014 in Doral, Miami, Florida - United States, where she continued Indonesia's stake in the Miss Universe pageant by placing in the semifinals for a consecutive second time, finishing as a "Top 15 semifinalist" and winning "Best National Costume".

Elvira brought a national costume with the Borobudur Temple-inspired ensemble, the world largest Buddhist temple, in Magelang, Indonesia. The costume named "The Chronicle of Borobudur" designed by Jember Fashion Carnival. This is the second time for Indonesia to won "Best National Costume" award after Agni Pratistha in Miss Universe 2007. She is also wearing evening gown named "Mystical Silent Maja" inspired by X-Men character, the gown designed by anaz khairunnas. Nicknamed a gown after an "X-Men" character because of the scalelike sequins that change color from silver to pink when she moves her hand up or down the dress, In the comics, Mystique's superpower is mimicking the voice and appearance of any person.

== Filmography ==
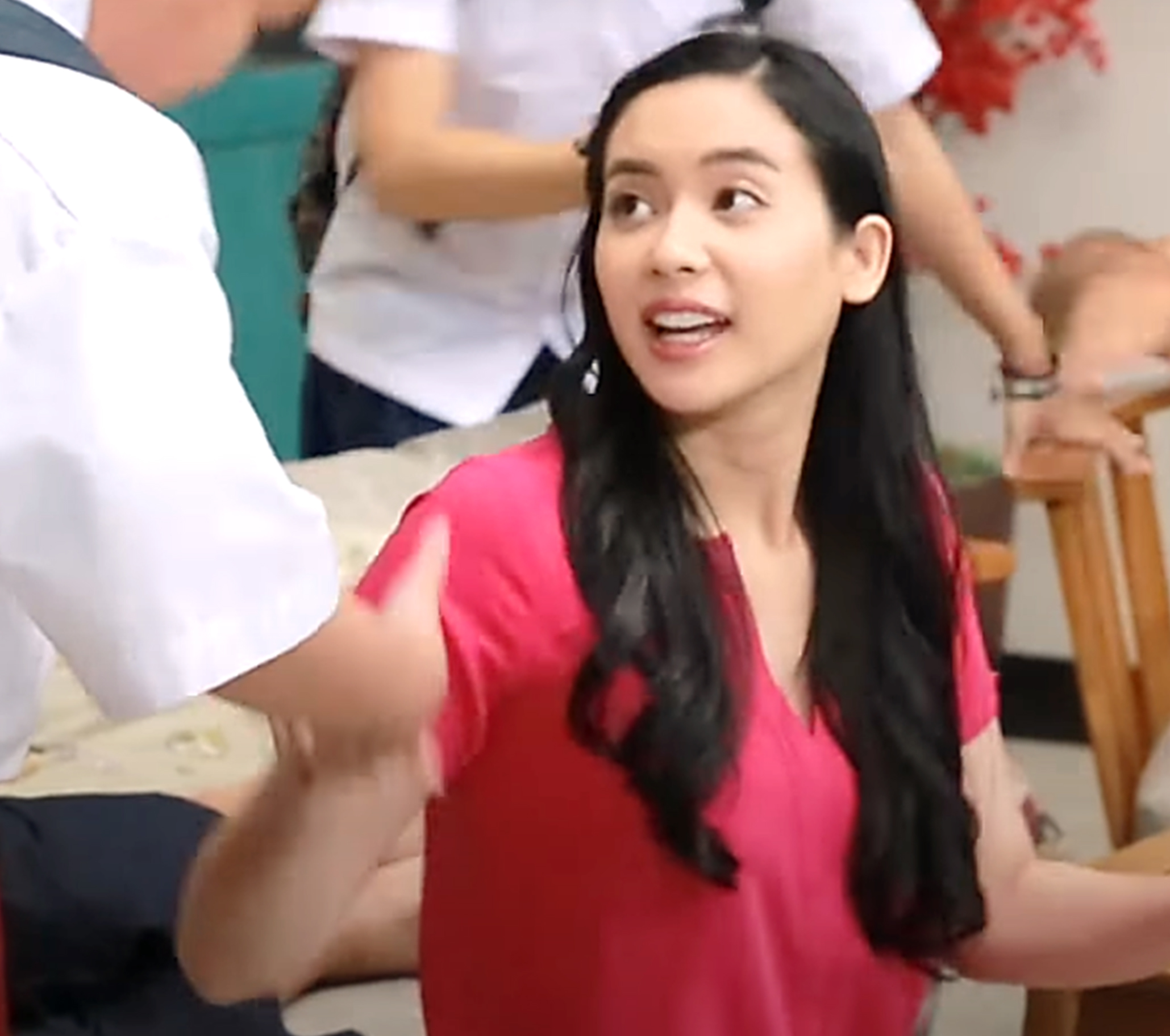
Miss Universe Indonesia 2014, Elvira Devinamira Wirayanti at Keluarga Besar, NET TV.

After returning to Indonesia, Elvira received an offer to act in a film directed by Ram Soraya and John de Rantau entitled Single, andDilarang Menyanyi di Kamar Mandi. Elvira told media she was proud to have acted with a number of famous actors and actresses such as Raditya Dika, Rina Hasyim, Pandji Pragiwaksono, Surya Saputra and Seno Gumira Ajidarma. Since then, Elvira has appeared in several film and television films in Indonesia.

=== Movies ===
Year	Title	Genre	Role	Film Production	Ref.
2015	Single	comedy movies	as Vina	Ram Soraya	
2019	Dilarang Menyanyi di Kamar Mandi	romance film	as Sophie	John de Rantau	

=== TV Films ===
Year	Title	Genre	Role	TV Network	Ref.
2017-2020	Keluarga Besar	drama	as Bunga	NET.TV	
2023-2024	Kitab Kencan	drama	as Kelly Kuswandi	NET.TV	

== See also ==
- Puteri Indonesia 2014
- Miss Universe 2014
- Elfin Pertiwi Rappa
- Lily Estelita Liana

Awards and achievements
Preceded by Asri Nofalya Kamalin	Puteri East Java; 2014	Succeeded by Sheryltha Pratyscha
Preceded by West Sumatra – Whulandary Herman	Puteri Indonesia; 2014	Succeeded by Central Java – Anindya Kusuma
