= Anindya Kusuma Putri =

Indonesian actress, model, TV host and beauty pageant titleholder

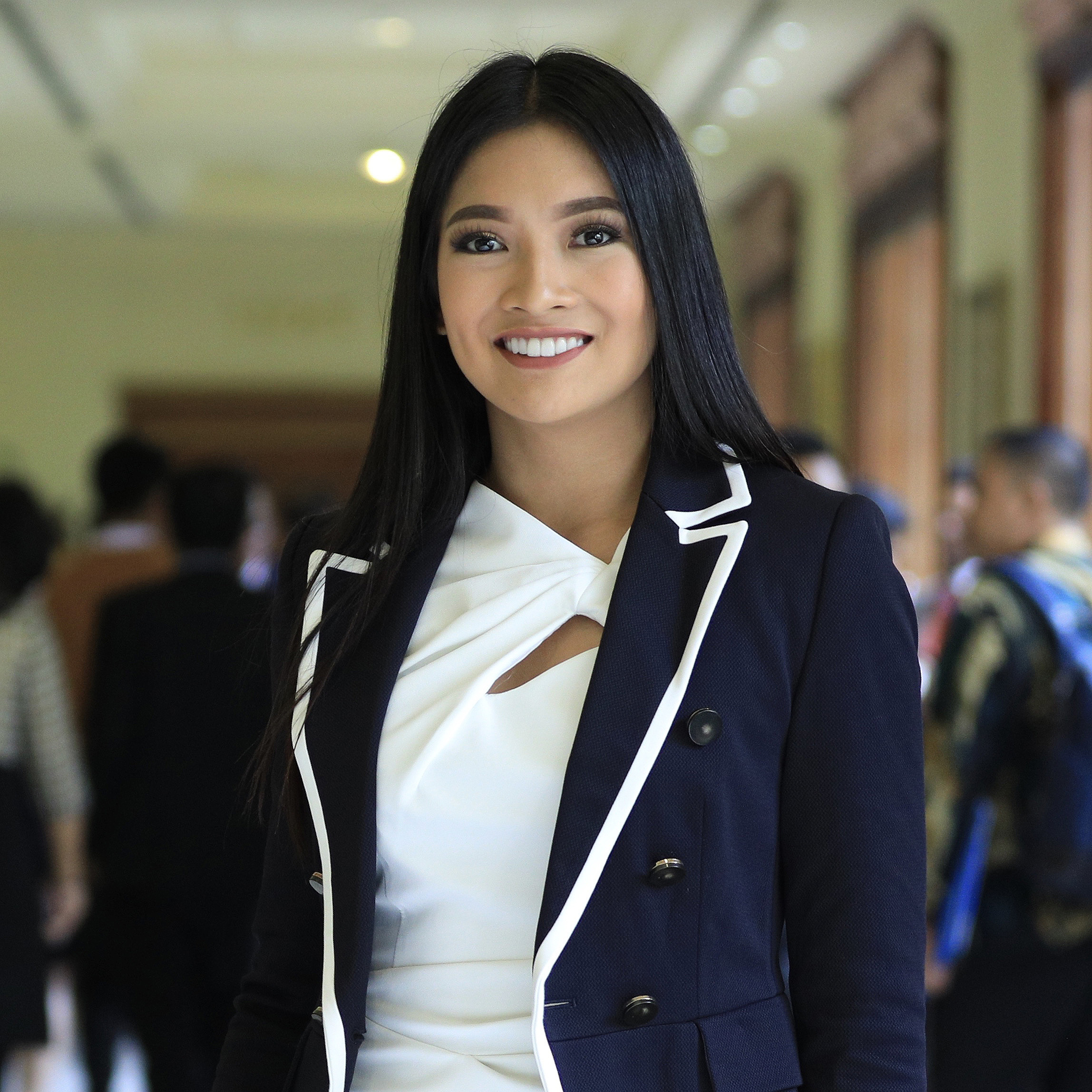
- Anindya Kusuma Putri in 2017
- Born: Anindya Kusuma Putri; 3 February 1992 (age 34); Semarang, Central Java, Indonesia
- Education: Diponegoro University; INTO World Education Centre University
- Height: 1.76 m (5 ft 9 in)
- Beauty pageant titleholder
- Title: Puteri Indonesia 2015; Miss Universe Indonesia 2015
- Hair color: Black
- Eye color: Black
- Major competitions: Puteri Indonesia 2015; (Winner); Miss Universe 2015; (Top 15)

Anindya Kusuma Putri (born 3 February 1992) is an Indonesian actress, model, TV host and beauty pageant titleholder who was crowned Puteri Indonesia 2015. She represented her country at the Miss Universe 2015 pageant. She is the fourth Indonesian and the second Javanese to be called as Miss Universe Finalist.

== Early life and career ==
Anindya was born and raised in Semarang and graduated in 2016 as Bachelor of Engineering from Urban and Regional Planning at Diponegoro University, Semarang, Indonesia. Previously, she was President of the AIESEC International Youth Organization at her university and did social projects. In 2008, she won the title of Gadis Sampul 2008. In 2011, she placed as the 1st Runner-up of Puteri Indonesia Central Java 2011 where Maria Selena won the title and was later crowned as the Puteri Indonesia 2011. She represented Indonesia at The 41st Ship for South East Asian and Japanese Youth Program in 2014 and was selected as chairwoman for Sub-Committee of Solidarity Group. In 2015 she returned to compete at the same pageant and won. She represented her province at the 19th annual Puteri Indonesia 2015 pageant and became the winner. Eleven months after her win, she represented Indonesia at the 64th Miss Universe competition, held in Las Vegas, Nevada, United States. Following the Miss Universe, Anindya worked as the Spokesperson for the Ministry of Youth and Sports of the Republic of Indonesia in 2017–2018. She resigned from her role in the Ministry after she got accepted in a INTO World Education Centre University in London - Great Britain and finished her second Bachelor Degree of Business of Administration in August 2019.

== Pageantry ==
=== Puteri Indonesia 2015 ===
Anindya is the third woman from Central Java to win Puteri Indonesia after Agni Pratistha in 2006 and Maria Selena in 2011. Anindya was crowned as the winner of Puteri Indonesia 2015 on February 20, 2015, at Jakarta Convention Center, Jakarta. The runners-up were Chintya Fabyola of West Kalimantan and Gresya Amanda Maaliwuga of North Sulawesi. Altogether, thirty seven ladies from 33 provinces competed at the 19th Puteri Indonesia 2015 pageant. Paulina Vega, Miss Universe 2014 attended the event and accompanied Anindya in her victory walk.

=== Miss Universe 2015 ===
As Puteri Indonesia 2015, Anindya competed at the Miss Universe 2015 pageant where she placed in the top fifteen. Pia Wurtzbach of the Philippines won the title of Miss Universe 2015.

After the competition, she has successfully organized and hosted the Miss Universe 2015 reunion in Indonesia twice (2018 and 2019).

== Filmography ==
Anindya has appeared in several movies. She has acted in the cinema box-office film.

=== Movies ===
Year	Title	Genre	Role	Film Production	Ref.
2014	Ku Kejar Cinta Ke Negeri Cina	Comedy, Drama, Romance	as Receptionist		
2018	Sultan Agung: Tahta, Perjuangan, Cinta	Action, Drama, History	as Ratu Batang or Sultan Agung Princess	Hanung Bramantyo	

=== Television programmes ===
Year	Title	Genre	Role	TV Production	Ref.
2015–2018	Jejak Petualang	adventure	Herself	Trans7	
2018–present	My Trip My Adventure	adventure	Herself	Trans TV	

== See also ==
- Puteri Indonesia 2015
- Miss Universe 2015
- Chintya Fabyola
- Gresya Amanda Maaliwuga
- Syarifah Olvah Bwefar Alhamid

Awards and achievements
Preceded by Rakhmi Wijiharti	Puteri Central Java; 2015	Succeeded by Disma Ajeng Rastiti
Preceded by East Java – Elvira Devinamira Wirayanti	Puteri Indonesia; 2015	Succeeded by North Sulawesi – Kezia Roslin Cikita Warouw
