= Novia Indriani Mamuaja =

Indonesian beauty pageant titleholder (born 1994)

- Born: Novia Indriani Mamuaja; November 9, 1994 (age 31); Manado, North Sulawesi
- Height: 1.70 m (5 ft 7 in)
- Beauty pageant titleholder
- Title: Puteri Indonesia 2013 3rd Runner-up
- Hair color: Black
- Eye color: Black
- Major competitions: Puteri Indonesia 2013 (3rd Runner-up); Miss Grand International 2013

Novia Indriani Mamuaja (born November 9, 1994) is an Indonesian beauty pageant titleholder. She was crowned 3rd Runner-up at Puteri Indonesia 2013 and represented her country at Miss Grand International 2013.

== Life ==
Novia Mamuaja was born in Manado, North Sulawesi, and studied at SMA Katolik Rex Mundi Manado. She joined the national flag-hoisting team (Paskibraka) 2011. Mamuaja had success in local pageants: she was crowned Miss SMP Don Bosco Manado 2009, Putri SMA Rex Mundi Manado 2010, Nona Manado 2012 and Nona Fotogenic 2012. She was 1st Runner-up at Noni Manado 2012.

She likes to campaign against violence and drugs.

Awards and achievements
Preceded by Monica Septiani Satriawan	Puteri South Sumatra; 2012-2013	Succeeded by Maria Rizky Chrisliany
Preceded by New Title	Puteri Indonesia Lingkungan; 2012-2013	Succeeded by Jakarta SCR 2 – Noor Zabilla Soeprapto
