= Indonesian Dangdut Awards =

- Current: 2016 Indonesian Dangdut Awards
- Awarded for: Outstanding achievements in the music industry
- Country: Indonesia
- Presented by: Indosiar
- First award: June 11, 2014; 12 years ago
- Website: Official website

Television/radio coverage
- Network: Indosiar
- Runtime: 180 minutes
- Produced by: Indra Yudhistira

The Indonesian Dangdut Awards are annual Indonesian awards that are presented by Indosiar television station, which recognize popularity in the music industry dangdut genre. The annual show was first held on June 11, 2014. The annual presentation ceremony features performances by prominent artists, and the presentation of those awards that have a more popular interest.

== Ceremonies ==
The inaugural ceremony in 2014 was held at the Teater Tanah Airku, Taman Mini Indonesia Indah on the East Jakarta. In 2015, the Studio 5 Indosiar in West Jakarta hosted the awards. The ceremony was moved to the Studio 6 Emtek City at West Jakarta Live in 2016.

Year	Date	Host(s)	Venue	Host city	Theme	Ref.
2014	June 11, 2014	Ramzi; Rina Nose; Irfan Hakim; Ivan Gunawan	Teater Tanah Airku, Taman Mini Indonesia Indah	East Jakarta	Dangdut Untuk Semua	
2015	October 28, 2015	Irfan Hakim; Rina Nose; Andhika Pratama; Ramzi; Audi Marissa; Gading Marten	Studio 5 Indosiar	West Jakarta	Dangdut Adalah Kita	
2016	November 9, 2016	Ramzi; Ria Nose; Andhika Pratama; Irfan Hakim	Studio 6 Emtek City	West Jakarta	Bangga Dangdut Indonesia	

== History ==
This award was created the first time by Indosiar because of the success of the program D'Academy is a talent search dangdut song competition. The show also has successfully published a best dangdut singer. Finally, in 2014, Indosiar created the program Indonesian Dangdut Awards, the first night, judges and the graduated from talent search competition to enliven the event, and other top dangdut singer. The event is made, to appreciate the talented Indonesian dangdut singer. On the eve of the celebration, Rina Nose, Ramzi, Irfan Hakim, and Ivan Gunawan served as host.

== Award process ==
The nominees and award winners are selected based selection of the most popular viewers via SMS. While the election has its own special award from the organizers. All awards through the verification team Indosiar and music observers. For a special award will be chosen by the judges.

== Categories ==
From 2014 to 2016, the show had the same categories and category names every year. In 2014, totaling 8 categories, each winner will get one trophy. There is also one special nominations, namely "Dangdut Share" given to 5 dangdut musicians. In 2015, the category increased to 11 and in 2016 became 10.

=== Current categories ===
The most important categories are Dangdut Singer Male Solo Popular, Dangdut Singer Female Solo Popular, Group/Duo Dangdut Popular and Dangdut Song Popular. These categories highlighted in each award.

- Dangdut Singer Male Solo Most Popular
- Dangdut Singer Female Solo Most Popular
- New Arrivals Male Most Popular
- New Arrivals Female Most Popular
- Group/Duo Dangdut Most Popular
- Dangdut Song Most Popular
- Best Costume Dangdut Appearance
- Special Award for Songwriters
- Dangdut singer Social Media Darling

=== Retired categories ===
- Video Clips Dangdut Most Popular (in 2015)
- Dangdut Songwriters Popular (in 2014 to 2015)
- Dangdut Shake Most Popular (in 2014)
- Local Language Dangdut Songs Most Popular (in 2014)

=== Special awards ===
==== Dangdut Share ====
- 2014: Mara Karma
- 2014: Ellya Khadam
- 2014: Munif Bahasuan
- 2014: Denny Albar
- 2014: Ida Laila

==== Lifetime Achievement Award ====
- 2015: Mara Karma
- 2016: Rita Sugiarto

== Multiple wins and nominations ==
Most Wins

Year	2014	2015	2016
Artist	Nurbayan	Cita Citata	Ayu Ting Ting; Rizki Ridho
Total	2	2	2

Most Nominations

Year	2014	2015	2016
Artist	Nurbayan	Cita Citata	Ayu Ting Ting
Total	4	4	3

== Ratings ==
Year	Day	Date	Network	Household rating	Viewers (in millions)	Ref.
2014	Wednesday	June 11	Indosiar	4.1	17.3	
2015	Wednesday	October 28	Indosiar	4.4	23.1	
2016	Wednesday	November 9	Indosiar	4.1	18.9	

== See also ==
- List of Asian television awards
- Music of Indonesia
