= S. Olvah Alhamid =

Indonesian model

- شريفة ألفه الحامد
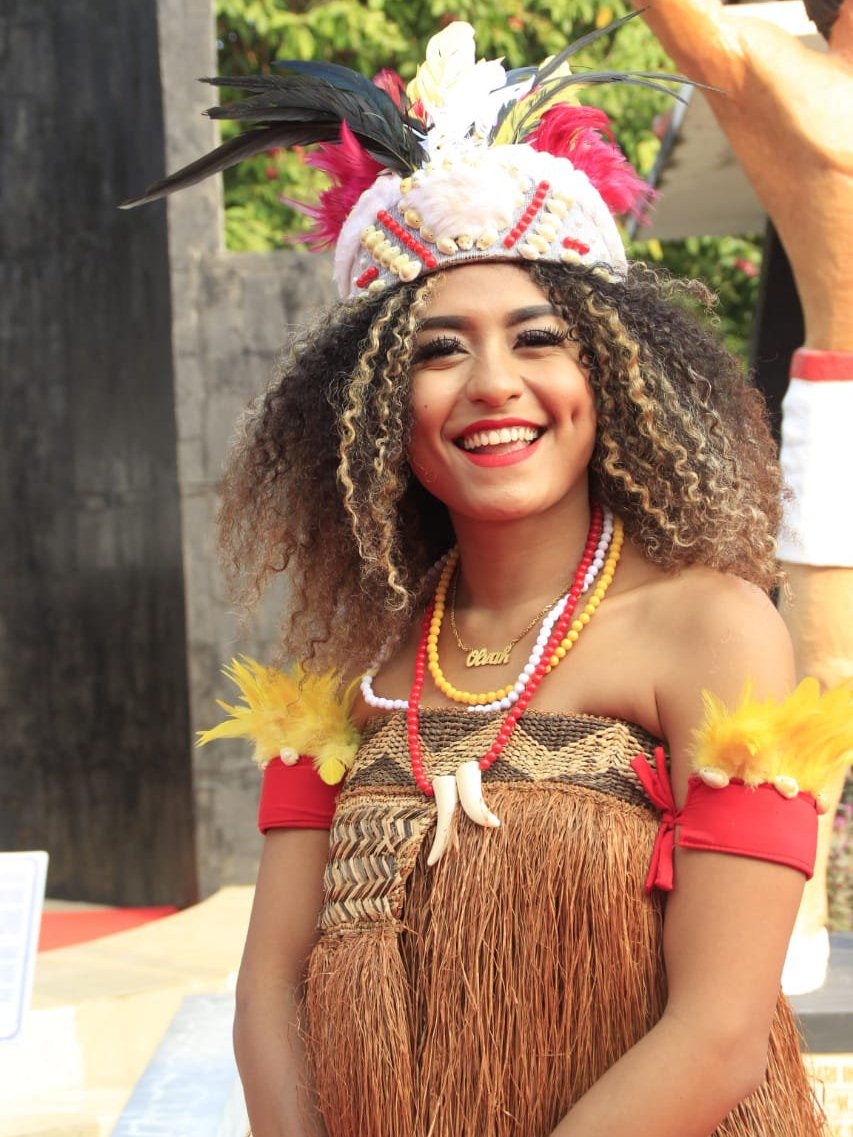
- S. Olvah Alhamid as the Puteri Indonesia West Papua 2015 during the 2018 Asian Games torch ignition event with traditional clothing representing the island of Papua.
- Born: Syarifah Olvah Bwefar Alhamid; March 24, 1990 (age 36); Kaimana Regency, Irian Jaya
- Other name: Olvah Alhamid Bwefar
- Education: 5 State Senior High School of Surabaya (2003–2007); University of Indonesia (Bachelor of Economics; 2007–2012); University of Groningen (Bachelor of Science; 2010–2013)
- Occupation: Model
- Height: 172 cm (5 ft 8 in)
- Beauty pageant titleholder
- Title: Puteri Indonesia West Papua 2015; Miss Eco Universe Indonesia 2016
- Years active: 2015–present
- Hair color: Black
- Eye color: Black
- Major competitions: Puteri Indonesia 2015 (Top 5) (Peace Ambassador); Miss Eco Universe 2016 (Top 16) (Best National Costume)

Syarifah Olvah Bwefar Alhamid (Arabic: شريفة ألفه الحامد, romanized: Šarīfah ʾUlfah al-Ḥāmid; Arabic pronunciation: [ʃariːfah ˈ(ʔ)ulfah alħaːmid]; born March 24, 1990), better known as S. Olvah Alhamid is an Indonesian model from Kaimana Regency and became the first Papuan women who won the title of Puteri Indonesia Perdamaian, precisely at the beauty pageant of Puteri Indonesia 2015. For her victory in the Top 5 Puteri Indonesia 2015, Olvah then appointed by the Puteri Indonesia Foundation to represent Indonesia in the Miss Eco Universe 2016 beauty pageant held in Egypt. At the pageant, he managed to occupy the Top 16 position and also won best national costume with costume named 'Bird of Paradise'.

== Biography ==
=== Early life ===
Olvah was born in Kaimana Regency to a father of Arab Hadhrami descendant of Ba 'Alawi sada clan named Salim Alhamid and Papuan mother named Aki Maryam Bwefar. Olvah is the third child of 5 siblings, her four siblings are S. Mardiah Alhamid, S. Nurnissa Alhamid, Khalid Alhamid, and Luth Alhamid.

=== Education ===
Olvah is a graduate of 5 State Senior High School of Surabaya in 2007. Furthermore, she continued her study to the University of Indonesia majoring in Development Economics. In 2010, she entered the University of Indonesia International Class Program at University of Groningen majoring in International Business and Management. In 2013 she graduated with a thesis entitled 'Customer Involvement Increases Customer Satisfaction' and received a double degree from University of Indonesia (Bachelor of Economics, Indonesian: Sarjana Ekonomi or abbreviated as S.E.) and University of Groningen (Bachelor of Science).

== Beauty pageant ==
=== Puteri Indonesia 2015 ===
Olvah represent her province Papua at Puteri Indonesia 2015, where she finished at the "Top-5" finalist, the highest than any other Papuan representative at the pageant.

=== Miss Eco Universe 2016 ===
Olvah represent Indonesia in the Miss Eco Universe 2016 held in Hurghada – Egypt, she became the first Indonesian to compete for the title of Miss Eco Universe pageant. She finally finished on the "Top 16" and won "Best National Costume" with her costume named "Bird of Paradise", that was made from 100% eco-friendly material, the costume itself was inspired from the diversity of birds in Papua.

== See also ==
- Puteri Indonesia 2015
- Miss Eco International 2016
- Anindya Kusuma Putri
- Chintya Fabyola
- Gresya Amanda Maaliwuga

Awards and achievements
| Preceded by Eklevina Aprilia Rumpampono | Puteri Indonesia West Papua; 2015 | Succeeded by Lita Ayudiah M |
| Preceded by Noor Zabilla Bambang Soeprapto | Puteri Indonesia Runner-Up 3; 2015 | Succeeded by Ariska Putri Pertiwi |
| Preceded by - | Miss Eco Indonesia; 2016 | Succeeded by Annisa Ananda Nusyirwan |
