= Borobudur Writers and Cultural Festival =

Borobudur Writers and Cultural Festival (BWCF) is an annual meet for fiction and nonfiction writers, content creators, culture activist dan and inter religion with theme to stimulate the participants to realize the uniqueness and richness of various literary, artistic and religious thoughts in the archipelago. (Note: Before the opening of BWCF, the executive committee and curator conduct a study of the themes to be appointed, followed by selecting speakers, the location of the event, and curating prospective participants. The results were delivered in Jakarta at a press conference.) The opening of this international scale event was held in 2012 and took place in Yogyakarta, and Borobudur Magelang for the other event. (Note: In addition to these two locations, BWCF was also held in other places, including Pabelan Islamic Boarding School, Progo River, and others, adjusting with the theme.) BWCF Participants consists of writers, writers, musicians, dancers, artists, reporters, historians, sociologists, archaeologists, philologists, anthropologists, scientists, humanists and theologians. For two full days, participants were invited to discuss, attend symposiums, attend workshop classes, attend book launches, read temple relief tours, yoga and meditation classes in the courtyard of the Borobudur Temple, watching film screenings, and watching art performances at Aksobya Square. (Note: All selected participants get facilities such as accommodation, consumption, and local transportation during the event.) At the end of the event, BWCF handed over Sang Hyang Kamahayanikan Award to leaders, individuals or groups, who were seen as having a major contribution in the field of arts - culture and humanities in the community.

== Important figures ==
=== Founder ===
- Seno Joko Suyono
- Imam Muhtarom
- Mudji Sutrisno, S.J
- Yoke Darmawan

=== Advisors ===
- Prof. Dr. Toeti Heraty
- Prof. Dr. Oman Fathurahman
- Dr. Hudaya Kandahjaya
- Dr. Agus Widiatmoko

=== Permanent curator and BWCF manager ===
- Mudji Sutrisno SJ
- Seno Joko Suyono
- Imam Muhtahrom
- Yessy Apriati

== Organizer ==
- Samana Foundation, 2012-2016
- BWCF Society, 2017-now

== Theme ==
Year	Theme
2012	Archipelago's Memory and Imagination: The Great Deliberation of Silat Writers and Archipelago History
2013	Backflow: Spice Memory and Bahari Nusantara
2014	Ratu Adil: Power and Rebellion in the Archipelago
2015	Mountains and mythology in the archipelago
2016	Celebrating 200 Years of Serat Centhini
2017	Gandawyuha and the Search for Religiosity of Religions in the Archipelago
2018	Traveling & Diary, Rereading Foreign Visitors Daily Records of the Archipelago

== Sang Hyang Kamahayanikan Award ==
BWCF awarded Sang Hyang Kamahayanikan Award to:

Year	Recipient's name	Dedication
2012	SH Mintardja	Pioneer of genre silat Literature
2013	AB Lapian	Historian, for his research on the world of maritime affairs in Indonesia
2014	Peter Carey	Historian who writes history of Pangeran Diponegoro Java's war
2015	Hadi Sidomulyo (Nigel Bullough)	Historian who have studied and reveal the names of villages in the Nagarakretagama
2016	Halilintar Latief	Empowering the monk community in South Sulawesi
2016	Kartono Kamajaya	Historian who translate and Latinized the Serat Centhini
2017	Prof. Dr. Noerhadi Magetsari	Conducting research, writing a book about Borobudur studies which departed from Sutra studies, the most comprehensive study that has emerged from Indonesian academic circles
2018	Dr. Tan Ta Sen	Researcher from Singapore who are dedicated to finding out Zheng He trips in the Southeast Asia Region including the Archipelago. Dr Tan Ta Sen also founded the Cheng Ho museum and open it to the public

== See also ==
- Borobudur
