= Ramzi =

Ramzi or Ramzy (Arabic: رمزي) is a masculine given name and surname of Arabic origin. It may refer to:

== Given name ==
Ramzi

- Ramzi Abed (born 1973), American film director, founder of "Bloodshot Pictures" and founding member of the electronic group, Elektracity
- Ramzi Abid (born 1980), Canadian ice hockey player
- Ramzi Aouad, Australian triple murderer
- Ramzi Attaie, Iranian admiral
- Ramzi Aya (born 1990) Italian footballer
- Ramzi Boukhiam (born 1993), Moroccan surfer
- Ramzi Bourakba (born 1984), Algerian footballer
- Ramzi Chouchar (born 1997), Algerian swimmer
- Ramzi Irani (1966–2002), Lebanese Forces student representative
- Ramzi Mohammed (born 1981), Somali terrorist
- Ramzi Rahaman (born 1954), Sri Lankan fashion designer and hairdresser
- Ramzi Saleh (born 1980), Palestinian footballer
- Ramzi Ben Sliman (born 1982), French film director and screenwriter
- Ramzi bin al-Shibh (born 1972), Yemeni held in Guantanamo
- Kamal Ramzi Stino (1910–1987), Egyptian Deputy Prime Minister
- Ramzi Yassa (born 1948), Egyptian pianist
- Ramzi Ben Younès (born 1978), Tunisian footballer
- Ramzi Yousef (born 1968), Kuwaiti terrorist

Ramzy

- Ramzy Al Duhami (born 1972), Saudi Arabian show jumping rider
- Ramzy Bedia (born 1972), Algerian-French actor

== Surname ==
Ramzi

- Adil Ramzi (born 1977), Moroccan footballer
- Omar 'The White Sudani' Ramzi (born 1983), Sudanese stand-up comedian
- Rashid Ramzi (born 1980), Moroccan athlete
- Soheir Ramzi (born 1950), Egyptian actress

Ramzy

- Ahmed Ramzy (1930–2012), Egyptian actor
- Ahmed Ramzy (footballer) (born 1965), Egyptian footballer
- Bashir Ramzy (born 1979), American long jumper
- Hany Ramzy (born 1969), Egyptian footballer
- Hossam Ramzy (1953–2019), Egyptian percussionist and composer
- Ramzy Ezzeldin Ramzy (born 1954), Egyptian politician and diplomat

== See also ==
- Remzi (disambiguation), Turkish variant of the name Ramzi
- Ramsay (surname)
- Ramsey (surname)
