= Puteri Indonesia 2015 =

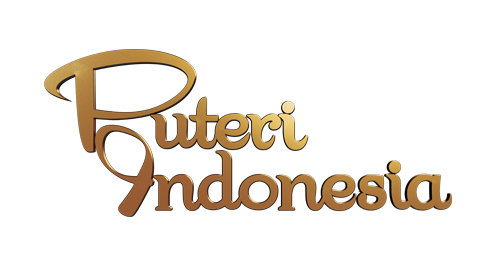
- Puteri Indonesia 2015
- Date: February 20, 2015
- Presenters: Altaf Vicko, Aubry Beer, Choky Sitohang, Rahma Landy,
- Entertainment: Bunga Citra Lestari, Cakra Khan, Christopher Abimanyu, Iis Dahlia, Kevin Aprilio & Tristan, Marcell Siahaan, Rossa, Sruti Respati
- Venue: Jakarta Convention Center, Jakarta, Indonesia
- Broadcaster: Indosiar
- Entrants: 37
- Placements: 10
- Withdrawals: Gorontalo
- Winner: Anindya Kusuma Putri; Central Java

Puteri Indonesia 2015, the 19th Puteri Indonesia pageant, was held on February 20, 2015 at Plenary Hall, Jakarta Convention Center, Jakarta, Indonesia. Elvira Devinamira, Puteri Indonesia 2014 of East Java crowned her successor Anindya Kusuma Putri of Central Java at the end of the event.

Thirty-seven contestants from 33 provinces competed for the crown. The winner represented Indonesia at the Miss Universe 2015, while the runners-up competed at the Miss International 2015 and Miss Supranational 2015 pageants.

Paulina Vega, Miss Universe 2014 of Colombia attended the Grand Final Show. The event was broadcast live on Indonesian television network Indosiar.

== Results ==
=== Main ===
The Crowns of Puteri Indonesia Title Holders

Puteri Indonesia 2015 (Miss Universe Indonesia 2015)
Puteri Indonesia Lingkungan 2015 (Miss International Indonesia 2015)
Puteri Indonesia Pariwisata 2015 (Miss Supranational Indonesia 2015)

Final Results	Contestant	International Placement
Puteri Indonesia 2015 (Miss Universe Indonesia)	Central Java: Anindya Kusuma Putri	Top 15 – Miss Universe 2015
Puteri Indonesia Lingkungan 2015 (Miss International Indonesia)	West Kalimantan: Chintya Fabyola	Unplaced – Miss International 2015
Puteri Indonesia Pariwisata 2015 (Miss Supranational Indonesia)	North Sulawesi: Gresya Amanda Maaliwuga	Unplaced – Miss Supranational 2015
Top 5	Lampung: Laras Maranatha Tobing; West Papua: Syarifah Olvah Bwefar Alhamid	
Top 10	Central Sulawesi: Morisca Ramadhani Tamunu; East Nusa Tenggara: Maria Carolina Theresa Noge; Jakarta SCR 5: Stephanie Aurelrica Tassya Yoe; Jambi: Riska Edith Suzani; West Java: Lestari Adhelia	

== Contestants ==
37 Contestants have been confirmed. The information from Puteri Indonesia Official website.

Province	Name	Age	Height	Hometown
Aceh	Jeyskia Ayunda Sembiring	21	171 cm (5 ft 7 1/2 in)	Lhokseumawe
North Sumatra	Farhannisa Suri Maimoon Nasution	22	170 cm (5 ft 7 in)	Medan
West Sumatra	Dara Anggun Sasra Sugiri	22	177 cm (5 ft 9 1/2 in)	Sioban, Mentawai Islands
Riau	Nabila Octasya	19	170 cm (5 ft 7 in)	Pekanbaru
Riau Islands	Tiara Chairany Permata Dely	20	173 cm (5 ft 8 in)	Tanjung Pinang
Jambi	Riska Edith Suzani	22	173 cm (5 ft 8 in)	Jambi
South Sumatra	Desti Indah Rizky	19	175 cm (5 ft 9 in)	Prabumulih
Bangka Belitung	Rebeka Steven	25	173 cm (5 ft 8 in)	Sungailiat
Bengkulu	Hany Meiyana	19	171 cm (5 ft 7 1/2 in)	Bengkulu
Lampung	Laras Maranatha Tobing	24	170 cm (5 ft 7 in)	Bandar Lampung
Jakarta Special Capital Region 1	Anastasia Herzigova Mustikandrina	22	175 cm (5 ft 9 in)	Jakarta
Jakarta Special Capital Region 2	Ra. Cania Marsha Arantxa Suryo	25	168 cm (5 ft 6 in)	Jakarta
Jakarta Special Capital Region 3	Erna Tan	20	175 cm (5 ft 9 in)	Jakarta
Jakarta Special Capital Region 4	Fiona Rahmadita Anggraeni	24	170 cm (5 ft 7 in)	Jakarta
Jakarta Special Capital Region 5	Stephanie Aurelrica Tassya Yoe	23	170 cm (5 ft 7 in)	Jakarta
Jakarta Special Capital Region 6	Annisa Panjani	23	170 cm (5 ft 7 in)	Jakarta
Banten	Riri Anangningdyah Wibisono	20	175 cm (5 ft 9 in)	Tangerang
West Java	Lestari Adhelia	25	170 cm (5 ft 7 in)	Bekasi
Central Java	Anindya Kusuma Putri	23	176 cm (5 ft 9 1/2 in)	Semarang
Yogyakarta Special Region	Annisa Yunas Hermanto	21	171 cm (5 ft 7 1/2 in)	Sleman
East Java	Sheryltha Pratyscha	20	172 cm (5 ft 7 1/2 in)	Malang
Bali	Ni Made Lia Tansarini	20	172 cm (5 ft 7 1/2 in)	Denpasar
West Nusa Tenggara	Baiq Dwindy Amelia Haq	19	182 cm (5 ft 11 1/2 in)	Mataram
East Nusa Tenggara	Maria Carolina Theresa Noge	20	172 cm (5 ft 7 1/2 in)	Ngada
West Kalimantan	Chintya Fabyola	20	170 cm (5 ft 7 in)	Pontianak
South Kalimantan	Rasuna Selvia	21	165 cm (5 ft 5 in)	Banjarmasin
Central Kalimantan	Yesi Anggraeni	18	167 cm (5 ft 5 1/2 in)	Kapuas
East Kalimantan	Dina Noviyanti	19	172 cm (5 ft 7 1/2 in)	Tenggarong
Southeast Sulawesi	Apriliani Puspitawati	25	165 cm (5 ft 5 in)	Mata'ohalu
West Sulawesi	Hasrima Dewi Magfira	18	168 cm (5 ft 6 in)	Mamuju
South Sulawesi	Dewi Anggraeni Lamuda	20	173 cm (5 ft 8 in)	Masamba
Central Sulawesi	Morisca Ramadhani Tamunu	23	170 cm (5 ft 7 in)	Luwuk
North Sulawesi	Gresya Amanda Maaliwuga	19	175 cm (5 ft 9 in)	Manado
Maluku	Shella Esti Leatemina	24	169 cm (5 ft 6 1/2 in)	Ambon
North Maluku	Nazilla Putri Daeng Barang	20	172 cm (5 ft 7 1/2 in)	Ternate
Papua	Dian Aryanti	21	165 cm (5 ft 5 in)	Jayapura
West Papua	Syarifah Olvah Bwefar Alhamid	24	172 cm (5 ft 7 1/2 in)	Kaimana

=== Withdraws ===
- Gorontalo: Due to health issues Abharina Putri confirmed to withdraw in 2015 edition.
