= Marisa Sartika Maladewi =

Miss International Indonesia 2013, Indonesian supermodel and beauty pageant titleholder

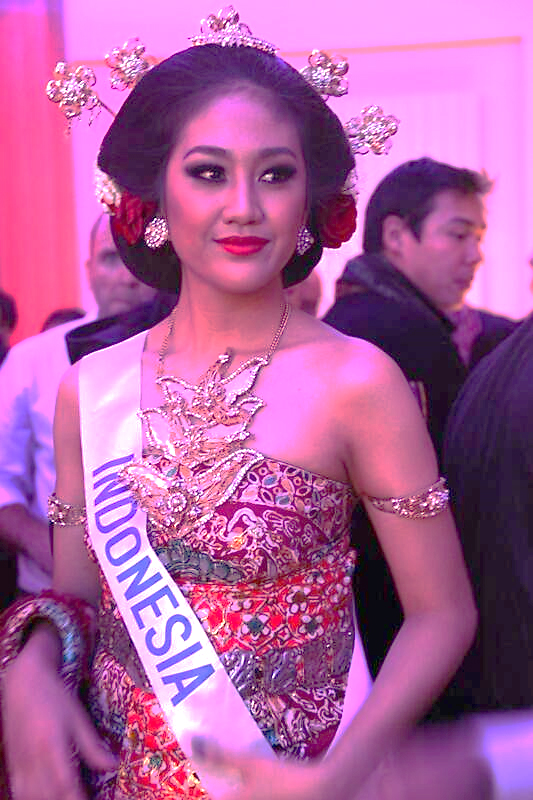
- Maladewi attending Investment Coordinating Board of The Republic of Indonesia event in 2014
- Born: Marisa Sartika Maladewi; 28 June 1993 (age 33); Yogyakarta, Indonesia
- Education: Sriwijaya University
- Occupations: Supermodel; Beauty pageant titleholder
- Height: 1.73 m (5 ft 8 in)
- Beauty pageant titleholder
- Title: Puteri Indonesia Lingkungan 2013; Miss International Indonesia 2013
- Major competitions: Puteri Indonesia 2013; (1st Runner-up – Puteri Indonesia Lingkungan); Miss International 2013; (Unplaced)

Marisa Sartika Maladewi (born 28 June 1993 in Yogyakarta) is an Indonesian model and beauty pageant titleholder who was crowned Puteri Indonesia Lingkungan 2013, She represented Indonesia at the Miss International 2013 beauty pageant and ended up winning the "Miss Beauty With Voice" and "Best National Costume" awards.

== Personal life ==
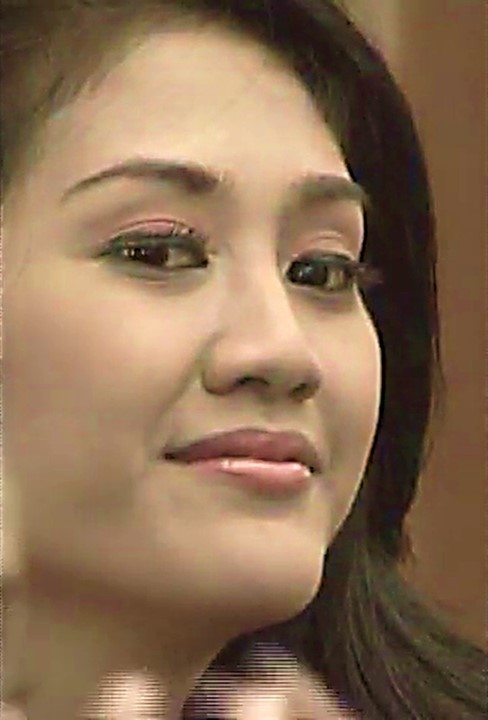
Marisa for The National Narcotics Board of The Republic of Indonesia event in 2013.

Marisa was born in Yogyakarta – Indonesia. In 2005, Marisa and her family moved and have resided in Palembang, South Sumatra. She holds a bachelor degree in Science in Agriculture from Sriwijaya University in Palembang - South Sumatra. She began her pageantry career when she was competing at Puteri Indonesia 2013 and won the title of Puteri Indonesia Lingkungan 2013.

== Pageantry ==
=== Puteri Indonesia 2013 ===
At 20 years old, Marisa competed against 39 delegates from across Indonesia in the Puteri Indonesia beauty pageant, as the representative of South Sumatra province. At the end of the competition, She won the title of Puteri Indonesia Lingkungan 2013, at the grand finale held in Jakarta Convention Center, Jakarta, Indonesia on February 1, by the outgoing titleholder of Puteri Indonesia Lingkungan 2011, Liza Elly Purnamasari of East Java.

=== Miss International 2013 ===
As Puteri Indonesia Lingkungan, Marisa represented Indonesia at the 53rd edition of Miss International 2013 pageant held in Tokyo Dome City Hall, Bunkyo, Tokyo, Japan. The finale was held on 17 December 2013, where she won the "Miss Beauty With Voice" and "Best National Costume" awards.

Awards and achievements
| Preceded by Atika Zulia Zaini | Puteri South Sumatra; 2012-2013 | Succeeded by Elfin Pertiwi Rappa |
| Preceded by East Java; Liza Elly Purnamasari | Puteri Indonesia Lingkungan; 2012-2013 | Succeeded by South Sumatra; Elfin Pertiwi Rappa |
