= Cok Istri Krisnanda Widani =

Indonesian Ministry of Tourism, National Narcotics Board, model and dancer

- Born: Cokorda Istri Krisnanda Widani; 27 March 1992 (age 34); Tabanan, Bali, Indonesia
- Education: Udayana University
- Occupations: Indonesian Ministry of Tourism and Creative Economy Ambassador; National Narcotics Board of the Republic of Indonesia Ambassador; Balinese dancer; model; Beauty pageant titleholders
- Height: 175 cm (5 ft 9 in)
- Beauty pageant titleholder
- Title: Puteri Indonesia Bali 2013; Puteri Indonesia Pariwisata 2013; Miss Supranational Indonesia 2013
- Hair color: Black
- Eye color: Black
- Major competitions: Puteri Indonesia Bali 2013; (Winner); Puteri Indonesia 2013; (2nd Runner-up – Puteri Indonesia Pariwisata); Miss Supranational 2013; (3rd Runner-up)

Cokorda Istri Krisnanda Widani (born 27 March 1992) is an Indonesian Ministry of Tourism and Creative Economy Ambassador, National Narcotics Board of the Republic of Indonesia Ambassador, Balinese dancer, model, beauty pageant titleholder who was crowned Puteri Indonesia Pariwisata 2013 and represented Indonesia for the first time at the Miss Supranational 2013 beauty pageant, where was the 3rd Runner-up.

== Personal life ==
Cok Istri was born and raised in Tabanan, Bali – Indonesia, to traditional Balinese parents, before she decided to move to Denpasar to work as a model, singer and traditional Balinese Pendet dancer and Janger dancer. She holds a bachelor degree in Accountancy studies from Udayana University, Denpasar, Bali - Indonesia. In 2013, she was chosen as the Indonesian Ministry of Tourism and Creative Economy Ambassador, for the Borobudur Writers and Cultural Festival by the Head of Minister of Tourism and Creative Economy of The Republic of Indonesia, Mari Elka Pangestu.

== Pageantry ==
=== Puteri Bali 2012 ===
Cok Istri stepping her foray into the field of pageantry by took part in Puteri Indonesia regional competition. Cok Istri representing her hometown Tabanan, she joined the contest at the provincial level of the Puteri Indonesia Bali 2012, and was chosen as the winner.

=== Puteri Indonesia 2012-2013 ===
Cok Istri competed in Puteri Indonesia 2013 as the representative of Bali. Competing against 39 delegates across Indonesia She won the title Puteri Indonesia Pariwisata 2013 at the grand finale held in Jakarta Convention Center, Jakarta, Indonesia on February 1, 2013, by the outgoing titleholder of Puteri Indonesia Pariwisata 2011 and Top 15 Miss Asia Pacific World 2012, Andi Tenri Gusti Harnum Utari Natassa of South Sulawesi.

=== Miss Supranational 2013 ===
In 2013, Puteri Indonesia Organization took the new license Miss Supranational and for first time ever, as the Puteri Indonesia Pariwisata 2013, Cok Istri represented Indonesia at the Miss Supranational 2013, held in Minsk, Belarus, where the finale was held on September 6, 2013. At the event, Cok Istri finished as the 3rd Runner-up.

During the finale competition, Cok Istri wore a Dayak inspired national costume named "Dayak Butterfly". Weighing 5 kg, the costume also features the Dayak Klebit Bok pattern and butterfly costume of Hudoq festival, designed by Solo Batik Carnival and Didit Hediprasetyo. By the end of the competition, Mutya Johanna Datul from the Philippines was crowned Miss Supranational 2013 by the outgoing titleholder Ekaterina Buraya of Belarus.

Awards and achievements
Preceded by Anak Agung Istri Karina Manik	Puteri Bali; 2012-2013	Succeeded by Made Ika Kusuma Dewi
Preceded by Andi Tenri Natassa (South Sulawesi)	Puteri Indonesia Pariwisata; 2012-2013	Succeeded by Lily Estelita Liana (SR Yogyakarta)
Preceded by Philippines – Elaine Kay Moll	Miss Supranational 3rd Runner-Up; 2013	Succeeded by USA – Allyn Rose
