= Remzi Kaplan =

Remzi Kaplan (born August 3, 1960, in Yozgat, Turkey) is a German-Turkish döner kebab producer in Berlin-Gesundbrunnen. He is a partner and managing director of Kaplan Dönerproduktion GmbH and, since June 2007, the chairman of the Turkish-German Business Association Berlin-Brandenburg. From 2006 to 2007, he was the chairman of the football club Türkiyemspor Berlin. Having immigrated to Germany as a child and later establishing a family-run enterprise, Kaplan expanded from operating snack bars to building one of the largest döner production networks in the EU, earning recognition in the Berlin press as the "King of Döner."

== Life ==
Kaplan grew up in the Anatolian village of Bahadın near Yozgat. His parents were caretakers, and Kaplan worked as a messenger and vegetable seller even as a schoolboy. His parents went to Germany as guest workers and brought their son, who had been living with his grandparents in the meantime, to join them in the early 1970s.

Kaplan married in 1977. His son and two daughters work for his company.

== Company ==
Initially, Kaplan ran snack bars in West Berlin. After the fall of the Berlin Wall, Kaplan expanded his kebab shops into East Berlin. In 1991, he and his brother opened their first meat processing plant. This was followed by production facilities in Zevenaar (1994), Hamburg (1996), Schönwalde (Wandlitz) (1999) and Berlin (2001). In July 2004, Kaplan opened a distribution center for döner kebab production in Szczecin with a Polish partner. By 2007, he was the largest döner kebab producer in the European Union. In Berlin alone, he supplies approximately 1,000 snack bars.

His company is represented on the board of the Association of Turkish Döner Kebab Producers in Europe (ATDID).

The Berlin press refers to Kaplan as the "King of Döner" or "Kebab King".
