= Puteri Indonesia 2014 =

- Date: January 29, 2014
- Presenters: Choky Sitohang, Rahma Landy, Zivanna Letisha, Maria Selena
- Entertainment: Afgan, Bunga Citra Lestari, Christopher Abimanyu, Judika, Lea Simanjuntak, NOAH
- Venue: Jakarta Convention Center, Jakarta, Indonesia
- Broadcaster: Indosiar
- Entrants: 38
- Placements: 10
- Winner: Elvira Devinamira; East Java

Puteri Indonesia 2014, the 18th Annual Puteri Indonesia beauty pageant, was held in Jakarta Convention Center, Jakarta, Indonesia on January 29, 2014. Thirty eight contestants from all 33 provinces of Indonesia competed for the title of Puteri Indonesia, one of the most prominent beauty pageant titles in the country.

Whulandary Herman, Puteri Indonesia 2013 from West Sumatra crowned Elvira Devinamira from East Java her successor at the end of the event. The winner represented Indonesia at the Miss Universe 2014, while the runners-up represented the nation at the Miss International 2014 and Miss Supranational 2014.

The winner of Miss Universe 2013 Gabriela Isler from Venezuela, was present during the event. The event was broadcast live on Indonesian television network, Indosiar.

== Results ==
The Crowns of Puteri Indonesia Title Holders

Puteri Indonesia 2014 (Miss Universe Indonesia 2014)
Puteri Indonesia Lingkungan 2014 (Miss International Indonesia 2014)
Puteri Indonesia Pariwisata 2014 (Miss Supranational Indonesia 2014)

Final Results	Contestant	International Placement
Puteri Indonesia 2014 (Miss Universe Indonesia)	East Java: Elvira Devinamira Wirayanti	Top 15 – Miss Universe 2014
Puteri Indonesia Lingkungan 2014 (Miss International Indonesia)	South Sumatra: Elfin Pertiwi Rappa	Top 10 – Miss International 2014
Puteri Indonesia Pariwisata 2014 (Miss Supranational Indonesia)	Yogyakarta Special Region: Lily Estelita Liana	Unplaced – Miss Supranational 2014
Top 5	Jakarta Special Capital Region 2 - Noor Zabilla Bambang Soeprapto; Central Java - Rakhmi Wijiharti	
Top 10	Gorontalo - Vensca Veronica Tanus; Jakarta Special Capital Region 5 - Dini Marlien Takola; Jambi - Fieka Soraya; Papua - Maria Fransisca Tambingon; West Sumatra - Raisa Adila Andomi	

== Contestants ==
Province	Delegate	Age	Height (cm)	Hometown
Aceh	Winda Ulfa	19	170 cm (5 ft 7 in)	Jantho
North Sumatra	Mega Tryanastasia Sembiring Meliala	21	170 cm (5 ft 7 in)	Karo
West Sumatra	Raisa Adila	21	174 cm (5 ft 8 1/2 in)	Lima Puluh Kota
Riau	Sharah Marsela	18	170 cm (5 ft 7 in)	Pekanbaru
Riau Islands	Tamini Endah Kartika Puri	23	168 cm (5 ft 6 in)	Tanjung Pinang
Jambi	Fieka Soraya	23	174 cm (5 ft 8 1/2 in)	East Tanjung Jabung
South Sumatra	Elfin Pertiwi Rappa	18	170 cm (5 ft 7 in)	Palembang
Bangka Belitung Islands	Verawati	21	171 cm (5 ft 7 1/2 in)	Muntok
Bengkulu	Amalia Rahayu Irdham	23	173 cm (5 ft 8 in)	Bengkulu
Lampung	Febri Parmawati Utami	19	171 cm (5 ft 7 1/2 in)	Pringsewu
Jakarta Special Capital Region 1	Andi Aisyah Shintadevi	23	170 cm (5 ft 7 in)	Jakarta
Jakarta Special Capital Region 2	Noor Zabilla Bambang Soeprapto	23	174 cm (5 ft 8 1/2 in)	Jakarta
Jakarta Special Capital Region 3	Melati Septidian Hutahaean	20	170 cm (5 ft 7 in)	Jakarta
Jakarta Special Capital Region 4	Ayeesha Thyziana Juanita Jielda Priandhini	21	173 cm (5 ft 8 in)	Jakarta
Jakarta Special Capital Region 5	Dini Marlien Takola	21	170 cm (5 ft 7 in)	Jakarta
Jakarta Special Capital Region 6	Sydney Amanda Ramandita	21	176 cm (5 ft 9 1/2 in)	Jakarta
Banten	Mutiarani	24	170 cm (5 ft 7 in)	Tangerang
West Java	Suci Nurhadhiah	19	173 cm (5 ft 8 in)	Cimahi
Central Java	Rakhmi Wijiharti	21	170 cm (5 ft 7 in)	Purwokerto
Yogyakarta Special Region	Lily Estelita Liana	20	169 cm (5 ft 6 1/2 in)	Sleman
East Java	Elvira Devinamira Wirayanti	21	175 cm (5 ft 9 in)	Surabaya
Bali	Made Ika Kusuma Dewi	20	174 cm (5 ft 8 1/2 in)	Gianyar
West Nusa Tenggara	Nindy Rachma Putri	22	170 cm (5 ft 7 in)	Dompu
East Nusa Tenggara	Dyathra Silvana Baten	20	173 cm (5 ft 8 in)	Belu
West Kalimantan	Rizka Afriandhita Edmanda	20	171 cm (5 ft 7 1/2 in)	Kubu Raya
South Kalimantan	Adetya Norizkyka	20	170 cm (5 ft 7 in)	Banjarmasin
Central Kalimantan	Sriana Sihombing	21	167 cm (5 ft 5 1/2 in)	Kuala Kapuas
East Kalimantan	Bebie Ayura	19	170 cm (5 ft 7 in)	Balikpapan
Southeast Sulawesi	Ayu Puspa Ningtyas	23	172 cm (5 ft 7 1/2 in)	Baubau
West Sulawesi	Melina Dewi Lukman	20	170 cm (5 ft 7 in)	Mamuju
South Sulawesi	Dessy Ratnasari Syarief	22	177 cm (5 ft 9 1/2 in)	Parepare
Central Sulawesi	Lisa Marina Putri Tohoro	20	169 cm (5 ft 6 1/2 in)	Sigi
North Sulawesi	Maria Rizky Chrisliany	23	172 cm (5 ft 7 1/2 in)	Manado
Gorontalo	Vensca Veronica Tanus	18	170 cm (5 ft 7 in)	Gorontalo
Maluku	Carissa Trixie Lewakabessy	21	170 cm (5 ft 7 in)	Ambon
North Maluku	Claudia Arfianna Djafaar	20	168 cm (5 ft 6 in)	Ternate
Papua	Maria Fransisca Tambingon	18	170 cm (5 ft 7 in)	Biak Numfor
West Papua	Eklevina Aprilia Rumpampono	20	167 cm (5 ft 5 1/2 in)	Kaimana
