= Puteri Indonesia 2013 =

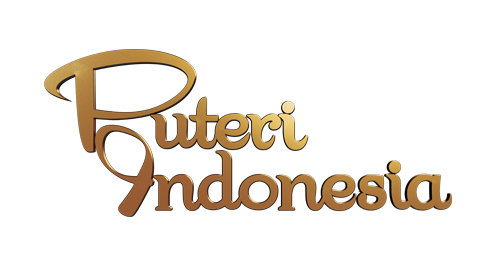
- Date: February 1, 2013
- Presenters: Choky Sitohang; Rahma Landy; Nadia Mulya; Zivanna Letisha
- Entertainment: Andien; Marcell Siahaan; Daniel Christianto; Christopher Abimanyu; S4
- Venue: Jakarta Convention Center, Jakarta, Indonesia
- Broadcaster: Indosiar
- Entrants: 38
- Placements: 10
- Winner: Whulandary Herman; West Sumatra

Puteri Indonesia 2012-2013, the 17th Annual Puteri Indonesia beauty pageant, was held in Jakarta Convention Center, Jakarta, Indonesia on February 1, 2013.

Previous edition of Puteri Indonesia was held in October 2011 and the next edition was supposed to be held on 2012, but because Miss Universe 2012 was held in December 2012 the organization decided to reschedule the event to February 2013. Thirty eight contestants from all 33 provinces of Indonesia competed for the title of Puteri Indonesia, one of the most prominent beauty pageant titles in the country.

Maria Selena, Puteri Indonesia 2011 from Central Java crowned her successor Whulandary Herman from West Sumatra at the end of this event. The winner is going to represent Indonesia at the Miss Universe 2013, while the runners-up will represent the nation at the Miss International 2013, Miss Supranational 2013 and Miss Grand International 2013. The event was broadcast live on Indonesian television network, Indosiar. The winner of Miss Universe 2012 Olivia Culpo from USA, was present during the event.

== Result ==
The Crowns of Puteri Indonesia Title Holders

Puteri Indonesia 2013 (Miss Universe Indonesia 2013)
Puteri Indonesia Lingkungan 2013 (Miss International Indonesia 2013)
Puteri Indonesia Pariwisata 2013 (Miss Supranational Indonesia 2013)
Puteri Indonesia Perdamaian (Miss Grand Indonesia 2013)

| Final Results | Contestant | International Placement |
|---|---|---|
| Puteri Indonesia 2013 (Miss Universe Indonesia) | West Sumatra: Whulandary Herman | Top 16 – Miss Universe 2013 |
| Puteri Indonesia Lingkungan 2013 (Miss International Indonesia) | South Sumatra: Marisa Sartika Maladewi | Unplaced – Miss International 2013 |
| Puteri Indonesia Pariwisata 2013 (Miss Supranational Indonesia) | Bali: Cok Istri Krisnanda Widani | 3rd Runner-up – Miss Supranational 2013 |
| 3rd Runner-up (Miss Grand Indonesia) | North Sulawesi: Novia Indriani Mamuaja | Unplaced – Miss Grand International 2013 |
| 4th Runner-up | Jakarta Special Capital Region 3 – Nadia Ingrida Gani | |
| Top 10 Semi-Finalist | Bengkulu – Friska Juliana Agustius; Jakarta Special Capital Region 5 – Rr. Aubry Widdy Asteria Beer; East Nusa Tenggara – Clarasati Ayu Suhanda; West Java– Ryan Putri Astrini Basyarah; West Kalimantan – Ayu Ravianti | |

== Contestants ==
| Province | Delegate | Age | Height (cm) | Hometown |
|---|---|---|---|---|
| Aceh | Sylvia Rosa | 23 | 165 cm (5 ft 5 in) | Lhokseumawe |
| North Sumatra | Eva Septriani Sianipar | 24 | 175 cm (5 ft 9 in) | Medan |
| West Sumatra | Whulandary Herman | 25 | 176 cm (5 ft 9 1/2 in) | Pariaman |
| Riau | Surayya Ardillah | 20 | 173 cm (5 ft 8 in) | Bangkinang |
| Riau Islands | Dwiartha Kamandhany Putri | 23 | 173 cm (5 ft 8 in) | Batam |
| Jambi | Amelia Siregar | 22 | 171 cm (5 ft 7 1/2 in) | Sarolangun |
| South Sumatra | Marisa Sartika Maladewi | 20 | 170 cm (5 ft 7 in) | Muara Enim |
| Bangka Belitung Islands | Gina Virginia Rachmadana | 22 | 172 cm (5 ft 7 1/2 in) | Pangkal Pinang |
| Bengkulu | Friska Juliana Agustius | 22 | 167 cm (5 ft 5 1/2 in) | Kepahiang |
| Lampung | Sisca Indah Pratiwi | 21 | 171 cm (5 ft 7 1/2 in) | Bandar Lampung |
| Jakarta Special Capital Region 1 | Nazilah Abdullah | 23 | 175 cm (5 ft 9 in) | Jakarta |
| Jakarta Special Capital Region 2 | Kartika Berliana Tjakradidjaja | 21 | 172 cm (5 ft 7 1/2 in) | Jakarta |
| Jakarta Special Capital Region 3 | Nadia Ingrida Gani | 23 | 170 cm (5 ft 7 in) | Jakarta |
| Jakarta Special Capital Region 4 | Karina Febriani | 19 | 173 cm (5 ft 8 in) | Jakarta |
| Jakarta Special Capital Region 5 | Rr. Aubry Widdy Asteria Beer | 22 | 171.5 cm (5 ft 7 1/2 in) | Jakarta |
| Jakarta Special Capital Region 6 | Nila Veronica Edward | 24 | 176 cm (5 ft 9 1/2 in) | Jakarta |
| Banten | Della Erawati Dartyan | 23 | 171 cm (5 ft 7 1/2 in) | South Tangerang |
| West Java | Ryan Putri Astrini Basyarah | 22 | 171 cm (5 ft 7 1/2 in) | Cianjur |
| Central Java | Rachel Georghea Sentani | 20 | 172.5 cm (5 ft 8 in) | Surakarta |
| Yogyakarta Special Region | Florentia Anindita Apsari Isthika | 20 | 170 cm (5 ft 7 in) | Yogyakarta |
| East Java | Asri Nofalya Kamalin | 21 | 167 cm (5 ft 5 1/2 in) | Pasuruan |
| Bali | Cok Istri Krisnanda Widani | 20 | 172 cm (5 ft 7 1/2 in) | Tabanan |
| West Nusa Tenggara | Baiq Merrystha Yonnanda | 20 | 173 cm (5 ft 8 in) | Praya |
| East Nusa Tenggara | Clarasati Ayu Suhanda | 20 | 171 cm (5 ft 7 1/2 in) | Kupang |
| West Kalimantan | Ayu Ravianti | 20 | 169 cm (5 ft 6 1/2 in) | Pontianak |
| South Kalimantan | Dewi Chandrawati | 25 | 170 cm (5 ft 7 in) | Banjarmasin |
| Central Kalimantan | Widayati Silva Ningrum | 18 | 168 cm (5 ft 6 in) | Palangka Raya |
| East Kalimantan | Monalisa Pertiwi Siregar | 25 | 169 cm (5 ft 6 1/2 in) | Balikpapan |
| Southeast Sulawesi | Endang Mahari | 23 | 172 cm (5 ft 7 1/2 in) | Unaaha |
| West Sulawesi | Fenny Santhi Karoma | 20 | 172 cm (5 ft 7 1/2 in) | Mamasa |
| South Sulawesi | Ayu Wahyuni Monalisa Paturusi | 20 | 171 cm (5 ft 7 1/2 in) | Pinrang |
| Central Sulawesi | Rani Oktaviana Pangemanan | 20 | 175 cm (5 ft 9 in) | Palu |
| North Sulawesi | Novia Indriani Mamuaja | 18 | 170 cm (5 ft 7 in) | Manado |
| Gorontalo | Sheyla Drajat Prihastuti Muhammad | 24 | 169 cm (5 ft 6 1/2 in) | Gorontalo |
| Maluku | Elsa Maureen Sihasale | 23 | 168 cm (5 ft 6 in) | Ambon |
| North Maluku | Ria Sanjani Daeng Barang | 20 | 168 cm (5 ft 6 in) | Ternate |
| Papua | Cezia Greatia Pesurnay | 22 | 170 cm (5 ft 7 in) | Mimika |
| West Papua | Kezia Elvina Wabiser | 24 | 165 cm (5 ft 5 in) | Sorong |
