= Kezia Warouw =

Indonesian National Narcotics Board, TV presenter, model and Miss Universe Indonesia 2016

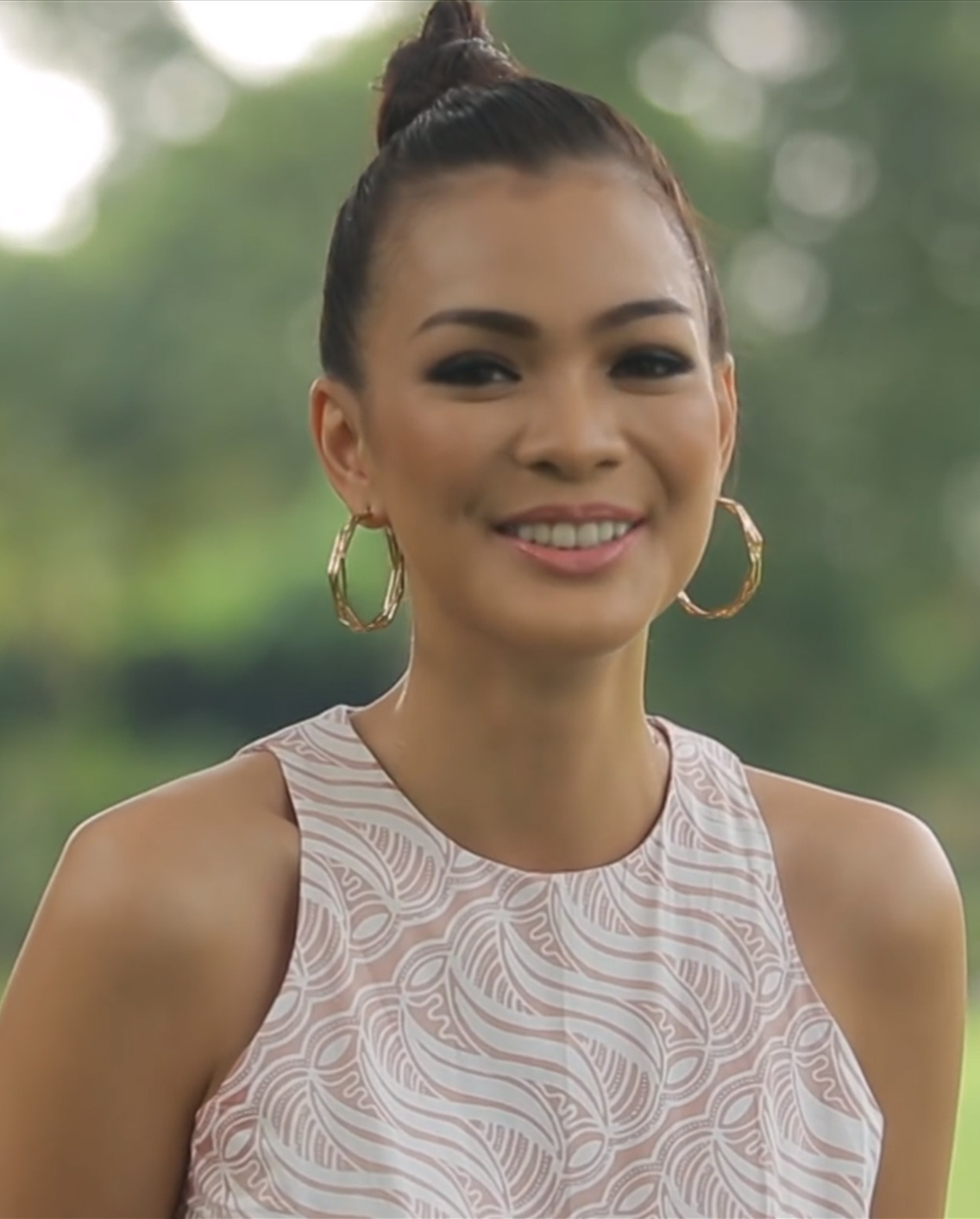
- Miss Universe Indonesia 2016, Kezia Roslin Cikita Warouw at NET TV
- Born: Kezia Roslin Cikita Warouw; 18 April 1991 (age 35); Manado, North Sulawesi - Indonesia
- Education: Esa Unggul University
- Occupations: National Narcotics Board of the Republic of Indonesia Ambassador, Actress, TV presenter, model
- Height: 6 ft 0 in (1.83 m)
- Spouse: Christian Rante Padang (m. 2018)
- Children: Kylie Dyke Rantepadang
- Beauty pageant titleholder
- Title: Puteri Indonesia Sulawesi Utara 2016; Puteri Indonesia 2016; Miss Universe Indonesia 2016
- Hair color: Black
- Eye color: Black
- Major competitions: Puteri Sulawesi Utara 2016; (Winner); Puteri Indonesia 2016; (Winner); Miss Universe 2016; (Top 13)

Kezia Roslin Cikita Warouw (born 18 April 1991) is an Indonesian National Narcotics Board ambassador, TV presenter, model and beauty pageant titleholder who won Puteri Indonesia 2016. She represented Indonesia at the Miss Universe 2016 pageant, and earn Top 13 placement, the second highest placement by any Indonesian representative. She also won sponsor award "Miss Phoenix Smile" and placed as a Top 10 in Best in National Costume competition at Miss Universe 2016. She is the fifth Indonesian and the first Minahasan to be a Miss Universe Finalist.

== Personal life, career and education ==
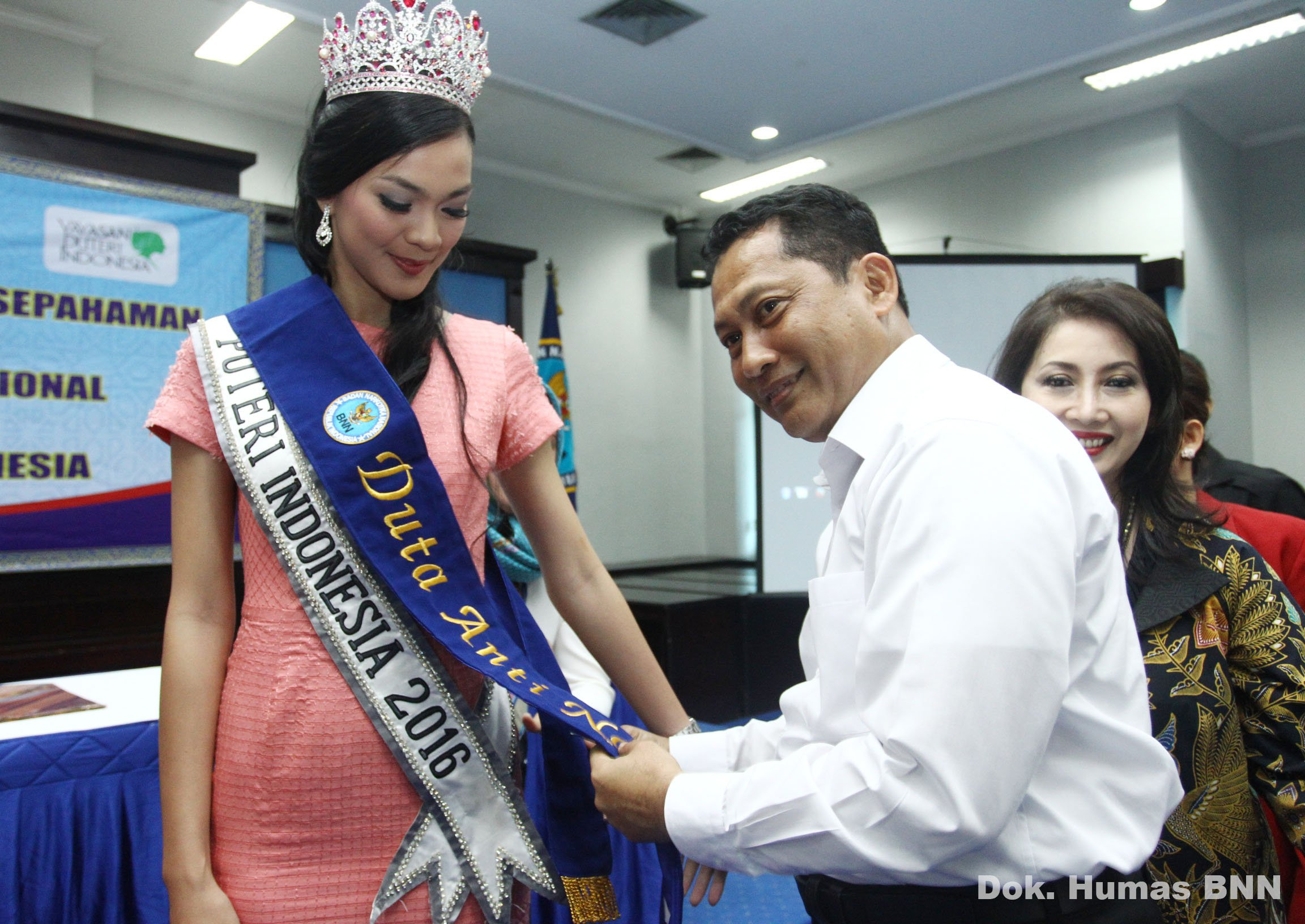
Kezia chosen as The Ambassador of National Narcotics Board of the Republic of Indonesia by Budi Waseso on 16 May 2016.

Kezia was born and grew up in North Sulawesi, with a Minahasan tribe descent. She started in a contest as Noni North Sulawesi and Puteri Indonesia North Sulawesi 2016. She graduated from the Esa Unggul University with a degree in engineering informatics. Kezia worked as a bank officer. She also made her own android application in order to promote eco-tourism in Indonesia. On 16 May 2016, Kezia was chosen as The Ambassador of National Narcotics Board of the Republic of Indonesia by head of National Narcotics Board of the Republic of Indonesia, Budi Waseso.

On 2 September 2018, Kezia Warouw married Indonesian National Police Officer Christian Rante Padang, to whom she had been engaged since 1 September 2017. On 24 November 2020, she gave birth to a daughter, Kylie Dyke Rantepadang in Manado, North Sulawesi.

== Pageantry ==
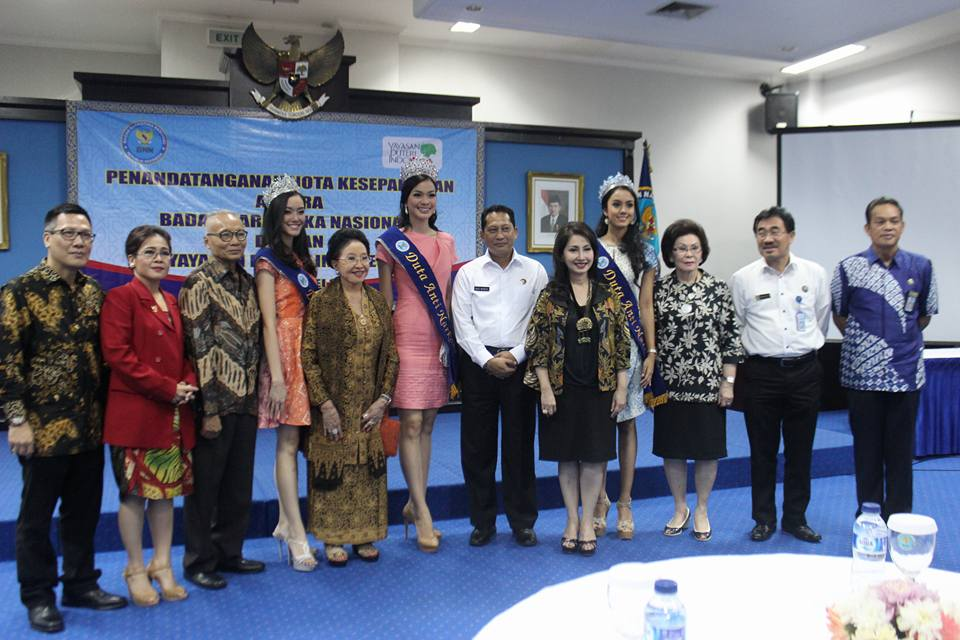
Kezia on duties as The Ambassador of National Narcotics Board of the Republic of Indonesia doing drugs destruction session on 30 June 2016.

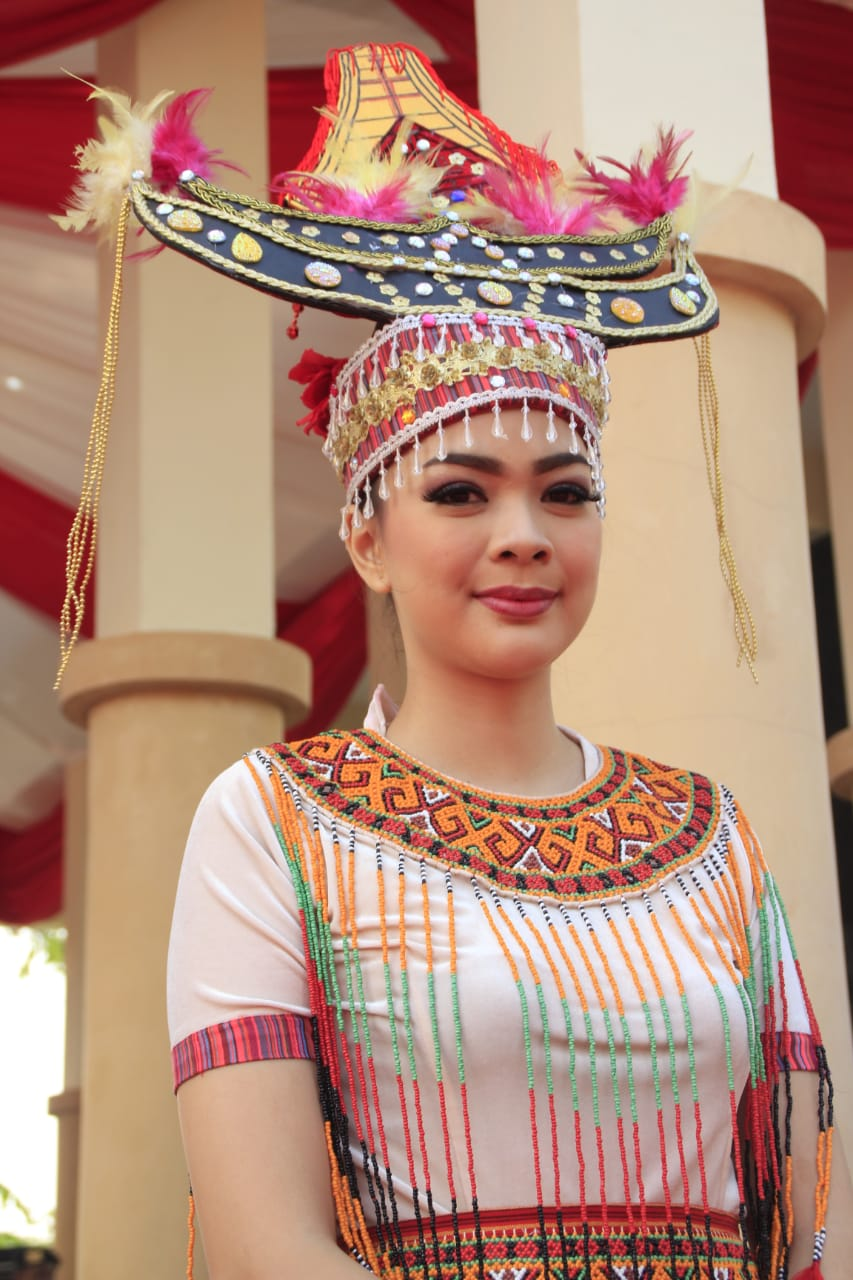
Kezia for 2018 Asian Games torch relay together with Ministry of Youth and Sport of Republic of Indonesia-Imam Nahrawi on 18 July 2018.

=== Puteri Indonesia 2016 ===
On 19 February 2016, Kezia represented the North Sulawesi province at Puteri Indonesia 2016. Kezia was crowned Puteri Indonesia 2016 at the finals held at the Jakarta Convention Center, Jakarta, by the outgoing predecessor of Puteri Indonesia 2015 and Top 15 Miss Universe 2015 Anindya Kusuma Putri of Central Java.

Kezia was the second woman from North Sulawesi to be selected as the winner of the Puteri Indonesia, after Angelina Sondakh in 2001. As Puteri Indonesia 2016 she began volunteering for Smile Train Indonesia.

Kezia crowned together with another Puteri Indonesia 2016 Queens; Puteri Indonesia Lingkungan; Felicia Hwang Yi Xin of Lampung, Puteri Indonesia Pariwisata; Intan Aletrinö of West Sumatra and Puteri Indonesia Perdamaian; Ariska Putri Pertiwi of North Sumatra.

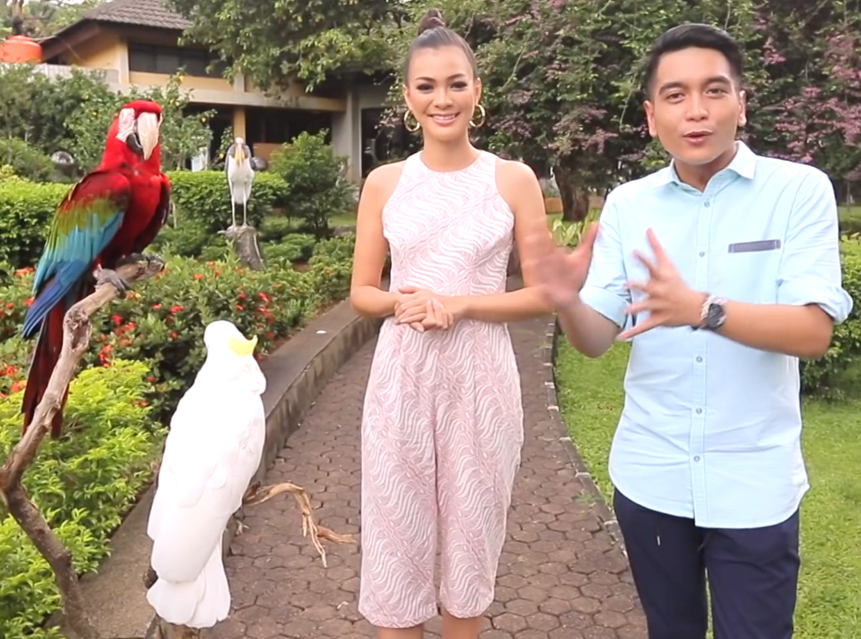
Kezia Roslin Cikita Warouw on Promo Satu Indonesia talkshow, NET TV on 8 March 2017.

=== Miss Universe 2016 ===
Kezia represented Indonesia at Miss Universe 2016 at the Mall of Asia Arena, in Pasay, Metro Manila, Philippines on 30 January 2017. where she continued Indonesia's stake in the Miss Universe pageant by placing in the semifinals for a fourth consecutive time finishing as a "Top 13 finalist" and become one of the Top 10 in Best National Costume with Golden Garuda Pancasila National Costume designed by Jember Fashion Carnaval.

She also wore evening gown designed by Ivan Gunawan. During pre-pageant activities Kezia was a catwalk model for Mindanao Tapestry: The Neo-Ethnic Fashion of Renee Salud and the Mindanao Weavers (T'nalak), held in SM City Davao. During Mindanao Tapestry: The Neo-Ethnic Fashion week, Kezia won "Miss Phoenix Smile" by local sponsor Phoenix Petroleum.

== Filmography ==
Kezia has presented on several variety talk shows.

=== Talk show ===
Year	Title	Genre	Role	Film Production	Ref.
2017–present	Selebrita	talk show	as Herself	Trans7	
2019–present	Ini Baru Empat Mata	talk show	as Herself	Trans7	

== See also ==
- Miss Universe 2016
- Puteri Indonesia 2016
- Felicia Hwang Yi Xin
- Intan Aletrinö

Awards and achievements
Preceded by Gresya Amanda Maaliwuga	Puteri North Sulawesi; 2016	Succeeded by Luana Jennisa Kenap
Preceded by Central Java – Anindya Kusuma Putri	Puteri Indonesia; 2016	Succeeded by Jakarta SCR 5 – Bunga Jelitha
