= Melvin Giovanie =

Indonesian actor

- Born: Melvin Giovanie Lim; 23 May 1986 (age 39); Jakarta, Indonesia
- Occupation: Actor
- Years active: 2007–present
- Website: melvingiovanie.com

Melvin Giovanie Lim (born 23 May 1986) is an Indonesian actor. He began his career starring in the Indonesian horror film "Lawang Sewu: Kuntilanak's Vengeance".

== Career ==
Giovanie began his movie career in 2007 by starring in the horror film "Lawang Sewu: Kuntilanak's Vengeance" produced by MD Pictures. In 2008, he has also starred in the horror film "The Ghost Train of Manggarai" directed by Nayato Fio Nuala, and the comedy film "Vote for Love" alongside Nadia Saphira and Jessica Iskandar where he played as Anto, a campus journalist with annoying nature. Other than big screen movies, Giovanie has also played many roles in television film (TV Movie) and appeared as a model in the music videos of favorite Indonesian and Malaysian bands and singers, such as D'Masiv, Anuar Zain, and many other.

== Filmography ==
=== Film ===
Year	Title	Role	Notes
2007	Lawang Sewu: Dendam Kuntilanak (Lawang Sewu: Kuntilanak's Vengeance)	Armen	
2008	Kereta Hantu Manggarai (The Ghost Train of Manggarai)	Bobby	
2008	Coblos Cinta (Vote for Love)	Anto	

=== Television film ===
Year	Title	Role	Notes
2007	Miss Pompom		
2008	Dua Dara Jatuh Cinta (Two Girls in Love)		
2008	Ustaz Jaka	Dimas	
2008	Lebaran Dong masa Lebaran Lah		
2009	Misteri Arwah Kali Angke (Angke River Ghost Mistery)	Enggar	

=== Short film ===
Year	Title	Role	Notes
2020	Anak Ambar (The Ambar Child)	Ferry	Also producer, director, and editor

== Music video ==
=== Music video appearances ===
Year	Song	Artist
2007	"Tak Bisa Hidup Tanpamu" ("Can't Live Without You")	D'Masiv
2007	"Ilham Dimatamu" ("Inspiration in Your Eyes")	Mila Jirin
2007	"Lelaki Ini" ("This Man")	Anuar Zain
2008	"Menyesal" ("Regret")	Ressa Herlambang
2008	"Mencintaiku" ("Loving Me")	Magneto
2008	"Perih" ("Poignant")	Vierratale
2008	"Pura-Pura" ("Pretending")	Faby Marcelia
2009	"Siapakah Dirimu" ("Who Are You")	Lobow

== Advertisement ==
=== TV ads ===
Year	Product	Note
2009	Tebs	Basketball Version
