= Bunga Jelitha =

Indonesian actress, model, Miss Universe Indonesia 2017 and Puteri Indonesia 2017,

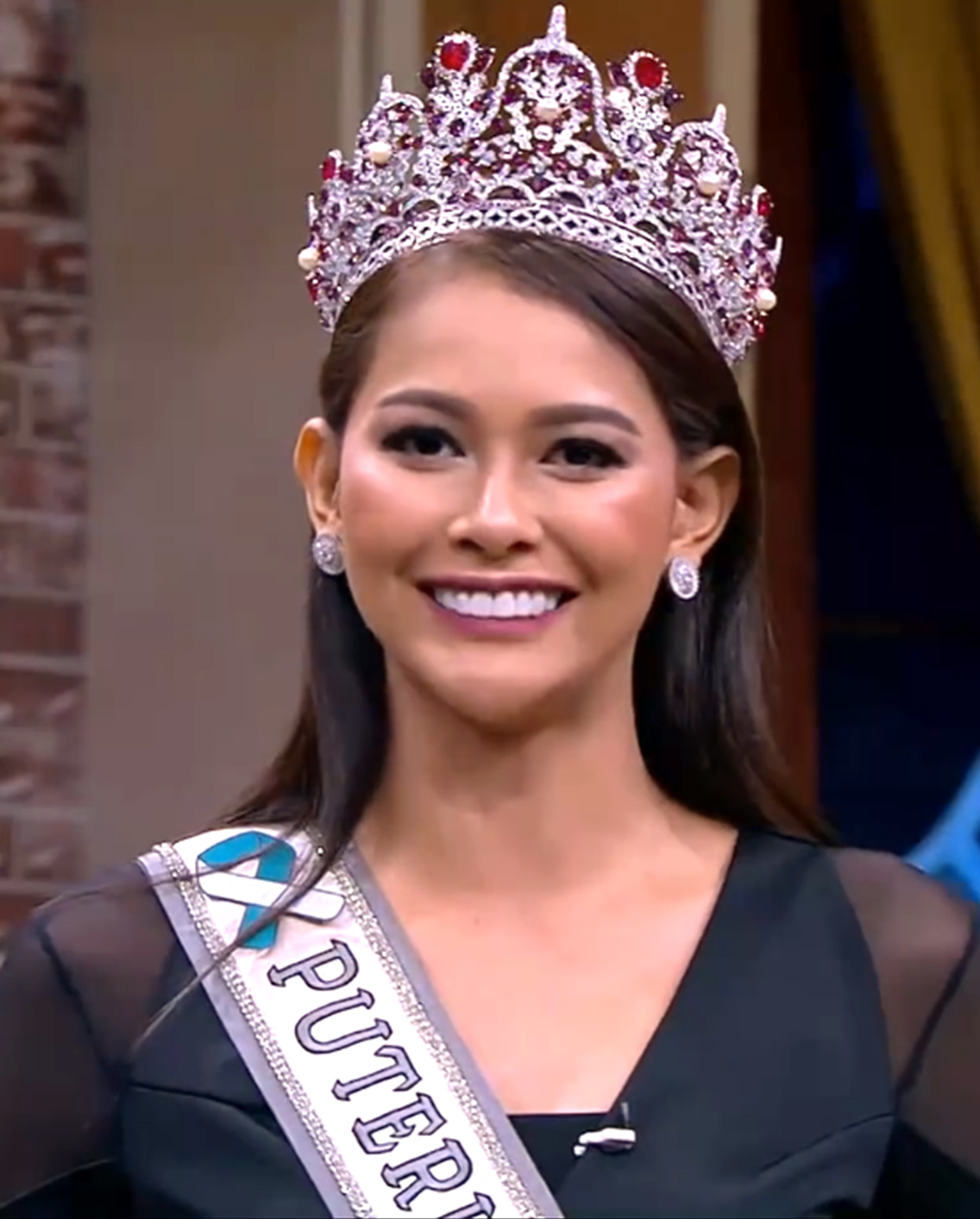
- Miss Universe Indonesia 2017, Bunga Jelitha Ibrani at NET TV
- Born: Bunga Jelitha Ibrani; 6 September 1991 (age 35); Jakarta, Indonesia
- Education: Esa Unggul University, Jakarta
- Occupations: Actress, Model, TV Host
- Height: 1.80 m (5 ft 11 in)
- Spouse: Syamsir Alam (m. 2020)
- Children: 2
- Beauty pageant titleholder
- Title: Supermodel International 2011; Guess Girl South East Asia 2015; Puteri Indonesia 2017; Miss Universe Indonesia 2017
- Years active: 2005–present
- Hair color: Black
- Eye color: Brown
- Major competitions: Supermodel International 2011; (Winner); Guess Girl Southeast Asia 2015; (Winner); Puteri Indonesia 2017; (Winner); Miss Universe 2017; (Unplaced)

Bunga Jelitha Ibrani (born 6 September 1991) is an Indonesian actress, model and beauty pageant titleholder who won Supermodel International 2011 and also Puteri Indonesia 2017. She represented Indonesia at the Miss Universe 2017, where she didn't make into the Top 16, but she won "Miss Photogenic" award.

== Personal life and career ==
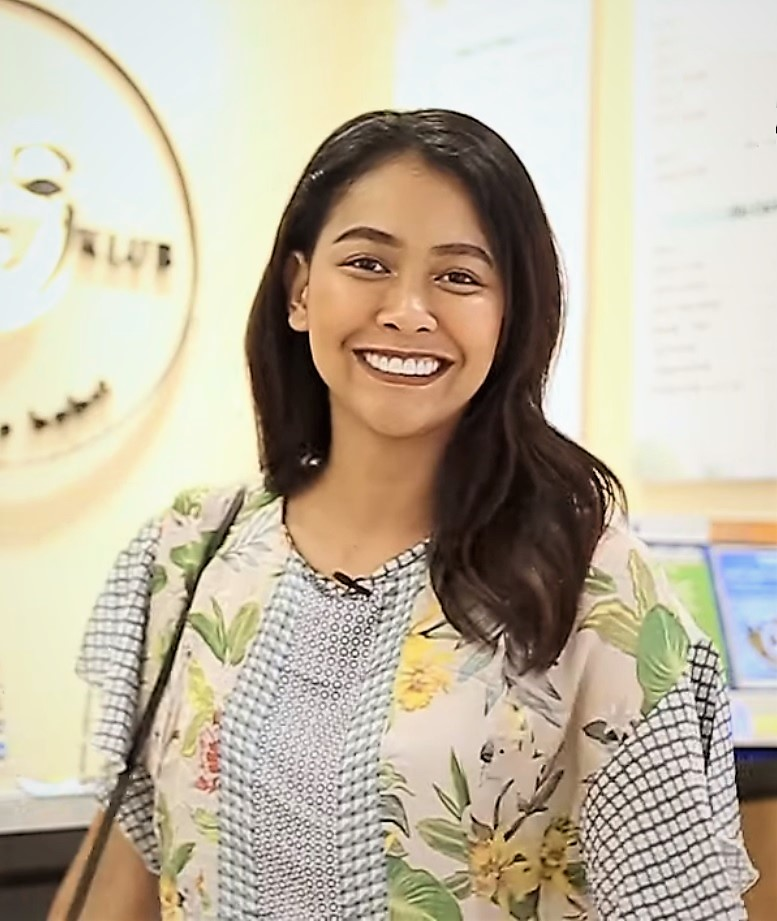
Jelitha appearing for Face Klub Super Rejuve in 2019

Bunga Jelitha Ibrani, who stands 180 cm tall, is a model from Indonesia, now managed by Jakarta International Management (JIM Models). Her career began when she became a Finalist of Gadis Sampul 2005, but she has not made it out as a winner. In the same year, Bunga succeeded in winning Gading Model Search, and her career continued as she entered the Supermodel of Asia Pacific 2011 (now Supermodel International), and succeeded as the first winner at the time, in Bangkok, Thailand.

In 2012, Bunga tries her luck at the Puteri Indonesia 2013 contest which auditioned for Jakarta province, but has not produced results.

In 2015, Bunga pursued Guess Girl Model Search Indonesia 2015 audition, and was selected as a representative of Indonesia. Together with three other finalists, Bunga competed in Guess Girl Model Search SouthEast Asia 2015, and made it out as winner.

On 18 July 2018, President of Indonesia Joko Widodo, appointed Bunga to be an East Nusa Tenggara dancer, wearing traditional East Nusa Tenggara dress, for the opening ceremony of 2018 Asian Games torch relay in Grobogan Regency, Central Java.

On 21 March 2020, Bunga married Syamsir Alam, an Indonesian professional footballer who plays as a forward for Liga 2 club RANS Cilegon. On 6 January 2021, she gave birth to a daughter.

== Beauty Pageant ==
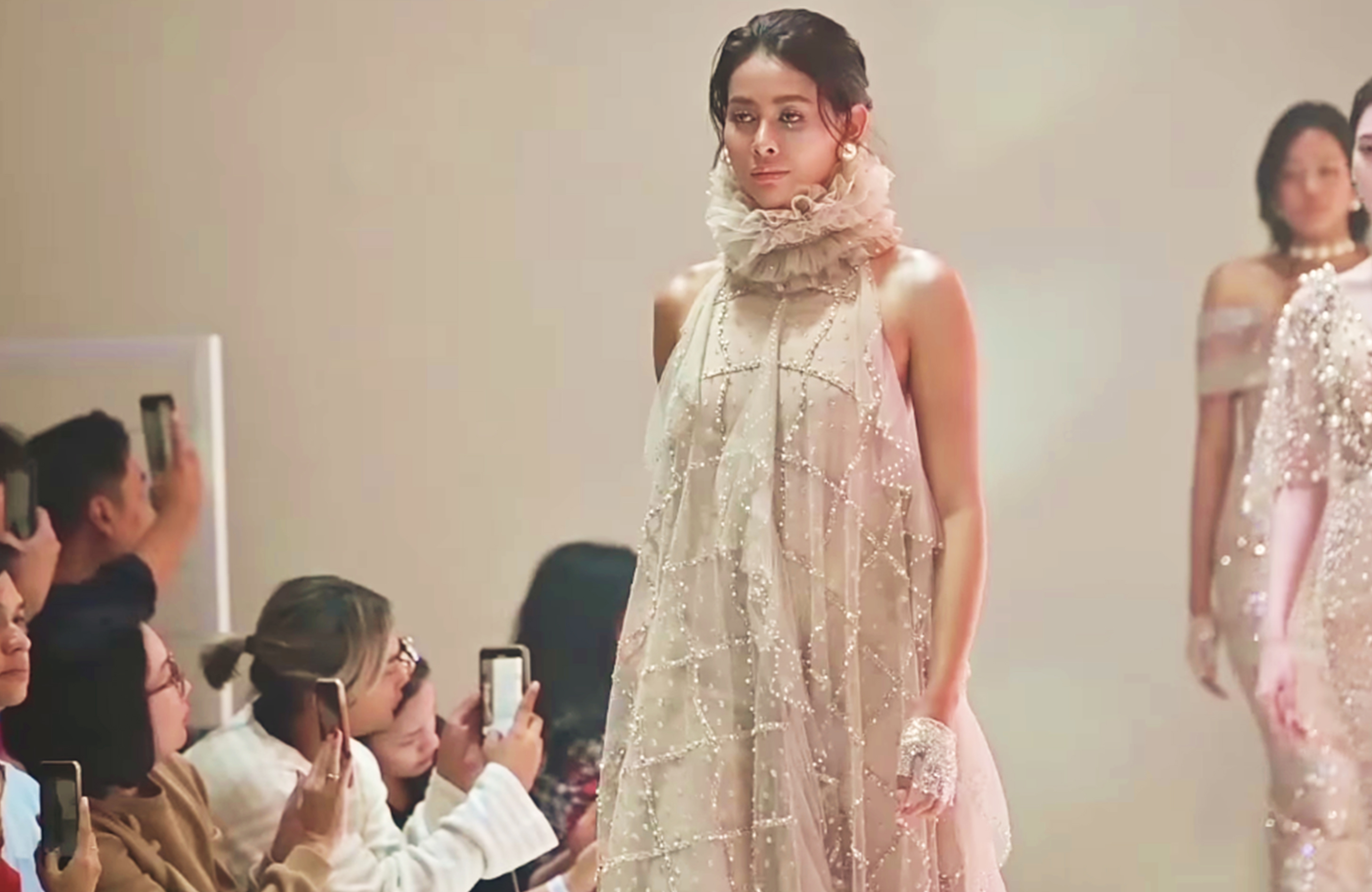
Jelitha at Ivan Gunawan Fashion Show in Jakarta Fashion Week 2019.

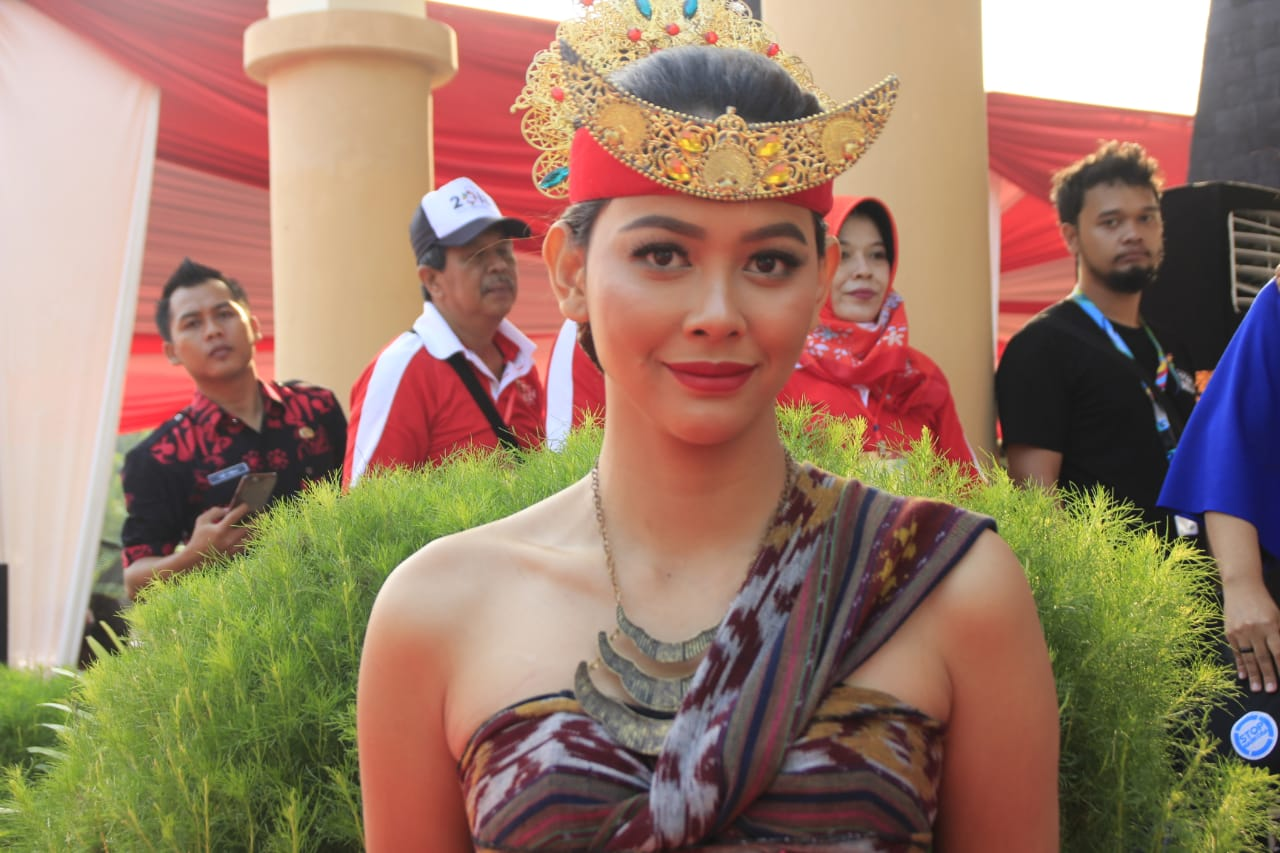
Jelitha wearing traditional East Nusa Tenggara dress, during 2018 Asian Games torch relay on 18 July 2018.

=== Puteri Indonesia 2017 ===
In 2017, Bunga tried her luck back at the Puteri Indonesia 2017 contest and was chosen to represent Special Capital Region of Jakarta.

On March 31, 2017, she was crowned Puteri Indonesia 2017 at the Jakarta Convention Center by outgoing title-holder Puteri Indonesia 2016 and Top 13 Miss Universe 2016, Kezia Roslin Cikita Warouw of North Sulawesi.

According to Bunga, pursuing Puteri Indonesia was her childhood dream, but she hesitated because she only finished high school, and she has learned outside of formal education since becoming Puteri Indonesia.

=== Miss Universe 2017 ===
Bunga represented Indonesia at Miss Universe 2017, was held on 26 November 2017 at The AXIS at Planet Hollywood in Las Vegas, Nevada, United States. She is one of the favorites at Miss Universe 2017, but failed to place in the semifinals. Bunga ended Indonesia's four year streak of consecutive placements at Miss Universe, from 2013 through 2016, but won the miss photogenic award.

== Filmography ==
Bunga has appeared on several cinema film.

=== Films ===
Year	Title	Role
2007	Lawang Sewu	Chika
2020	Serigala Langit	Tami "Rajawali"

Awards and achievements
Preceded by New Title	Supermodel International; 2011	Succeeded by South Africa – Reabetswe Sechoaro
Preceded by Kurnia Anggrayani	Puteri Jakarta SCR 5; 2017	Succeeded by Agnes Tifani
Preceded by North Sulawesi – Kezia Warouw	Puteri Indonesia; 2017	Succeeded by Bangka Belitung – Sonia Fergina Citra
