= Intan Aletrino =

TV Presenter, actress and Miss Supranational Indonesia 2016

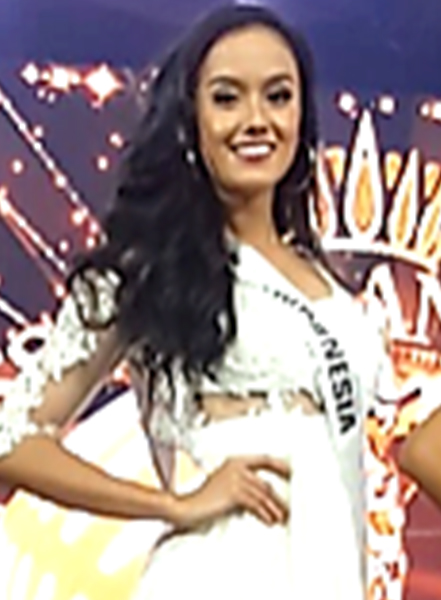
- Puteri Indonesia Pariwisata 2016 Aletrinö on 12 December 2016.
- Born: Intan Aletrino; 30 June 1993 (age 33); Venlo, Limburg, Netherlands
- Education: Andalas University; Utrecht University
- Occupations: National Narcotics Board of the Republic of Indonesia Ambassador; Actress; TV presenter; Model; Beauty pageant titleholders
- Height: 175 cm (5 ft 9 in)
- Spouse: Ian Syarief Kleimer (m. 2020)
- Children: Izra Rayyan Kleimer
- Beauty pageant titleholder
- Title: Puteri Indonesia Pariwisata 2016; Miss Supranational Indonesia 2016
- Hair color: Dark brown
- Eye color: Dark brown
- Major competitions: Puteri Indonesia 2016; (2nd Runner-up – Puteri Indonesia Pariwisata 2016); Miss Supranational 2016; (Top 10)

Intan Aletrino (born 30 June 1993) is an Indonesian actress, TV host, supermodel and beauty pageant titleholder who is National Narcotics Board of the Republic of Indonesia Ambassador. She won the title of Puteri Indonesia Pariwisata 2016. She represented Indonesia at the Miss Supranational 2016 pageant in Krynica-Zdrój, Poland, where she placed in the top 10, also won Miss Elegance and Miss Multimedia Awards.

== Early life and education ==
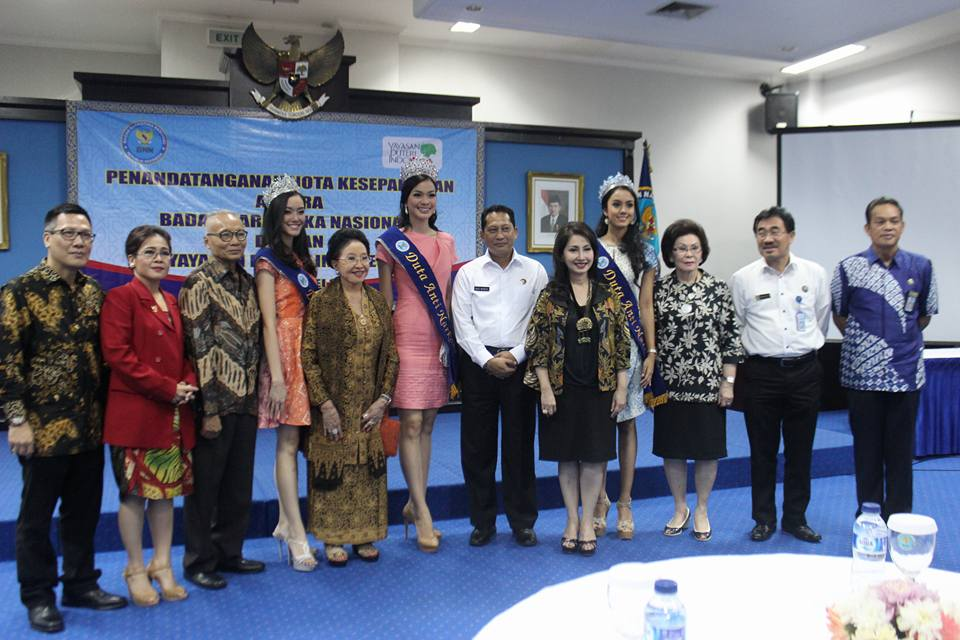
Intan (4th from right) chosen as The Ambassador of National Narcotics Board of the Republic of Indonesia by Budi Waseso on 16 May 2016.

Intan was born in Venlo, Limburg, Netherlands to a Dutch father, Ricardo Andre Aletrino and Minangkabau mother, Emirita. She fluently speaks four languages: Bahasa Indonesia, English, German, and Dutch. She holds a magister degree in Doctor of Law from Faculty of Law of Andalas University, Padang – West Sumatra and was an exchange student to Utrecht University, Netherlands.

On 16 May 2016, Intan together with Puteri Indonesia - Kezia Roslin Cikita Warouw and Puteri Indonesia Lingkungan - Felicia Hwang Yi Xin was chosen as the Ambassador of National Narcotics Board of the Republic of Indonesia by head of National Narcotics Board of the Republic of Indonesia, Budi Waseso. On 2 February 2020, Intan Aletrinö married Minangkabauan-Dutch businessman, Ian Syarief Kleimer. Intan and Ian had previously been engaged on 1 December 2018. On 22 December 2020, she gave birth to her only son, Izra Rayyan Kleimer in Jakarta, Indonesia.

== Pageantry ==
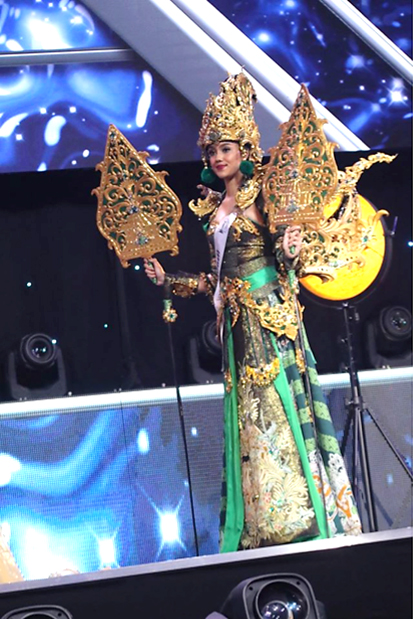
Intan brought a national costume with the Wayang Golek-inspired ensemble at Miss Supranational 2016 on 12 December 2016.

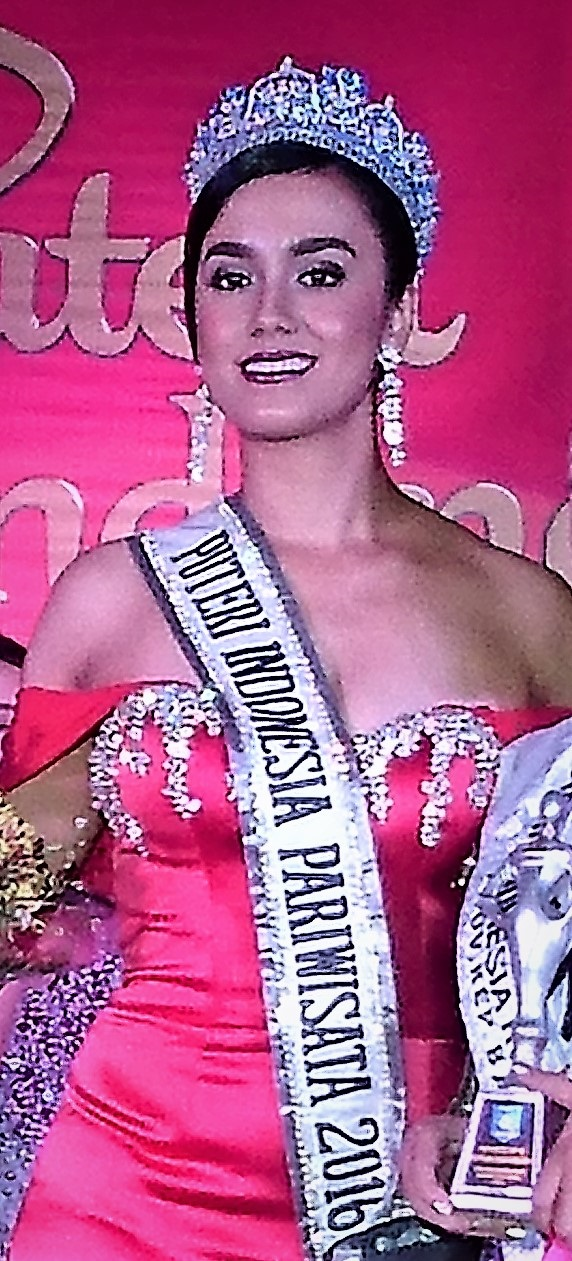
Aletrinö at the Puteri Indonesia Bangka Belitung 2016 contest on 1 October 2016.

=== Puteri Indonesia 2016 ===
Intan representing West Sumatra on Puteri Indonesia 2016, where she was crowned as Puteri Indonesia Pariwisata 2016 at the grand finale held in Jakarta Convention Center, Jakarta, Indonesia on 19 February 2016, by the outgoing titleholder of Puteri Indonesia Pariwisata 2015, Gresya Amanda Maaliwuga of North Sulawesi.

She crowned together with Puteri Indonesia; Kezia Roslin Cikita Warouw of North Sulawesi, Puteri Indonesia Lingkungan; Felicia Hwang Yi Xin of Lampung, and Puteri Indonesia Perdamaian; Ariska Pertiwi of North Sumatra.

=== Miss Supranational 2016 ===
As Puteri Indonesia Pariwisata 2016, Intan represented Indonesia at the 8th edition of the Miss Supranational pageant held in Hala MOSiR (Hall of Sports), Krynica-Zdrój, Poland on 12 December 2016. She is wearing traditional kebaya designed by Anne Avantie as her evening gown. Intan brought a national costume with the Wayang Golek-inspired ensemble, is a Sundanese puppet arts from West Java, Indonesia, the UNESCO Intangible Cultural Heritage in Masterpiece of the Oral and Intangible Heritage of Humanity. The costume named "Enchanted Wayang Golek" designed by Jember Fashion Carnival. She ended up placed in the Top 10 and won Miss Elegance and Miss Multimedia Awards at the pageant. Stephania Stegman of Paraguay crowned Srinidhi Shetty of India as the new titleholder at the end of the event.

== Filmography ==
Intan Aletrinö has presenting on her own several variety TV talk show.

=== Talk show ===
Year	Title	Genre	Role	Film Production	Ref.
2019–present	Selebrita	Infotainment-talk show	as Herself	Trans7	
2019–present	Liga 1 (Indonesia)	Sports-talk show	as Herself	tvOne and iflix	
2021–present	Insert	Infotainment-talk show	as Herself	Trans TV	
2022–present	Merah Putih Peristiwa	News-talk show	as Herself	ANTV	

== See also ==
- Puteri Indonesia 2016
- Miss Supranational 2016
- Kezia Roslin Cikita Warouw
- Felicia Hwang Yi Xin

Awards and achievements
Preceded by Dara Anggun Sasra Sugiri	Puteri West Sumatra; 2016	Succeeded by Puji Chegana
Preceded by Gresya Maaliwuga (North Sulawesi)	Puteri Indonesia Pariwisata; 2016	Succeeded by Karina Nadila (East Nusa Tenggara)
