= Felicia Hwang Yi Xin =

Indonesian model and actress

- 黃宜鑫
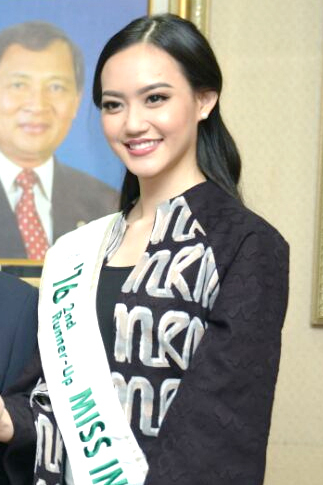
- Felicia during Ministry of Tourism and Creative Economy of The Republic of Indonesia press conference in 30 November 2016.
- Born: Felicia Hwang Yi Xin; 18 April 1992 (age 34); Bandar Lampung, Lampung, Indonesia
- Education: Bachelor of Business Accounting and Finance
- Alma mater: Bradford University
- Occupations: Model; actress
- Height: 1.73 m (5 ft 8 in)
- Spouse: Garry Jordan (m. 2019)
- Children: Timothy Duncan Jordan
- Beauty pageant titleholder
- Title: Puteri Indonesia Lingkungan 2016; Miss International Indonesia 2016
- Years active: 2016-present
- Major competitions: Puteri Indonesia 2016; (1st Runner-up – Puteri Indonesia Lingkungan); Miss International 2016; (2nd Runner-up)

Felicia Hwang Yi Xin popularly known as Felicia Hwang (Chinese: 黃宜鑫; pinyin: Huáng Yíxīn; born 18 April 1992) is an Indonesian model and beauty pageant titleholder who was crowned Puteri Indonesia Lingkungan 2016. She represented Indonesia at the Miss International 2016 pageant in Japan, where she finished as second runner-up and received the Miss Best Dresser award. Her placement matched the achievement of Indri Hapsari Suharto, who also finished as second runner-up at Miss International in 1977, marking the same result for Indonesia 39 years later. She is currently serving as the ambassador of the Indonesian National Narcotics Board.

== Personal life ==
Felicia was born in Bandar Lampung, Indonesia, on 18 April 1992 to a Chinese-Indonesian family background. She attended SMA Negeri 2 Depok (primary-secondary) and holds a bachelor's degree in business accounting and finance from Bradford University in Bradford, West Yorkshire, United Kingdom.

On 16 May 2016, Hwang was chosen as the Ambassador of the National Narcotics Board of Indonesia by the head of the agency, Budi Waseso. On 16 February 2019, she is married to Australian-Indonesian model and pastor, Garry Jordan. On 9 November 2019, she gave birth to her only son Timothy Duncan Jordan.

== Pageantry ==
=== Puteri Indonesia 2016 ===
In 2016, Felicia competed in the national pageant of Puteri Indonesia 2016, representing the province of Lampung. She ended up winning the Puteri Indonesia Lingkungan 2016 title, at the grand finale held in Jakarta Convention Center, Jakarta, Indonesia on 19 February 2016. Felicia was crowned by the outgoing titleholder of Puteri Indonesia Lingkungan 2015 and Miss International Indonesia 2015, Chintya Fabyola of West Kalimantan at the end of the event.

She crowned together with Puteri Indonesia; Kezia Roslin Cikita Warouw of North Sulawesi, Puteri Indonesia Pariwisata; Intan Aletrinö of West Sumatra, and Puteri Indonesia Perdamaian; Ariska Pertiwi of North Sumatra.

=== Miss International 2016 ===
As the winner of Puteri Indonesia Lingkungan 2016, Hwang represented Indonesia at the 56th Miss International competition. The final took place on October 27, 2016 at Tokyo Dome City Hall in Tokyo, Japan, where she finished as second runner-up. This marked Indonesia's second placement in the Top 5 at Miss International, following Indri Hapsari Soeharto's result in 1977, and was the country's highest placement at the time. The record was later surpassed when Kevin Lilliana won the title in 2017.

Hwang also won the Miss Best Dresser award for her Dewi Shinta-inspired national costume. At the conclusion of the event, the reigning titleholder, Edymar Martínez of Venezuela, crowned her successor, Kylie Verzosa of the Philippines.

== Filmography ==
After returning to Indonesia, in 2019 Felicia received an offer to play a role in a film directed by Red Bull entitled "The Rebels". Felicia started acting with a number of famous actors and actresses such as Luna Maya, Atta Halilintar, and Valerie Thomas. Since then, Felicia has appeared in several movies, including television films and cinema box-office movies.

=== Movies ===
Year	Title	Genre	Role	Film Production	Ref.
2019	The Rebels	romance film	as Madame Felice	Red Bull GmbH	

== See also ==
- Puteri Indonesia 2016
- Miss International 2016
- Kezia Roslin Cikita Warouw
- Intan Aletrinö
- Ariska Putri Pertiwi

Awards and achievements
Preceded by Laras Maranatha Tobing	Puteri Lampung; 2016	Succeeded by Feriska Anggrelita
Preceded by West Kalimantan; Chintya Fabyola	Puteri Indonesia Lingkungan; 2016	Succeeded by West Java; Kevin Lilliana Junaedy
Preceded by Kenya – Eunice Onyango	Miss International; 2nd Runner-up; 2016	Succeeded by Venezuela – Diana Croce
