= Coblos Cinta =

- Movie Poster (2008)
- Directed by: Findo Purwono HW
- Written by: Sesa Nasution; Imam Darto
- Produced by: Adiyanto Sumardjono
- Starring: Nadia Saphira; Tommy Kurniawan; Jessica Iskandar; Gracia Indri; Siti Anizah; Alessia Cestaro; Marrio Merdhitia; Tarra Budiman; Melvin Giovanie; Boy Hamzah
- Cinematography: Joel Fadly
- Edited by: Den Mas Dera; Raenaldi Rangga
- Music by: Ardi Isnandar; Doddy Is
- Production company: Investasi Film Indonesia
- Distributed by: Investasi Film Indonesia
- Release date: 29 May 2008
- Running time: 90 Minutes
- Country: Indonesia
- Language: Indonesian

Coblos Cinta ("Vote for Love") is a 2008 Indonesian comedy film directed by Findo Purwono HW. The film produced by IFI, starring Nadia Saphira and Tommy Kurniawan, tells the story about two students who compete to become Head of the Student Council. There is a lot of rivalry between them when the two candidates try to gain influence on their campus by carrying out unique and ridiculous campaigns, with unexpected events as the election day approaches.

== Plot ==
Bella (Nadia Saphira) is a student who successfully running for the Head of the Student Council on her campus. Together with her success team, Putri (Siti Anizah), Icha (Gracia Indri), Sasha (Jessica Iskandar), and Heidy (Alessia Cestaro), Bella competes with Aldi (Tommy Kurniawan) who is handsome, smart, and good at winning the hearts of campus students . Aldi us supported by his success team, Ferry (Marrio Merdhitia) and Dimas (Tarra Budiman). Bella continues to run her campaign even though she’s not supported by her boyfriend, Rhino (Boy Hamzah).

The strategy for selling brownies for Bella's campaign funds was unsuccessful because the price was too expensive, and Aldi easily defeated it by using girl’s car wash as a strategy. Bella, who had not had time to prepare a counterattack, was even more aggravated by Aldi who opened a free massage booth for the campus student. After the pre-poll announcement that Aldi will win by a landslide victory, Bella is determined to defeat Aldi. Thanks to Sasha's advice, they began asking for money from office executives while wearing sexy clothes. Obviously, many executives are willing to give them large checks.

After Bella began competing with Aldi with a photo calendar and body painting strategy, she is unconsciously approached by Aldi, especially when Aldi drove Bella home after Bella broke up with Rhino. Outside Bella’s place, Aldi almost kissed Bella and it was photographed by a campus tabloid reporter who likes to create a sensation named Anto (Melvin Giovanie). The next day, the news and photos were published. This caused a chaos in Bella's group, Icha who secretly likes Aldi blames Bella and leaves, while the candidate debate will take place in two days.

After the debate, Bella actually gave up when the election day announcement, successfully persuaded Heidy, they both gathered on campus with Sasha and Putri, then Icha also came there and they reconcile. Announcement was reported with the results of Bella winning as the Head of the Student Council. When Anto triggered riots, Aldi calmed the situation while supporting Bella's victory. The film ends with Aldi and Bella together and Anto is locked overnight in the campus bathroom.

== Cast ==
- Nadia Saphira as Bella
- Tommy Kurniawan as Aldi
- Jessica Iskandar as Sasha
- Gracia Indri as Icha
- Siti Anizah as Putri
- Alessia Cestaro as Heidy
- Mario Merdhitia as Ferry
- Tarra Budiman as Dimas
- Melvin Giovanie as Anto
- Boy Hamzah as Rhino

=== Additional Cast ===
- Framly Daniel as Head of Student Council
- Intan Savila as Head of Faculty
- Ivan Gunawan as himself
- Adly Fairuz as himself
- Mama Dahlia as herself
- Kiki Farrel as himself

== Characters ==
- Bella is a very smart, idealistic and friendly woman. She has a high self-confidence and leader spirit. She is also strong-willed when she has a certain desire, she will try very hard to gets it.
- Aldi is Bella's rival in the election of the Head of the Student Council. He is an influential campus activist on his campus. Aldi is not a handsome guy, but his cool and charming style makes him pretty much adored by girls on his campus.
- Sasha is one of Bella's sexiest friends among other gang members. Aside from being an ordinary college girl, Sasha has a side "income" from a man with 2 children. He always has a way out for each gang problem even though the idea is often a little naughty.
- Icha is Bella's best friend. Icha who wears glasses is a woman who is gadget freak, she likes electronic devices. In addition, Icha also likes to write and do things related to technology. His personality tends to be introverted and likes to dream.
- Putri is Bella's friend who has a tomboyish character, ignorant, "crazy" ball, and a football bookie on her campus. He is a very loyal and typical person ‘follower’.
- Heidy is a girl who when talks, always in English. She likes to issue stupid questions / remarks, but sometimes there are some truths in it too. Being too honest, what on her mind immediately come out uncensored.
- Ferry is one of Aldi's best friends. He can always complete his tasks even though they often fall apart. Ferry is the person responsible for Aldi's naughty campaigns. His pretends to be masculine, to cover his femininity.
- Dimas is a member of Aldi success campaign who has the full name of Dimas Joko Prayitno (Dimas = Guaranteed Mas-Mas). Even though it is pretentious in imitating hip-hopers, when he speaks, a thick Javanese accent comes out. Dimas has a hobby of providing super-crisp rhymes and puzzles.
- Anto is a campus reporter who has annoying nature. He is always looking for sensations and happy with chaos.
- Rhino is Bella's possessive boyfriend and likes to belittle other people, especially women. He disagreed when Bella was elected as the candidate for the Head of Student Council and always tries to get his girlfriend to quit the election.
