= Lawang Sewu =

Historical landmark in Semarang, Indonesia

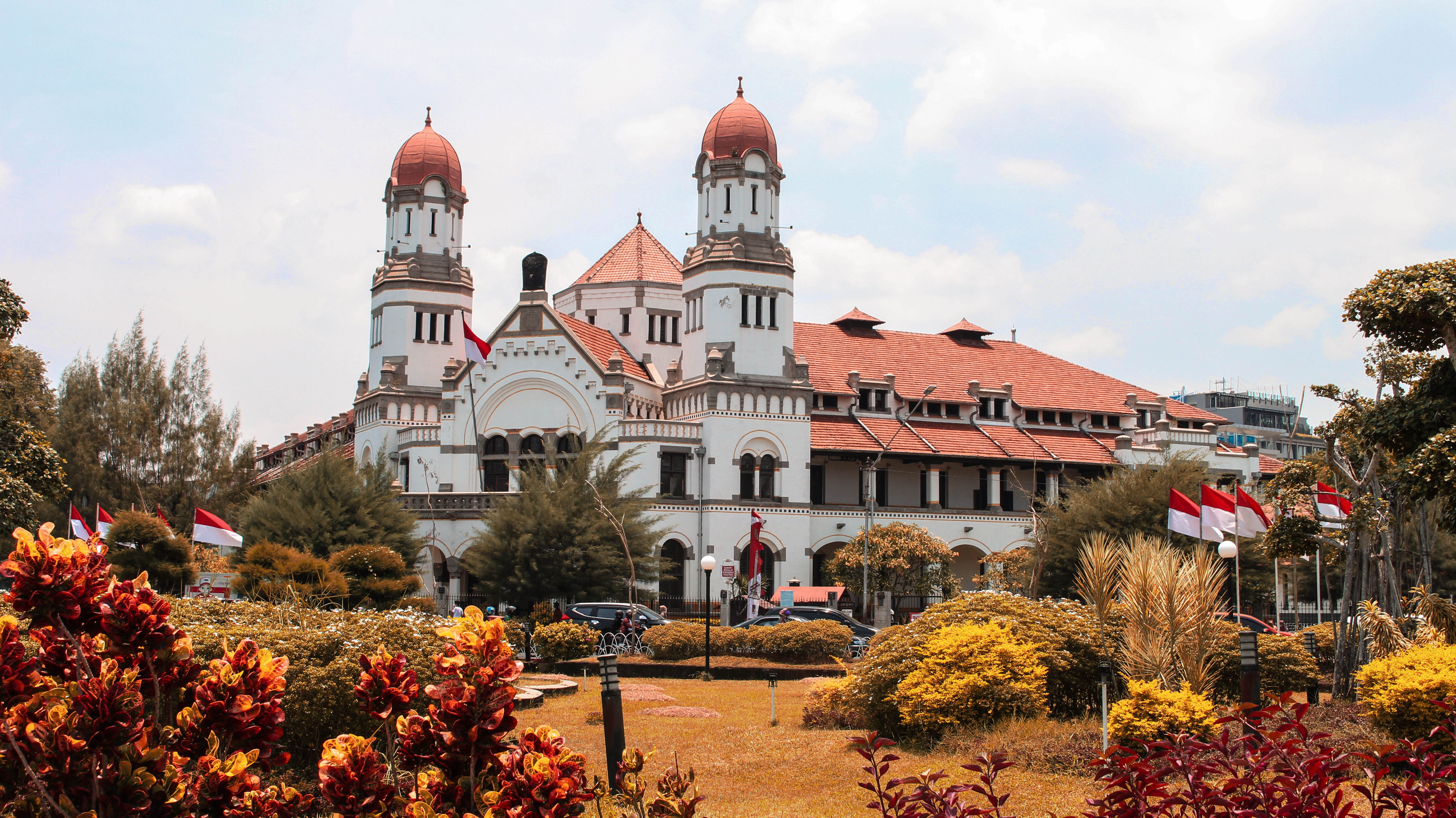
- Lawang Sewu, 2021

- Location within Semarang
- Former names: Administratiegebouw van de Nederlandsch-Indische Spoorweg Maatschappij te Samarang

General information
- Type: Office building
- Architectural style: New Indies Style
- Location: Pemuda Street, Semarang, Indonesia
- Coordinates: 6°59′2.13″S 110°24′38.28″E
- Groundbreaking: 1904
- Completed: 1919
- Opened: 1907
- Owner: Indonesian Railways
- Landlord: KAI Wisata

Technical details
- Floor count: 3

Design and construction
- Architect: C. Citroen
- Architecture firm: J.F. Klinkhamer and B.J. Ouëndag

Lawang Sewu (Note: Dutch: Administratiegebouw van de N.V. Nederlandsch-Indische Spoorweg Maatschappij te Samarang, lit. 'The headquarters of the Dutch East Indies Railway Company plc in Semarang') (Javanese: ꦭꦮꦁꦱꦺꦮꦸ) is a former office building in Semarang, Central Java, Indonesia. It was a head office of the Dutch East Indies Railway Co. (Nederlandsch-Indische Spoorweg Maatschappij/NIS) and is owned by the national railway company Kereta Api Indonesia (KAI). Its predecessor, Djawatan Kereta Api, seized every rail transport infrastructures and offices from Dutch occupation. Today the building is used as a museum and heritage railway gallery, currently operated by Heritage Unit of KAI and its subsidiary KAI Wisata.

== Etymology ==
The Javanese word lawang sewu is a nickname for the building, which means "a thousand doors". The name comes from its design, with numerous doors and arcs. The building has about 600 large windows.

== Layout ==
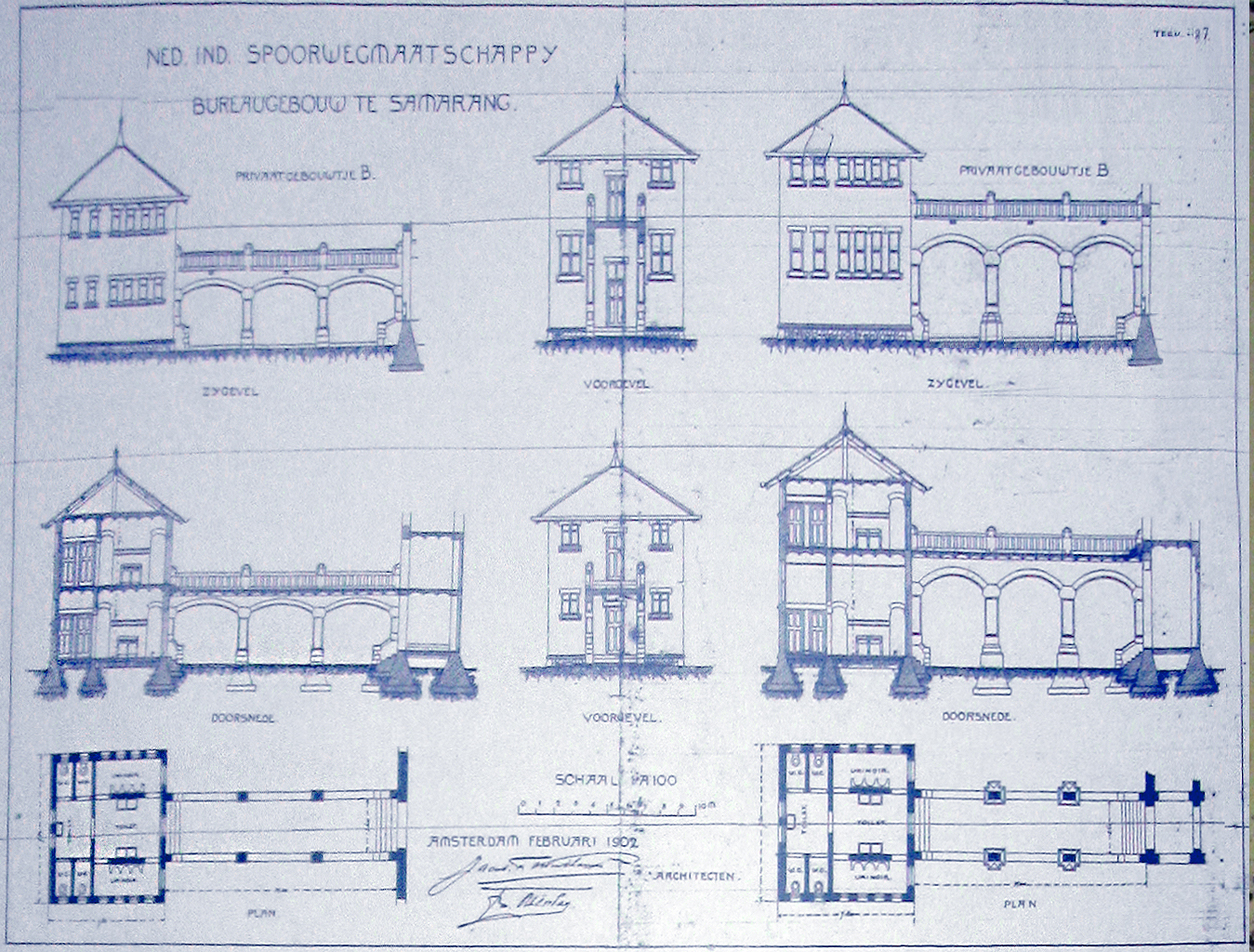
Blueprints for Building B

The complex consists of several buildings, two main ones named A and B and two smaller ones named C and D, on Pemuda Street. The L-shaped A building faces the Tugu Muda roundabout. There are two identical towers on A building, which were originally used to store water, each with a capacity of 7,000 litres (1,800 US gal). The building features large stained-glass windows and a grand staircase in the center. There was also once a tunnel connecting A building to several other sites in the city, including the governor's mansion and the harbour.

The B building is located behind A building. It is three stories in height, with the first two floors consisting of offices and the third holding a ballroom. The building, with high, large windows, also has a basement floor that is kept partially flooded to serve to cool the building through evaporation.

In front of A building stands a monument to five employees killed during the Indonesian National Revolution.

== History ==
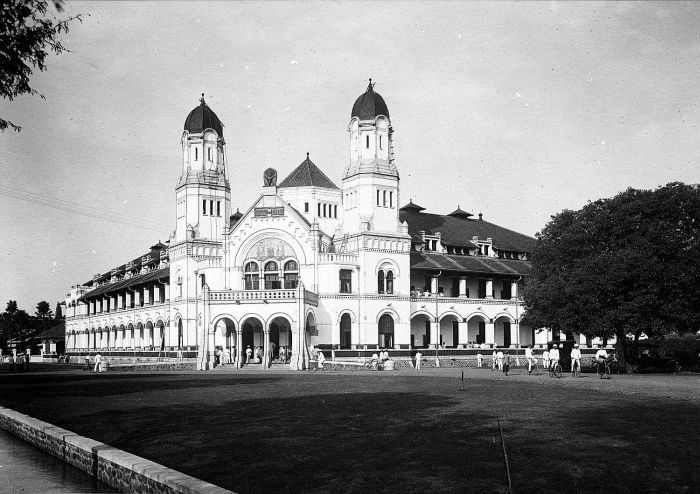
"A Building" in the early 1900s

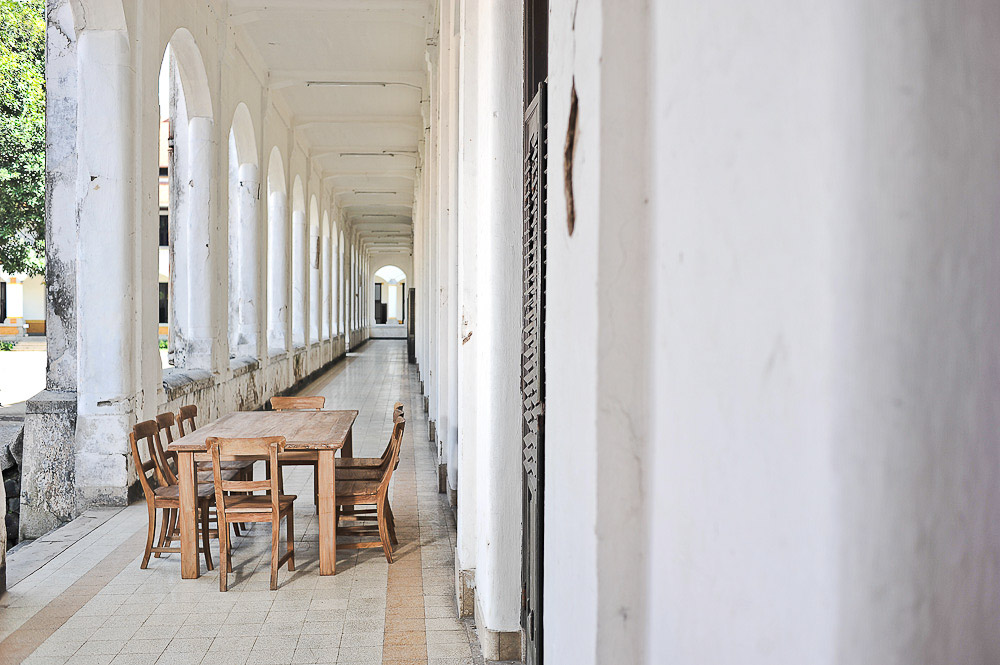
A side hall of the building

Lawang Sewu was designed by Cosman Citroen, from the firm of J.F. Klinkhamer and B.J. Quendag. It was designed in New Indies Style, an academically accepted term for Dutch Rationalism in the Indies. Similar with Dutch Rationalism, the style is the result of the attempt to develop new solutions to integrate traditional precedents (classicism) with new technological possibilities. It can be described as a transitional style between Traditionalists and the Modernists, and was strongly influenced by the design of Berlage.

The first Construction began in 1904 with A building, which was completed in 1907. The rest of the complex was finished in 1919. It was initially used by the Nederlandsch-Indische Spoorweg Maatschappij, the first railway company in the Dutch East Indies.

After the Japanese invaded Indonesia 1942, the Japanese army took over Lawang Sewu. The basement of building B was turned into a dungeon, with torture and execution taking place there. When Semarang was retaken by the Dutch in the battle; in October 1945, the Dutch forces used the tunnel leading into A building to sneak into the city. A battle ensued, with numerous Indonesian fighters dying. Five employees working there were also killed.

After the war, the Indonesian army took over the complex. It was later returned to the national railway company. In 1992, it was declared as a Cultural Property of Indonesia.

By 2009, the Lawang Sewu complex was in a state of considerable dilapidation. Simon Marcus Gower, writing in The Jakarta Post, noted it as being "dark and evidently sick. Its white walls are faded throughout; blackened by pollution and neglect. Rendered walls are cracked and any wall paper has long since fallen away to reveal the red bricks beneath. Mold and weeds grow over much of the building and mice and rats are the chief residents."

The building soon underwent renovations to ensure that it would be profitable as a tourist attraction. Governor of Central Java Bibit Waluyo mobilized several dozen soldiers to assist with the renovations; the soldiers focused on external repairs. Local residents were disappointed in the renovations, opining that it had lost its authenticity.

On 5 July 2011, the newly renovated complex was inaugurated by First Lady Ani Yudhoyono. However, at the time, only B building was available for tours. It is hoped to be a main attraction in the Central Javan government's tourism program in 2013.

Future plans include transforming Building B into office space, a food court, and even a gym. In late 2013, the Semarang city government announced plans to eliminate the building's "spooky image" in order to attract more visitors. This was to encompass a reimagining of the site as a place for social and cultural activities, supported by renovations of the building. At the time, Lawang Sewu attracted an average of 1,000 visitors daily.

== Haunting legend ==
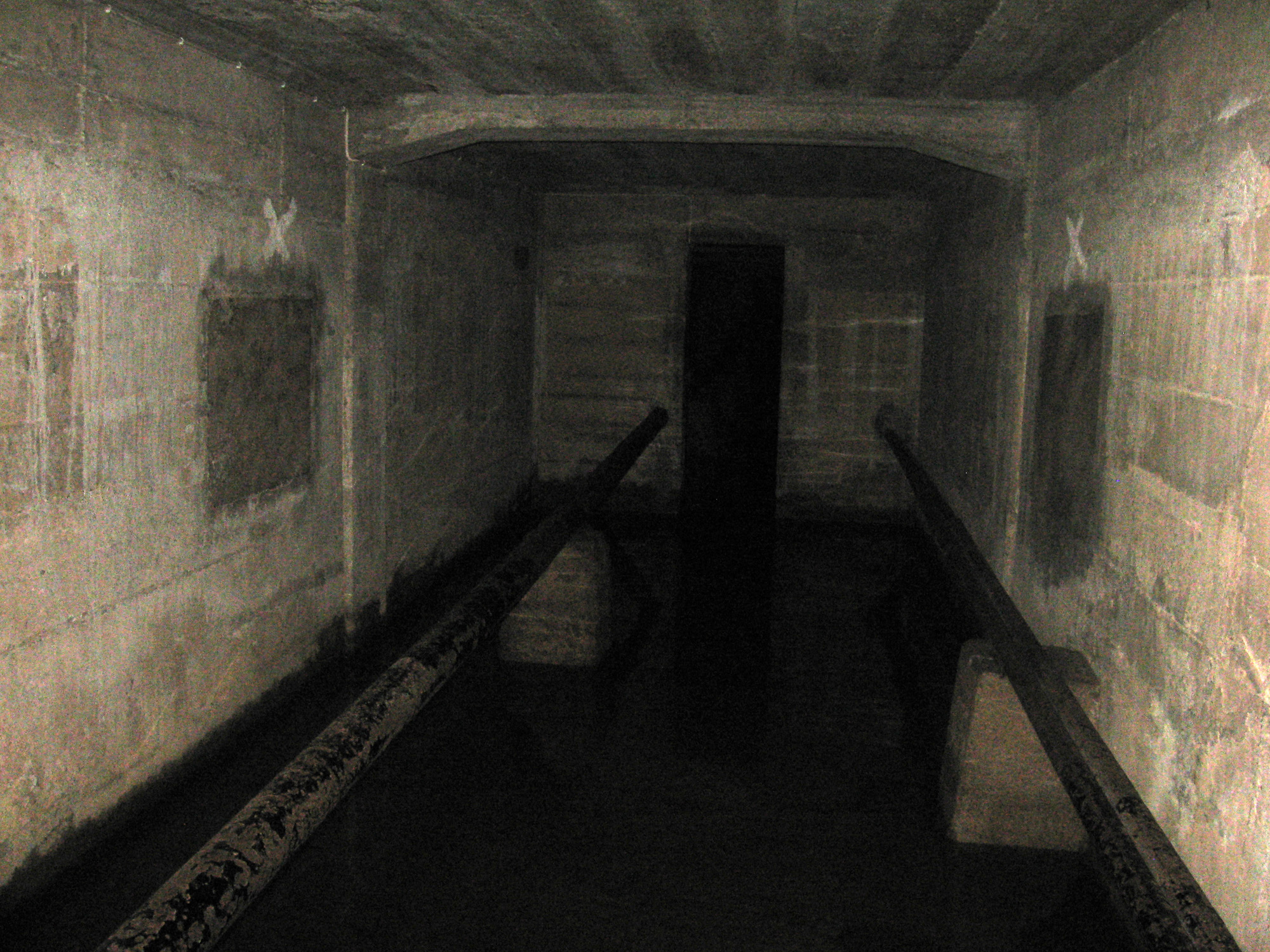
The basement of B building, claimed to be haunted

According to urban legend, the building is claimed to be haunted. According to Michael G. Vann, "decades of neglect" resulted in the abandoned building becoming subject to rumors, and "Ghost stories multiplied as Lawang Sewu truly began to look the part of a haunted house". These local ghost stories were "cemented into the national consciousness" with the 2007 Indonesian horror film Lawang Sewu: Dendam Kuntilanak (Lawang Sewu: Kuntilanak Vengeance).
