= Kung Fu Pocong Perawan =

- Directed by: Yoyok Dumpring
- Produced by: KK Dheeraj
- Starring: Jessica Iskandar; Olga Syahputra; Daus Mini; Yadi Sembako; Rizky Putra
- Distributed by: K2K Productions
- Release date: 12 April 2012
- Running time: 87 minutes
- Country: Indonesia
- Language: Indonesia

Kung Fu Pocong Perawan (lit. 'Virgin Pocong Kung Fu') is an Indonesian horror-comedy film which was released in theaters on 12 April 2012. The film was directed by Yoyok Dumprink. This movie starred Olga Syahputra and Jessica Iskandar.

== Plot ==
Memey (Jessica Iskandar) was kidnapped by Amsyong-Lu (Rizky Putra) when he attacked the kung fu school owned by her and Bohsiaw (Yadi Sembako). As a loyal friend, Angpao (Daus Mini) assists Bohlam (Olga Syahputra), Memey's boyfriend, in rescuing her from Amsyong-Lu. Unfortunately, on their way to save Memey, they crash and die, but they are compelled to return from the dead as pocong. In the end, they manage to rescue Memey.

== Cast ==
- Jessica Iskandar as Memey
- Olga Syahputra as Bohlam
- Daus Mini as Angpao
- Yadi Sembako as Bohsiaw
- Rizky Putra as Amsyong-Lu
