= Under the Tree (2008 film) =

- Directed by: Garin Nugroho
- Written by: Eros Djarot
- Starring: Marcella Zalianty; Ayu Laksmi; Nadia Saphira
- Cinematography: Yadi Sugandi
- Edited by: Andi Pulung Waluyo
- Release date: 2008
- Running time: 104 minutes
- Country: Indonesia
- Language: Indonesian

Under the Tree (Indonesian: Di Bawah Pohon) is a 2008 Indonesian movie directed by Garin Nugroho, as a follow-up to his celebrated film Opera Jawa. The movie stars Marcella Zailanty, Nadia Saphira, and Ayu Laksmi as the three women in their respective stories in the movie.

Similar to Opera Jawa, Under the Tree was universally praised by reviewers from both Indonesian and foreign countries' critics, with praise mostly directed to Nugroho's artistic view on the subject and the cast's performance. After released in several foreign countries, Under the Tree was released in Indonesia and was acclaimed, ended up receiving seven Citra Award nominations, including for Best Picture, Best Director for Nugroho, and Best Actress for Laksmi, winning two awards; Best Supporting Actress for Aryani Kriegenburg Williems and Best Art Direction.

== Plot ==
The film follows three women on their individual journeys in Bali. The first, Maharani (Marcella Zalianty), is an adoptee from Jakarta who has come to Bali to look for her birth mother. The second, Nian (Nadia Saphira), is a celebrity who goes to Bali to escape her family life back in Jakarta. The last, Dewi (Ayu Laksmi), is a radio personality whose husband is never home and who is carrying a dead child in her womb; Dewi must eventually choose whether to live or to commit suicide.

== Production ==
Nugroho and his production team spent 20 days filming on Bali, including in Ubud, Sanur, and Karangasem. The film was produced without a screenplay. Instead, the actors were asked to discuss their ideas for their characters with Nugroho, to ensure that they understood their own character.

== Themes ==
Nugroho notes that Under the Tree is a critique of suicide in Indonesia, and how very few people pay attention to it, including the government. He notes that "trees are attached to human lives". Nugroho has also stated that the movie has an environmental message.

== Release and reception ==
Under the Tree had its world premiere at the BFI London Film Festival. It later competed in the Tokyo Film Festival.

Nauval Yazid of The Jakarta Post notes that Under the Tree is somewhat mainstream for Nugroho, who generally makes art films. The film's choreography during the Balinese dancing is praised, as is storyline and Laksmi's performance. However, the other two main characters are described as not resonating as much as Laskmi, and the use of the shaky camera technique is criticized.

In its review of the film for the Toronto International Film Festival, Variety notes that Under the Tree mixes traditional Balinese music with modern issues, similar to the Javanese music used in Nugroho's previous film Opera Jawa; the execution is noted to be not "as well integrated" as in the older film. The brown-tinted and shaky camerawork was considered "sometimes near-nauseating."
