= Bert Johan Ouëndag =

Dutch architect

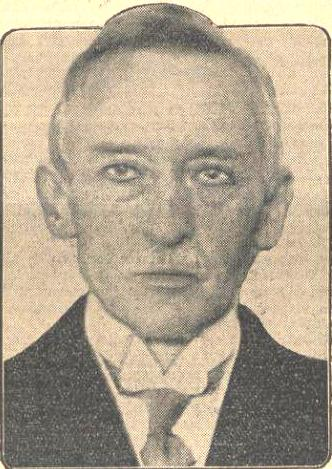
B.J. Ouëndag

Bert Johan Ouëndag, often recorded as B.J. Ouëndag, (1 December 1861 in Amsterdam - 21 September 1932 in Amsterdam) was an architect from the Netherlands.

== Career ==
Ouëndag trained as an architect in 1881 and won the competition for the design of a clubhouse for the Plant and Bird Garden in Arnhem. He then worked with city architect Jan Springer and after 1893 for architect J.F. Klinkhamer. He worked with Klinkhamer at a joint office from 1899-1905 and from 1905 with his son.

Ouëndag was Society's secretary-treasurer for promotion of architecture, member of the board of arbitration in the building trades and the committee disputes the BNA. He was also chairman of the committee of education for construction overseen and artist.

Ouëndag's designs include assisting on the NIS's administration in Semarang (along with Cosman Citroen) and the main building in The Hague. He also designed several branches of the Bank of Amsterdam, the Book House in Amsterdam, several schools, villas, pavilions for asylums and buildings in Artis.

Other buildings he designed were the Ramaer Clinic Loosduinen and the silo of the Heineken brewery in Amsterdam. He was an officer in the Order of Orange-Nassau (1931). On the occasion of his 70th birthday gave Architectural Weekly Architectura produced numerous illustrations of the works of Ouëndag. The editor of this magazine, JP Mieras, outlined in cordial terms his merits. He said: "We would like to compare it with that astronomers working in silence to calculate and "corrigiëren" each of those countless tables humanity unfamiliar with it, are useless. Facing the sea and the oceans, even in the deepest darkness, it is still safe boating. Noble work for which Nobel Prizes are awarded."

== Sources ==
- 'Architect BJ Ouëndag †', in Leeuwarder Nieuwsblad, 22 September 1932
- 'BJ Ouëndag †', in The Nation, 21 September 1932
- 'BJ Ouëndag †', in Algemeen Handelsblad, 21 September 1932
