= Lawang Sewu: Dendam Kuntilanak =

2007 Indonesian horror film

- DVD Cover (2008)
- Directed by: Arie Azis
- Written by: Aviv Elham
- Produced by: Dhamoo Punjabi; Manoj Punjabi; Dheeraj Kalwani
- Starring: Thalita Latief; Marcell Darwin; Melvin Giovanie; Tsania Marwa; Salvita Decorte; Ronald Gustav; Bunga Jelitha; Renny Djajoesman; Nuri Maulida; Yati Pesek
- Cinematography: Hendra Sutan
- Edited by: Waluyo Ichwandiardono
- Production companies: MD Pictures; Dee Company
- Distributed by: MD Entertainment
- Release date: 13 September 2007
- Running time: 112 Minutes
- Country: Indonesia
- Language: Indonesian
- Budget: USD 150,000

Lawang Sewu: Dendam Kuntilanak (Lawang Sewu: Kuntilanak's Vengeance) is a 2007 Indonesian Horror film directed by Arie Azis. The film tells about a group of seven teenagers from Jakarta in Semarang to celebrate their high school graduation. Along the road home after partying, they stopped by Lawang Sewu, a supposedly haunted building in Semarang, to relieve themselves. One of the girls went inside the building to avoid the boys and didn't come back. When they attempt to find their missing friend, the night turns into a nightmare for the other six, who find themselves haunted and terrorized by a Kuntilanak.

== Plot ==
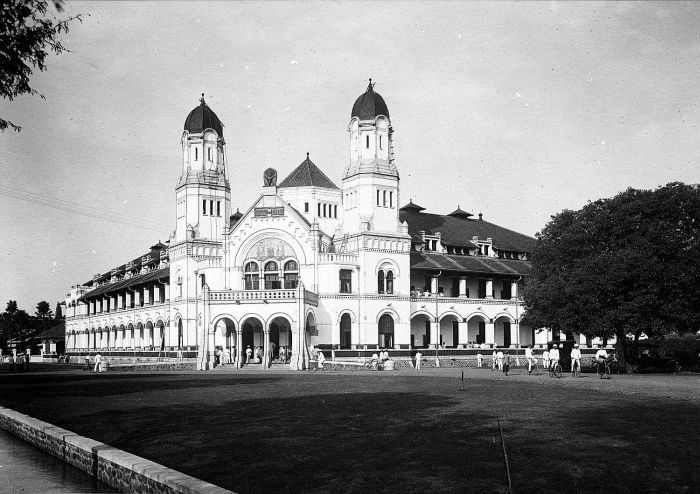
The A building of Lawang Sewu, where the film takes place, in the early 1900s.

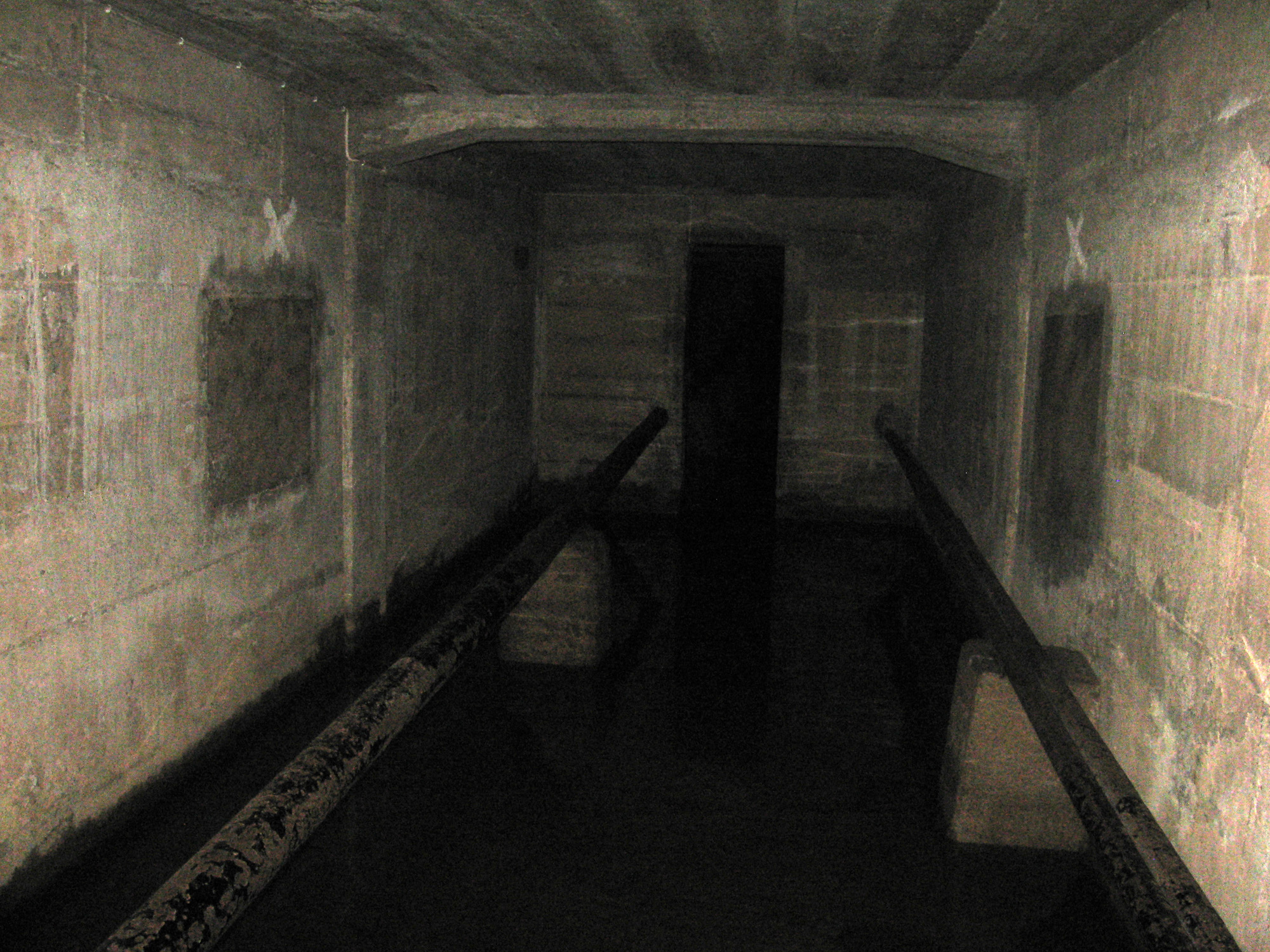
Naya, Armen, and Yugo are chased into the basement, where they encounter a kuntilanak.

Seven teenagers from Jakarta, Diska (Thalita Latief), Yugo (Marcell Darwin), Armen (Melvin Giovanie), Dinda (Tsania Marwa), Naya (Salvita Decorte), Onil (Ronald Gustav), and Cika (Bunga Jelitha), are in Semarang to celebrate their graduation from high school. All but Diska, who is driving the car, are intoxicated after going to a nightclub. On their way home to Naya's grandmother's house, Armen, Onil, and Yugo ask Diska to pull over so that they can relieve themselves; they stop at Lawang Sewu, and the boys urinate onto the grounds from outside the fence. Cika, who also must relieve herself, does not feel comfortable with the boys and goes into the building.

After wondering why Cika has not come back, the six enter the building to look for her. The ghosts inhabiting the building, angered by their lack of respect, begin to frighten them. The first to appear is the ghost of a Dutchwoman, Noni van Ellen, who possesses Dinda and causes her to yell and insult the others. After Dinda returns to normal, Diska tells her that she is violating the sanctity of the building by entering it while she is having a menstrual cycle. Onil is told to take Dinda outside, but before they can leave the building, they are approached by a kuntilanak with a ball and chain wrapped around her leg; Onil wets his pants, and the two hug each other as the ghost approaches them.

Meanwhile, Diska, Yugo, Armen, and Naya are in shock as they find Cika's dead body. When they are attempting to take the body away, the kuntilanak comes and chases them. Diska gets to the outside of the building, but Armen, Yugo, and Naya are chased into the basement, where the kuntilanak terrorizes them. Diska drives away to get help from Naya's grandmother. When they return, they attempt to drive away the ghosts by performing an exorcism; the ghosts rise up and kill Naya's grandmother, chasing Diska into the basement.

In the basement, Diska meets Armen, Yugo, and Naya. Armen tells her that he knows who the kuntilanak is: his ex-girlfriend Ratih (Nuri Maulida) who is also their schoolmate. She was unintentionally pregnant with Armen's child and chased out of Jakarta by Armen and his friends; Diska, who wanted to help her, was stopped by Naya and Cika. Upon arriving in her hometown of Semarang, Ratih was disowned by her family and in desperation committed suicide by throwing herself into a well at Lawang Sewu.

After discovering the truth, Diska rushes to the well to seal it. In the meantime, the kuntilanak takes the lives of Naya and Armen. Just as the kuntilanak is about to attack Yugo, Diska successfully closes the well, halting the kuntilanak's actions. Ultimately, Diska and Yugo depart together to return to their homes and carry on with their lives.

== Cast ==
- Thalita Latief as Diska
- Marcell Darwin as Yugo
- Melvin Giovanie as Armen
- Tsania Marwa as Dinda
- Salvita Decorte as Naya
- Ronald Gustav as Onil
- Bunga Jelitha as Cika
- Renny Djajoesman as Mbah Darmo
- Nuri Maulida as Ratih
- Yati Pesek as Yati

=== Additional Cast ===
- August Melasz as Ratih's Father
- Chicco Jerikho as Guy at the Club

== Production ==
=== Pre-production ===
Lawang Sewu: Dendam Kuntilanak was produced by MD Pictures, which had previously produced Kala (2007) and Suster Ngesot (2007). It was directed by Arie Azis and written by Aviv Elham, and drew its inspiration from stories about Lawang Sewu in Semarang, Central Java, a colonial building rumored to be haunted.

Pre-production began in mid 2007, with reports surfacing in early June that Arie Azis was in talks to direct the film, this was later confirmed by MD pictures. In June 2007, Thalita latief and Marcell Darwin were cast to star in the film. That month, Melvin Giovanie, Tsania Marwa, Salvita Decorte, Ronald Gustav, and Bunga Jelitha were also confirmed for roles in the film. In preparation for their roles, The actors and actresses traveled to Semarang to spend time in the city.

=== Filming ===
Principal photography began in late July 2007. Lasting for more than 30 days, shooting took place primarily at Lawang Sewu as well as other locations in and around Semarang, Central Java. Filming also took place at the Jakarta. While filming the scene where Dinda is possessed by the ghost of Noni Van Ellen, Tsania Marwa reportedly began speaking in fluent Dutch, a language she had never studied before.

== Themes ==
Manoj Punjabi, the film's producer, stated that he believed Lawang Sewu: Dendam Kuntilanak carried an important message, that humans as social creatures must always follow social norms and be aware of their surroundings; if not, he added, their secrets would be revealed.

== Release and reception ==
Lawang Sewu: Dendam Kuntilanak premiered at the Senayan City XXI Theatre on 19 September 2007, with a wide release the following day. It received a poor reception. Evi Febrian Surya, writing for the Semarang-based Suara Merdeka, gave the film a scathing review, saying that it "truly 'raped' an icon of Semarang." (Note: Original: ... sungguh hanya "memerkosa" salah satu ikon Kota Semarang ...)
