= Jessica Iskandar =

Indonesian actress (born 1988)

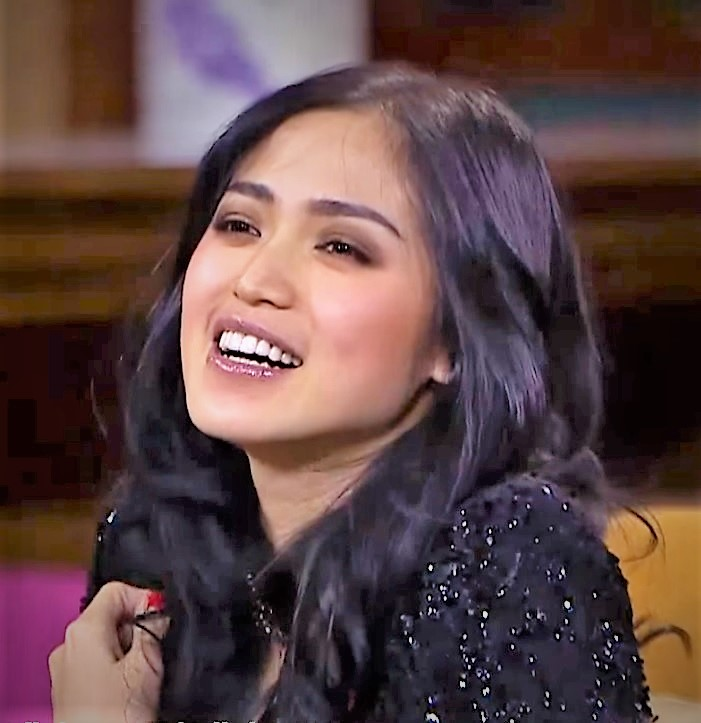
- Jessica Iskandar on Ini Talkshow in 2016
- Born: 29 January 1988 (age 38); Jakarta, Indonesia
- Other name: Jedar
- Occupations: Actress; model; presenter; singer
- Years active: 2004—present
- Spouses: Ludwig Franz Willibald Maria Joseph Leonard Erbgraf von Waldburg-Wolfegg-Waldsee (m. 2014; div. 2015) Vincent Verhaag (m. 2021)
- Children: El Barack Alexander von Waldburg-Wolfegg-Waldsee; Don Azaiah Jan Verhaag; Hagia Alyara Verhaag

Jessica Iskandar (born 29 January 1988) is an Indonesian actress, model, presenter, singer. She is also known by her nickname, Jedar.

== Early life ==
Jessica Iskandar was born on 29 January 1988 in Jakarta, Jessica Iskandar grew up in an interfaith family, as her father, Hardi Iskandar, is a Muslim and her mother, Wulandari, is a Protestant Christian. She is the youngest in the family and the only daughter' having 4 older brothers.

Jessica Iskandar finished her high school education at Bunda Mulia School. She continued her studies at Trisakti University, Jakarta, majoring in Interior Design. After three semesters, she decided to quit the university to concentrate on her career.

== Career ==
Jessica Iskandar began her career as a model. She attended John Casablanca modelling school. She made her first movie debut in 2005 as Kara in Dealova. Her next movie was Diva (2007) which was produced in Malaysia.

From 2008 to 2012, Jessica Iskandar starred in several soap operas and FTV (Television Movie) such as Gadis Pengantar Telur(2010) with Vino G. Bastian, Cinta Pura-Pura Nyasar(2010) alongside Rio Dewanto and Vicky Nitinegoro.

In February 2013, Jessica Iskandar published her first autobiography, JEDAR: Jessica Iskandar. In December 2014, Jessica Iskandar published her second autobiography, Jedar Power: Love, Life, Lord which recounted her experiences while she was expecting her first child, El Barack Alexander.

Jessica Iskandar began her career as a Presenter at Dahsyat on RCTI from March 2011 to 2013. In 2012, Jessica Iskandar was appointed as Indonesia Earth Hour ambassador.

In September 2018, Jessica Iskandar was invited to serve as a guest judge in Asia's Next Top Model Season 6 Episode 6 in Thailand.

In 2018, Jessica Iskandar started co-hosting a talkshow on TransTV, Ngopi Dara, with Nia Ramadhani.

Currently, Jessica Iskandar owns a fashion and cosmetic line, villa rental, as well as her own bakery which was named after her son.

== Personal life ==
On 11 December 2013, Jessica Iskandar married Ludwig Franz Willibald Maria Joseph Leonard Erbgraf von Waldburg-Wolfegg-Waldsee at Gereja Yesus Sejati, a Protestant church in Jakarta. Ludwig was a German citizen who was 2 years younger than Jessica Iskandar and the eldest son of the German aristocrat Johannes Franz Xaver Willibald Maria Joseph Philipp Jeningen Leonhard Fürst von Waldburg-Wolfegg-Waldsee, Châtelain of the Castle of Wolfegg and Head of the House of Waldburg.

On 8 January 2014, the marriage was registered at the Civil Registry Office.

On 21 July 2014, Jessica Iskandar gave birth to the couple's only child, a son named El Barack Alexander, in the United States of America.

On 13 October 2014, Jessica Iskandar's husband filed a petition requesting annulment at South Jakarta state court. He also filed a lawsuit at East Jakarta state questioning the validity of marriage licence. The first trial was set on 12 November 2014.

On 14 April 2015, East Jakarta state court dismissed the lawsuit with regards to the validity of the marriage licence. The petition for annulment reject Ludwig's lawsuit regarding the annulment of their marriage, because Ludwig and Jessica Iskandar's marriage is considered valid and at the same time, Ludwig has become the biological father of El Barack Alexander.

On 15 October 2015, the petition for annulment was granted and Jessica Iskandar was officially divorced.

On 15 June 2019, Jessica Iskandar officially announced her engagement to Richard Kyle, after one year of dating.

Jessica Iskandar was a wet nurse for Gempita Nora Marten, the daughter of her friend Gisella Anastasia and Gading Marten.

== Discography ==
=== Album ===
| Year | Title Album | Notes |
|---|---|---|
| 2010 | Cerita Cinta | Mini Album |

== Filmography ==
=== Film ===
| Year | Title | Role |
|---|---|---|
| 2005 | Dealova | Karra |
| 2007 | Diva | Mera |
| 2009 | Coblos Cinta | Sasha |
| 2009 | Nazar | Cindy |
| 2010 | Istri Bo'ongan | Dini |
| 2012 | Kung Fu Pocong Perawan | Memey |

=== Soap opera ===
- Kasmaran
- Kanaya
- My Best Friend's Sister
- Cinta Anak Majikan

=== Music video ===
| Year | Title | Artist |
|---|---|---|
| 2013 | Tanpa Dirimu | Killing Me Inside |
| 2012 | Cinta Tanpa Alasan | Putih |

=== Television film ===
- Ketika Wila Patah Hati (2008) as Wila
- Something About Bali (2010) as Bali
- Gadis Pengantar Telur (2010) as Galuh
- Cinta di Kandang Sapi (2009) as Seruni
- Cinta Pura-Pura Nyasar (2010) as Melisa
- Miss Clean Lebay (2012) as Mita
- Jejaka in Paradise (2010) as Chika
- Stay With Me Please (2010) as Lena
- Cinta Tak Kenal Bosan (2010) as Tiara
- Ada Cinta di Pulau Maimalu (2010) as Adelia
- Jesi Bawa Lari Hatiku (2010) as Jesi
- Buton Island's Romantic Story (2009) as Angki
- Not My Sassy Girl (2011) as Sassy
- Geng Vespa Terjerat Cinta (2011) as Cyntia
- Never Ending Bakmi (2011) as Ami
- Calo Cinta (2012) as Vina
- Ilana Pergi Ilina Menanti (2011) as Ilana dan Ilina
- Ketemu Cinta di Metromini (2010) as Tania
- Bad Boy's Diary
- Dibinatu Ada Cinta
- Romansa di Pantai Panjang
- Tiga Lawan Satu
- Nona Sabrina
- The Bad Luck Stiletto
- Alunan Cinta
- Nanno Si Nanny
- Tertusuk Keris Cinta Ngatiman
- Be My Valentine Siti Markonah
- Cewek Cantikku
- Cintaku Anak Majikan
- Cinta Karung Beras
- Kepentok Cinta Shahrukh Khan
- Gue Berhak Jatuh Cinta
- Jatuh Bangun Demi Cinta (2009)
- Terjaring Cinta Nelayan Cantik
- Aku Bidadarimu
- Cintaku Dibuat Mainan
- Tabrak Gue Dong
- Jangan Deportasi Cintaku
- Pangeran Kodok Mencari Cinta
- Romantika Cinta di Pasar Kambing
- SMS untuk Bidadariku
- Bukalah Hatimu Sedikit Untukku
- Juliet Sang Penakluk Arjuna
- Badai Pasti Kembali
- I Love You Juminten (2011)
- Jaka Tarub Mencari Cinta

== Endorsements ==
- Mobile Legends: Bang Bang (2017)
- D'Luxe Kintakun Collection (2017)
- Bintang Toejoe (2017) with Gilang dirga
- Komix Tube TVC (2013) with Marcel Chandrawinata
- Telkomsel
- Revlon
- Ramayana
- Kopiko
- Campina
- Viva

== Awards and nominations ==
| Year | Awards | Category | Result | Ref. |
|---|---|---|---|---|
| 2011 | 2011 Dahsyatnya Awards RCTI | Outstanding Guest Host | Nominated | |
| 2012 | 2012 Dahsyatnya Awards RCTI | Outstanding Guest Host | Nominated | |
| 2012 | Yahoo! OMG Awards | Most Wanted Female | Nominated | |
| 2015 | Silet Awards RCTI | Razored Life | Won | |
| 2015 | Fokus Selebriti Awards SCTV | The Most Controversional Case | Won | |
| 2016 | Mom & Kids Awards MNCTV | Mom & Kids | Nominated | |
| 2016 | Ada-Ada Aja Awards GTV (Indonesia) | Outstanding Artist | Won | |
| 2016 | Silet Awards RCTI | Razored Hot Mom | Won | |
| 2017 | Insert Awards Trans TV | Favorite Viral Celebrity | Won | |
| 2017 | Selebriti on News Awards MNCTV | Most Wow Mom | Nominated | |
| 2018 | Insert Awards Trans TV | Fashionable Mom & Kids (with El Barack) | Won | |
| 2018 | Insert Awards Trans TV | Couple Sweetheart (with Richard Kyle) | Won | |
| 2018 | Insert Awards Trans TV | Favourite Celebrity Gang (with Girls Squad) | Won | |
| 2018 | Silet Awards RCTI | Razored Romance (with Richard Kyle) | Nominated | |
