= Anak Ambar =

2020 Indonesian short horror film

- Film poster (2020)
- Directed by: Melvin Giovanie
- Written by: Fanny Gunawan
- Produced by: Melvin Giovanie; Fanny Gunawan
- Starring: Irene Sonia; Melvin Giovanie; Wellyranti; Nissy Ariana Meinard; Qory Sandyoriva; Levana Azzahra; Ilah Milah
- Cinematography: Edwin Effendi
- Edited by: Melvin Giovanie
- Music by: Kevin MacLeod
- Production company: Verbind Films
- Distributed by: Verbind Films
- Release date: 15 January 2020
- Running time: 15 minutes
- Country: Indonesia
- Language: Indonesian

Anak Ambar is a 2020 Indonesian short horror film. It was directed by Melvin Giovanie and written by Fanny Gunawan. The film tells a story about the belief of a mother who preserves the spirit of her stillbirth child (ambar child) by using attributes. Strange events begin to emerge when she temporarily stays with her eldest daughter, Mita, and Ferry, her son-in-law who does not accept her belief and disallow her to bring the ambar child's attributes into their house. The short film was released on January 15, 2020.

== Cast ==
- Irene Sonia as Mita
- Melvin Giovanie as Ferry
- Wellyranti as Mama
- Nissy Ariana Meinard as Mona
- Qory Sandyoriva as Sasa
- Levana Azzahra as Anak Ambar
- Ilah Milah as Mbak Darmi
