= Cosman Citroen =

Dutch architect

C. Citroen
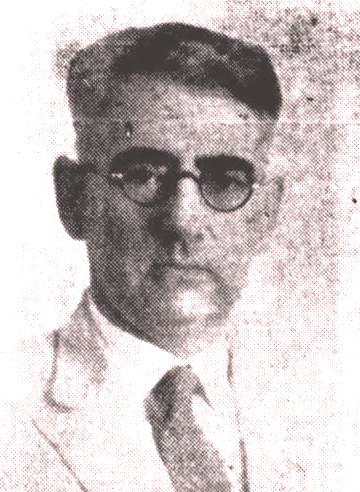
- Born: Cornelius Cosman Citroen; 26 August 1881; Amsterdam, Netherlands
- Died: 15 May 1935 (aged 53); Soerabaja, Dutch East Indies
- Occupation: Architect
- Notable work: Lawang Sewu

Cosman Citroen (26 August 1881 – 15 May 1935) was a Dutch architect. He designed buildings in the Dutch East Indies including the headquarters of the Dutch East Indies Railway Company.

== Early life ==
Citroen was the son of Levie Citroen (born on 12 November 1855), a diamond cutter in Amsterdam, and Sara Levie Coltof (born on 26 February 1852). The family included six children.

== Career ==
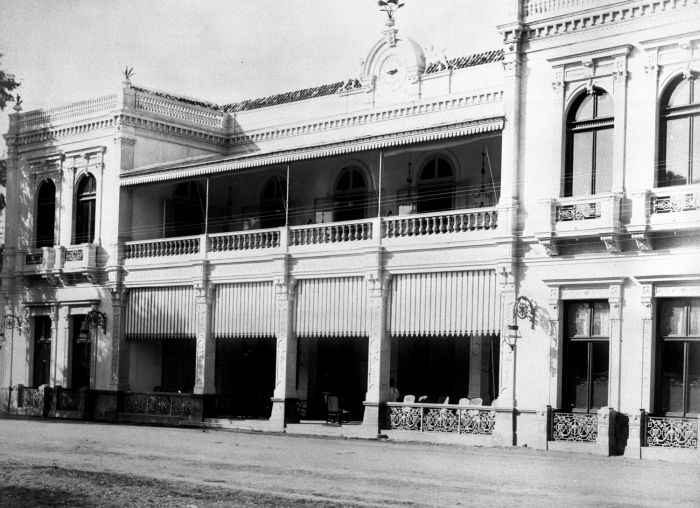
Sociëteit Concordia (Concordia Society)

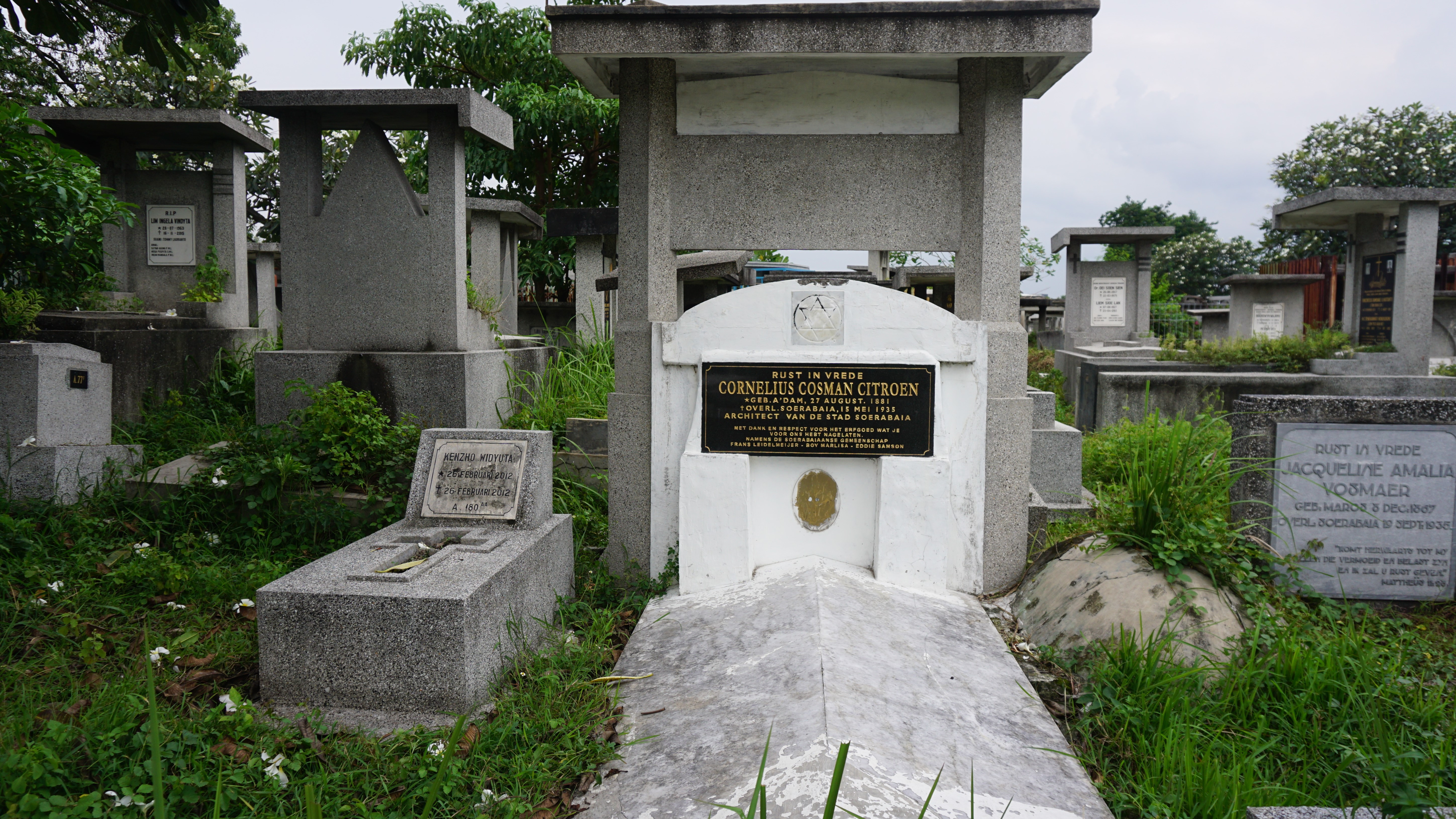
Citroen's grave at Kembang Kuning

Citroen took an architectural education at the State Normal School in Amsterdam and obtained his degree for teacher MO engineering. For the next thirteen years (1902 to 1915), he worked in the architectural firm of J.F. Klinkhamer and B.J. Ouëndag.

In 1907, he helped with the design of the NIS headquarters and worked as the company's bureau chief. In 1915, he left to move to the Dutch East Indies. In 1916, he made the first plans for a new town hall and designed the building for the Darmo Hospital. He was a member of several committees, such as the construction restrictions commission and the Archaeological Advisory Service. He was also president of the Museum of Antiquities Association in Surabaya and, during the last years of his life, an architectural advisor to the city of Surabaya. He worked on the urban plan for the area's expansion, including the town plan for Ketabang.

In his role as an architect, he was commissioned a plan for the renovation of the old society Concordia for British Petroleum Company. Other buildings which were designed Citroen house on Sumatra Street (later the American consulate), housing in Lawang, the street plan for Koepang, and an overpass on the Pasar Besar. He died after an operation at the age of 53 years from heart failure. The burial took place in Kembang Kuning.

== See also ==
- Colonial architecture of Surabaya
- Colonial architecture of Indonesia

== Sources ==
- 'Architect C. Citroen deceased "in the Algemeen Handelsblad, May 17, 1935
- C. Lemon. His career ', in the Indian Gazette, May 16, 1935
