= Mrapen =

Naturally occurring flame in Indonesia

Coordinates: 7.022662537676815°S 110.69988573720579°E

Mrapen (Indonesian: Api Abadi Mrapen) is an eternal flame in Indonesia that is the result of natural geologic activity.

== Location ==
The Mrapen eternal flame is located in Manggarmas village, Godong District, Grobogan Regency, Central Java, about 26 kilometers west of Purwodadi, Grobogan.

== Scientific basis ==
This eternal flame was created through natural geological phenomena; the leaking of natural gas from the ground. It is unknown when the gas leakage was ignited, but it is thought to have been ignited sometime before the 15th-century era of the Demak Sultanate as it was already known by then.

== Culture ==
It is said that the sacred kris heirloom dagger of the Demak Sultanate was forged in the Mrapen flame. The Mrapen flame is considered sacred in Javanese culture, and it is used in the annual Waisak Buddhist ceremony, where it is brought to the Mendut and Borobudur temples together with sacred water from the Umbul Jumprit spring. Beginning with the inaugural GANEFO in 1963, the flame of Mrapen has traditionally been incorporated into the torch relays of multi-sports events held in the country, such as the Southeast Asian Games. During the 2018 Asian Games torch relay, the Asian Games flame (which originated from New Delhi, India—host city of the inaugural 1951 Asian Games) was combined with a flame from Mrapen in a ceremony at the Prambanan temple.

== Extinguished ==
The flame went out on September 25, 2020; the cause of its extinguishing is being investigated. Officials are planning to relight the flame pending the results of this investigation.
