= Kereta Hantu Manggarai =

2008 Indonesian horror film

- Movie Poster (2008)
- Directed by: Nayato Fio Nuala
- Written by: Ery Sofid
- Produced by: Gope T. Samtani; Soebagio Samtani
- Starring: Sheila Marcia; Melvin Giovanie; Stefanie Hariadi; Nadila Ernesta; Gianina Emanuela; Fendi Trihartanto; Rina Hasyim
- Cinematography: Dharma You
- Edited by: Agung N
- Music by: Teguh Pribadi
- Production company: Rapi Films
- Distributed by: Rapi Films
- Release date: April 30, 2008
- Running time: 89 Minutes
- Country: Indonesia
- Language: Indonesian

Kereta Hantu Manggarai (The Ghost Train of Manggarai) is a 2008 Indonesian horror film directed by Nayato Fio Nuala. The film, starring Sheila Marcia and Melvin Giovanie, tells the story about a group of teenagers who performs a ritual to "summon" and board a train that is said to be a ghost train, in order to find their member’s missing sister. The film was released on April 30, 2008.

== Plot ==
Rossa is being scolded by her mother, Diah, because her sister, Emily is unknowingly missing. Rossa tells everything to her best friend, Tari about what happened, who then suspects, that Emily was taken away by a ghost train. Although she doesn’t believe it, Rossa followed Tari's suggestion to meet Bobby, who runs the 'Unseen World', a paranormal investigation website along with Doddy and Peggy.

Arriving at Bobby's house, Rossa feels that she had done something silly by following Tari and then hurries back home. In the cab, Rossa is having a flashback when she and Emily had a big fight. Rossa kicked her out of the house. Rossa's relationship with her sister has always did not go well because she felt her mother was more attentive to her sister. When she gets home, Rossa began to find strange apparitions of a female ghost.

Bobby invites Doddy and Peggy to ride the ghost train assisted by Ki Anom, a psychic. Doddy and Peggy hesitate, but Bobby persuades them by saying that this experience would be useful for their website. Elsewhere, Rossa again experience dreams of being terrorized by a female ghost, when she wakes up, she realizes she is in a cafe meeting Tari. Tari then confronts Rossa and says that she will go to the ghost train with Bobby's team, he also invites Rossa, but the Rossa is skeptical and rejects Tari's invitation.

Bobby, Doddy, Peggy, and Tari arrived at Manggarai Train Station. They perform a ritual to summon the ghost train with Ki Anom. After the train appears, they boarded the ghost train. Terrible events occur when they are on the train. Finally, they survived thanks to the help of Ki Anom. After they returned, many strange events happened. Doddy, while developing films and Tari while taking a bath, they were disturbed by a female ghost. Doddy is really panicking and he runs to meet Bobby to tell him about the strange events. Bobby says that he is too stressed out and need to calm down. The next day, when Doddy takes Peggy on the road using his motorbike, Doddy is tricked by the female ghost who pretends to be Peggy. Doddy, surprised by the ghost, frantically rides his motorbike until he is finally hit by a car and dies.

Tari and Rossa return to Bobby's house, they find Peggy who is at Bobby's house blaming Bobby for Doddy's death. Peggy gets out of Bobby's house, and Tari chases after her. Bobby tells Rossa that he is obsessed with the ghost train because he feels that his missing girlfriend was taken by the train. Rossa asks Bobby to bring her to Ki Anom, to ask him questions about her sister. When meeting Ki Anom, he, informs that Emily is in a coma and located in a remote village. When they travel back home, Bobby tells Rossa that the female ghost who terrorizes them continuously is a woman who was a satanic cult follower and died when the train crashed into a cliff. Bobby's car suddenly stopped above train tracks. A train appeared as if it would run over their vehicle. Rossa and Bobby panic and shout, and the train disappears.

Someone calls Rossa saying that Emily is found, and gives her the address. Rossa then told Bobby and rushed to the address. When they arrived, Emily is found unconscious. The residents explain that Emily was found on the train tracks. Bobby recommends bringing Emily to the hospital. Suddenly Bobby's cellphone rang, he discovered that Peggy had died. Emily wakes up, Rossa and Bobby immediately take Emily home. Before leaving, a person mentions that an evil spirit still possesses Emily and give a talisman to Rossa. Along the way home, in the car, Emily suddenly screamed because in her eyes she sees Rossa as a ghost. Panicking, Bobby stops the car and Emily immediately goes out from the vehicle and down, she ran towards a train station.

Ki Anom calls Bobby, telling him that the female ghost is chasing the survivors of the ghost train. They try to find Emily, and Rossa finds her. When Bobby tries to approach Rossa and Emily, he is confronted by the female ghost and killed by a ceiling fan blade that tore at his neck. Rossa and Emily continue to run until they reach the railroad tracks, suddenly a train appeared out of nowhere tries to run over them. Rossa remembers the talisman and gives it to Emily. The ghost train runs over them, Emily survives, but Rossa is taken.

Emily returns home, but she is shocked to find herself still being terrorized by the female ghost. At the college, Tari reads the newspaper about Rossa's disappearance, then she opens up her locker and recalls the memories with Rossa as she sees her and Rossa's photos. When Tari closes the locker, Rossa's spirit appears, asking Tari for help.

== Cast ==
- Sheila Marcia as Rossa
- Melvin Giovanie as Bobby
- Stefanie Hariadi as Emily
- Nadila Ernesta as Tari
- Gianina Emanuela as Peggy
- Fendi Trihartanto as Doddy
- Rina Hasyim as Diah

=== Additional Cast ===
- Diah Cempaka Sari as Bobby's Girlfriend
- Abio Abie as Ki Anom

== Production ==
Kereta Hantu Manggarai drew its inspiration from stories about ghost train around Manggarai Train Station, in Jakarta, Indonesia. Movie shooting took place primarily in locations around Jakarta.

== Release and reception ==
The film was released on April 30, 2008 with a mixed reception.
