= Nadia Saphira =

Indonesian actress, model and lawyer (born 1987)

- Born: 20 October 1987 (age 37); Jakarta, Indonesia
- Occupation(s): Actress, model, lawyer
- Years active: 2003–2008

Nadia Saphira Ganie (born 20 October 1987) is an Indonesian actress, model and lawyer. Her first major role was in the TV series version of Ada Apa dengan Cinta? (2003–2005) on RCTI. Her film career includes the romantic comedy Jomblo (2006), followed by Coklat Stroberi (2007), Cintapuccino and Under the Tree (2008). She appeared in various Indonesian TV series, such as Impian Cinderella (2006), Rahasia Pelangi (2011) and a serial of Jomblo (2007).

== Early life ==
Nadia was born in Jakarta, the daughter of Junaedy Ganie, a business executive and insurance specialist, who served as the CEO of BNI Life. Nadia graduated from public school SMA Negeri 70 Bulungan, Jakarta and received her bachelor's degree of law from Pelita Harapan University. Then she earned her master's degree from the University of Westminster, London in 2013.

== Career ==
She was one of the finalists of GADIS SAMPUL 2003. After graduating from the University of Westminster, she returned to Indonesia to pursue a career in law. She started with O.C. Kaligis and Lucas S.H. & Partners. She later opened her own law firm, Bayuputra Hutasoit Ganie.

== Filmography ==
=== Film ===
Year	Title	Role	Notes
2006	Jomblo	Lani	
2007	Coklat Stroberi	Key	
2007	Cintapuccino	Alin	
2008	Coblos Cinta	Bella	
2008	Under the Tree	Nian	
2008	Saus Kacang	Ila	

=== Television ===
Year	Title	Role	Notes
2003	Ada Apa dengan Cinta? TV Series	Milly	
2006	Impian Cinderella	Putri	
2006	Dunia Tanpa Koma	Bunga	
2007	Jomblo TV series	Lani	
2010	Rama dan Ramona	Ramona	
2011	Rahasia Pelangi	Pelangi	
