= Puteri Indonesia 2016 =

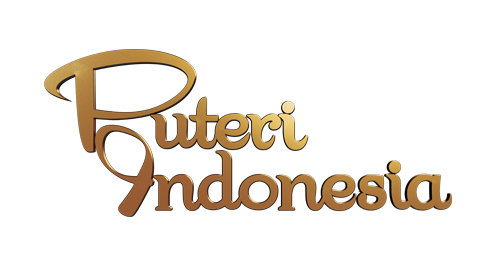
- Big 3 of Puteri Indonesia
- Date: February 19, 2016
- Presenters: Choky Sitohang, Maria Selena Nurcahya
- Entertainment: Yovie & Nuno, Bunga Citra Lestari, Andien, 5 Romeo, Lea Simanjuntak, Nada Badira, Rizky Febian, JKT48, Tulus
- Venue: Jakarta Convention Center, Jakarta
- Broadcaster: Indosiar
- Entrants: 39
- Placements: 10
- Debuts: North Kalimantan
- Returns: Gorontalo
- Winner: Kezia Warouw; North Sulawesi

Puteri Indonesia 2016, the 20th Puteri Indonesia pageant, was held on February 19, 2016 at Jakarta Convention Center, Jakarta, Indonesia. Anindya Kusuma Putri, Puteri Indonesia 2015 of Central Java, crowned her successor Kezia Warouw of North Sulawesi at the end of the event. All 39 contestants from 34 provinces competed for the crown. The winner represented Indonesia at the Miss Universe 2016, while the runners-up competed at Miss International 2016, Miss Supranational 2016, and Miss Grand International 2016. Also Miss International 2015 Edymar Martínez of Venezuela attend at the Grand Final Show. It is traditional for Miss Universe to attend on the Final Show of Puteri Indonesia, but Miss Universe 2015 of the Philippines had fashion show scheduled in New York City at the same time, and could not attend. Miss International 2015 replaced her as special guest.

Kezia Warouw was the second woman from North Sulawesi to be selected as the winner of the Puteri Indonesia, after Angelina Sondakh in 2001. She crowned together with Puteri Indonesia Lingkungan; Felicia Hwang Yi Xin of Lampung, Puteri Indonesia Pariwisata; Intan Aletrinö of West Sumatra and Puteri Indonesia Perdamaian; Ariska Putri Pertiwi of North Sumatra.

Puteri Indonesia 2016 is one of the most successful pageants in Puteri Indonesia history, as it produced one title holder and every delegate placed at their respective pageants.

== Results ==
=== Main ===
The Crowns of Puteri Indonesia Title Holders

Puteri Indonesia 2016 (Miss Universe Indonesia 2016)
Puteri Indonesia Lingkungan 2016 (Miss International Indonesia 2016)
Puteri Indonesia Pariwisata 2016 (Miss Supranational Indonesia 2016)
Puteri Indonesia Perdamaian 2016 (Miss Grand Indonesia 2016)

| Final Results | Contestant | International Placement |
|---|---|---|
| Puteri Indonesia 2016 (Miss Universe Indonesia) | North Sulawesi: Kezia Roslin Cikita Warouw | Top 13 – Miss Universe 2016 |
| Puteri Indonesia Lingkungan 2016 (Miss International Indonesia) | Lampung: Felicia Hwang Yi Xin | 2nd Runner-up – Miss International 2016 |
| Puteri Indonesia Pariwisata 2016 (Miss Supranational Indonesia) | West Sumatra: Intan Aletrino | Top 10 – Miss Supranational 2016 |
| Puteri Indonesia Perdamaian 2016 (Miss Grand Indonesia) | North Sumatra: Ariska Putri Pertiwi | WINNER – Miss Grand International 2016 |
| 4th Runner-up | Jakarta SCR 1: Claudya Dara Chaerunnisa | |
| Top 10 | South Sumatra: Ratih Anggraini; Banten: Belda Amelia; Aceh: Khairunnisa Zakaria; Jakarta SCR 2: Mutia Ardi; Bali: Anak Agung Sagung Istri Karina Prabasari | |

== Contestants ==
39 Contestants have been confirmed. The information from Puteri Indonesia Official website.

| Province | Name | Age | Height | Hometown |
|---|---|---|---|---|
| Aceh | Khairunnisa Zakaria | 21 | 170 cm (5 ft 7 in) | Lhokseumawe |
| North Sumatra | Ariska Putri Pertiwi | 21 | 173 cm (5 ft 8 in) | Medan |
| West Sumatra | Intan Aletrino | 22 | 175 cm (5 ft 9 in) | Padang |
| Riau | Kurnia Illahi | 22 | 174 cm (5 ft 8 1/2 in) | Bengkalis |
| Riau Islands | Agita Maryalda Zahidin | 25 | 171 cm (5 ft 7 1/2 in) | Batam |
| Jambi | Maulia Lestari | 21 | 170 cm (5 ft 7 in) | Jambi |
| South Sumatra | Ratih Anggrayani | 23 | 178 cm (5 ft 10 in) | Palembang |
| Bangka Belitung | Cinderi Maura Restu Buruj | 20 | 172 cm (5 ft 7 1/2 in) | Tanjung Pandan |
| Bengkulu | Dessi Tri Widiarti | 19 | 171 cm (5 ft 7 1/2 in) | Manna |
| Lampung | Felicia Hwang Yi Xin | 23 | 173 cm (5 ft 8 in) | Bandar Lampung |
| Jakarta Special Capital Region 1 | Claudya Dara Chaerunnisa | 21 | 170 cm (5 ft 7 in) | Jakarta |
| Jakarta Special Capital Region 2 | Mutia Ardi | 20 | 172 cm (5 ft 7 1/2 in) | Jakarta |
| Jakarta Special Capital Region 3 | Niken Ayu Lativani Wahyudi | 22 | 171 cm (5 ft 7 1/2 in) | Jakarta |
| Jakarta Special Capital Region 4 | Diana Maharani | 25 | 172 cm (5 ft 7 1/2 in) | Jakarta |
| Jakarta Special Capital Region 5 | Kurnia Anggrayani | 23 | 174 cm (5 ft 8 1/2 in) | Jakarta |
| Jakarta Special Capital Region 6 | Delicia Gemma Syah Marita | 22 | 173 cm (5 ft 8 in) | Jakarta |
| Banten | Belda Amelia | 20 | 173 cm (5 ft 8 in) | Tangerang |
| West Java | Evan Lysandra | 21 | 174 cm (5 ft 8 1/2 in) | Bandung |
| Central Java | Disma Ajeng Rastiti | 22 | 169 cm (5 ft 6 1/2 in) | Grobogan |
| Yogyakarta Special Region | Yohana Setianing Sejati | 22 | 170 cm (5 ft 7 in) | Yogyakarta |
| East Java | Badzlina Sukmawati | 22 | 170 cm (5 ft 7 in) | Surabaya |
| Bali | Anak Agung Sagung Istri Karina Prabasari | 20 | 168 cm (5 ft 6 in) | Denpasar |
| West Nusa Tenggara | Ghea Putri Mulya | 20 | 175 cm (5 ft 9 in) | Mataram |
| East Nusa Tenggara | Gloria Angelica Radja Gah | 24 | 170 cm (5 ft 7 in) | Sabu Raijua |
| West Kalimantan | Kornelia Meylinda Betsyeba | 22 | 170 cm (5 ft 7 in) | Sintang |
| South Kalimantan | Nina Nurlina | 21 | 167 cm (5 ft 5 1/2 in) | Banjarmasin |
| Central Kalimantan | Husnul Dwi Amalia | 19 | 165 cm (5 ft 5 in) | Palangkaraya |
| East Kalimantan | Novita Adipati Chandra | 23 | 168 cm (5 ft 6 in) | Balikpapan |
| North Kalimantan | Silvi Monica | 19 | 169 cm (5 ft 6 1/2 in) | Tarakan |
| South Sulawesi | Yulinar Pratiwi Arief | 18 | 171 cm (5 ft 7 1/2 in) | Makassar |
| West Sulawesi | Sophia Devi Kadda Taiyeb | 21 | 165 cm (5 ft 5 in) | Mamasa |
| Southeast Sulawesi | Nastika Aprilia | 24 | 170 cm (5 ft 7 in) | Kendari |
| Central Sulawesi | Suci Khanisa | 19 | 173 cm (5 ft 8 in) | Palu |
| North Sulawesi | Kezia Warouw | 24 | 183 cm (6 ft 0 in) | Manado |
| Gorontalo | Anna Juliana Ulaan | 21 | 168 cm (5 ft 6 in) | Gorontalo |
| Maluku | Jean Trifena Patty † | 25 | 165 cm (5 ft 5 in) | Ambon |
| North Maluku | Nia Nadia Chalil | 22 | 176 cm (5 ft 9 1/2 in) | Ternate |
| West Papua | Lita Ayudiah Capriati Makatita Mawar | 23 | 170 cm (5 ft 7 in) | Sorong |
| Papua | Aryani Mei Juventina Sitorus | 19 | 167 cm (5 ft 5 1/2 in) | Timika |

== Post pageant notes ==
- Kezia Warouw, Miss Universe Indonesia, finished Top 13 (10th placed) semi-finalists on the Miss Universe 2016 held on January 30, 2017 at Mall of Asia Arena in Pasay, Philippines.
- Felicia Hwang, Miss International Indonesia, was 2nd Runner-Up at Miss International 2016 during the finals held on October 27 at the Tokyo Dome City Hall in Tokyo, Japan.
- Intan Aletrino, Miss Supranational Indonesia, was hailed as one of the Top 10 (7th placed) finalists at Miss Supranational 2016 was held in Poland on December 2, 2016.
- Ariska Putri, Miss Grand International Indonesia, was crowned Miss Grand International 2016 during the finals held on October 25 at the Westgate Las Vegas Resort & Casino in Las Vegas, USA.
