= Diva (2007 film) =

- Directed by: Sharad Sharan
- Written by: Sharad Sharan; Vikram Sood
- Produced by: Sharad Sharan; Renu Sharan (executive)
- Starring: Ning Baizura; Jeremy Thomas; Awal Ashaari; Adam AF2; Jessica Iskandar; Balkisyh Semundur Khan
- Cinematography: Chirantan Das
- Edited by: Suresh Pai
- Music by: Mithoon Sharma
- Production companies: Astro Shaw; Tarantella Pictures; Nusantara Pictures
- Distributed by: Buena Vista Columbia Tristar Films
- Release date: 28 June 2007
- Running time: 90 minutes
- Country: Malaysia
- Language: Malay
- Budget: MYR 3.5 million
- Box office: MYR 300,000

Diva (English: Diva) is a 2007 Malaysian Malay-language musical drama film that was jointly produced by Nusantara Films, a subsidiary of Astro Shaw, and the independent film production house Tarantella Pictures. It was directed by Sharad Sharan, an Indian citizen working in Indonesia, and with music composed by Mithoon Sharma, an Indian citizen. Diva had a cast composed of Indonesians and Malaysians. The film was produced at a cost of 3.5 million rupiahs. It had a simultaneous release scheduled for June 2007 in Brunei, India, Indonesia, Malaysia, and Singapore. The screening was scheduled to begin on 28 June of that year.

The film soundtrack CD, the first musical collaboration between India and Malaysia, was released on 15 March 2007 in Brunei, India, Indonesia, Malaysia, and Singapore. Mithoon, a 21-year-old, composed five of the songs. Loloq wrote the lyrics.

== Plot ==
The musical is about Kartika, an Indonesian singer. After returning from travelling abroad, Kartika seeks to develop the skills of four young people but they instead sign up for a record label competing against her label.

== Cast ==
- Ning Baizura as Kartika
- Jeremy Thomas as Arman
- Awal Ashaari as Jay
- Adam AF2 as Idit
- Jessica Iskandar as Mera
- Balkisyh Semundur Khan as Eja
- Mizal Zaini as Rudy
- Shenny Andrea as Siska
- Fauziah Nawi as ibu Niken
- Pushpa Narayan as Sasha
