= Tommy Kurniawan =

Indonesian politician (born 1984)

Member of the House of Representatives
- Incumbent
- Assumed office 1 October 2019
- Constituency: West Java V

Personal details
- Born: 15 September 1984 (age 42)
- Party: National Awakening Party (since 2014)

Tommy Kurniawan (born 15 September 1984) is an Indonesian politician serving as a member of the House of Representatives since 2019. He has served as chairman of the youth wing of the National Awakening Party since 2016.
