= Jacob Frederik Klinkhamer =

Dutch architect

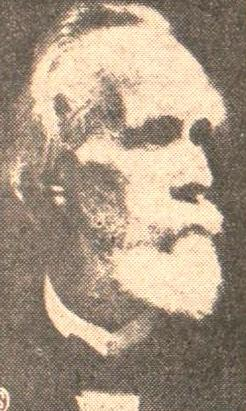
J. F. Klinkhamer in 1928

Jacob (Jaap) Frederik Klinkhamer (born 21 June 1854 in Amsterdam; died 12 December 1928 in The Hague) was a Dutch architect and professor of architecture. He designed several buildings in the Netherlands, Dutch East Indies and South Africa.

== Career ==
Klinkhamer studied in Delft at the then Polytechnic, where in 1878 he graduated as a civil engineer. He started in 1882 as an independent architect in Amsterdam. With Dolf van Gendt he designed the Granary Korthals Altes (ca. 1895). He designed railroad building including Main II (Utrecht, ca. 1893), an office building for the NISM (Semarang, circa 1902) and the station building of Soestdijk and Baarn Station (both about 1897). He also designed villas and houses. Several of his works are recognized as significant. He worked with John Springer, B.J. Ouëndag and Cosman Citroen. From 1905 to 1 September 1924 he was Professor of Civil Engineering in Delft.

He married Margaret Elizabeth Bosscha, daughter of the professor / director John Bosscha Jr. and they had six children. He died at the age of 76 years in The Hague and was cremated in [[Westerveld]].

== Works ==
- Headquarters of the Dutch East Indian Railway in Semarang
- Station Soestdijk (ca. 1897)
- Goods shed belonging to Station Soest (ca. 1897)
- Monumental villa in The Hague (c.1903, Prince Mauritslaan 1). The design is Klinkhamer and Ouëndag.
- Gravemarker of Gerardus Frederik Westerman (Amsterdam, ca. 1891)
- Granary Korthals Altes

== Gallery ==
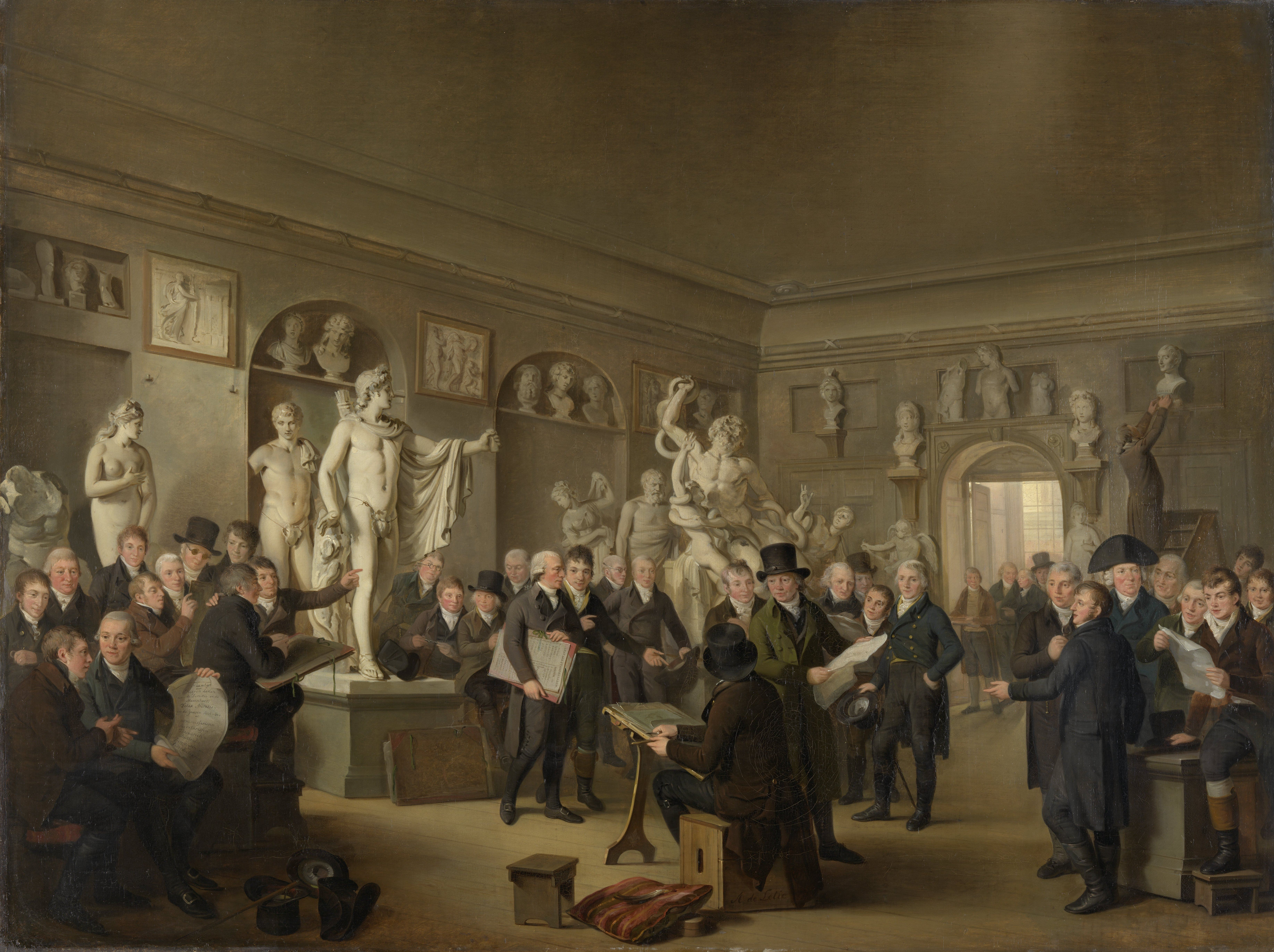
The sculpture gallery of the Felix Meritis Society in Amsterdam with portraits of the Commissioners and Directors, plaster casts of antique statues, busts and reliefs as well as depictions of member artists including Klinkhamer

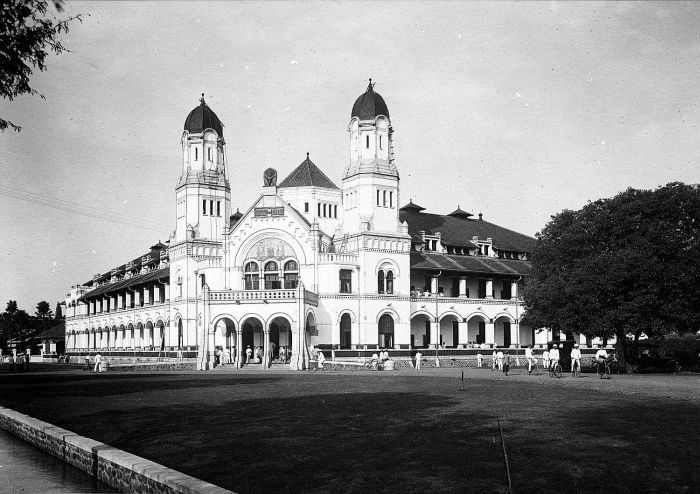
Headquarters of the Dutch East Indian Railway in Semarang

== Sources ==
- 'Professor JF Klinkhamer † "in the Algemeen Handelsblad, 13 December 1928
- "Cremation Professor JF Riveter" in the Algemeen Handelsblad, 16 December 1928
- 'Professor JF Klinkhamer deceased "in Time, 13 December 1928
- Baalman D. (1992), Inventory of the archive JF Klinkhamer (1854-1928), Dutch Architecture Institute, Amsterdam
