= 2018 Asian Games torch relay =

- Host city: Jakarta & Palembang, Indonesia
- Distance: 10,000 km
- Torch bearers: 1,000
- Start date: 18 July 2018
- End date: 18 August 2018

The 2018 Asian Games torch relay preceded with a torch lighting ceremony on 15 July 2018 at the Major Dhyan Chand National Stadium in New Delhi, host of the first Asian Games. The flame was generated from a parabolic mirror directed straight at the sun.

It was organized by Detail Communication Creative Agency who responsible for safekeeping, handling ceremonies and relay for the event itself from India through all the locations in Indonesia.

On 18 July 2018, a ceremony took place in Brahma field by the 9th century Hindu temple of Prambanan near Yogyakarta, where the torch's flame from India were fused together with an Indonesian natural eternal flame taken from Mrapen, Central Java. Subsequently, a concert was performed marking the start of torch relay throughout the country.

The relay finished on 15 August in Jakarta. In 17 August during the independence day of Indonesia the flame was stored in the National Monument, before being carried into the opening ceremony at Gelora Bung Karno Stadium on 18 August.

== Route in Indonesia ==
Date	Map
19 July (day 1): Yogyakarta; 19 July (day 1): Mrapen; 19 July (day 1): Simpang Lima; 19 July (day 1): Prambanan; 19 July (day 1): Solo; 20 July (day 2): Blitar; 20 July (day 2): Kepanjen; 20 July (day 2): Malang; 21 July (day 3): Bromo; 21 July (day 3): Probolinggo; 22 July (day 4): Situbondo; 22 July (day 4): Bondowoso; 22 July (day 4): Banyuwangi	2018 Asian Games torch relay is located in Java
23 July (day 5): Gilimanuk; 23 July (day 5): Kuta; 23 July (day 5): Denpasar; 23 July (day 5): Garuda Wisnu Kencana; 24 July (day 6): Mataram	2018 Asian Games torch relay is located in Lesser Sunda Islands
25 July (day 7): Not travelling, staying in Mataram
26 July (day 8): Raja Ampat; 27 July (day 9): Sorong	2018 Asian Games torch relay is located in Western New Guinea
28 July (day 10): Tanjung Bira; 29 July (day 11): Makassar	2018 Asian Games torch relay is located in Sulawesi
30 July (day 12): Banjarmasin	2018 Asian Games torch relay is located in Kalimantan
31 July (day 13): Banda Aceh; 31 July (day 13): Lake Toba; 1 August (day 14): Pekanbaru; 2 August (day 15): Bukittinggi; 3 August (day 16): Jambi; 4 August (day 17): Palembang; 5 August (day 18): Banyuasin; 5 August (day 18): Pematang; 6 August (day 19): Prabumulih; 7 August (day 20): Jakabaring Sport City; 7 August (day 20): Ogan Ilir; 8 August (day 21): Bandar Lampung	2018 Asian Games torch relay is located in Sumatra
9 August (day 22): Serang; 10 August (day 23): Purwakarta; 11 August (day 24): Bandung; 12 August (day 25): Garut; 13 August (day 26): Cianjur; 14 August (day 27): Bogor; 15 August (day 28): Jakarta; 18 August (day 29): Gelora Bung Karno Stadium	2018 Asian Games torch relay is located in Java

== See also ==
- 2018 Asian Para Games#Torch relay
