= National Narcotics Board =

Indonesian government agency

- Badan Narkotika Nasional
- Seal of the National Narcotics Board

Agency overview
- Formed: 2002
- Jurisdiction: Government of Indonesia
- Headquarters: MT. Haryono No. 11 St. Cawang, East Jakarta, Indonesia
- Agency executive: Head of BNN
- Website: www.bnn.go.id www.stopnarkoba.com

The National Narcotics Board or National Narcotics Agency (Indonesian: Badan Narkotika Nasional, abbreviated BNN) is a government agency of Indonesia. BNN is responsible for minimizing the abuse of controlled substances through prevention and law enforcement measures directed primarily at illegal drug abuse and drug trafficking.

== Organizational structure ==
BNN is led by the Head of BNN. The Head of BNN is always an active police officer, however civil servants are allowed to be the Head of BNN. The Head of BNN reports directly to the president and coordinates with the chief of national police.

BNN organization is consist of:

- Head of BNN
- Main Secretariat
- Deputy of Prevention
- Deputy of Community Empowerment
- Deputy of Eradication
- Deputy of Rehabilitation
- Deputy of Legal Affairs and Cooperation
- Main Inspectorate
- Research, Data and Information Center
- Human Resource Development Center
- Narcotics Laboratory
  - Narcotics Board Regional Office (Province level)
  - Narcotics Board Regional Office (City/Regency level)

== Weapons ==
BNN officers are trained in the use of firearms.

Model	Origin	Type	Reference
Heckler & Koch P30	Germany	Semi-automatic pistol	
CZ P-07	Czech Republic	Semi-automatic pistol	
Saiga-12S EXP-01	Russia	Shotgun	
