= Colonial architecture in Surabaya =

Architectural style native to Dutch East Indies era

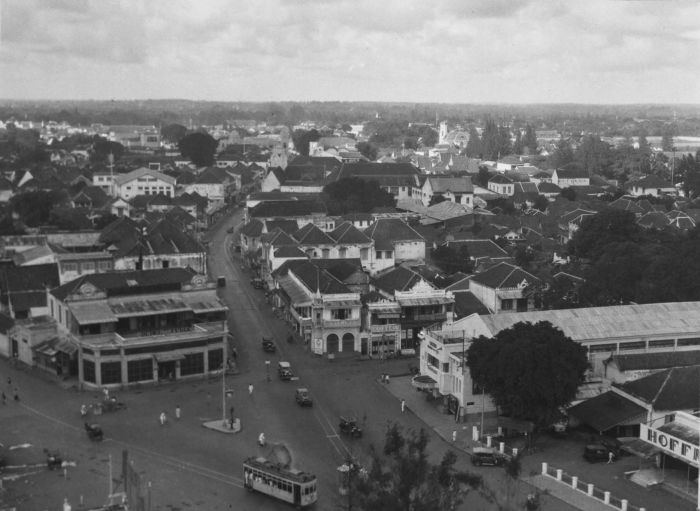
Pasar Besar (market area) circa 1930

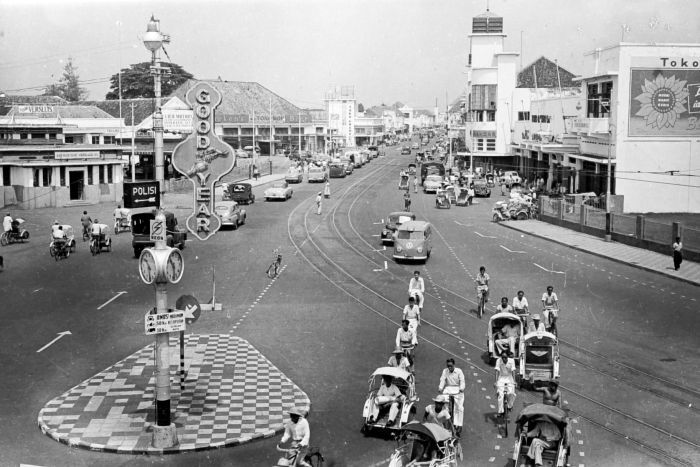
Toendjoengan (1953)

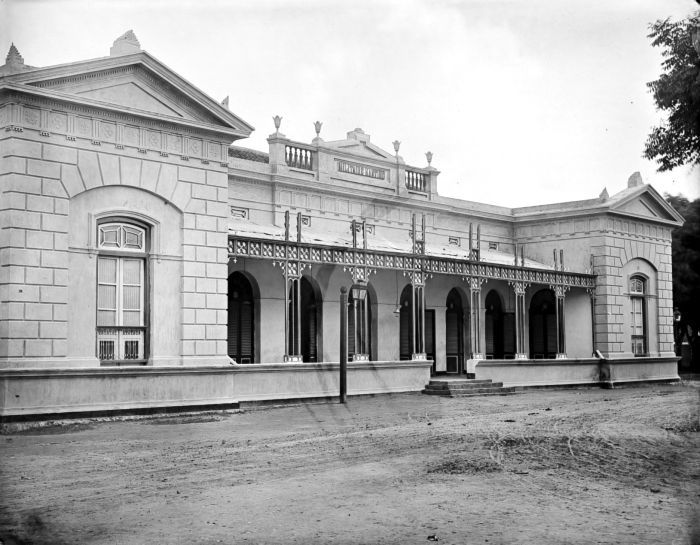
Military canteen in Surabaya

Colonial architecture in Surabaya (Dutch: Soerabaja) includes the legacy of neoclassical architecture and Dutch architecture built during the Dutch East Indies era. Kota Lama (transl. Old City) in Surabaya is a tourist attraction but faces problems with the deterioration of older buildings. It includes Dutch architecture, has an Arab quarter and areas exhibiting Chinese influence. Jembatan Merah is an area known for its Dutch architecture.

Cosman Citroen designed a city hall in 1916 and planned the area of Ketabang. Museum Bank Indonesia, Surabaya is located in the former Bank of Java branch building. The House of Sampoerna is a museum devoted to the history of clove cigarette (kretek) manufacturing in Indonesia and is housed in a Dutch colonial building (originally an orphanage) dating to 1864.

For many years after Indonesia became independent, the colonial buildings in the Old City were ignored. By the mid-2020s, however, that neighbourhood had come to be seen as key to boosting the city's economy by attracting tourists. In July 2024, the city formally launched a revitalised Old City, and within a few months city officials were pleased with the outcome of the revitalisation.

Even though a majority of Surabayans have negative views about the Dutch colonial era, they do admire the old buildings the colonists left behind. Volunteers have turned out in droves to clean up the Old City, and young Indonesians now flock to the area for the cultural experience, or to take the perfect Instagram photo. Perhaps Indonesian researchers will benefit from the book "Indische Bouwkunst" . This lists more than 2000 projects built between 1900 and 1958 – many of which in Surabaya- , as well as over 150 architects who designed them. This book has been translated into Bahasa Indonesia and is available as a free download.

== Gallery ==
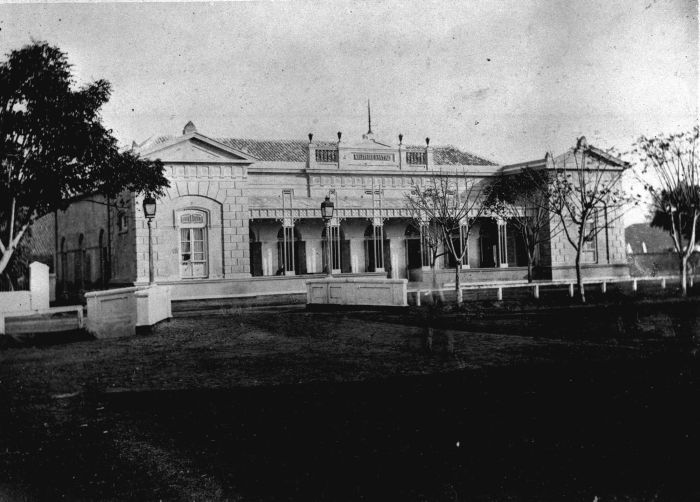
Bijeenkomsthuis (meeting house)

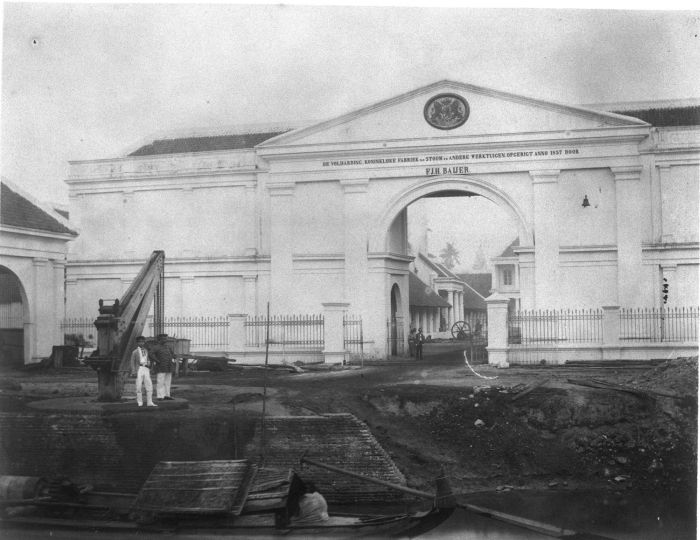
Entrance portal of "De ingangspoort" (Perseverance), Royal Factory Steam and other machines in the year 1857 by F.J.H. Baijer

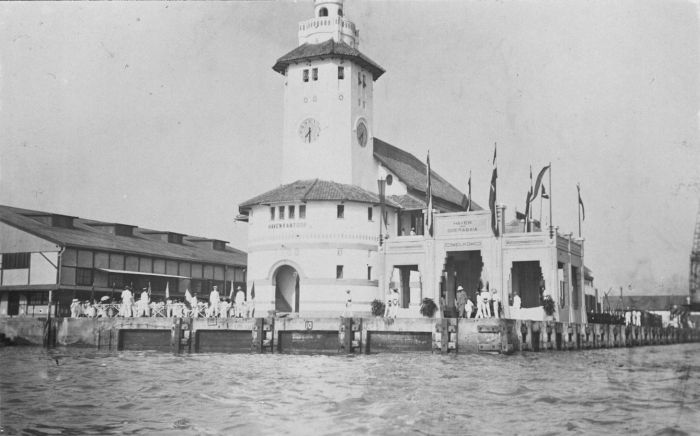
Harbor office in Surabaya and memorial on the occasion of the visit of Governor General Fock (September, 1922)

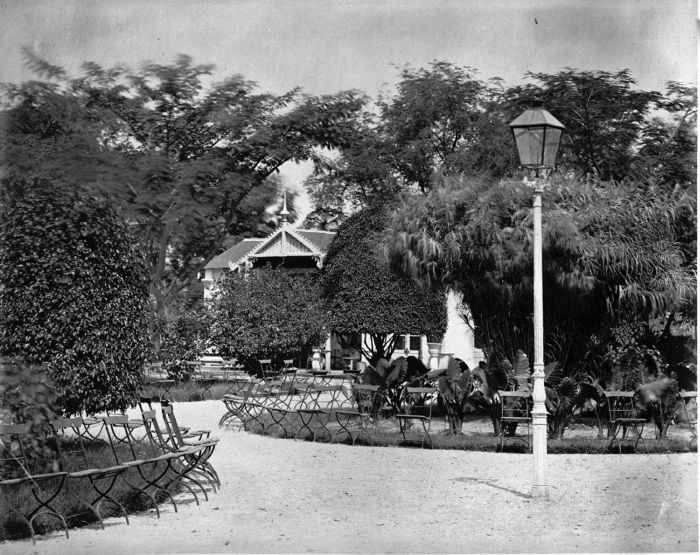
City garden (late 19th century)

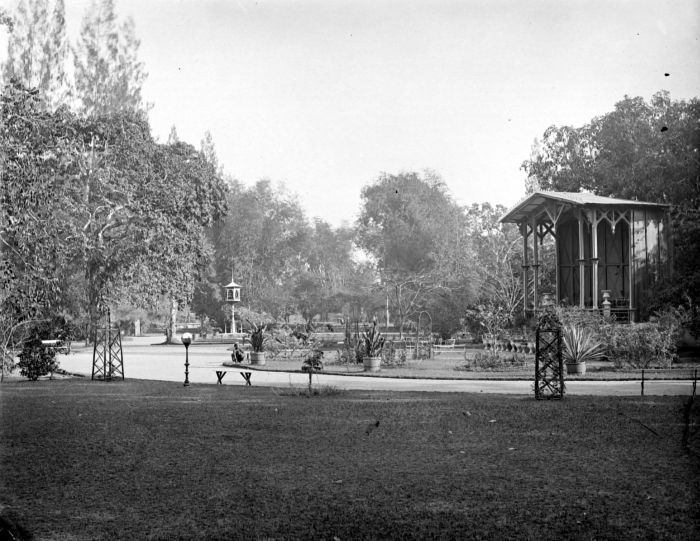
Garden in Surabaya

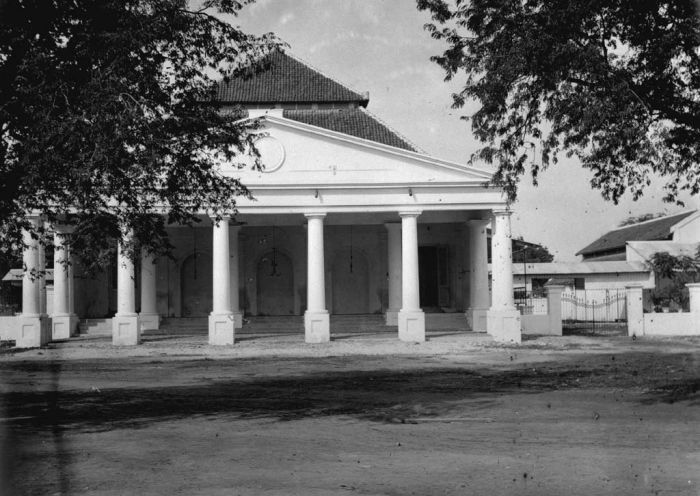
"Komediegebouw" Surabaya

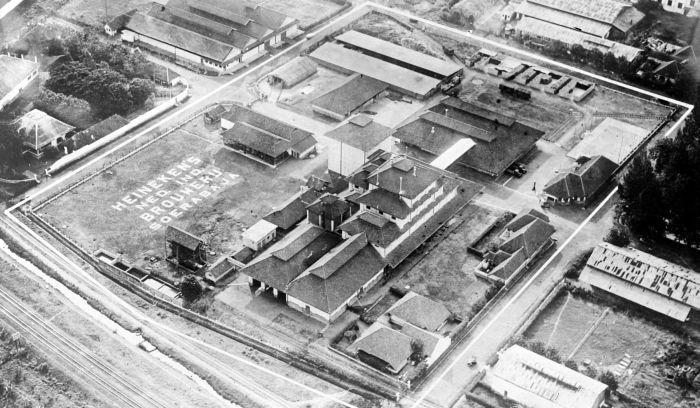
Heineken Brewery in Surabaya

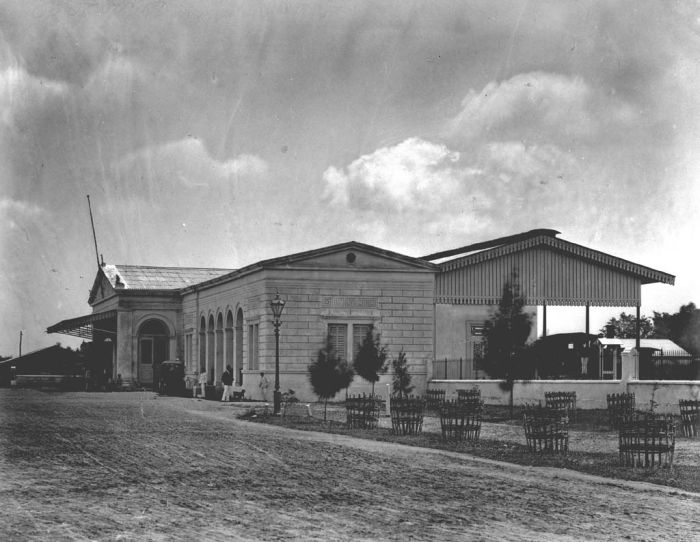
Goebang train station (Surabaya Gubeng railway station)

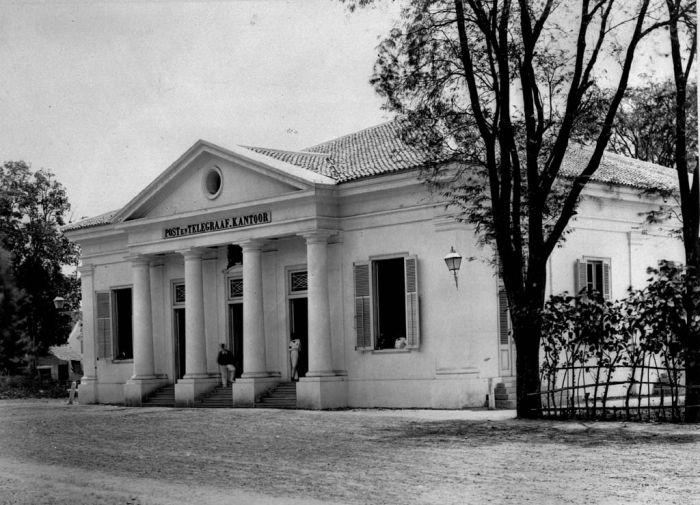
Post and Telegraph office

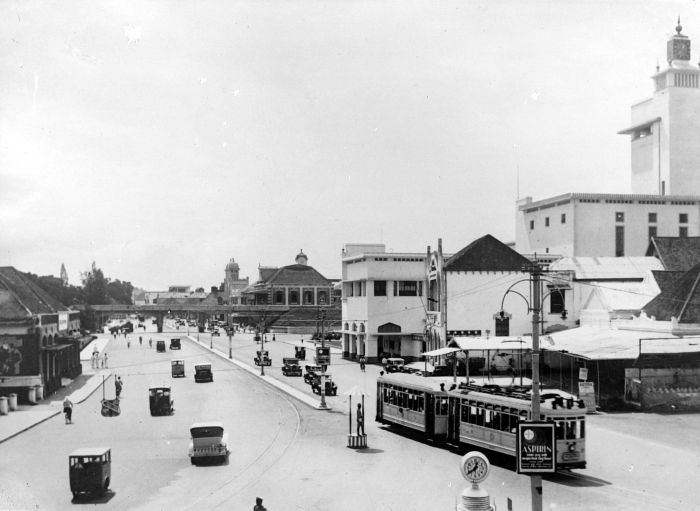
Pasar Besar in the background

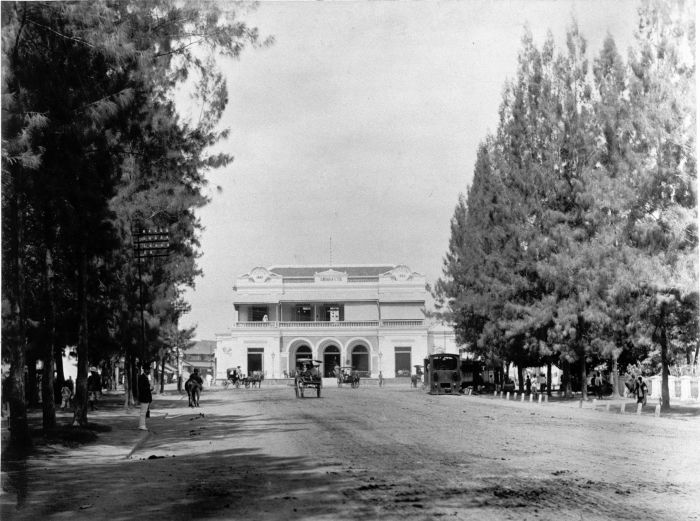
Grimm & Co. "cake palace" at Pasar Besar

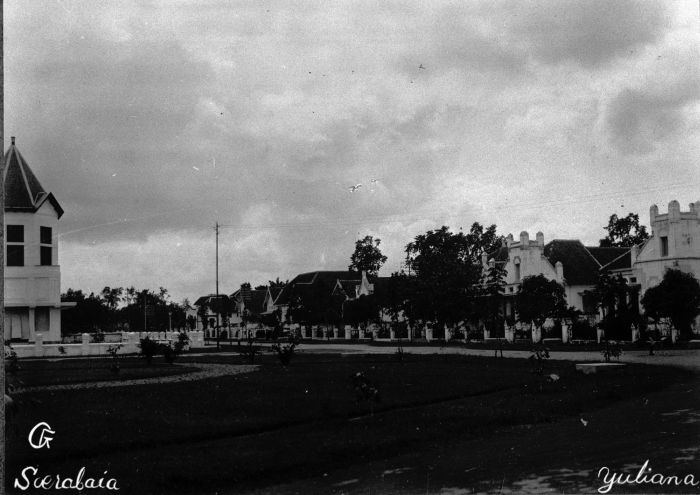
Goebang (now Gubeng district)

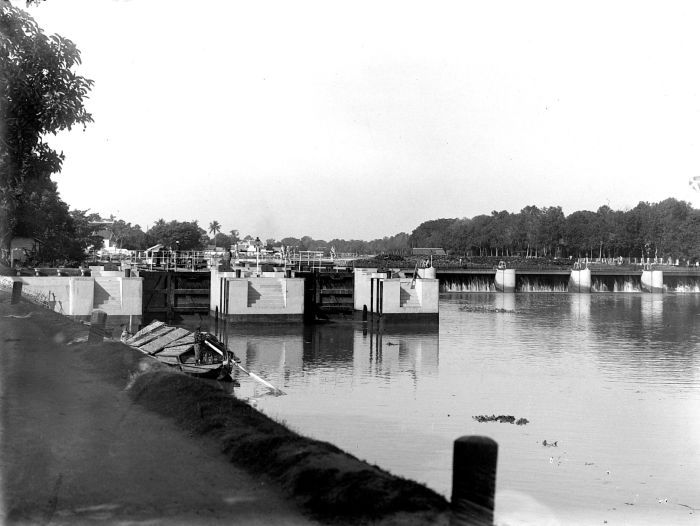
Sluice

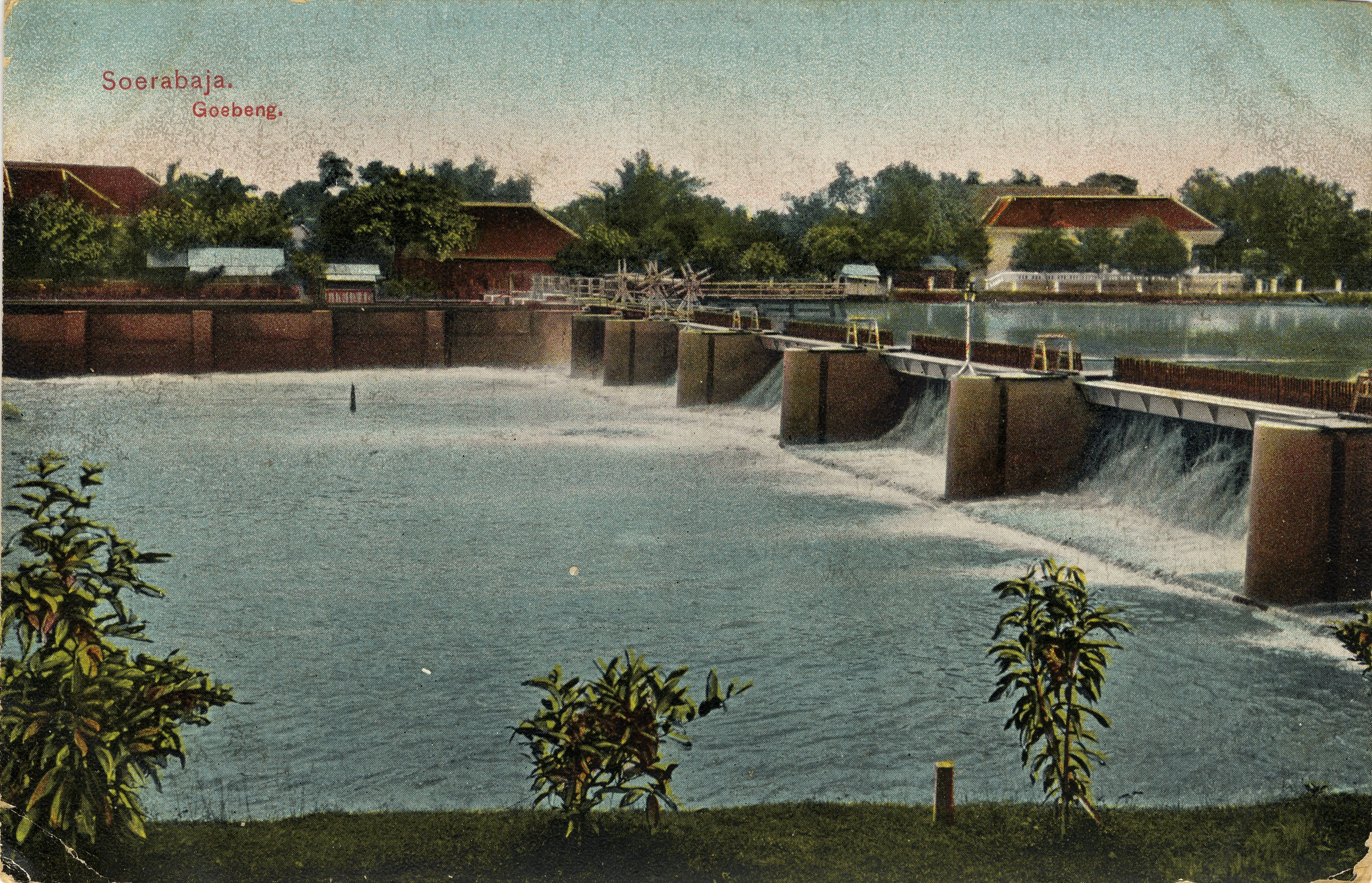
Postcard of sluice

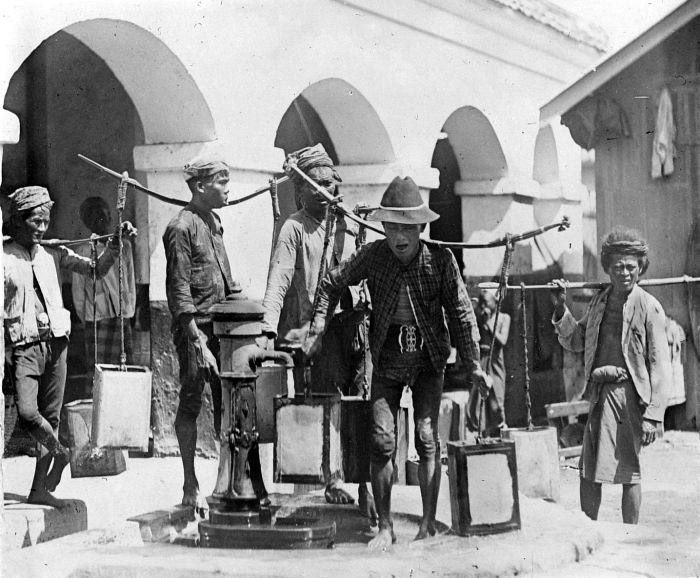
Fountain and water carriers

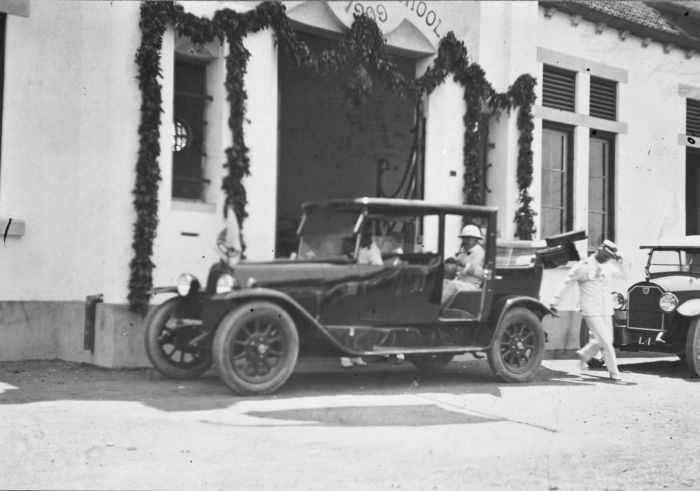
Governor General Fock visiting a school

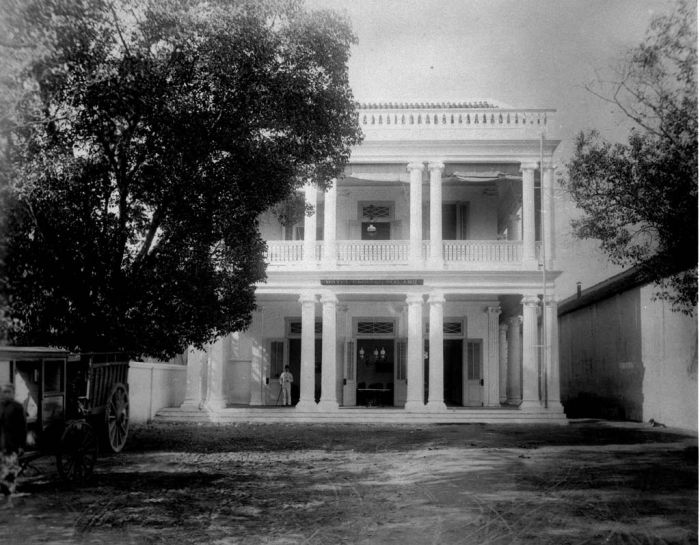
Hotel Embong Malang

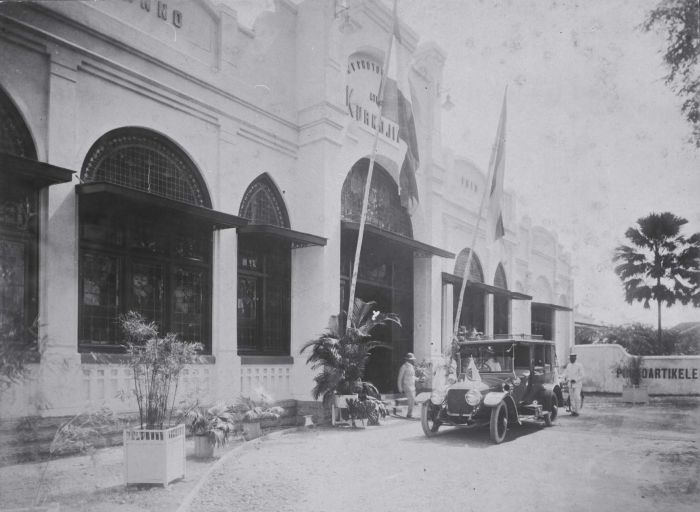
Kurkdjian photo studio (O. Kurkdjian & Co.)

== List of buildings ==
Last official name	Former names	Year	Architect	Location	Latest image	Oldest image
Apotik Simpang	De Simpangsche Apotheek; Toko Occasion and Toko Atal Sport	1855 (first building); 1936 (second building)	Herman Smeets (first building); Henri Estourgie (second building)	7°15′47″S 112°44′28″E		
Balai Kota Surabaya	Gemeentehuis te Soerabaja / Raadhuis te Soerabaja / Stadhuis te Soerabaja	1927	Cosman Citroen	7°15′33″S 112°44′50″E		
Balai Pemuda / Alun-Alun Surabaya	Simpang Club or Simpangsche Societeit	1907	Willem Westmaas sr.	7°15′50″S 112°44′26″E		
Gedung Algemeene / Gedung Singa / Gedung Aperdi	Kantoor Algemeene	1901	Hendrik Petrus Berlage	7°14′14″S 112°44′16″E		
Gedung Bank Mandiri KC Surabaya Niaga	Kantoorgebouw van Borsumij; Gedung Bank Exim	1935	Cosman Citroen	7°14′22″S 112°44′16″E		
Gedung Bank Mandiri KCP Surabaya Jembatan Merah	Kantoor Nederlandsch-Indische Handelsbank	1912	George Elenbaas and Pieter Moojen	7°14′13″S 112°44′16″E		
Gedung Bank Mandiri KCP Surabaya Pahlawan	Kantoorgebouw Firma Lindeteves-Stokvis Soerabaia / Kihatama Butai / Glinding Tipis;	1911–1913	Eduard Cuypers	7°14′37″S 112°44′20″E		
Gedung BNI KCP Jembatan Merah Surabaya	Kantoorgebouw van Borsumij	1920	Cosman Citroen and Jan Jacob Job	7°14′09″S 112°44′12″E		
Gedung Cerutu / Gedung Cigar	Java Sugar Syndicate; Bridgestone; Kantor Said bin Oemar Bagil; Kantor Bank Bumi Daya; Bank Mandiri	1916	N.V. Maatschappij Tot Exploitatie Van Het Bureau Gebroeders Knaud	7°14′12″S 112°44′13″E		
Gedung DPMPTSP Jawa Timur	Meubelmagazijn Pröttel; Kantoor Surabaiasch Handelsblad; Kantor Suara Asia; Gedung Brantas; Kantor Harian Memorandum; Kantor Catatan Sipil Kota Surabaya; Kantor Dinas Perumahan Surabaya; Gedung Penanaman Modal (BPM) Jawa Timur	1912 or 1920	unknown	7°14′40″S 112°44′20″E		
Gedung Grahadi	Residentiehuis / Tuinhuis	1795 (constructed); 1810 (renovated)		7°15′46″S 112°44′36″E		
Gedung Maybank	Nederlands Spaarbank; Nutsspaarbank; Bank Tabungan; Bank Internasional Indonesia	1917	Fritz Joseph Pinédo, Jan Jacob Job	7°14′17″S 112°44′14″E		
Gedung Siola / Surabaya Museum	Whiteaway Laidlaw & Co; Het Engelsche Warenhuis; Chiyoda Store; SIOLA; Ramayana Siola	Unclear; (Note: Numerous sources claim that the Siola Building was constructed in 1877. However, reliable sources state that that is the year that co-founder Robert Laidlaw moved to India, that the business of Whiteaway Laidlaw & Co was not founded until 1882, and that it initially operated department stores in India, not the Dutch East Indies. See the sources cited in the articles about the co-founder and the business.) possibly 1923		7°15′32″S 112°44′20″E		
Gereja Kelahiran Santa Perawan Maria	Onze Lieve Vrouw Geboorte Kerk / Onze Lieve Vrouwekerk	1899–1900	Willem Westmaas sr. and Muljono Widjosastro	7°14′31″S 112°44′13″E		
Holycow x coffee toffee	Kantor Pos Pembantu Simpang; Post shop coffee toffee	1932	G.P.J.M. Bolsius and Landsgebouwdienst	7°15′50″S 112°44′36″E		
Hotel Majapahit	Oranje Hotel; Hotel Yamato; Hotel Merdeka; L. M. S. Hotel; Mandarin Oriental Hotel Majapahit	1911 front building 1934	Alfred Bidwell Robert Deppe, Job & Sprey, frontbuilding	7°15′37″S 112°44′23″E		
Horison Arcadia Heritage Surabaya	Kantoor Geo Wehry; Hotel Ibis Rajawali	1913–1914	Marius Hulswit	7°14′11″S 112°44′12″E		
Kantor Gubernur Jawa Timur	Gouverneurskantoor van Oost-Java (incl. Residentiekantoor) or Gouverneurs Kantoor and Residentie Kantoor; Syuucho (Residency) Office	1929–1931	Wijnand Lemei Jnr, assisted by Hubert Albert Breuning and WB Carmiggelt (Landsgebouwendienst)	7°14′45″S 112°44′21″E		
Kantor Partai PDI	Kantoor Internationale Crediet- en Handelsvereeniging "Rotterdam"; Gedung Internatio	1927–1931	Frans Ghijsels	7°14′09″S 112°44′14″E		
Kantor Pertamina EP Asset 4	Sociëteit Concordia; Kantoor Bataafche Petroleum Maatschappij (BPM); Kantor Pertamina UPDN V	1843 (constructed); 1917–1918 (renovated)	JP Emerling (construction); Cosman Citroen (1917–1918 renovation)	7°14′31″S 112°44′18″E		
Kantor PTPN X	Koloniale Bank	1927–1928	Charles Prosper Wolff Schoemaker	7°14′16″S 112°44′14″E		
Kantor PTPN XI / Kantor Pusat PTPN XI	Kantoor van de Handelsvereeniging Amsterdam; Kantor PPN; Kantor PTPN	1925	Eduard Cuypers	7°14′17″S 112°44′05″E		
Kantor telepon Surabaya Utara / Kantor Telkom Garuda	Kantor Tilpun Utara	1913–1914	Frans Ghijsels	7°14′06″S 112°44′13″E		
Locaāhands	Boekhandel J.W.F. Sluyter Soerabaja; Van Dorp & Co; Toko Aneka Dharma; a car showroom; Bank Dagang Negara; Bank Bumi Daya/PT. Saver; Kantor Yayasan Majelis Dzikir Surabaya "Nurussalam"	1925		7°15′31″S 112°44′20″E		
Monumen Pers Perjuangan Surabaya / Media Center PJI-Monumen Pers / Gedung Seiko	Simpangsche Bazaar; De Fikkert Motorcar; Piccolo Club; Toko Nam; Toko Kwang; Kantor Antara	1886 (became store); 1904 (renovated); 1938 (demolished and rebuilt)	Cor de Graaf (design 1921) Bruno Nobile de Vistarini (design 1938)	7°15′39″S 112°44′22″E		
Museum Bank Indonesia Surabaya	De Javasche Bank; Bank Indonesia	1829 (constructed); 1904 (demolished and rebuilt); 1910 (renovated)	Eduard Cuypers (1912 new building)	7°14′07″S 112°44′13″E		
Pintu Air Jagir / Dam Jagir / Banjir Sluis		1916–1923 (constructed); 1978 (renovated)	HW Vrijlandt	7°18′02″S 112°44′28″E		
Pos Bloc Surabaya	Hoofkantoor Soerabaja; Kantor Pos Besar Surabaya; Kantor Pos Besar Kebonrojo	1928	G.P.J.M. Bolsius and BOW (Burgerlijke Openbare Werken)	7°14′34″S 112°44′15″E		
Toko Savelkoul	Savelkoul-winkels en andere	1935	Robert Deppe, Job & Sprey	7°15′42″S 112°44′26″E		
Varna Culture Hotel	Magazijn Begeer van Kempen en Vos; Militaire kantine Koninklijke Marine; Kantor BCA KCP Tunjungan	1917–1919	Cosman Citroen	7°15′34″S 112°44′21″E		

== See also ==
- Colonial architecture of Indonesia
- Colonial architecture of Jakarta
