= Grimm & Co. =

Grimm & Co. may refer to:

- Grimm & Co. (restaurant), restaurant and dance hall opened in 1888 in Surabaya, Indonesia
- Grimm & Co. (writing organisation), non-profit creative writing organisation founded in 2016, based in Rotherham, South Yorkshire

== See also ==
- Grimm (disambiguation)
