= Grim =

Grim may refer to:

== People ==
- Grim (surname)
- Myron "Grim" Natwick (1890–1990), American artist, animator and film director best known for drawing Betty Boop
- Grim (Erik Brødreskift) (died 1999), Norwegian drummer for the band Immortal

== Mythical or fictional characters ==
- Grim, Old Norse Grímr, from the Norse saga Gríms saga loðinkinna
- The name of two brothers and two drinking horns in the short Icelandic saga Helga þáttr Þórissonar
- Church grim, a spectral black dog
  - The Grim, an omen of death in the form of a black dog in the novel, film and game Harry Potter and the Prisoner of Azkaban
- Fossegrim, a Norwegian water spirit also called "the grim"
- The title character of Grim the Collier of Croydon, a play of uncertain authorship first published in 1662
- Grim (Billy & Mandy), from the animated television series The Grim Adventures of Billy & Mandy
- A character from the Japanese visual novel Chaos;Head

== Places ==
- Grim, Vest-Agder, a borough in Kristiansand, Norway
- Grim Rock, off the coast of Graham Land, Antarctica
- Grim Township, Michigan
- Grim's Ditch or Dyke, many places in Great Britain referring to prehistoric or Roman earthworks attributed to Woden
- Cape Grim, a cape in Tasmania, Australia
- The Grim, a colloquial name for the North-West Frontier region in north-west Pakistan and south-eastern Afghanistan; see Military history of the North-West Frontier

== Music ==
- GRIM (Groupe de recherche et d'improvisation musicales), Marseille, France, a non-profit institute for improvised and experimental music
- Grim, a former name of Montenegrin rock group Grimm (band)
- Grim (musical), a 2014 British stage musical
- Grim (Ass Ponys album), 1992
- Grim (Dark Sarah album), 2020

== Film ==
- Grim (film), a 1996 horror film

== See also ==
- List of people known as the Grim
- GRIM test, a simple statistical test used to identify inconsistencies in the analysis of granular data sets
- Grim trigger, a strategy in game theory
- Grimm (disambiguation)
- Grim Reaper, a personification of death
- Grímr, a name of the Norse god Odin (see List of names of Odin)
