= Grimnir =

Grimnir may refer to:

- One of Odin's names, specifically the one he uses in Grímnismál (Sayings of Grímnir), see list of names of Odin
- A character in the children's novel, The Weirdstone of Brisingamen
- An "ancestor god" of the dwarfs in Warhammer Fantasy
- A fictional terrorist group that serves as the main antagonists of the Front Mission 5

== See also ==
- Grim (disambiguation)
- Grim (surname)
- Grimnitzsee
