= Grimm (surname) =

Grimm is a surname of German origin. Notable people with the surname include:

- Alexander Grimm (born 1986), German slalom canoeist
- Alfred Grimm (1943–2026), German object artist, sculptor, painter and draftsman
- Brothers Grimm, German linguists
  - Jacob Grimm (1785–1863), German philologist, jurist and mythologist
  - Wilhelm Grimm (1786–1859), German author, the younger of the Brothers Grimm
- Carl Hugo Grimm (1890–1978), American composer
- Charlie Grimm (1898–1983), American baseball player and manager
- Christi Grimm, American politician
- Christoph Grimm (born 1957), German politician
- Christopher Grimm, American writer, director, and actor
- Christopher Grimm (politician) (1828–1895), American businessman and politician
- Cindy Grimm, American computer scientist, roboticist, and mechanical engineer
- Claus Grimm (born 1940), art historian, cataloger of the works of Frans Hals
- Constantin de Grimm (1845–1896), Russian-born artist
- Georg Grimm (1846–1887), German painter, designer and decorator
- George Grimm (1859–1945), American politician and judge
- George Grimm (Presbyterian minister) (1833–1897) Australian Presbyterian minister in New South Wales
- Hans Grimm (1875–1959), extreme right-wing German writer
- Julius Otto Grimm (1827–1903), German composer and conductor
- Justin Grimm (born 1988), American baseball player
- Luke Grimm (born 2001), American football player
- MF Grimm (born 1970), American musician and comic book writer
- Marco Grimm (born 1972), German football player
- Friedrich Melchior, Baron von Grimm (1723–1807), German-born French author and encyclopedist
- Michael Grimm (disambiguation), multiple people
- Robert Grimm (1881–1958), Swiss socialist politician
- Rudolf Grimm (born 1961), Austrian experimental physicist
- Russ Grimm (born 1959), American football player
- Samuel Hieronymus Grimm (1733–1794), Swiss artist
- Silke Grimm (born 1967), German politician
- Veronika Grimm (born 1971), German economist
- Warren Grimm (1888–1919), victim of the Centralia Massacre
- Wendelin Grimm (1818–1890), American farmer

== Fictional characters ==
- Benjamin Grimm, a superhero better known as The Thing

== See also ==
- Grimm (disambiguation)
- Grim (surname)
