= The Book of Unusual Treasures =

Tabletop fantasy role-playing game supplement

- Publishers: Bad Axe Games
- Publication: 2003; 23 years ago
- Genres: Fantasy Horror Science fiction
- Systems: d20 System

The Book of Unusual Treasures is a 2003 supplement for d20 System role-playing games published by Bad Axe Games.

== Contents ==
The Book of Unusual Treasures is a supplement in which spellbooks, monster‑harvested components, masterwork arms, and crafted relics are catalogued in detail.

== Reviews ==
- Pyramid
- Backstab
- Fictional Reality (Issue 16 - Jun 2004)

== See also ==
- Heroes of High Favor: Dwarves
- Grim Tales (Bad Axe Games)
