= Brothers Grimm (disambiguation) =

The Brothers Grimm were German academics who together collected and published folklore.

Brothers Grimm may also refer to:

- The Brothers Grimm (film), a 2005 fantasy adventure film
- Brothers Grimm (comics), Marvel Comics supervillains
- Brothers Grimm (album), a 2008 album by Drapht
- Brothers Grim (band), a Russian pop-rock group
- Brothers Grym, an American hip-hop group
- "Brothers Grimm", an All Grown Up! episode
- The Wonderful World of the Brothers Grimm, a 1962 American biographical fantasy film

== See also ==
- Grimm (disambiguation)
- Grimsby (film), released as The Brothers Grimsby in North America, a 2016 spy action comedy film
