= Grimm Tales =

Grimm Tales, or variants, may refer to:

- Grimms' Fairy Tales, a collection of fairy tales by the Brothers Grimm
- Grimm Fairy Tales (comics), a dark fantasy comic book series
- Grimm Tales (album), by Nox Arcana, 2008
- Grimm Tales (play), by Carol Ann Duffy, 1996
- Grim Tales, a British children's television program
- Grim Tales (Bad Axe Games), a 2004 role-playing game supplement

== See also ==
- Grimm (disambiguation)
