= Wirawiri Suroboyo =

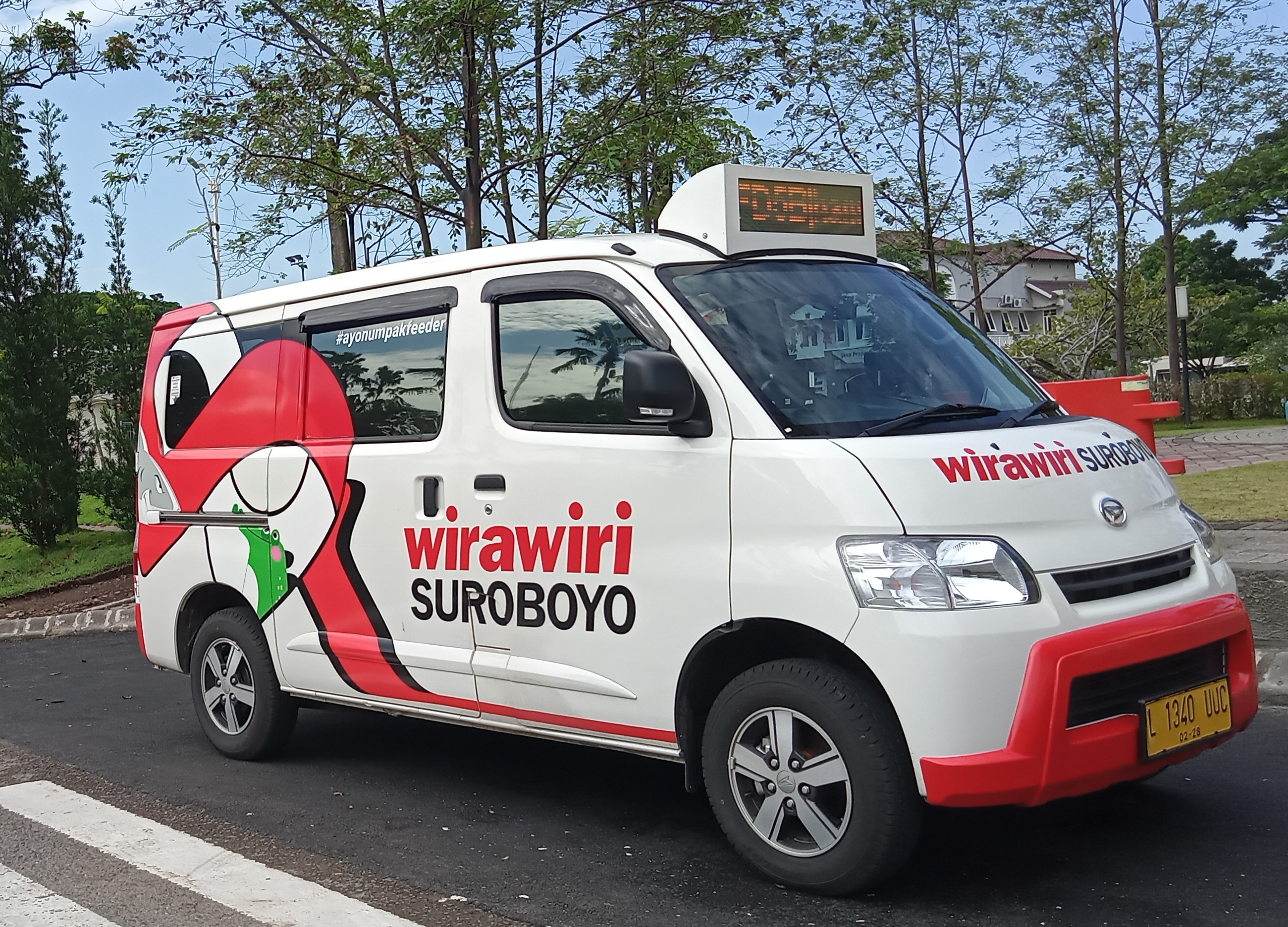

Overview
- Owner: Government of Surabaya
- Area served: Surabaya
- Transit type: Feeder Service; Minibuses
- Number of lines: 12 Corridors
- Line number: FD02, FD03, FD04, FD05, FD06, FD07, FD08, FD09, FD10, FD11, FD12, FD13

Operation
- Operator: Suroboyo Bus
- Headway: 15-30 minutes

Wirawiri Suroboyo is a feeder transit service integrated with Suroboyo Bus in Surabaya, Indonesia.

Wirawiri Suroboyo operates small, 10-16 seat minibuses, with routes that funnel passengers to Suroboyo Bus corridors, as well as areas not serviced by Suroboyo Bus. Wirawiri Suroboyo unita are also staffed with helpers that assist the driver with fare collection and passenger wayfinding.

As with Suroboyo Bus, the service is run by the local Department of Transportation of Surabaya. The system partly uses a buy-the-service scheme, where the government pays for each kilometer traveled by the operator of the lines.

== Routes ==
Current transport map of all modes of transport in Surabaya; includes Wirawiri Suroboyo

At present, Wirawiri Suroboyo operates 12 routes.

- FD02 - PNR Mayjend Sungkono - Balai Kota
- FD03 - TIJ - Gunung Anyar Market
- FD04 - SIER - Kota Lama
- FD05 - PNR Mayjend Sungkono - Puspa Raya
- FD06 - TIJ - Lakarsantri
- FD07 - Bratang Terminal - Surabaya Pasar Turi Station
- FD08 - TOW - Unesa
- FD09 - Menanggal Terminal - Manukan Terminal
- FD10 - Keputih Terminal - Bunguran
- FD11 - Bratang Terminal - Bulak Shelter
- FD12 - Purabaya Terminal - Kenpark
- FD13 - RSUD Eka Candraini - RSUD dr. Mohammad Soewandhie

FD03 and FD08 run alternate, extended routes during Saturday and Sunday. FD03 extends to Gunung Anyar Mangrove Park, and FD08 extends to Adventureland Romokalisari.

=== Route Alterations ===
- FD01 was launched with a route that was run to the entrance of Gelora Bung Tomo, before it was altered to extend into Sumberrejo on 29 July 2023. FD01 then was upgraded to a Suroboyo Bus route at November 15 2025.
- FD02 was launched with a route that ended in Embong Wungu. On 9 March 2023, the route was extended, and now terminates in Balaikota. FD02 was also altered to run through Kupang Segunting street on 24 October 2024
- FD03 was launched with a route that ended in Kedung Asem, with an accompanying FD04 that connected at the terminus of FD03 to extend towards Gunung Anyar. On 29 July 2023, FD04 was merged into FD03, with the merged FD04 routing being altered to bypass Wonorejo and Medokan Ayu.
- FD04 was formerly a route that ran from Kedung Asem to Gunung Anyar. After FD03 and FD04 was merged, the route number sat dormant, before being reactivated in 23 September serving SIER - Kota Lama.
- FD05 was launched with a route that started in Mayjend. HR Muhammad street and passed through Pattimura street, before it was altered to bypass Pattimura and go through Darmo Permai III street at 19 May 2023. It was eventually extended from HR. Muhammad to PNR Mayjend Sungkono at 1 March 2024.
- FD05 was also launched with a routing that turned straight into Pradah Indah street, before it was extended to Bundaran PTC on 12 August 2023. It was then extended to Mayjend Jono Soewojo street on 1 March 2024. From 8 January 2026, FD05 bypasses the Bundaran PTC extension on the return route (FD05B) to PNR Mayjend Sungkono.
- At the terminus of FD05, it initially went through Univesitas Ciputra and UC Loop, before the routing was cut short to Puspa Raya on 1 March 2023. The route was re-extended through UC Loop on 13 October 2024. The route was further extended to RSUD Bakti Dharma Husada starting 8 January, 2026.
- FD07 formerly launched with a route that ended just short of Surabaya Pasar Turi station. The route was extended to enter Surabaya Pasar Turi on 12 August 2023.
- FD08 was formerly a Suroboyo Bus route that operated from TIJ to TOW. The route was then downgraded to a Wirawiri route then split up into FD06 (TIJ-Lakarsantri) and FD08 (UNESA-TOW).
- FD12 was launched on 1 January 2026 after taking over the former route of Trans Semanggi Suroboyo corridor 3L

== Fleet ==
At present, Wirawiri Suroboyo operates a mix of Daihatsu Gran Max's and Toyota Hiace's that have been converted by Sugity Creatives.

Starting October 27, Wirawiri Surboyo introduced 16 Diesel Microbuses to serve route FD6.

== Payment and Integration ==
Wirawiri Suroboyo accepts payments via QRIS and electronic payment cards. QRIS Tap and GOBIS tickets may be accepted in certain lines. Wirawiri Suroboyo follows Suroboyo Bus' fares of IDR 5,000 for the general public and IDR 2,500 for students.

== History ==
The concept of a feeder service that is integrated with the existing Suroboyo Bus service has been proposed since mid 2022 as a replacement for city angkot lines. Initially, 36 units were allocated by the end of 2022, and unit allocation increased to 52 by 2023.

Wirawiri Suroboyo was launched on the 3rd of March, 2023. It was launched with 5 lines. It initially had 14 Hiace units seating 14 passengers, and 38 Grand Max units seating 10 passengers.

During the 2024 ASEAN U-19 Boys Championship in Surabaya, Wirawiri Suroboyo minibuses were provided as a free shuttle service between TIJ and Gelora Bung Tomo stadium.

== Incidents ==
- At 19 September, 2024, a Wirawiri Gran Max unit serving corridor FD03 plunged into the Gunung Anyar river in between Medokan Sawah Timur and UPNVJT. The driver was purportedly conducting an evasive maneuver after a motorcyclist had cut in front of the minibus. The driver suffered minor injuries, whilst three other passengers did not suffer any.
- During the August 2025 Indonesian protests, multiple Wirawiri Suroboyo lines had to be redirected and eventually halted prematurely before 20.35 WIB on August 29. Service resumed normally on August 30.
