= Balai Pemuda =

Building in Surabaya

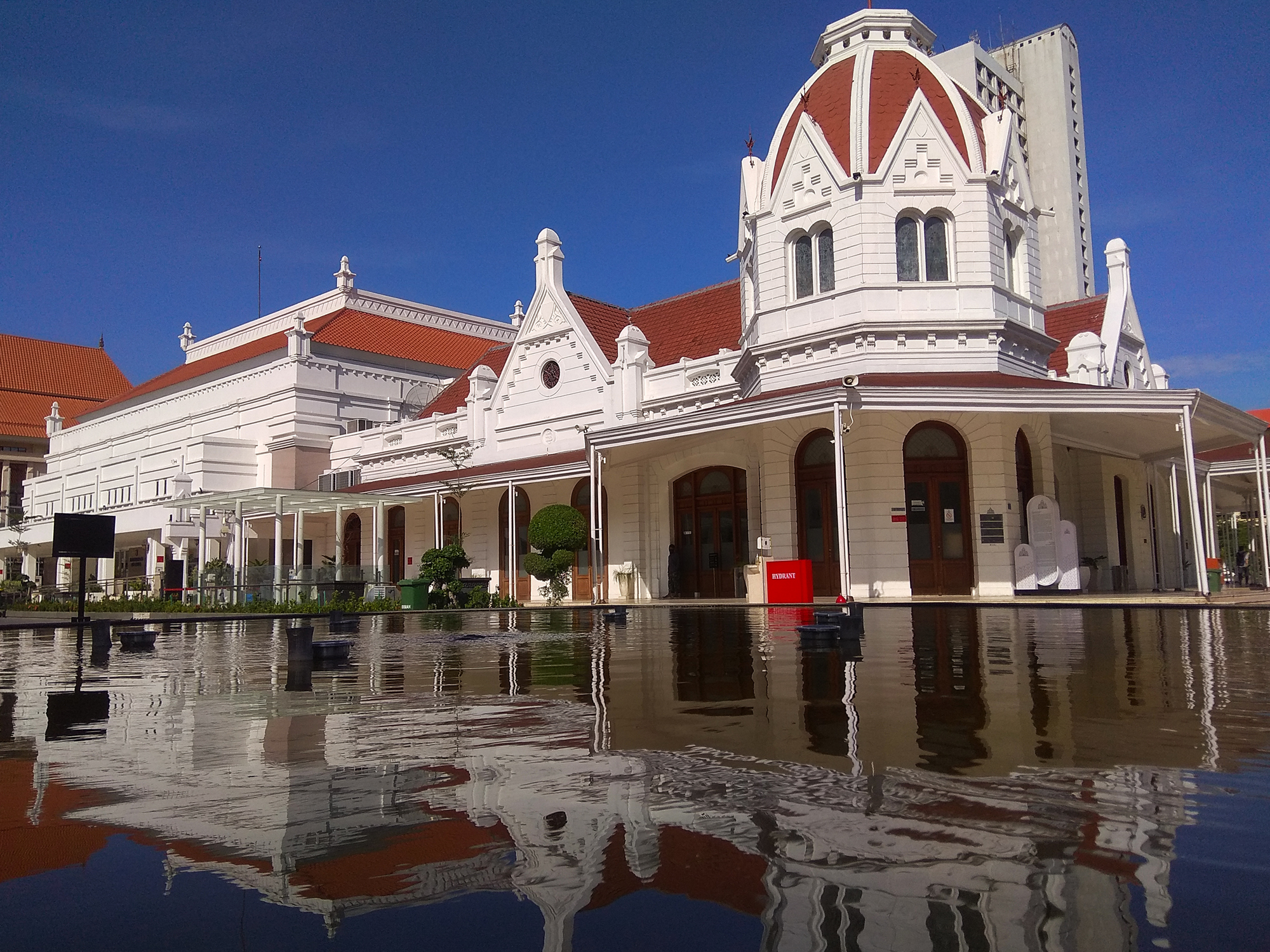
- Balai Pemuda in 2020
- Interactive map of the Balai Pemuda area
- Former names: Simpangsche Societeit or Simpangsche Club

General information
- Architectural style: New Indies Style, Dutch Rationalism, Neo Renaissance
- Location: Jalan Suryo No.15, Surabaya, Indonesia
- Coordinates: 7.2639219°S 112.74529300566195°E
- Completed: 1907
- Owner: Surabaya City Government

Design and construction
- Architect: J.J van der Mey

Balai Pemuda or Alun-Alun Surabaya is a historical site in Surabaya. The site serves as a hub for cultural and artistic activities.

== History ==
Originally built in 1907, it was known as Simpangsche Societeit or Simpangsche Club a nightlife venue for European elites, especially Dutch citizens. The locals affectionately called it “Roemah Kamar Bola” due to the billiards game held there. Designed by Dutch architect Westmaes, this heritage building features a distinctive dome resembling a crown. Today, Balai Pemuda hosts art events, houses the Surabaya Public Library, and includes Alun-alun Surabaya—an outdoor area with a food court and exhibition space12.

During the colonial era, Simpangsche Societeit served as an exclusive club where parties, informal meetings, dances, and other elite entertainment took place. It symbolized Western culture's influence and the dominance of the colonial government. However, after Indonesia gained independence, Balai Pemuda transformed its purpose. It became a hub for youth activities, focusing on education, arts, and culture. Today, it continues to thrive as a cultural center, promoting heritage preservation and community engagement.

== See also ==
- Indonesian architecture
- Colonial architecture in Surabaya
- Neo Renaissance Style
