= Bank Indonesia Museum =

Museum in Jakarta

- Museum Bank Indonesia
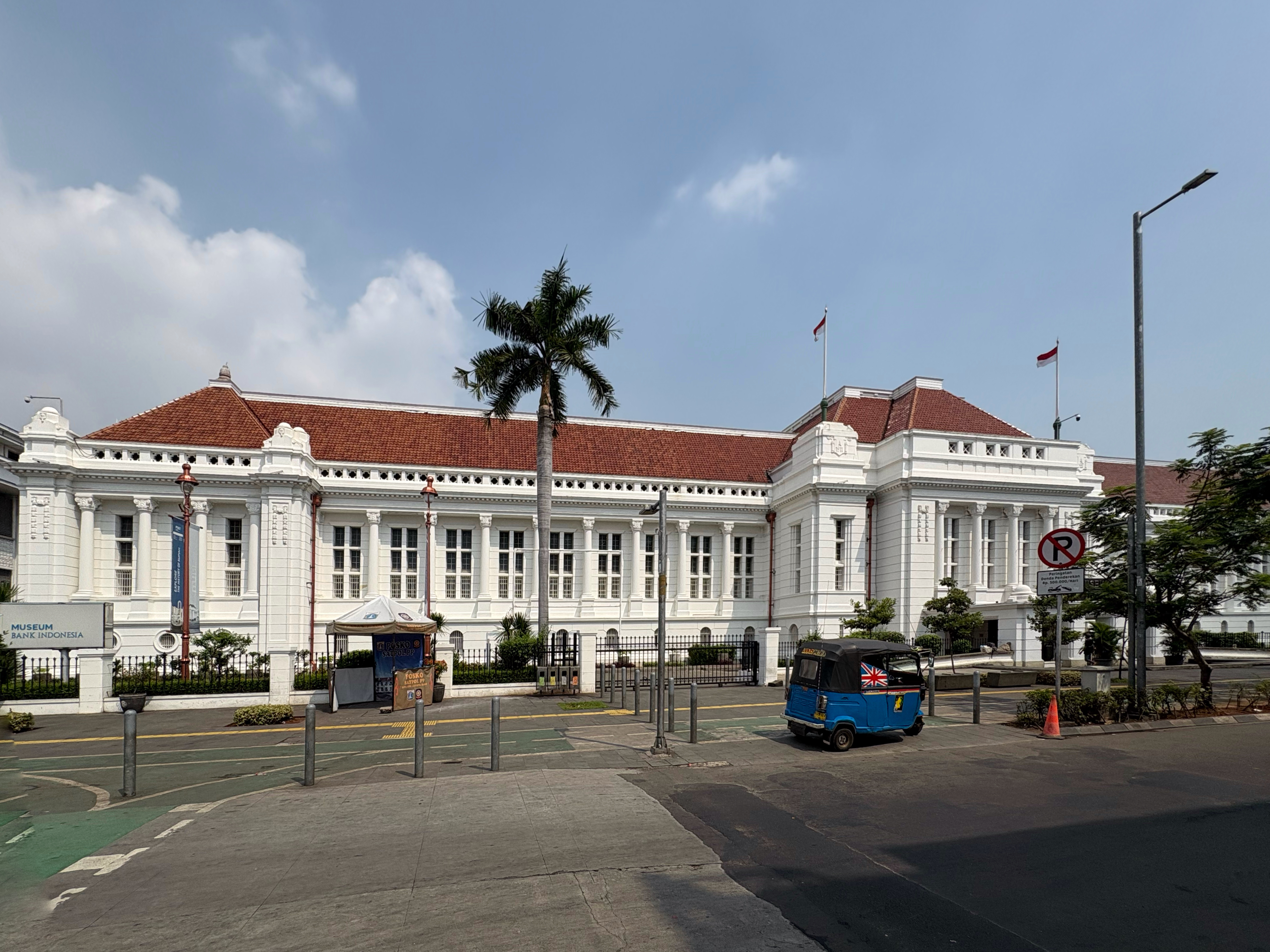

- Location within Jakarta
- Established: July 21, 2009
- Location: Jl. Pintu Besar Utara No. 3, Jakarta Barat
- Coordinates: 6.137333°S 106.812816°E
- Type: economic and numismatics
- Collection size: A collection of old currencies and display on history of banking system in Indonesia.
- Owner: Bank Indonesia
- Public transit access: Jakarta Kota; Kota
- Website: www.bi.go.id/en/layanan/museum-bi/default.aspx

Bank Indonesia Museum (Indonesian: Museum Bank Indonesia, occasionally called Museum BI), also called in English officially as BI Museum, is a bank museum located in Jakarta, Indonesia. It was founded by Bank Indonesia and opened on 21 July 2009. The museum is housed in a heritage building in Jakarta Old Town that had been the first headquarters of the Netherlands Indies gulden (De Javasche bank), the central bank of the Dutch East Indies. The bank was nationalized as Bank Indonesia in 1953, after Indonesia gained its independence. It is located next to Mandiri Museum.

== History ==
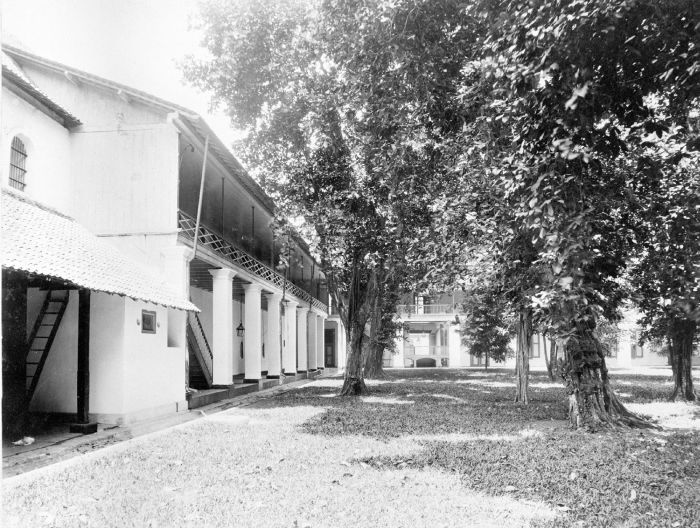
The old courtyard in 1901, depicting the earlier hospital architecture.

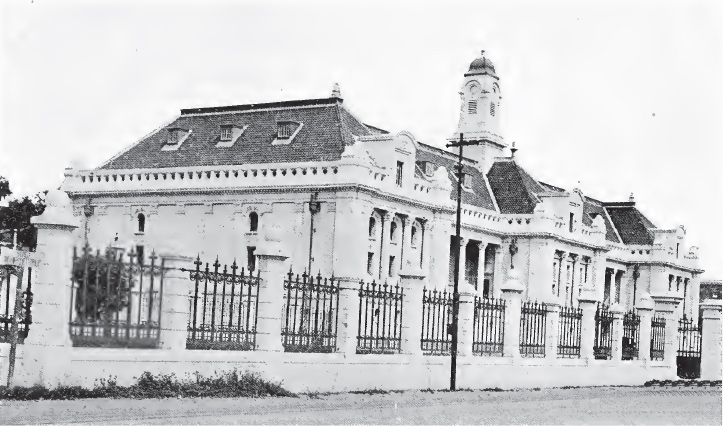
The old bank building in 1918.

De Javasche Bank was formed in 1828 as a circulation bank of the Dutch East Indies and was responsible for issuing Netherlands Indies Guldens. The building stood in a plot that had been Batavia's Inner Hospital (in Dutch: "Binnenhospital" named "inner" due to its location being inside the wall), which was built in the early 18th century and was abandoned in 1780, as the central hospital was moved to Weltevreden. The building was sold to the trade firm Mac Quoid Davidson & Co. in 1801, and was purchased by De Javasche bank in 1831.

The old hospital building was demolished in the early 20th and on the site a new building designed by Eduard Cuypers was erected. Eduard Cuypers (1859-1927) was a famed Dutch architect and was keen on experimenting and inserting indigenous Indonesian elements into his design. The building's original front facade was completed in 1913 in Neo-Renaissance architecture with Javanese ornaments on its details. The inner court was only changed into its present form after extension between 1924-1928. In 1936 the building was given a completely new facade at the front designed by the Fermont-Cuypers office, successors of Eduard Cuypers.

The bank continued as the acting central bank of Indonesia during the Japanese occupation in 1942 and after the Indonesian declaration of independence in 1945. Its first Rupiah note was printed in 1944 under Japanese supervision, in an effort to nationalize its identity. After the Netherlands recognized Indonesia's independence in 1950, the Indonesian government agreed to retain De Javasche Bank as central bank of Indonesia. However, with increasing animosity between the two party, the bank was nationalized as Bank Indonesia in 1953.

In 1962 a new central bank headquarters building was completed and the old building was left to deteriorate. The building was restored into a museum in 2006, and was formally opened by President Susilo Bambang Yudhoyono on 21 July 2009.

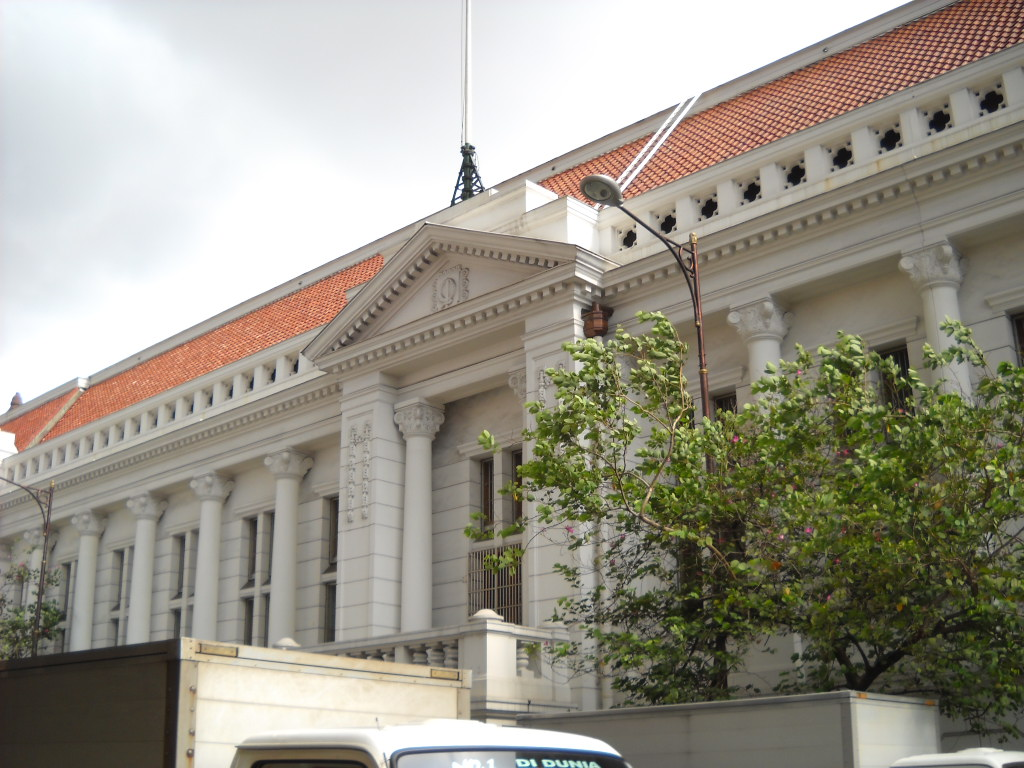
Facade of the Bank Indonesia museum.

== Museum ==
The museum is closed on Mondays (including public holidays) and has an entrance fee of Rp5,000.

The museum is designed to introduce the public to Bank Indonesia's role in Indonesian history, such as monetary policies and payment systems that change over time. The museum also provides visitors with an audio and visual experience on the history of currencies and trade in Indonesia from the pre-colonial era to the present state. It includes eras such as the early spice-trading history, Dutch East India Company spice monopoly in the Indonesian archipelago, banking system of the Dutch East Indies, currencies under Japanese occupation and ends on the economic crisis of 1997.

The museum includes old currencies from around the world in its display collection, from as early as the 14th century pre-colonial era.

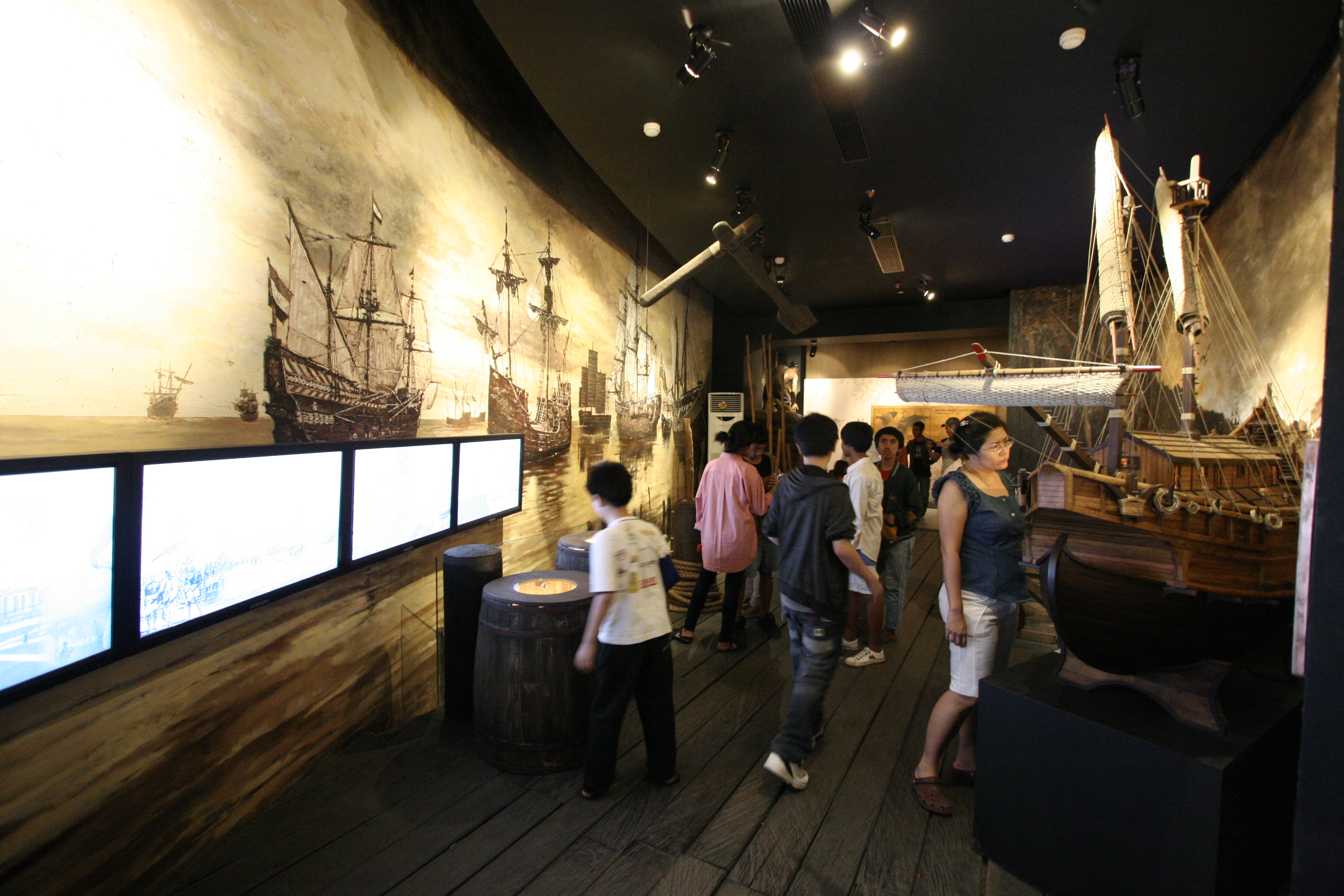

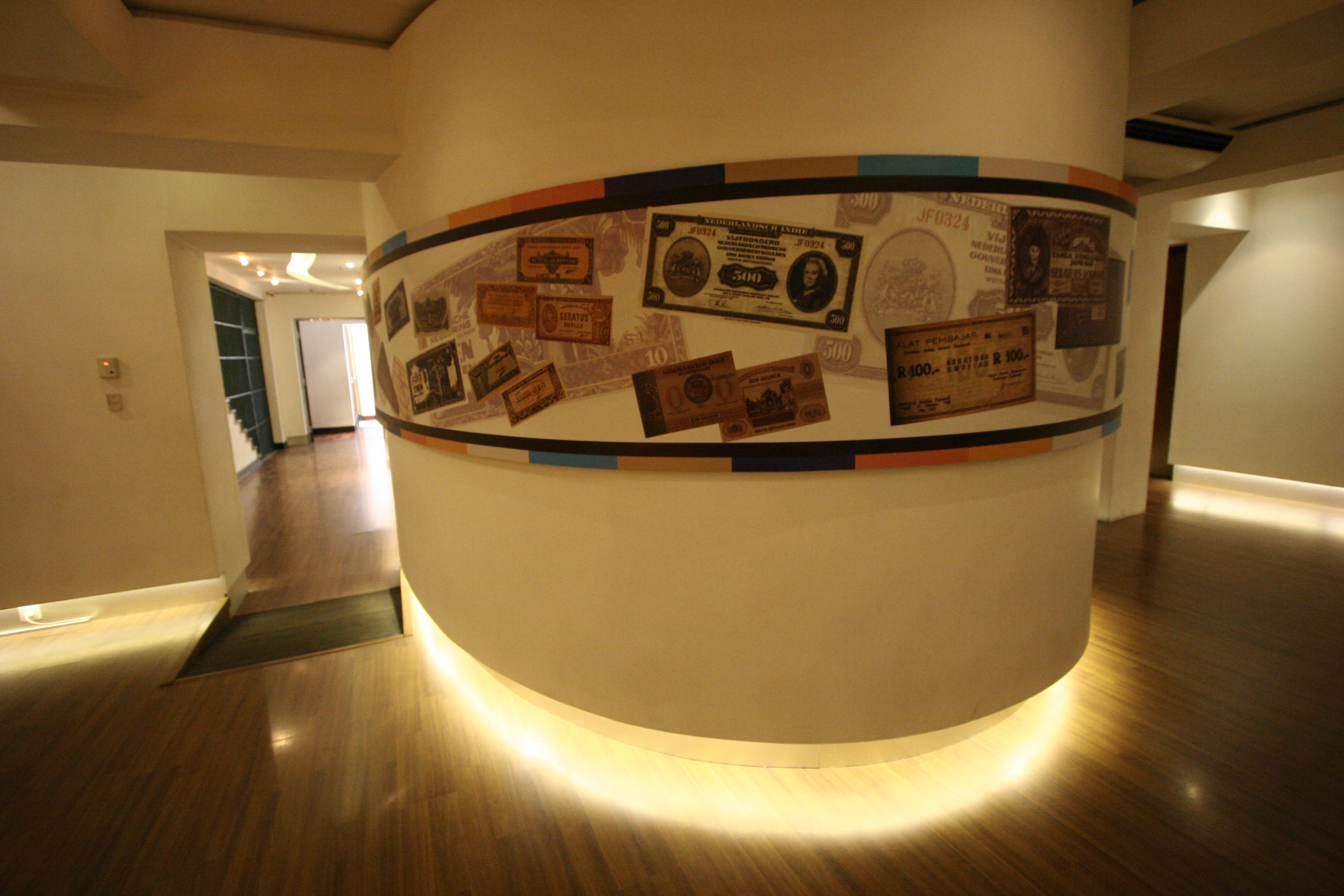

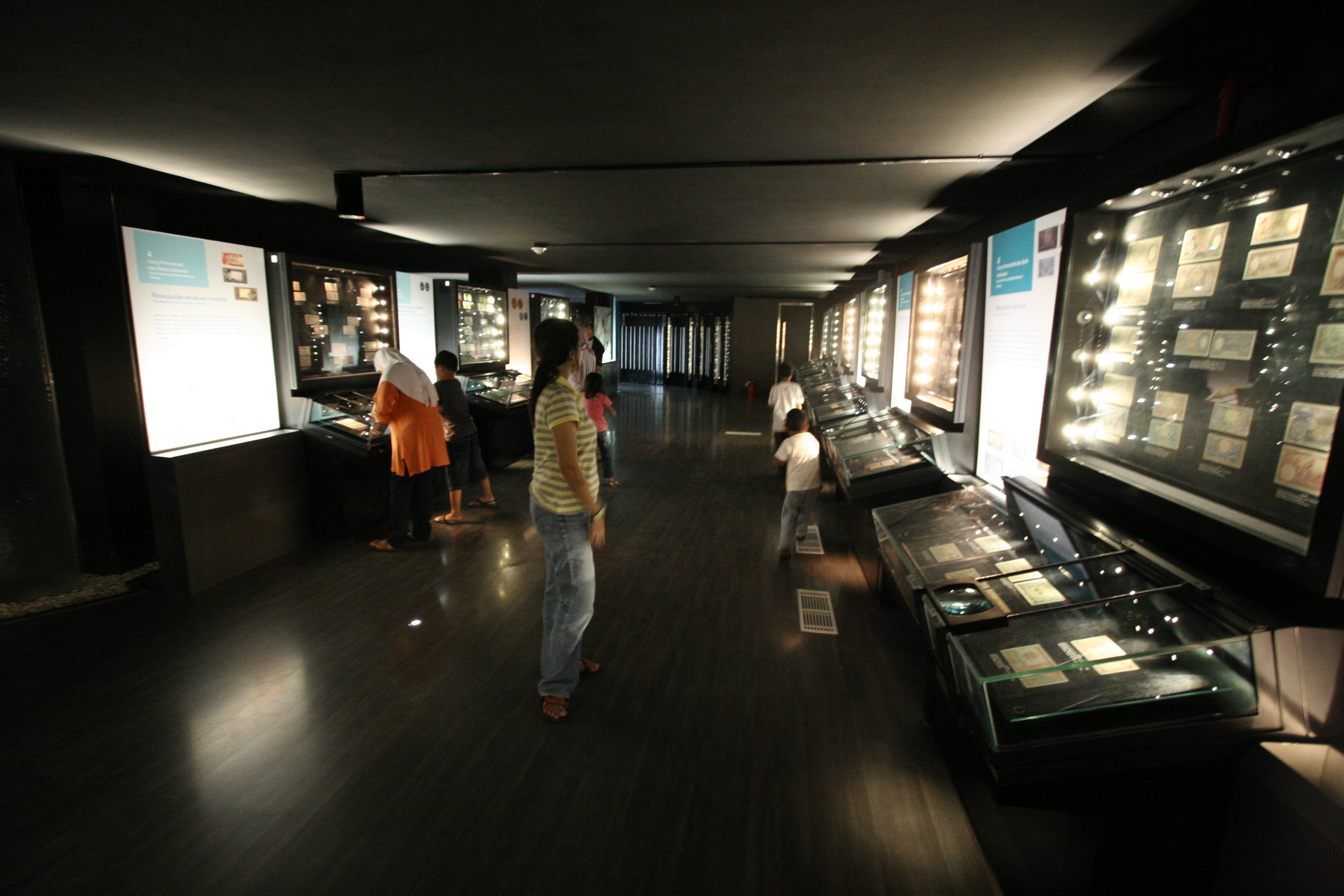

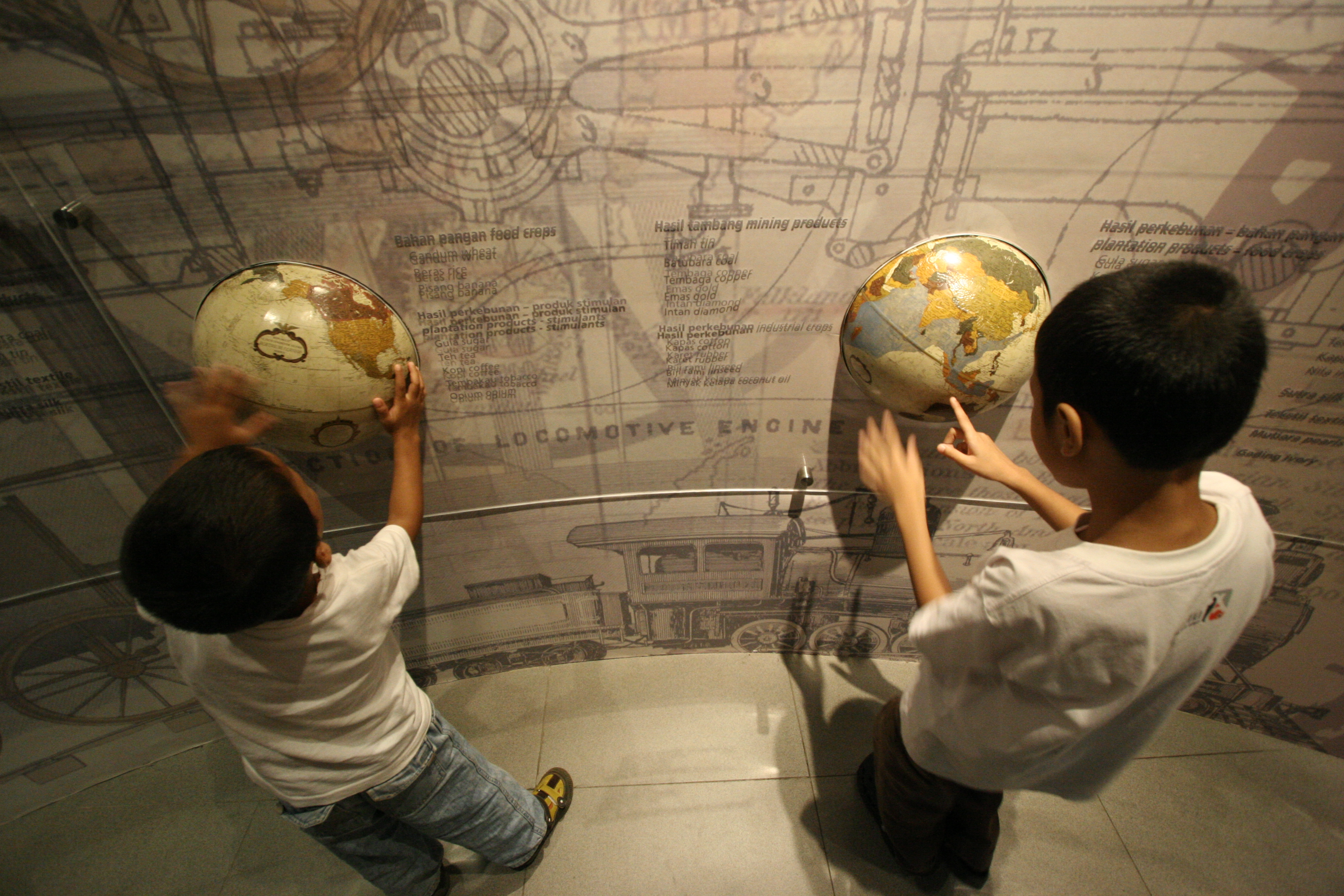

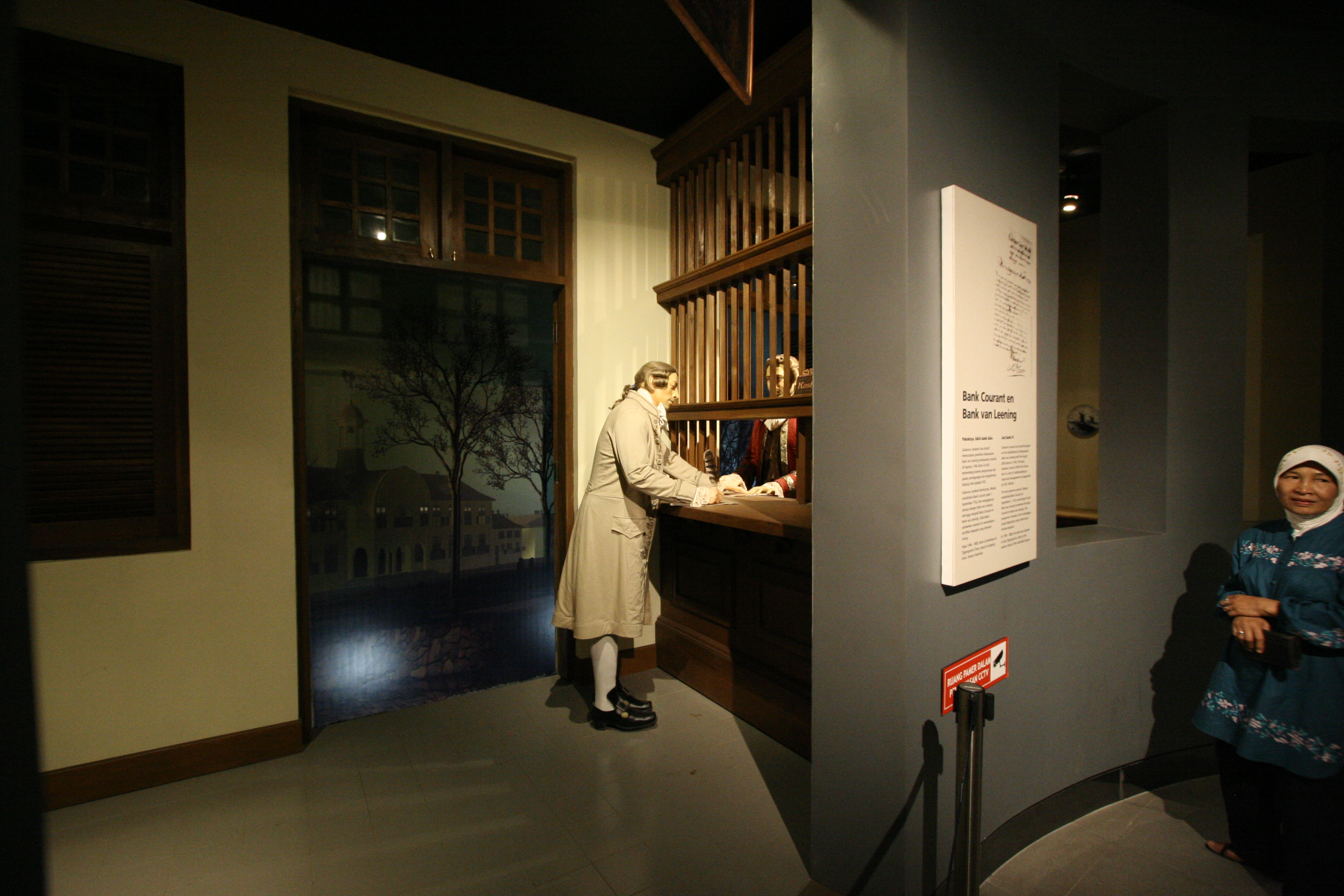

== See also ==
- List of colonial buildings and structures in Jakarta
- List of museums and cultural institutions in Indonesia
- Other museums owned by Bank Indonesia:
  - Bank Indonesia Museum, Padang
  - Bank Indonesia Museum, Surabaya
