= Gedges Rocks =

The Gedges Rocks (65°20′S 64°32′W) are a group of rocks located 3 nautical miles (6 km) north-northwest of Grim Rock and 10 nautical miles (19 km) west-southwest of Cape Tuxen, off the west coast of Graham Land, Antarctica. They were discovered by the British Graham Land Expedition, 1934–37, and named "Gedges Reef" after The Gedges, a dangerous reef off the mouth of the Helford River in Cornwall, England. In 1971, the UK Antarctic Place-Names Committee reported that the term rocks is more appropriate for this feature.
