= Grim (surname) =

Grim is a surname. Notable people with the surname include:

- Allan Kuhn Grim, (1904–1965), American federal judge
- Bob Grim (baseball) (1930—1996), Major League Baseball player
- Bob Grim (American football) (born 1945), American football player
- Bobby Grim (1924–1995), American racecar driver
- Emanuel Grim (1883–1950), Polish priest and writer
- Fred Grim (born 1965), Dutch retired football goalkeeper
- Harriet Grim (1884–1967), American suffragist
- John Grim (baseball) (1867–1961), Major League Baseball player
- Morgan Grim (born 1988), American basketball player
- Ryan Grim (born 1978), American journalist

== See also ==
- Grimm (surname)
