= Eduard Cuypers =

Dutch architect

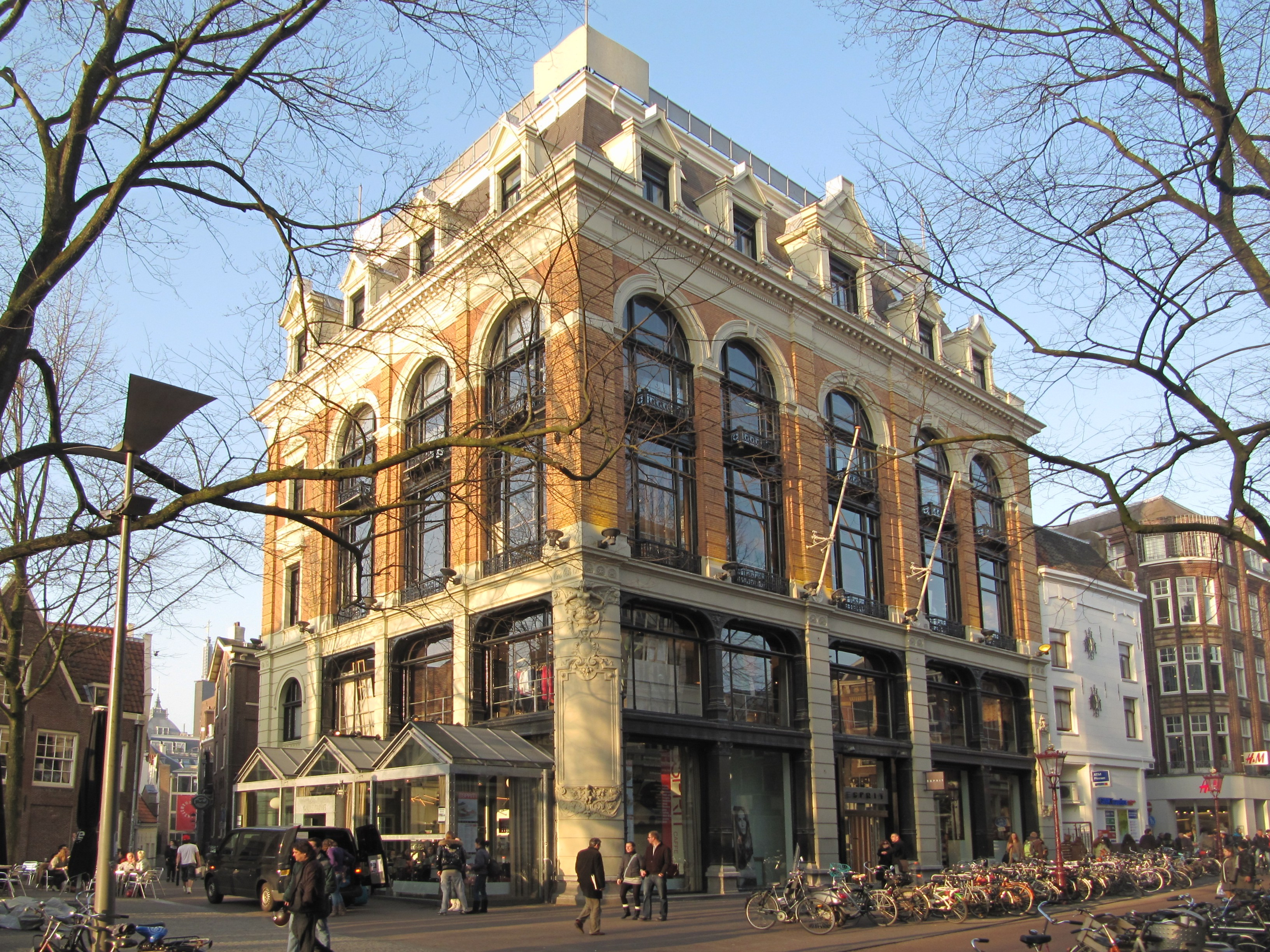
Spui 10 by Eduard Cuypers

Eduard Cuypers (18 April 1859 in Roermond – 1 June 1927 in The Hague) was a Dutch architect. He worked in Amsterdam and the Dutch East Indies.

== Biography ==
Eduard Henricus Gerardus Hubertus Cuypers was trained in the architectural practice of his uncle Pierre Cuypers, the country's major neo-Gothic architect. In 1881 set up his own office in Amsterdam. He received commissions for offices, shops, villas, and residences. Despite his training, he did not work in the Neo-Gothic style embraced by his uncle; instead, his early work in the Netherlands was strongly influenced by the stylistic influences that emerged and disappeared as neo-renaissance, jugendstil, Rationalism, e.s.o... In 1899, Cuypers moved in Amsterdam to a house on Jan Luijkenstraat 2 he designed. He lived on the ground floor. The first and second floors were designated as "bachelor's quarters," intended for live-in employees. He also maintained a library in which he collected books on architecture, art, and culture. In the attic was a studio where female employees worked on lampshades, curtains, and upholstery. Some rooms were also set up as exhibition spaces where visitors could learn about developments in interior design. Around 1905, Cuypers' architectural firm called ‘Ed. Cuypers’ and workplace employed some fifty people, making it one of the largest in the Netherlands. Until his death in 1927, more than 250 projects were designed, all over the Netherlands. Eduard Cuypers and his employees also designed pieces of furniture and other objects for interiors, such as lamps. In 1905 Cuypers published Het Huis, Oud & Nieuw (The House, Old and New), a magazine for interior design that was published until he died in 1927. He was buried at Zorgvlied cemetery.

The office of Eduard Cuypers is considered to be the origin of the Amsterdam School because the leaders of this style, Michel de Klerk, Johan van der Mey, and Piet Kramer, were trained there. Berend Tobia Boeyinga, another follower of the Amsterdam school, also worked for Cuypers, as did prominent Indonesian architect Liem Bwan Tjie. After Cuypers died in 1927, his office was continued by others. The current name in the Netherlands is A/D Amstel Architects in Amsterdam.

=== Dutch East Indies ===
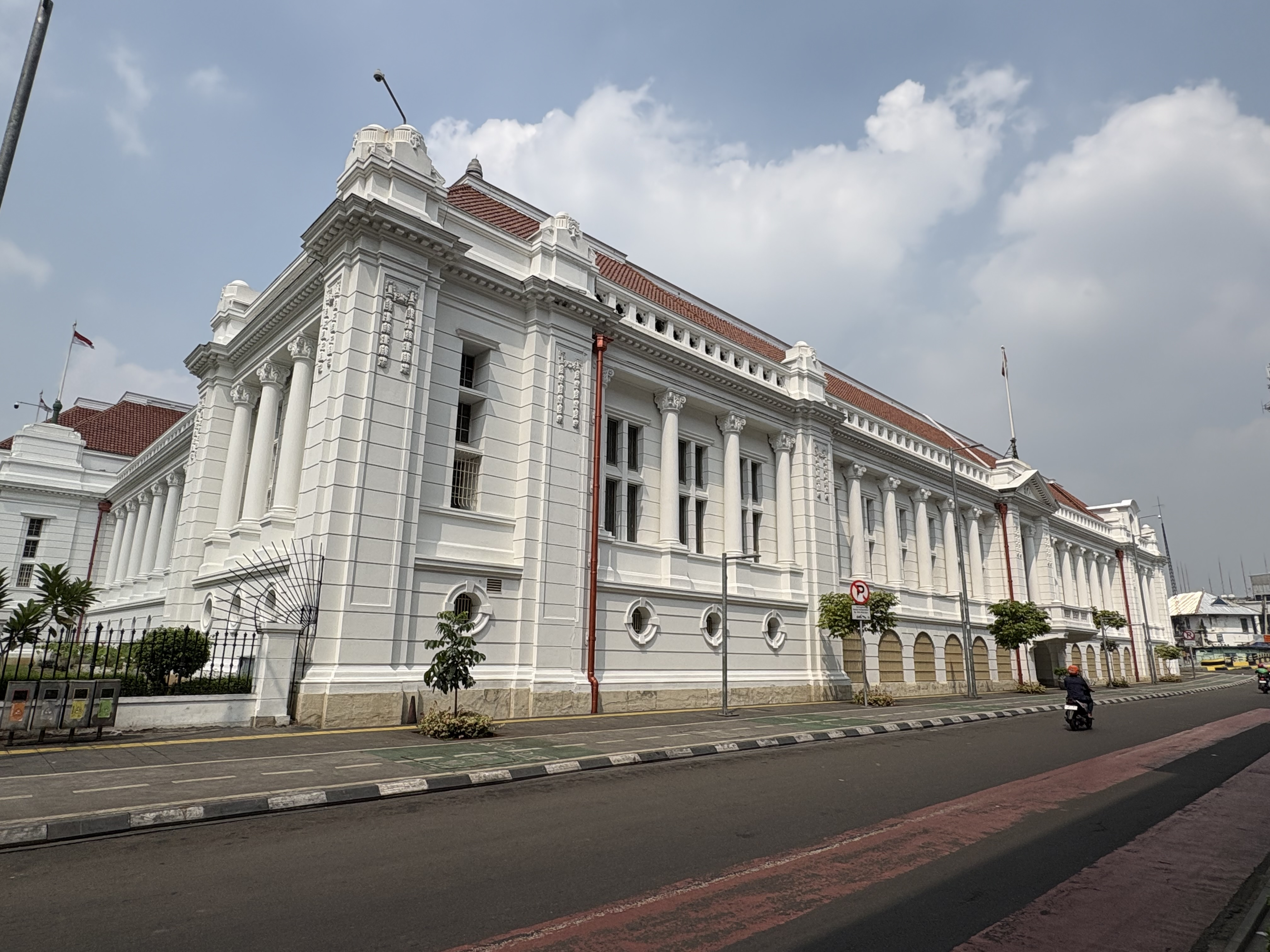
De Javasche Bank now Museum Bank Indonesia, Jakarta.

Cuypers first encountered the Dutch East Indies when, in 1907. He was commissioned by Gerard Vissering, director of the Javasche Bank (Java Bank), to design several bank buildings. The new bank buildings in the Dutch East Indies were to exude allure, comparable to the bank and government buildings in cities like Singapore, Hong Kong, Sydney, and Manila. An influential architect in the Dutch East Indies, Pieter Moojen (1879-1955) , was the first to be given the opportunity to design the bank buildings. However, his designs, in a contemporary Dutch architectural style in the spirit of Dutch architect H.P. Berlage (1856-1934), were not well-received. Vissering knew that Cuypers was sympathetic to the Beaux-Arts style, a style he considered suitable for the Dutch East Indies. This architectural style was not popular in the Netherlands, and therefore hardly any buildings were built in it.

In 1907, work began of two bank buildings, one in Medan and the other in Surakarta. In 1909, Cuypers travelled to the Indies to explore building sites for future banks, to observe the progress, and to sign an agreement with Marius Hulswit (1862-1921), who built the cathedral in Batavia (Jakarta). The firm was called "Ed. Cuypers and Hulswit," which established itself in Weltevreden (Batavia), while Cuypers worked from Amsterdam. In the beginning the office faced considerable opposition from the municipality in Batavia, where the aforementioned Pieter Moojen till 1913 had considerable influence on the assessment of building plans. Cuypers was more or less forced to design in the 'Nederlandsch-Indische Bouwstijl' (New Indies style). In 1914, Hulswit and Cuypers associated with the technical firm of A.A. Fermont, which was responsible for project execution, and the name became "Hulswit-Fermont and Ed. Cuypers." After the death of Marius Hulswit in 1921, the firm became the name "N.V. Architecten-Ingenieursbureau Hulswit-Fermont in Weltevreden and Ed. Cuypers in Amsterdam." Hulswit-Fermont-Cuypers designed more than a hundred buildings. The architecture was strongly influenced by stylistic influences as; Beaux-Arts Revival, New Indies style, Expressionist architecture and Art Deco. After the death of Eduard Cuypers, the firm was called Fermont-Cuypers, and it existed until its demise in 1960, with more than hundred buildings too, all over Indonesia. Arthur Fermont died in 1967.

== Works in Indonesia ==
What about Indonesia, Eduard Cuypers designed among other things;

- Javasche Bank now Museum Bank Indonesia, Jakarta (with Hulswit,1913) Frontbuilding rebuilt in 1936-1937 by Fermont-Cuypers.
- Javasche Bank now Bank Indonesia, Medan (1909), Surakarta (1910), Makassar (1910), Surabaya (1912), Yokyakarta (1915), Manado (1916), Banda Aceh (1918), Bandung (1918), Ceribon (1921), Palembang (1922), Malang (1922), Banjarmasin (1923), Pematang Siantar (1923), Padang (1925).
- Bankbuildings now Bank Mandiri; Chartered Bank (Kali Besar, Jakarta, 1922), Escomptobank (Jl. Juanda, Jakarta, 1924).
- Office-buildings; Gedung Jasindo (Jakarta, 1920), PT. Perkebunan Nusantara XI (Surabaya, 1925), PT. Perkebunan Nustatara IV (Medan, 1927).
- Hospitals; RS Carolus (Jakarta, 1919), Dr Yap (Yogyakarta, 1923).
- Schools; SMA Santa Angela, (Bandung, 1922), SMA Santa Theresia (Jakarta, 1927), Yayasan Yuwati Bhakti Angela (Sukabumi, 1927).
- Churches; GBIP Pniël (Jakarta, 1915), Pastoran St. Antonius (Muntilan, 1915), Hati Kudus Yesus Church (Surabaya, 1921), Ursulin Monastery Santa Maria Chapel (Jakarta, 1924), Gereja Santo Yusup (Ambarawa, 1924), Cor Jesu Chapel and School complex (Malang, 1925), Santo Antonius Padua Church (Yogyakarta, 1926).
