= Brothers Grim (band) =

Russian pop-rock group

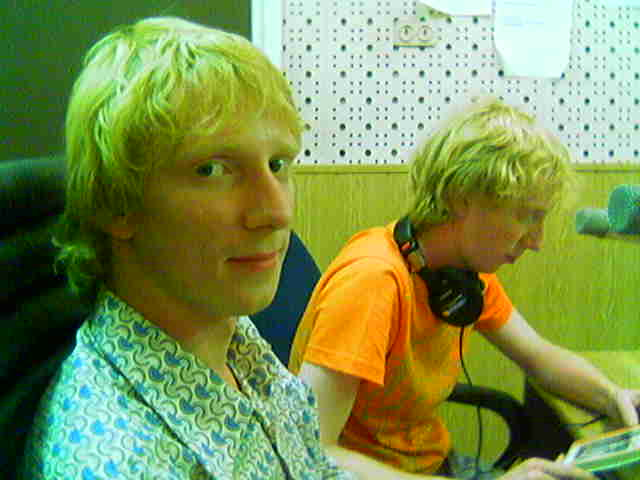
- Brothers Grim in 2005

Background information
- Origin: Russia
- Genres: Pop-rock
- Years active: 1998 — 2009; 2010 – present

Brothers Grim (Russian: Братья Грим) is a Russian pop-rock group. Created by twins Boris and Konstantin Burdaevs in 1998.

== Awards ==
- 2005: Golden Gramophone
- 2005: Song of the Year
- 2007: Popov Award
- 2007: Radio Maximum Award
- 2013: Lira

== Studio albums ==
- The Brothers Grim (Russian: Братья Грим; 2005)
- Illusion (Иллюзия; 2006)
- Spring Tales of the Brothers Grim (Весенние сказки братьев Грим; 2006)
- The Martians (Марсиане; 2007)
- Titan Wings (Крылья Титана; 2010)
- Favorite Music (Любимая музыка; 2015)
- Zombie (Zoмби; 2015)
- Robinson (Робинзон; 2019)
