= Silke Grimm =

German politician (born 1967)

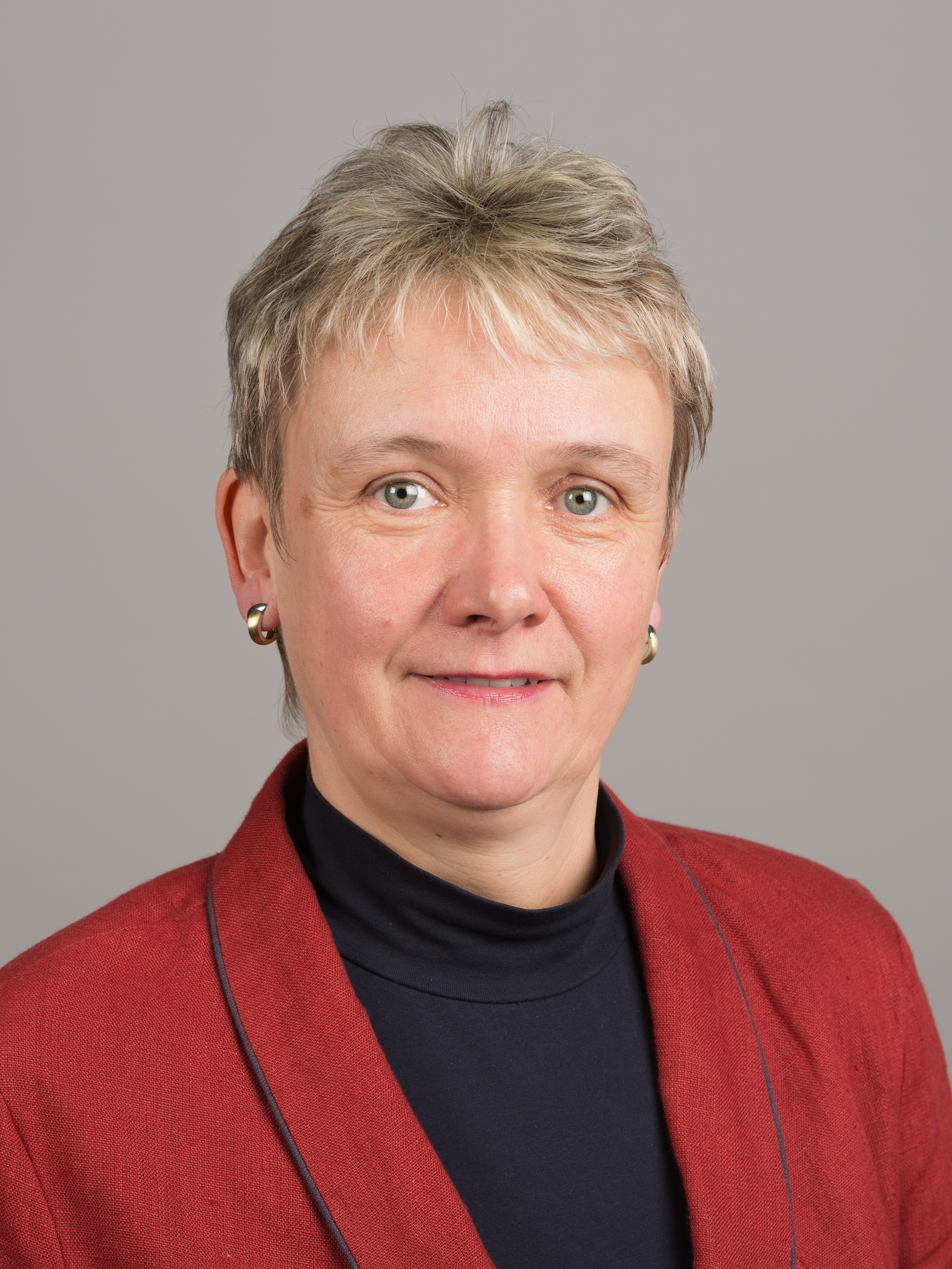
- Silke Grimm

Member of the Saxony State Parliament
- In office 2014–2019
- Constituency: District 59 (Saxony)

Personal details
- Born: June 22, 1967 (age 59)
- Party: AfD
- Profession: Politician

Silke Grimm (born June 22, 1967, in Seifhennersdorf) is a German politician. From 2014 until September 2019, she was a member of the Saxon state Parliament.

== Life and career ==
From 1974 to 1984, Grimm attended POS Niederoderwitz. She interrupted her preparatory course for the Abitur due to her mother's severe illness. In the same year, she commenced an apprenticeship as a data processing specialist at the Zittau College, which she successfully completed in 1986. From 1988 to 1989, she worked in her learned profession at the college.

In March 1990, Grimm opened her first travel agency in Zittau. A year later, she passed the IHK (Chamber of Commerce and Industry) qualification examination as a transport operator in road passenger transport. Later, she began as an entrepreneur in bus operations, managing factory, regular, student, and excursion transportation.

Grimm is married and has two children.

== Political involvement ==
Grimm joined the Alternative for Germany party on May 20, 2013. During the local elections in Saxony in 2014, she secured a seat in the District Council of Görlitz. She was the direct candidate in constituency 59 during the Saxony state elections in 2014. In her constituency, Grimm garnered 4036 votes, which accounted for 15.2% of all votes cast. She entered the state parliament through the regional list. Within the parliament, she worked in the committee for "Economics, Labor, and Transportation" and served as the spokesperson for transport policy for the party. Additionally, she was a member of the Public Transport Strategy Commission and the Enquiry Commission on "Nursing". She was involved with the party in Working Groups I and IV.

According to a report by the tageszeitung, Grimm advocated for the reinstatement of border controls between European neighboring countries ahead of the Saxony state elections. As per Die Zeit, she reportedly advocated for "police companies in border areas" and the elimination of dedicated staff positions for caring for the Lausitz wolves. Instead, she suggested resuming wolf hunting, claiming they are dangerous and reproduce rapidly. She alleged that existing problems related to wolves in Saxony were concealed in official reports. She also believed that Islam is incompatible with German culture.

Grimm did not run again in the Saxony state elections in 2019. During the nomination of direct candidates and the regional list, she lost to internal party competitors.

As of January 1, 2022, Grimm resigned from the AfD.
