= Heroes of High Favor: Dwarves =

Heroes of High Favor: Dwarves is a 2002 role-playing game supplement published by Bad Axe Games.

== Contents ==
Heroes of High Favor: Dwarves is a supplement in which a toolkit-style supplement expands dwarven play with new feats, skills, runes, prestige classes, and detailed crafting rules, celebrating both their master artisanship and formidable martial traditions.

== Reviews ==
- Pyramid
- Asgard (Issue 7 - Sep 2002)
- Fictional Reality (Issue 9 - Sep 2002)
