= Surabaya City Hall =

- Balai Kota Surabaya

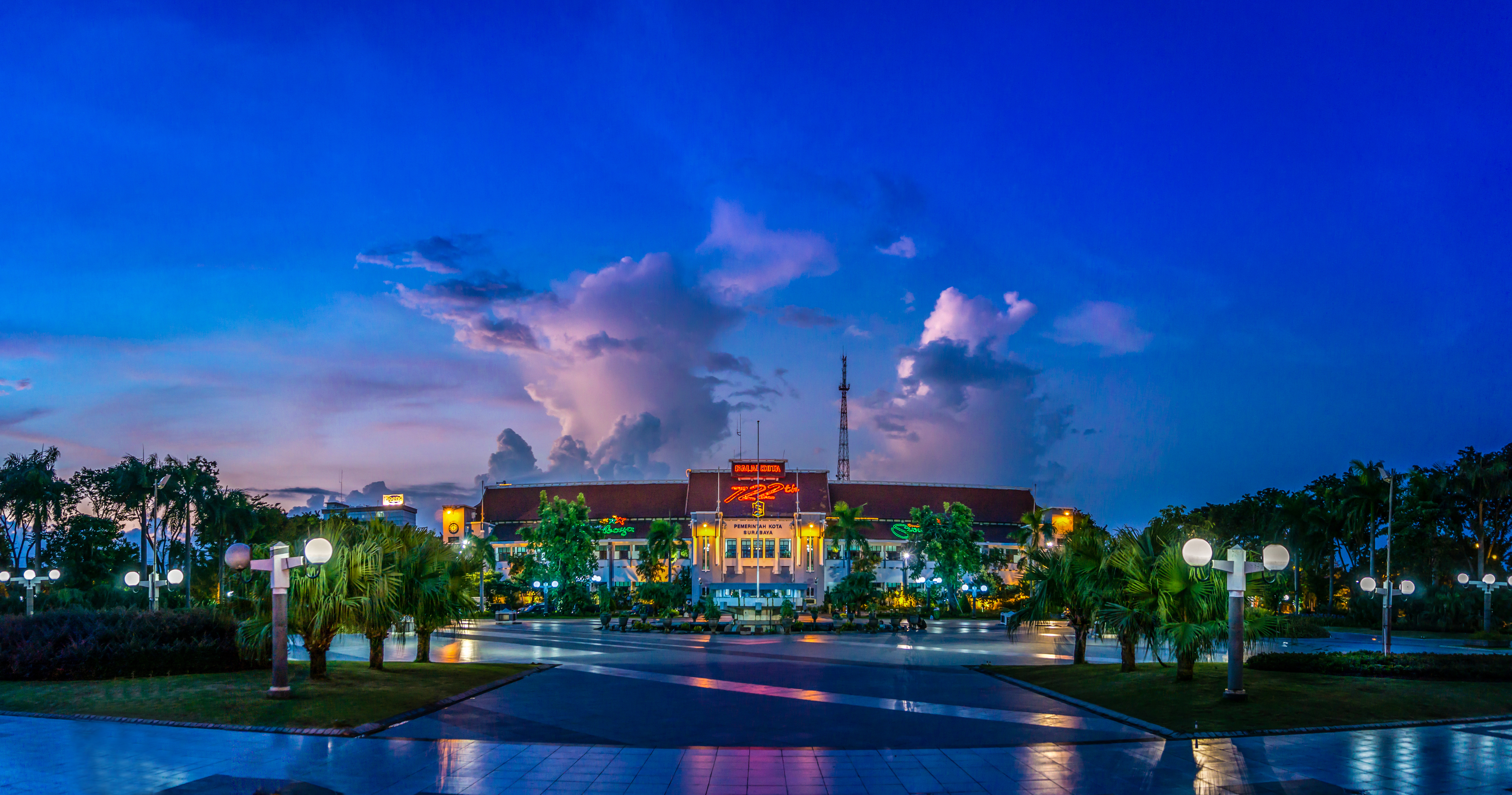
- Surabaya City Hall
- Interactive map of the Surabaya City Hall area
- Former names: Raadhuis Soerabaja

General information
- Type: City Hall
- Architectural style: New Indies Style
- Location: Surabaya, Jalan Taman Surya, Indonesia
- Coordinates: 7.259257°S 112.747003°E
- Elevation: 5 m (16 ft)
- Construction started: 1923
- Estimated completion: 1927
- Cost: ƒ 350000
- Owner: The Government of the City of Surabaya

Design and construction
- Architect: Cosman Citroen
- Main contractor: Hollandsche Beton Mij.

Surabaya City Hall (Indonesian: Balai Kota Surabaya) is the administrative center of the city of Surabaya. The building was built by Cosman Citroen in the 1920s. The building is one of the example of 20th century buildings designed in a tropical-conscious climate of Indonesia, the style is known as the New Indies Style.

== History ==
Surabaya was already an official municipality (gemeente) since April 1, 1906, however, there is no official city hall for the new municipality. In 1916, the first sketch of a new City Hall for Surabaya was proposed by Cosman Citroen. The fact that Citroen has just arrived in Surabaya from the Netherlands in 1915 and in such a short time received a prestigious project indicated his good business relationship in the colonial Dutch East Indies. His first proposal for the new City Hall was located at Stadstuin (now Pasar Besar, in front of Tugu Pahlawan). In 1920, a decision was made to move the City Hall into Ketabang, a new district to the east of the Kali Mas which had been purchased by the municipality of Surabaya with government support. One of the reasons for the chosen of this location is because of its relative "emptiness" as a new district, which allowed a large plan to be implemented.

This new plot of land is a large rectangular-shaped land bounded by the Djimertoweg (now Jalan Jimerto) to the north, the Sedapmalamweg (Jalan Sedap Malam) to the east, the Ondomohenweg (now Jalan Walikota Mustajab) to the south, and the Ketabang Besar (the avenue Jaksa Agung Suprapto) to the west. The district of Ketabang is connected with the older districts of Surabaya on the west bank of the river with two bridges.

The new design of the City Hall in Ketabang was proposed by Cosman Citroen in 1925 and construction had to commence. The original plan shows four masses of buildings located in the cardinal direction surrounding a central square-shaped courtyard. Because of funding issues, the rear north-side building is the only part of the complex that was realized. Several issues regarding the economic misconduct at the time of crisis (which started in 1921) are several reasons why construction of the City Hall took a long course. During the long period of its construction, the funding for several parts of the new building was donated by several companies. For example, the furniture was donated by the General Dutch East Indies Electricity Company ANIEM. Citroen also designed the furniture.

The opening of the new town hall took place in November 1927.

== Architecture and interior design ==
The building was designed by Cosman Citroen, a Dutch Indies architect who also designed the Headquarter office of the Dutch East Indies Railway Company in Semarang (now Lawang Sewu). Construction of the building was done by Hollandsche Beton Mij. The building is 19 metres (62 ft) wide and 102 metres (335 ft) long. On the ground floor are the central business administration, the constituency chamber, department heads and the population registration department. On the upper floor in the middle the boardroom and left and right there is the room for the secretary, waiting rooms, department of municipal affairs and the archive. The building is 19 meters in width and 102 meters in length.

From the original plan of 1916/1917, only the rear building was realized. The unfinished side wings and front wing building is now a large park in front of the building that now stands. The overall look of Surabaya City Hall is similar with Cubism, with highly contrasting shadows emphasized by the cubic forms on the facade. Surabaya City Hall was designed with consideration on the tropical climate of Indonesia, a design movement which influenced many buildings in the early 20th-century Netherlands East Indies. This popular new modern movement of architecture is known as the New Indies Style. Among characteristics of New Indies Style apparent in the Surabaya City Hall are the two-layered roofs which allow light and ventilation to flow into the interior through the space between the roofs. The building is surrounded by galleries, a feature which protects the interior of the building from the direct sun and water from the frequent tropical rainfalls typical of the tropics. Generous opening in the windows and walls also allows cross ventilation into the interior of the building. The building is mainly constructed of reinforced concrete, while the roof frame is made of steel.

The interior is designed in 20th-century modern style heavily influenced with Dutch interior design movement e.g. the Amsterdam School and De Stijl. Various private individuals as well as companies contributed to the new establishment. Some furniture in the boardroom was donated by ANIEM electrical company. The boards in the mayor's office was donated by Sam Liem Kongsi. J.J. Zeidel donated a marble plaque in the hallway. Other contributors for the building were W.J. Stokvis (an old silver lamp and a painting in the mayor's room), Lindeteves-Stokvis (a fridge), the Dutch Gas Company, etc.

== See also ==
- Colonial architecture in Surabaya

== Cited works ==
- de Zeeuw, Wouter (2001). "Citroen, Cosman". Het Nieuwe Instituut (in Dutch). Het Nieuwe Instituut.
- Faber, G.H. von (1931). Nieuwe Soerabaia. Soerabaia: H. van Ingen.
