= Morgan Grim =

American basketball player

No. 9 – Uni Baskets Paderborn
- Position: Center
- League: ProA

Personal information
- Born: November 7, 1988 (age 36) Salt Lake City, US
- Listed height: 6 ft 8 in (2.03 m)
- Listed weight: 216 lb (98 kg)

Career information
- College: Utah State (2007–2012)
- Playing career: 2012–present

Career history
- 2012–present: Paderborn Baskets

Morgan Scott Grim (born 7 November 1988) is an American professional basketball player who currently plays for the Uni Baskets Paderborn of the German ProA League.
