= Bank Indonesia Museum, Surabaya =

Museum in Surabaya, East Java, Indonesia

- Museum Bank Indonesia, Surabaya
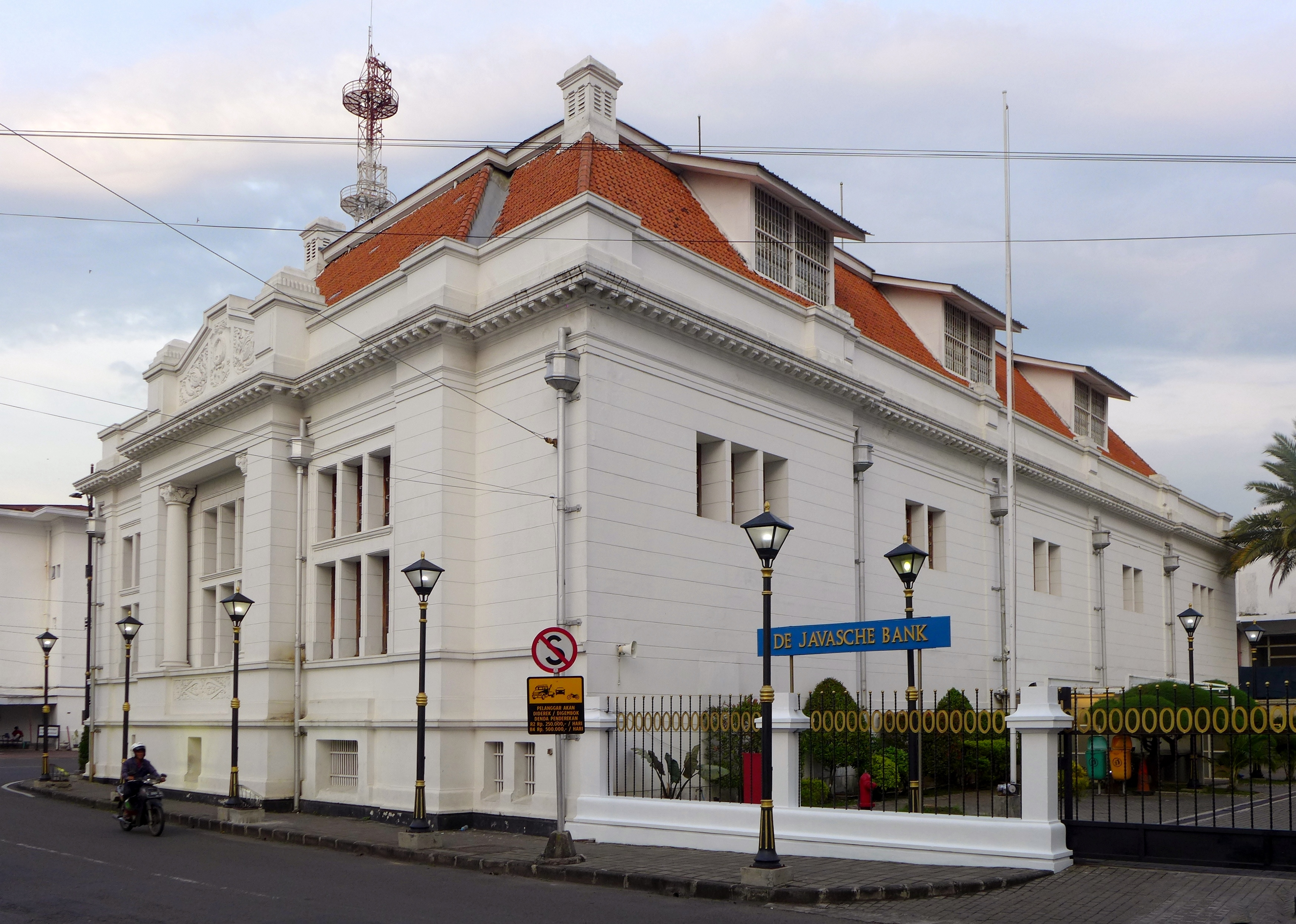
- The museum in 2025

- Location in Surabaya
- Former name: De Javasche Bank Soerabaia
- Established: 14 September 1829; 196 years ago (original building) 1904; 122 years ago (rebuilt) 27 January 2012; 14 years ago (museum established)
- Location: Jl Garuda No. 1, Surabaya
- Coordinates: 7°14′07.2″S 112°44′12.5″E
- Type: economic and numismatics
- Collection size: A collection of old currencies and display on history of banking system in Indonesia.
- Owner: Bank Indonesia
- Website: Museum BI Surabaya

Bank Indonesia Museum (Indonesian: Museum Bank Indonesia) is a bank museum located in Surabaya, Indonesia. It was officially founded by Bank Indonesia and was opened on 27 January 2012 after its restoration. The museum occupies a building formerly known as De Javasche Bank, the central bank of Dutch East Indies. After the Indonesian Independence the building continued to function as the Bank Indonesia's branch in Surabaya until 1973. The museum is closed on Monday and public holidays. It has no entrance fee.

== History ==
De Javasche Bank opened a branch in Surabaya on 14 September 1829. By 1904 the original building that occupied the plot was demolished and was rebuilt with an area of 1,000 square metres. It was designed by the Amsterdam architect Eduard Cuypers (1859-1927). He did it in a similar manner to De Javasche Bank headquarter in Batavia, with Neo-Renaissance architecture and Javanese adornment.

== The museum ==
The museum has 3 floors and displays the history of the banking system in Indonesia, old photos of Surabaya and old currencies. The museum display is divided into 3 rooms:

- Collection of old currencies Room - The room formerly functioned as safe deposit room and is used to display old currencies of Indonesia.
- Collection from conservation Room - The room contains building materials which were replaced for the conservation, as well history of the bank's construction.
- Collection of cultural treasure Room - The room displays old bank machinery and equipment.

== Gallery ==
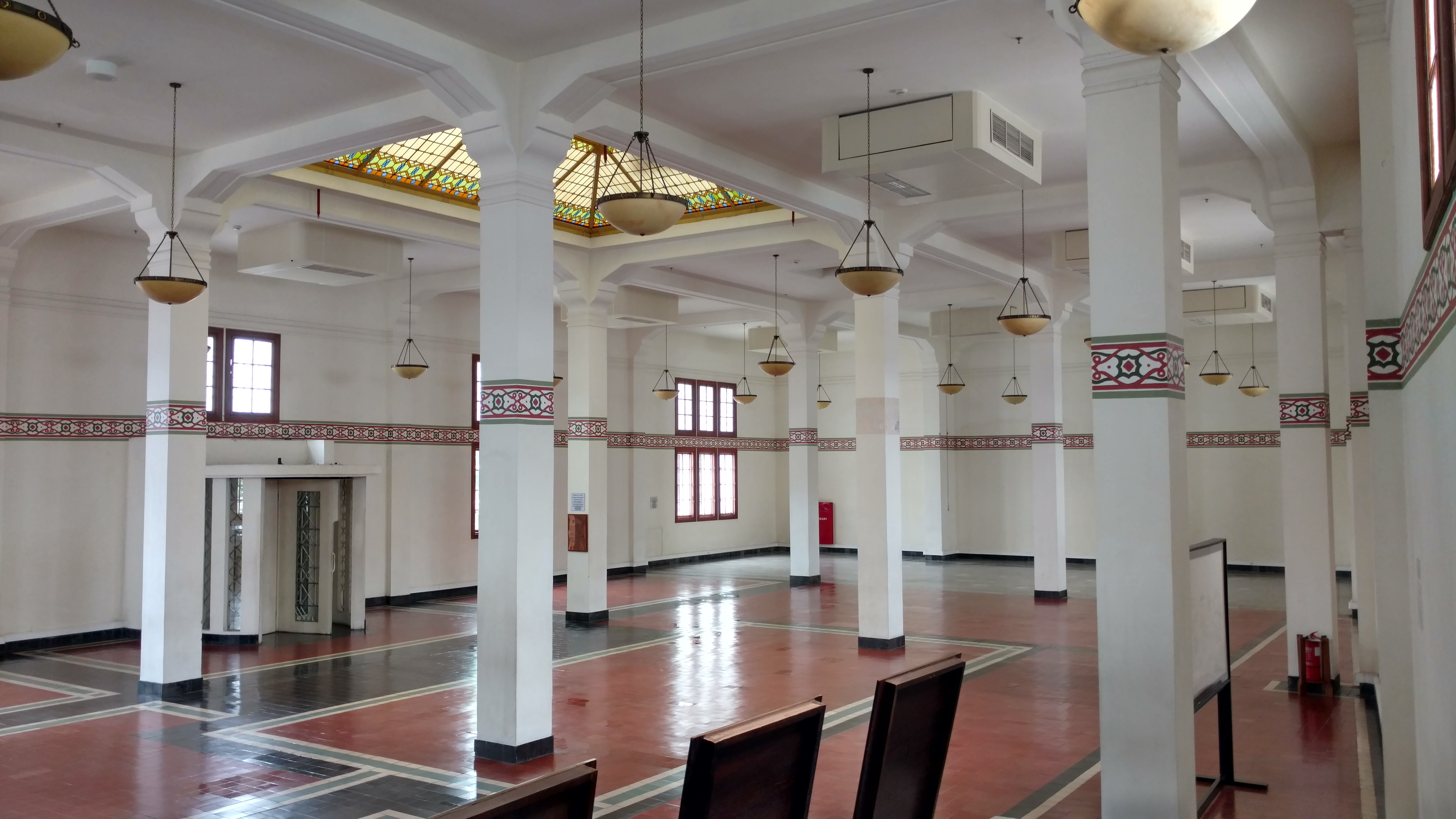
Main room of BI Surabaya Museum

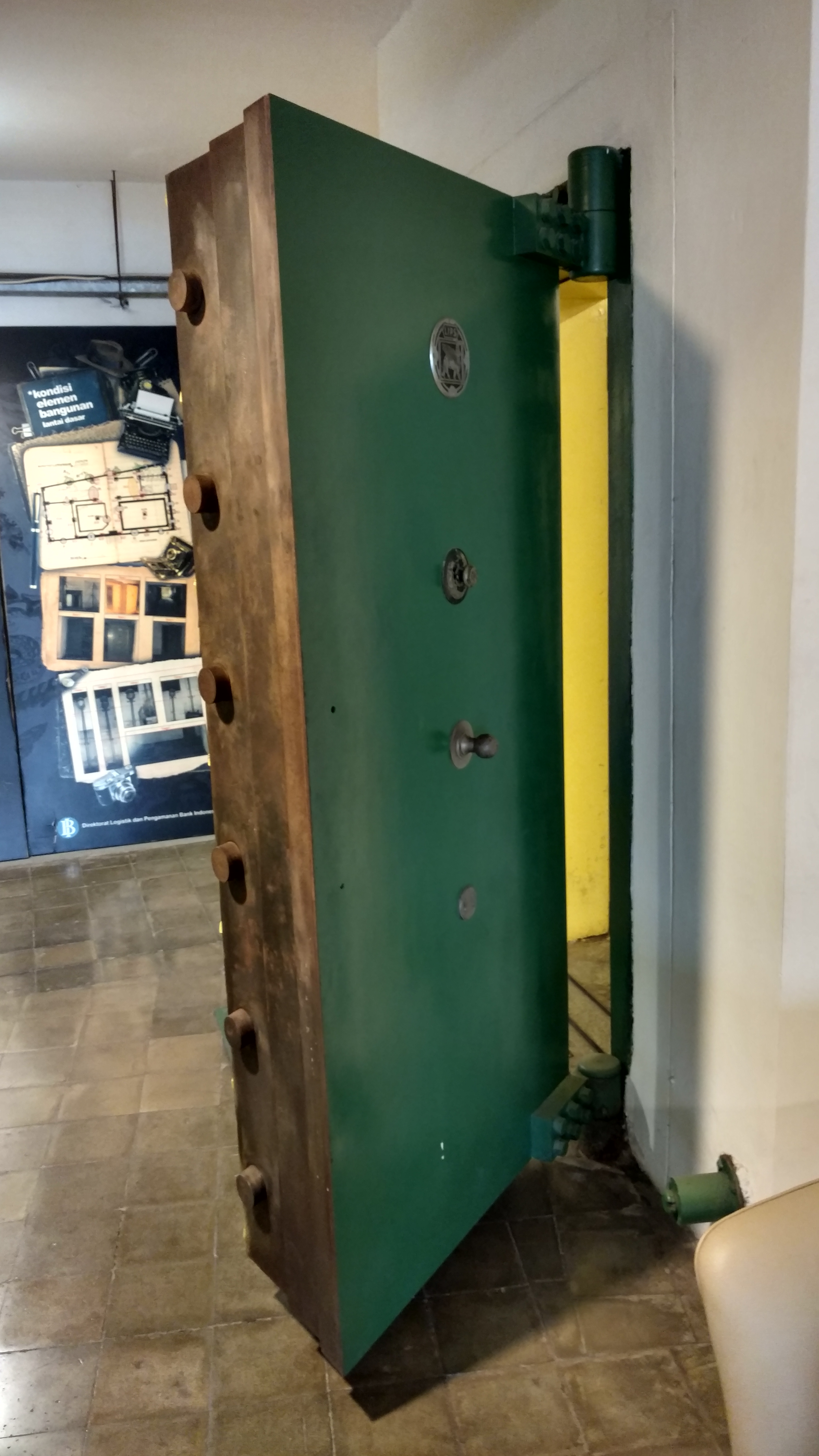
Safe door in the basement

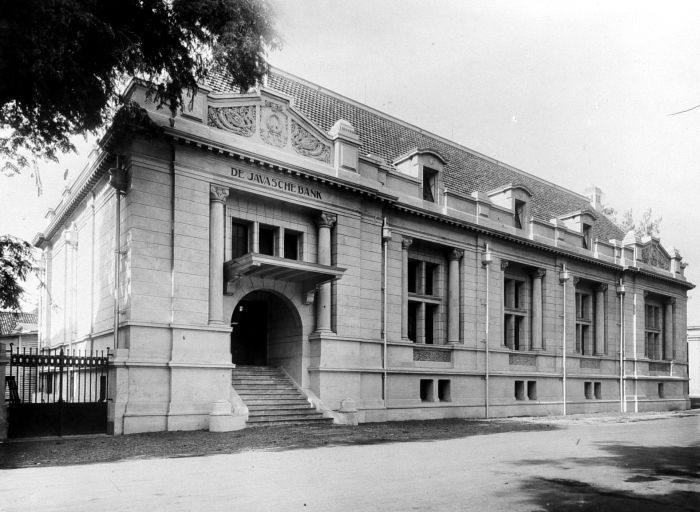
De Javasche Bank Surabaya in 1910s

== See also ==
- List of museums and cultural institutions in Indonesia
- Museum Bank Indonesia, Jakarta
