= Michael Grimm =

Michael Grimm may refer to:

- Michael Grimm (musician) (born 1978), American singer/songwriter
  - Michael Grimm (album)
- Michael Grimm (politician) (born 1970), former U.S. Representative
- Michael Grimm, name once proposed for the Mortal Kombat character Johnny Cage
