= Grim Rock =

Antarctic rock

Grim Rock (65°23′S 64°29′W) is a rock awash 3 nautical miles (6 km) south-southeast of the Gedges Rocks and 10 nautical miles (19 km) west-northwest of Cape Perez, lying in Grandidier Channel off the west coast of Graham Land, Antarctica. It was charted in February 1936 by the British Graham Land Expedition under John Rymill, and so named from its grim appearance.
