= Grimm =

Grimm may refer to:

== People ==
- Grimm (surname), a list of people and fictional characters with the name
- Brothers Grimm, German linguists

== Places ==
- Grimm (Hamburg), Germany
- Grimmenturm, Zürich (Switzerland)

== Film and television ==
- Grimm (TV series), a 2011 American series
- Grimm (film), a 2003 Dutch film
- The Brothers Grimm (film), a 2005 film starring Matt Damon and Heath Ledger
- The Grimm Variations, a 2024 anime series

== Other arts and entertainment ==
- Grimm (musical), a 2014 musical by Peter Lund and Thomas Zaufke
- Grimm (role-playing game), released by Fantasy Flight Games
- Grimms, an English band
- Grimm (band), a Montenegrin rock band

== Fictional characters ==
- Grimm, an Advance Wars: Dual Strike character
- Grimm, a Mirror Mirror character
- Grimm, a Mother Goose and Grimm character
- Grimm the Dragon, a Princess Gwenevere and the Jewel Riders character
- Grimm, a Quick Change character
- Troupe Master Grimm, a Hollow Knight character
- Benjamin Grimm, a Fantastic Four comic book character
- Sister Grimm, a Runaways comic book character
- The Creatures of Grimm, monsters in the web series RWBY

== See also ==
- Brothers Grimm (disambiguation)
- Grimm Tales (disambiguation)
- Grimms' Fairy Tales, a collection of fairy tales by the Brothers Grimm
- Grimm's law, a set of statements by Jacob Grimm about the changes in languages over time
