= Grimm & Co. (restaurant) =

Bakery in Surabaya, Indonesia

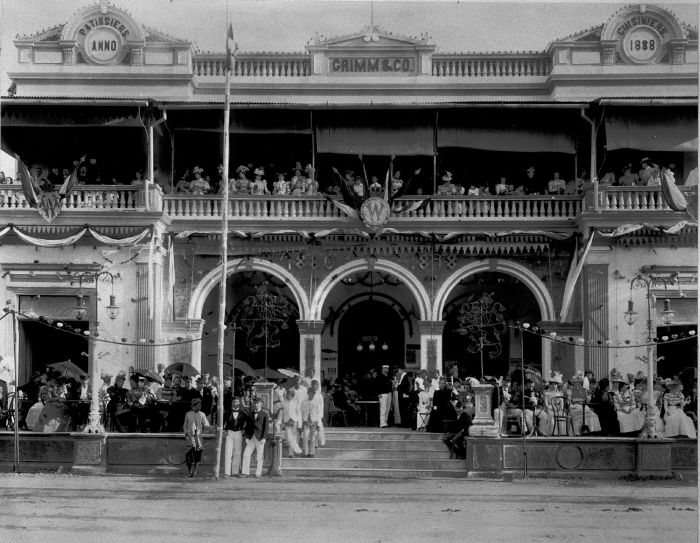
Spectators set to watch the parade celebrating the coronation of Queen Wilhelmina of the Netherlands in 1898

Grimm & Co. was a two-story bakery (patisserie), restaurant, and dance hall in Surabaya, Indonesia. Opened in 1888, it was situated at Jalan Pasar Besar (Pasar Besar weg). The location is now the Tai Chan Restaurant.

== Gallery ==
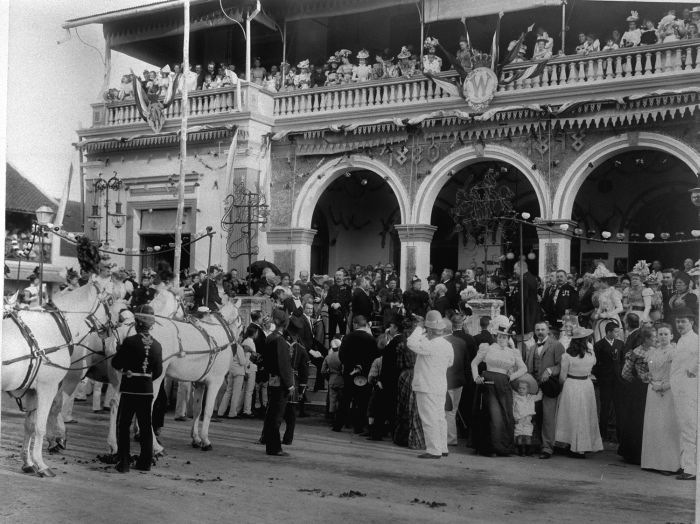

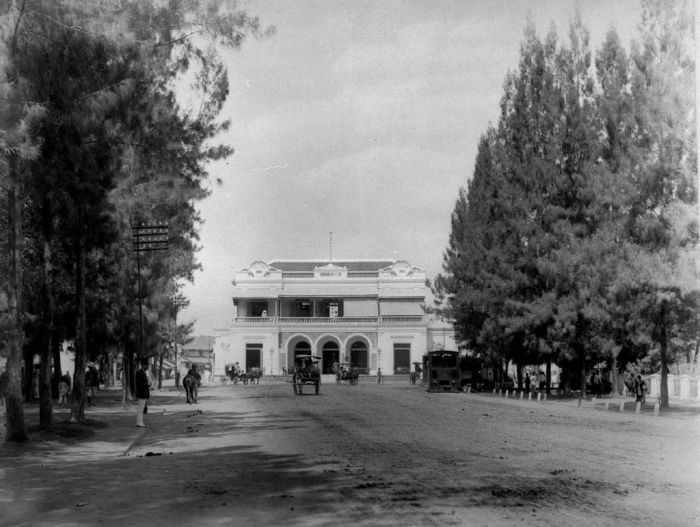
