= Grim Tales (Bad Axe Games) =

2004 role-playing game supplement

Grim Tales is a 2004 role-playing game supplement published by Bad Axe Games.

== Contents ==
Grim Tales is a supplement in which a flexible, low‑magic adventure toolkit lets players build attribute‑based heroes and lets gamemasters mix pulp‑genre options, variant rules, and era‑spanning campaign elements to create customized worlds from ancient myth to post‑apocalyptic futures.

== Reviews ==
- Pyramid
- Fictional Reality (Issue 17 - Sep 2004)
