= Miss Grand West Java =

Provincial pageant in West Java, Indonesia

Miss Grand ฺWest Java Miss Grand Jawa Barat
- Formation: May 6, 2018; 8 years ago
- Founder: Audi Reza Hartanto
- Type: Beauty pageant
- Headquarters: Bandung
- Location: Indonesia
- Official language: Indonesian
- Affiliations: Miss Grand Indonesia

Summary result of West Java representatives at Miss Grand Indonesia
Placement	Number(s)
Winner	1
1st runner-up	0
2nd runner-up	0
Top 5	1
Top 10/11/12	3
Top 15/16	0
Unplaced	1

Miss Grand West Java (Indonesian: Miss Grand Jawa Barat) is an Indonesian provincial beauty pageant, a preliminary in West Java for the Miss Grand Indonesia national contest. It was founded in 2019 by an entrepreneur, Audi Reza Hartanto.

West Java produced one Miss Grand Indonesia winner: Aurra Kharishma, who won the title in 2020.

== History ==
After the Miss Grand Indonesia pageant began franchising the right to send candidates to the national competition in 2018, the license for West Java was obtained by a local entrepreneur, Audi Reza Hartanto, who organized the first Miss Grand West Java contest in Bandung on 6 May 2018 and named a model Mentari Novel the winner. Mentari later represented the province in the Miss Grand Indonesia 2018 national pageant and was placed among the top 10 finalists.

The pageant was dissolved in 2020 after the national license of Miss Grand Indonesia was granted to Ivan Gunawan, who decided not to franchise the provincial licenses to local organizers and instead selected the finalists for the Miss Grand Indonesia 2020 through the online application. Gunawan also established a new national pageant, Miss Mega Bintang Indonesia, as an umbrella pageant for Miss Grand Indonesia in 2023.

Gallery

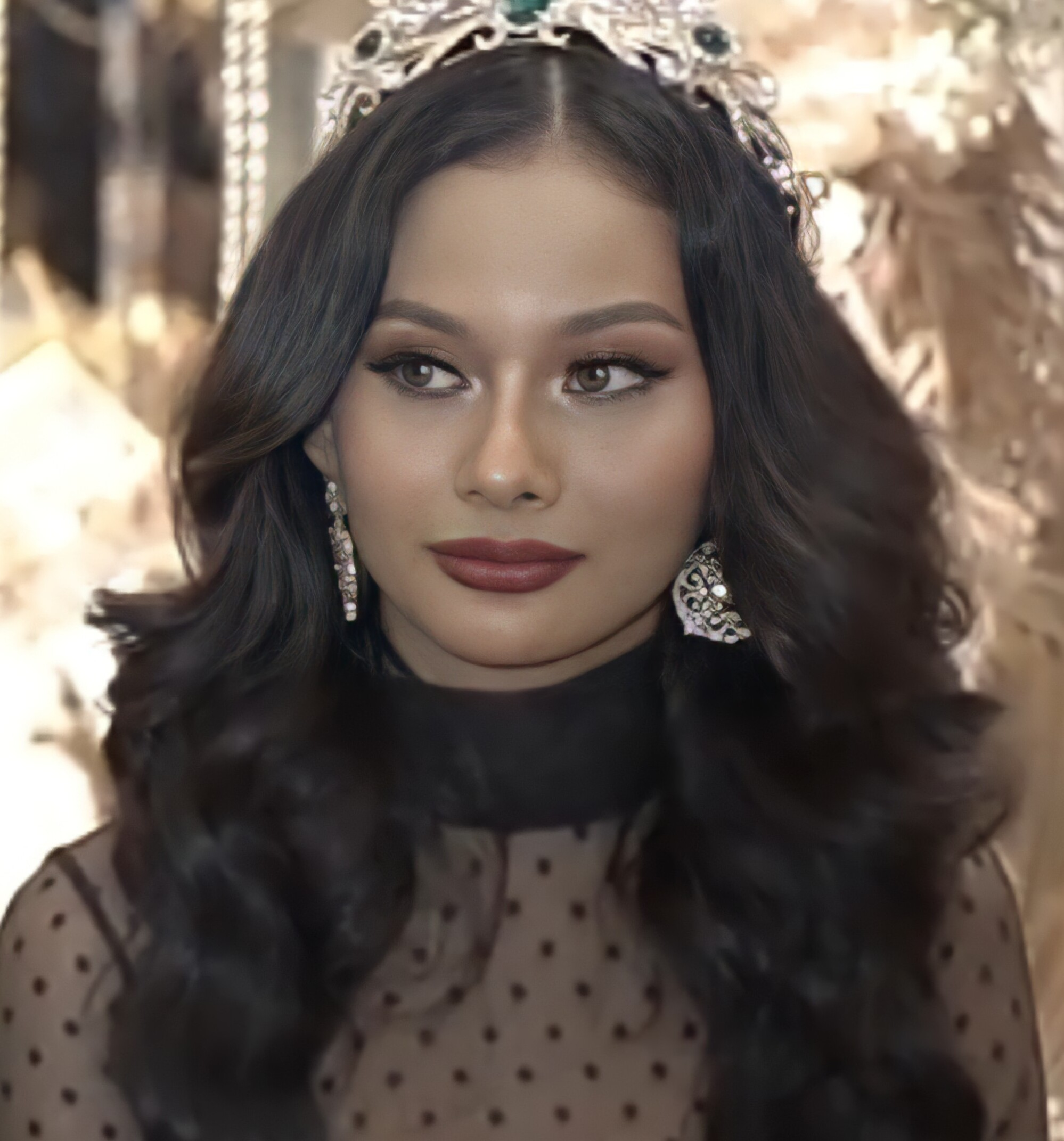
Aurra Kharishma
Miss Grand West Java 2020

== Edition ==
The following table details Miss Grand West Java's annual edition organized as a stand-alone pageant in 2018.

Edition	Date	Final venue	Entrants	Winner	Ref.
1st	May 6, 2018	Grand Tjokro Premiere Hotel, Bandung	10	Mentari Novel	

== National competition ==
The following is a list of West Java representatives who competed at the Miss Grand Indonesia pageant.

Year	Representative	Provincial qualification	Placement at Miss Grand Indonesia	Provincial director	Ref.
2018	Mentari Novel	Miss Grand West Java 2018 winner	Top 10	Audi Reza Hartanto	
2019	Jessica O. Yoshawirja	Appointment	Top 5	Unknown	
2020	Aurra Kharishma	Appointment	Winner	No licensee (Note: Assigned as the provincial representative by the national organizer)	
2021–2022: No pageant, the country's representatives for the international event were appointed.
2023–2024: The country's representatives were determined through Miss Mega Bintang Indonesia.
2025	Putri Sulistiawati	Appointment	Top 11	No licensee	
2026	Linda Fitriani	Appointment	Top 11	Carlo Trisya	
2026	Feby Wulan	Appointment	Unplaced	Carlo Trisya	
