= Miss Grand Bali =

Provincial pageant in Bali, Indonesia

Miss Grand ฺBali
- Formation: May 19, 2018; 8 years ago
- Founder: Putu Ayu Sita Laksmi
- Type: Beauty pageant
- Headquarters: Gianyar
- Location: Indonesia
- Official language: Indonesian
- Director: Ni Luh Pebriani Dewi (2019)
- Affiliations: Miss Grand Indonesia

Summary result of Bali representatives at Miss Grand Indonesia
Placement	Number(s)
Winner	0
1st runner-up	1
2nd runner-up	0
Top 5	1
Top 10/11/12	1
Top 15/16	0
Unplaced	0

Miss Grand Bali is an Indonesian provincial beauty pageant, a preliminary for the Miss Grand Indonesia national contest. It was founded in 2018 by an entrepreneur, Putu Ayu Sita Laksmi.

Bali representatives have not yet won the Miss Grand Indonesia title. The highest placement they obtained was the first runner-up, achieved in 2019 by Cindy Yuliani.

== History ==
After the Miss Grand Indonesia pageant began franchising the right to send candidates to the national competition in 2018, the license for Bali was obtained by a local entrepreneur, Putu Ayu Sita Laksmi. As per the press conference held in April 2018, 58 candidates submitted for the contest but only 10 were elected to compete in the final round, which was held on May 19, 2018, at the Harris Hotel & Residences Sunset Road in Kuta and Putu Ayu Sasadevi was named the winner.

Later in 2019, the license was then transferred to another organizer team led by Ni Luh Pebriani Dewi.

The pageant was dissolved in 2020 after the national license of Miss Grand Indonesia was granted to Ivan Gunawan, who decided not to franchise the provincial licenses to local organizers and instead selected the finalists for the Miss Grand Indonesia 2020 through the online application. Gunawan also established a national pageant, Miss Mega Bintang Indonesia, as an umbrella pageant for Miss Grand Indonesia in 2023.

== Editions ==
The following table details Miss Grand Bali's annual edition organized as a stand-alone pageant in 2018 and 2019.

Edition	Date	Final venue	Entrants	Winner	Ref.
1st	May 19, 2018	Harris Hotel & Residences Sunset Road, Kuta	10	Putu Ayu Sadadevi	
2nd	February 25, 2019	Puri Gangga Resort Sebatu, Tegalalang	10	Cindy Yuliani	

== National competition ==
The following is a list of Bali representatives who competed at the Miss Grand Indonesia pageant.

Year	Representative	Original provincial title	Placement at Miss Grand Indonesia	Provincial director	Ref.
2018	Putu Ayu Sadadevi	Miss Grand Bali 2018	Top 10	Putu Ayu Sita Laksmi	
2019	Cindy Yuliani	Miss Grand Bali 2019	1st runner-up	Ni Luh Pebriani Dewi	
2020	Jazmine Rowe	Appointed	Top 5	No licensee (Note: Assigned as the provincial representative by the national organizer)	
2021–2022: No pageant, the country's representatives for the international event were appointed.
2023–2024: The country's representatives were determined through Miss Mega Bintang Indonesia.
2025	Dela Deniyati	Appointed	Miss Globe Indonesia 2025	No licensee	
