= Miss Grand East Java =

Provincial pageant in East Java, Indonesia

Miss Grand ฺEast Java Miss Grand Jawa Timur
- Formation: June 12, 2019; 7 years ago
- Founder: Jenny Lie
- Type: Beauty pageant
- Headquarters: Surabaya
- Location: Indonesia
- Official language: Indonesian
- Director: Dimas Wijayanto (2025–2026)
- Affiliations: Miss Grand Indonesia

Summary result of East Java representatives at Miss Grand Indonesia
Placement	Number(s)
Winner	0
1st runner-up	2
2nd runner-up	0
Top 5	0
Top 10/11/12	2
Top 15/16	0
Unplaced	0

External videos
- 2025 competition
- 2026 competition

Miss Grand East Java (Indonesian: Miss Grand Jawa Timur or Miss Grand Jatim) is an Indonesian provincial beauty pageant, a preliminary for the Miss Grand Indonesia national contest. It was founded in 2019 by an entrepreneur, Jenny Lie.

The highest placement for an East Java representative so far at the Miss Grand Indonesia was the first runner-up, achieved in 2020 by Bella Sant.

== History ==
East Java debuted in the Miss Grand Indonesia pageant in 2018 when it was represented by an appointed Rizky Maylina. Later in 2019, the license for East Java was granted to the Lions Club Surabaya Grand, a non-governmental organization led by Jenny Lie. Jenny then organized the first Miss Grand East Java contest in Surabaya on 12 June 2019 and named Sheryltha Pratyscha the winner.

The pageant was dissolved in 2020 after the national license of Miss Grand Indonesia was granted to Ivan Gunawan, who decided not to franchise the provincial licenses to local organizers and instead selected the finalists for the Miss Grand Indonesia 2020 through the online application. Gunawan also established a national pageant, Miss Mega Bintang Indonesia, as an umbrella pageant for Miss Grand Indonesia in 2023.

Gallery

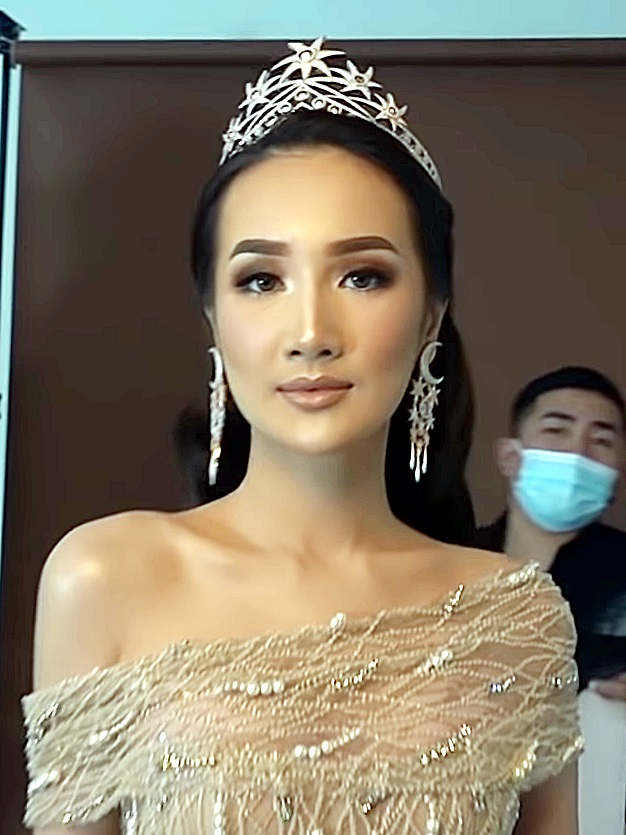
Bella Sant
Miss Grand East Java 2020

== Edition ==
The following table details Miss Grand East Java's annual edition.

Edition	Date	Final venue	Entrants	Winner	Ref.
1st	June 12, 2019	Grand Dafam Hotel Surabaya, Surabaya	12	Sheryltha Pratyscha	
2nd	July 25, 2025	Graha Unesa Convention Center, Surabaya	13	Michelle Gavriele	
3rd	June 2, 2026	Graha Unesa Convention Center, Surabaya	12	Gista Alisa	

== National competition ==
The following is a list of East Java representatives who competed at the Miss Grand Indonesia pageant.

Year	Representative	Provincial qualification	Placement at Miss Grand Indonesia	Provincial director	Ref.
2018	Rizky Maylina	Appointment	Top 10	No licensee (Note: Assigned as the provincial representative by the national organizer)	
2019	Sheryltha Pratyscha	Miss Grand East Java 2019 winner	Top 10	Jenny Lie	
2020	Bella Sant	Appointment	1st runner-up	No licensee	
2021–2022: No pageant, the country's representatives for the international event were appointed.
2023–2024: The country's representatives were determined through Miss Mega Bintang Indonesia.
2025	Michelle Gavriele	Miss Grand East Java 2025 winner	Runner-up	Dimas Wijayanto	
2026	Gista Alisa	Miss Grand East Java 2026 winner	Runner-up	Dimas Wijayanto	
