= Miss Grand Indonesia =

Beauty pageant in Indonesia

- Formation: 21 July 2018; 8 years ago
- Founder: Dikna Faradiba
- Type: Beauty pageant
- Headquarters: Jakarta
- Location: Indonesia
- Members: Miss Grand International; The Miss Globe
- Official language: Indonesia; English
- National director: Jonathan Johanes Handoko (2025–present)
- Parent organization: Yayasan Mahadaya Kemilau Gemintang (2025–present)

Miss Grand Indonesia
licensees timeline

Stand-alone pageant
Under another pageant
Appointed titleholder

Miss Grand Indonesia was an Indonesian female beauty pageant, held annually since 2018. The winners of the contest represented Indonesia at its parent international stage, Miss Grand International, in which an Indonesian delegate, Ariska Putri Pertiwi, won the title in 2016. Before the establishment of the Miss Grand Indonesia pageant, the Indonesian representatives for the aforementioned international stage were appointed or determined through other national pageants.

The pageant was discontinued in 2021 when the country representative was instead handpicked. In 2023 and 2024, Miss Grand Indonesia titleholders were determined through a newly established Miss Mega Bintang Indonesia.

In addition to winning the main title in 2016, Indonesian delegates also qualified for the top 5 in the Miss Grand International pageant in 2018, 2020, and 2022, as well as obtaining the Best National Costume Award in 2016 and 2017.

== History ==
In the first edition of the Miss Grand International pageant, the right to send an Indonesian candidate was granted to Puteri Indonesia, and the 3rd runner-up Puteri Indonesia 2013, Novia Indriani Mamuaja, was appointed as the first Miss Grand Indonesia titleholder. The country representatives for the four following international editions were also appointed: by El John Pageants from 2014 to 2015, and back to Puteri Indonesia from 2016 to 2017 by awarding its 3rd runner-up the Puteri Indonesia Perdamaian title.

Under the management of the Yayasan Dharma Gantari with former Miss Tourism Indonesia 2016 Dikna Faradiba as director, the first edition of the Miss Grand Indonesia pageant was organized in July 2018 in the capital, Jakarta. The auditions were held in 18 cities countrywide to elect the qualified candidates for the national stage. Yayasan Dharma Gantari also held a stand-alone Miss Grand national pageant the following year until the franchise was lost to Yayasan Dunia Mega Bintang of Ivan Gunawan in 2020.

In 2020, under the direction of Ivan Gunawan, the Miss Grand Indonesia pageant was conducted as a pageant reality show with a total of 5 contestants. In addition to Miss Grand International, the runner-up was also sent to compete internationally in the Miss Intercontinental pageant. However, the two following representatives, for the 2021 and 2022 Miss Grand International, were instead appointed. In 2023 and 2024, the Indonesian candidates for Miss Grand were elected through a newly established Miss Mega Bintang Indonesia, in which the runners-up were also sent to compete in other international pageants. In 2025, Ivan Gunawan relinquished the license, and it was then granted to Jonathan Johanes Handoko of Yayasan Mahadaya Kemilau Gemintang (YMKG).

== Regional pageants ==
From 2018 – 2019, three provincial preliminary stages were established to select representatives for Miss Grand Indonesia, including Miss Grand Bali (est. 2018), Miss Grand West Java (est. 2018), and Miss Grand East Java (est. 2019).

== Editions ==
=== Date and venue ===
Edition	Date	Venue	Entrants	Ref.
1st	July 21, 2018	Jakarta Convention Center, Senayan City, Central Jakarta	30	
2nd	August 29, 2019	Balai Sarbini Hall, Setiabudi, South Jakarta	34	
3rd	June 21, 2020	Goodrich Suites, Artotel Portfolio, South Jakarta	5	
4th	August 31, 2025	Bengkel Space SCBD, South Jakarta	18	
5th	August 11, 2026	Nafiri Convention Hall, Central Park, West Jakarta	19	

=== Competition results ===
Year	Miss Grand Indonesia	Vice queens		Ref.
2018	Bengkulu – Nadia Purwoko	North Sumatra – Vivi Wijaya Huang (Note: As the 1st runner-up)	Jakarta – Stephanie Cecillia (Note: As the 2nd runner-up)	
2019	East Nusa Tenggara – Sarlin Jones	Bali – Cindy Yuliani	North Sumatra – Gabriella Hutahaean	
2020	West Java – Aurra Kharishma	East Java – Bella Aprilia	Not awarded	
2025	Central Kalimantan – Vina Anggi Sitorus	Bali – Dela Deniyati (Note: As Miss Globe Indonesia 2025)	Not awarded	
2026	Riau Islands – Dilza Salsabila	Central Java – Verta Arlinsa (Note: As Miss Globe Indonesia 2026)	West Sumatra – Ratih Ayu Syafriza (Note: As Indonesian candidate to the MGI All Stars 2nd Edition)	

== International competition ==
=== Miss Grand International ===
Color keys

- : Declared as Winner
- : Ended as Runner-up of Top 5 qualification
- : Ended as one of the Finalists
- : Ended as one of the Semi-finalists

Year	Representative	National qualification	Competition performance		National director	Ref.
Year	Representative	National qualification	Placement	Special award(s)	National director	Ref.
2013	Novia Indriani	3rd runner-up Puteri Indonesia 2013	Unplaced	—	Mooryati Soedibyo	
2014	Margenie Winarti	1st runner-up Putri Bumi Indonesia	Top 10	Best in Evening Gown	Johnnie Sugiarto	
2015	Yolanda Remetwa	1st runner-up Putri Pariwisata Indonesia	Unplaced	—	Johnnie Sugiarto	
2016	Ariska Putri Pertiwi	Puteri Indonesia Perdamaian 2016	Winner	Best National Costume	Mooryati Soedibyo	
2017	Dea Rizkita	Puteri Indonesia Perdamaian 2017	Top 10	Best National Costume, Miss Popular Vote	Mooryati Soedibyo	
2018	Nadia Purwoko	Miss Grand Indonesia 2018	2nd Runner-up	Best in Social Media	Dikna Faradiba	
2019	Sarlin Jones	Miss Grand Indonesia 2019	Unplaced	—	Dikna Faradiba	
2020	Aurra Kharishma	Miss Grand Indonesia 2020	3rd Runner-up	—	Ivan Gunawan	
2021	Sophia Rogan	Casting/audition	Top 10	—	Ivan Gunawan	
2022	Andina Julie	Casting/audition	2nd Runner-up	—	Ivan Gunawan	
2023	Ritassya Wellgreat	Miss Mega Bintang Indonesia 2023	5th Runner-up	—	Ivan Gunawan	
2024	Nova Liana	Miss Mega Bintang Indonesia 2024	5th Runner-up	Miss Popular Vote	Ivan Gunawan	
2025	Vina Anggi Sitorus	Miss Grand Indonesia 2025	Top 22	—	Jonathan Johanes Handoko	
2026	Dilza Salsabila	Miss Grand Indonesia 2026	Unplaced	—	Jonathan Johanes Handoko	

=== Other international pageants ===
Some runners-up of the Miss Grand Indonesia pageant, which was held as a stand-alone contest from 2018 to 2020, were also sent to compete internationally, as detailed below.

Year	Representative	National qualification	International pageant		Ref.
Year	Representative	National qualification	Pageant	Result	Ref.
2020	Bella Aprilia	1st runner-up – Miss Grand Indonesia 2020	Miss Intercontinental 2020	Top 20	
2022	Nadia Tjoa	Top 5 – Miss Grand Indonesia 2020	Miss Face Of Humanity 2022	Winner	
2025	Dela Deniyati	Top 2 – Miss Grand Indonesia 2025	The Miss Globe 2025	Top 11	
2026	Verta Arlinsa	Top 3 – Miss Grand Indonesia 2026	The Miss Globe 2026	Top 11	

== Gallery ==
Miss Grand Indonesia 2026
Dilza Salsabila,
(Kepulauan Riau)

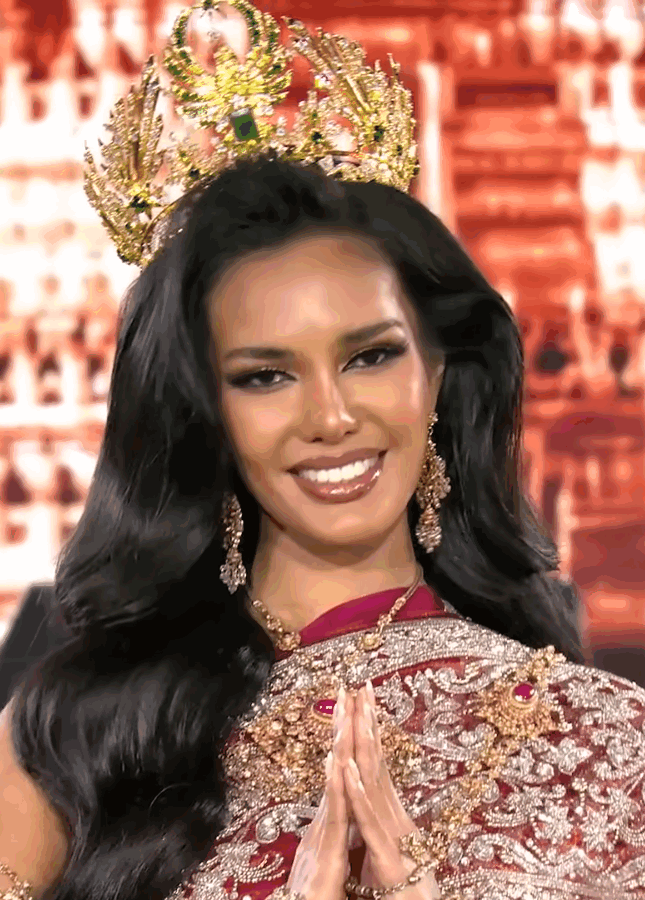
Miss Grand Indonesia 2025
Vina Sitorus,
(Central Kalimantan)

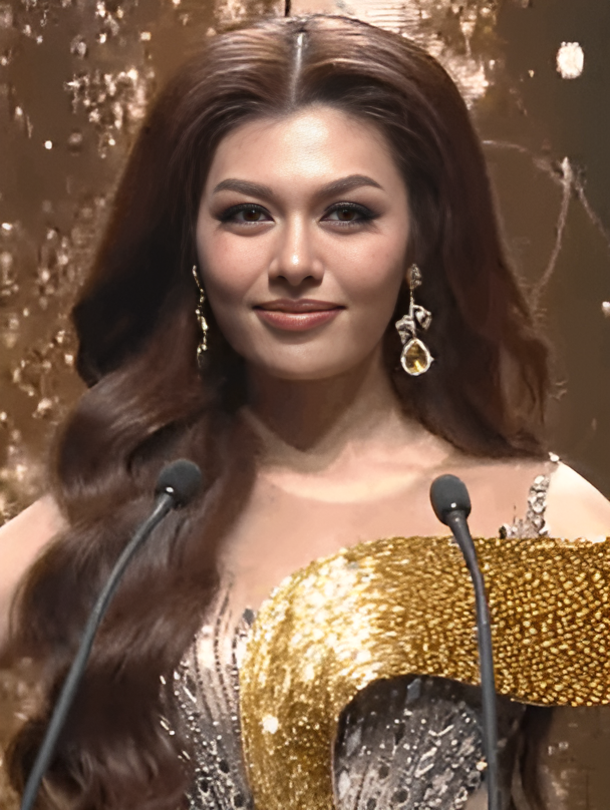
Miss Grand Indonesia 2024
Nova Liana,
(South Sumatra)

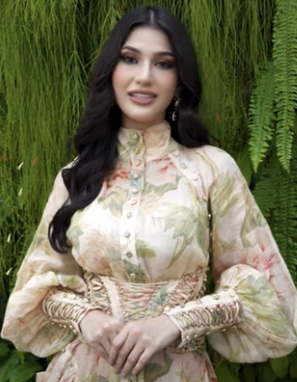
Miss Grand Indonesia 2023
Ritassya Wellgreat,
(South Sumatra)

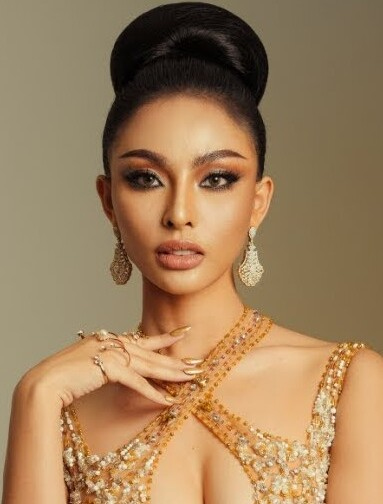
Miss Grand Indonesia 2022
Andina Julie,
(South Sumatra)

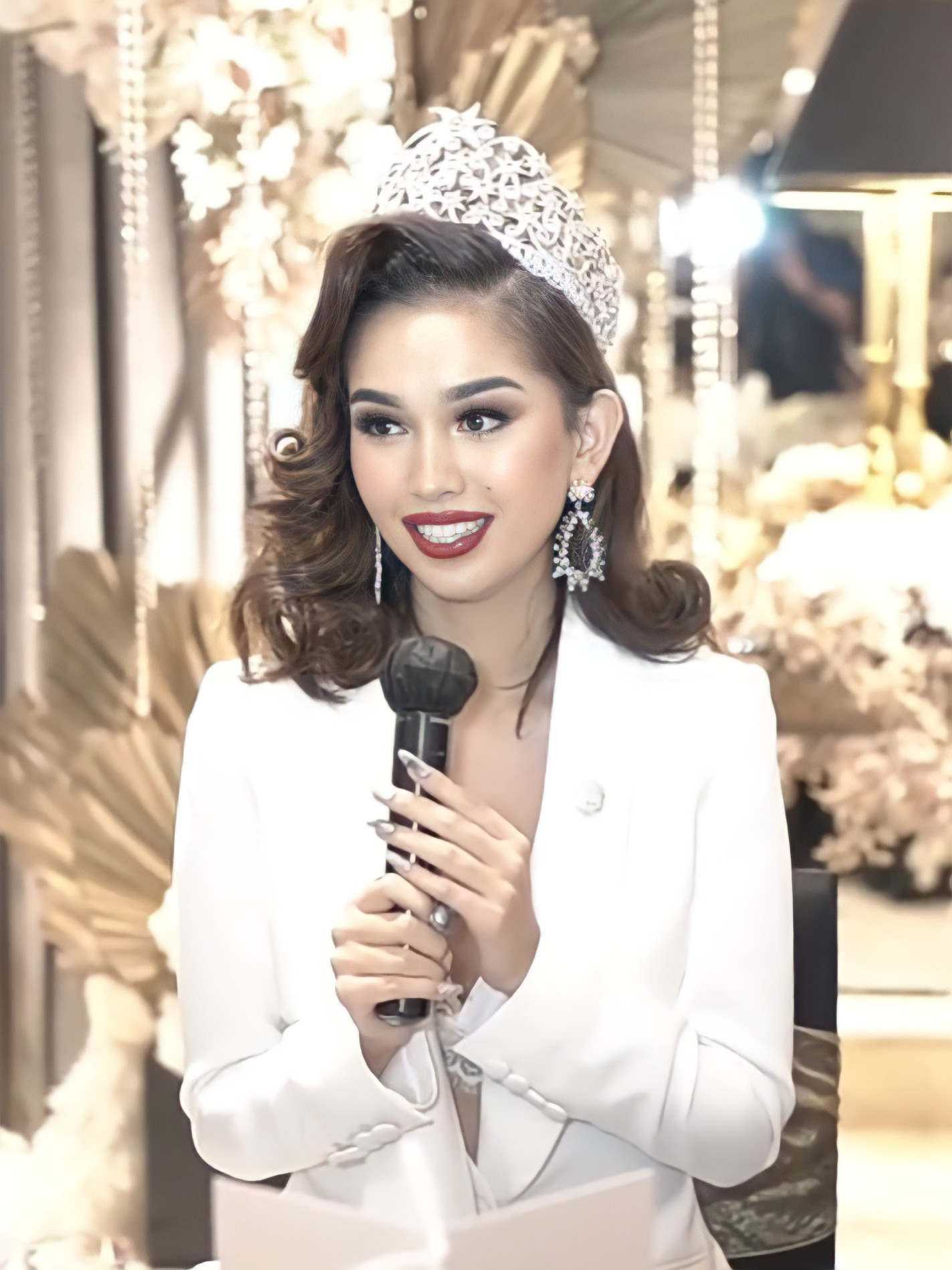
Miss Grand Indonesia 2021
Sophie Rogan,
(Bali)

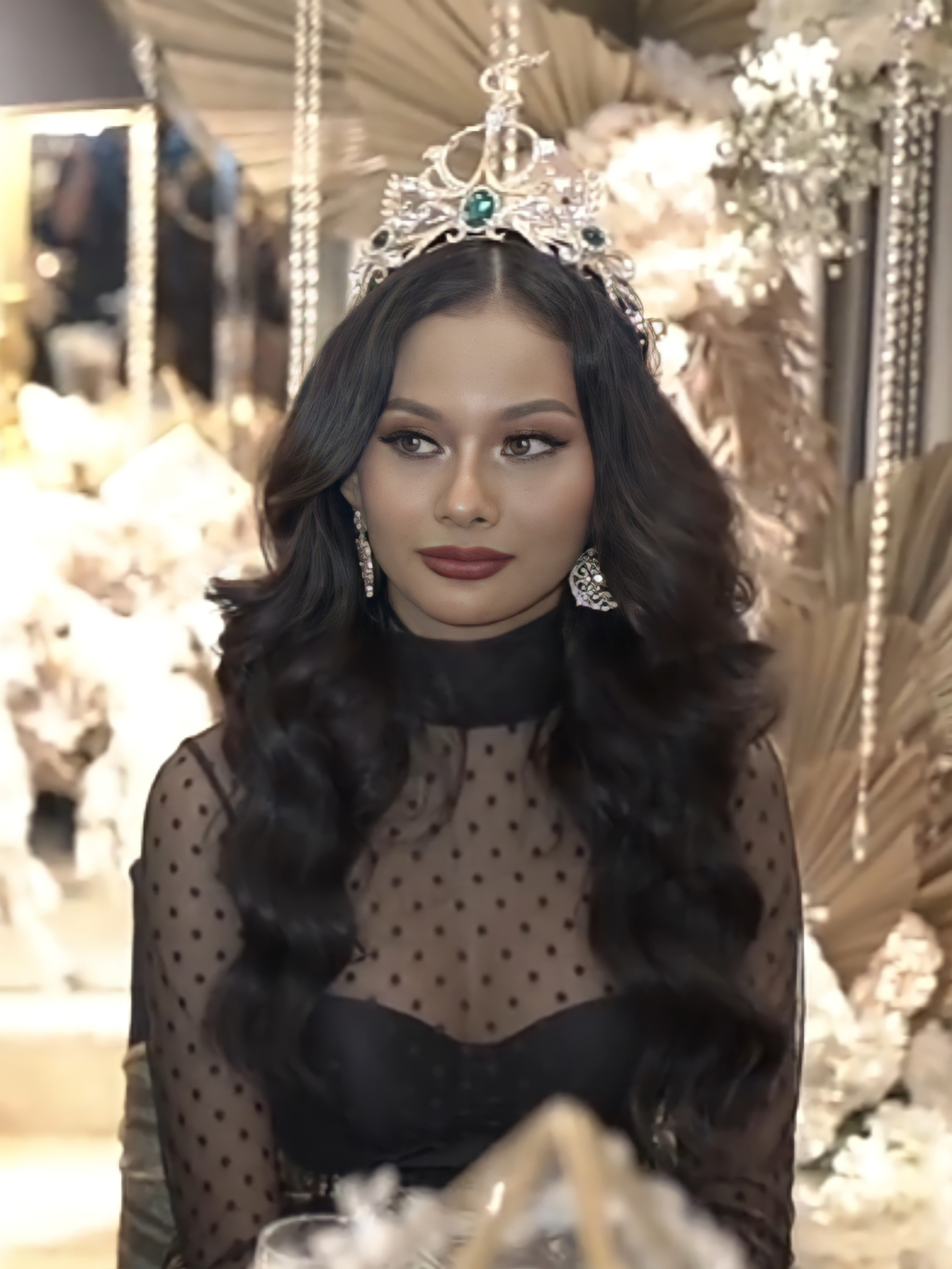
Miss Grand Indonesia 2020
Kharisma Aura,
(West Java)

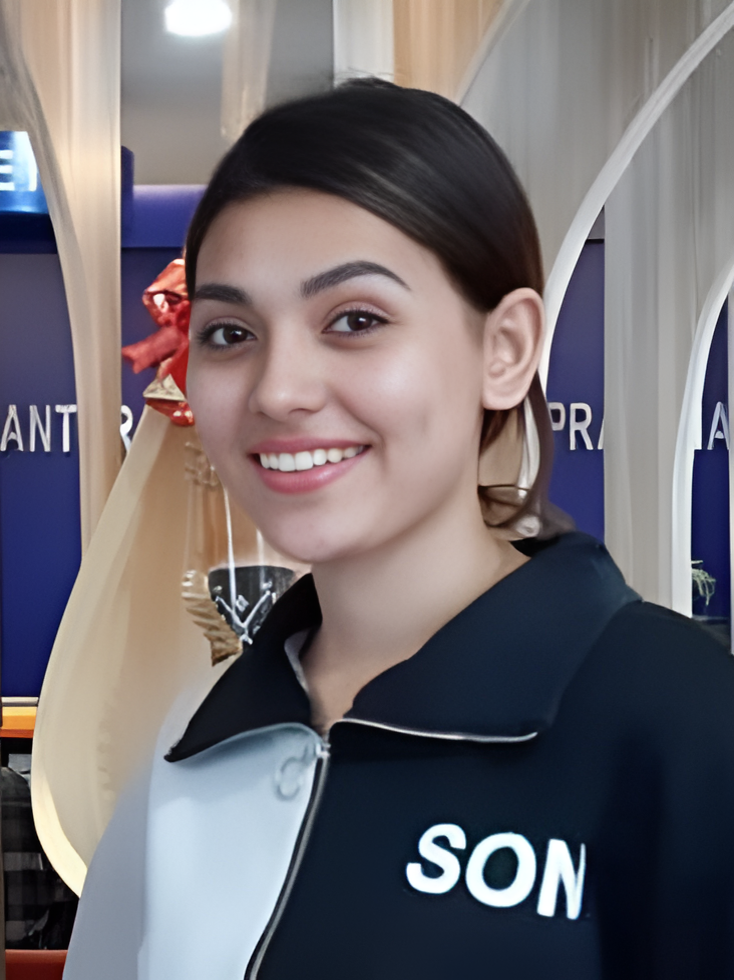
Miss Grand Indonesia 2019
Sarlin Jones,
(East Nusa Tenggara)

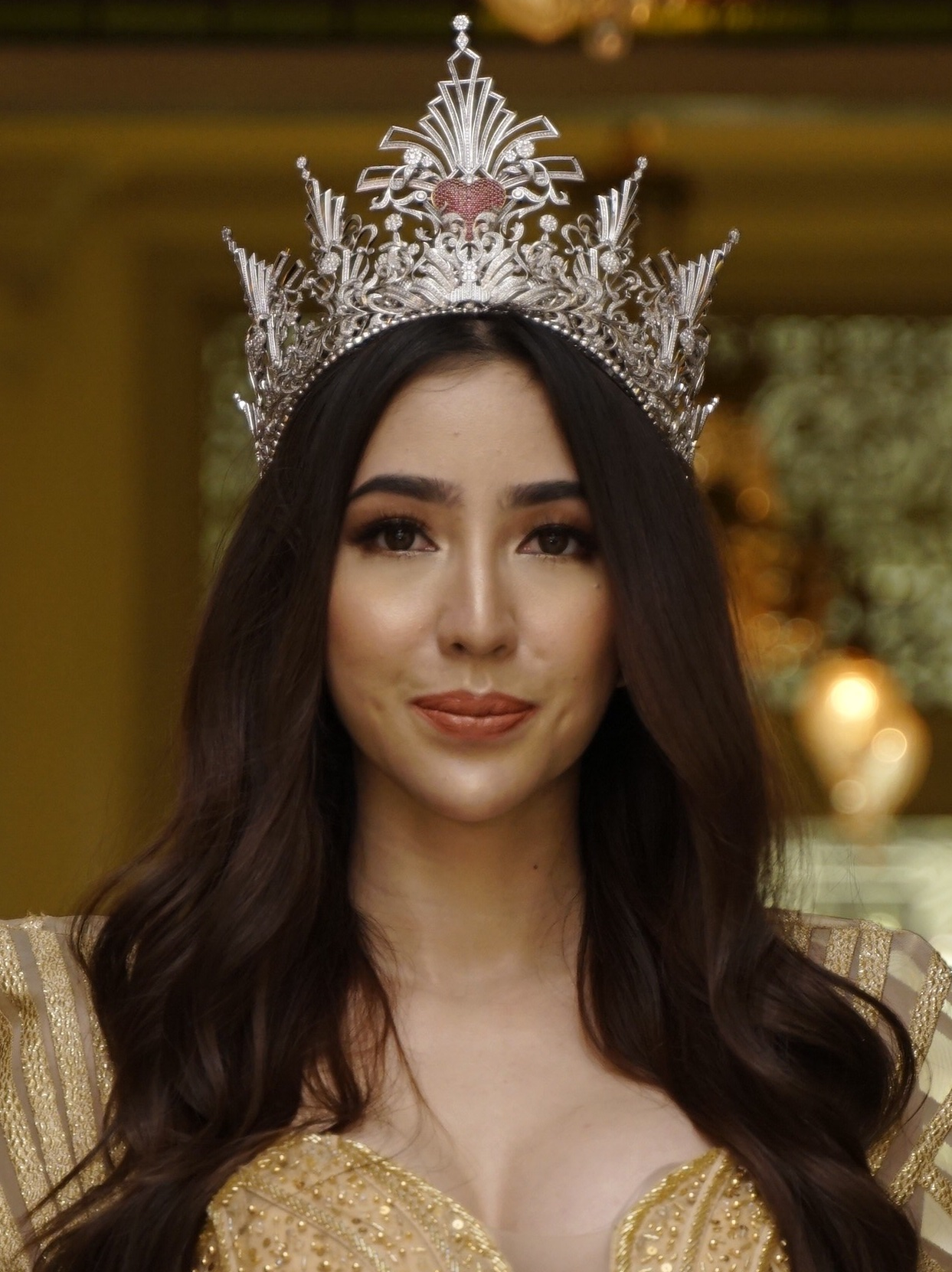
Miss Grand Indonesia 2018
Nadia Sristi Purwoko,
(Bengkulu)

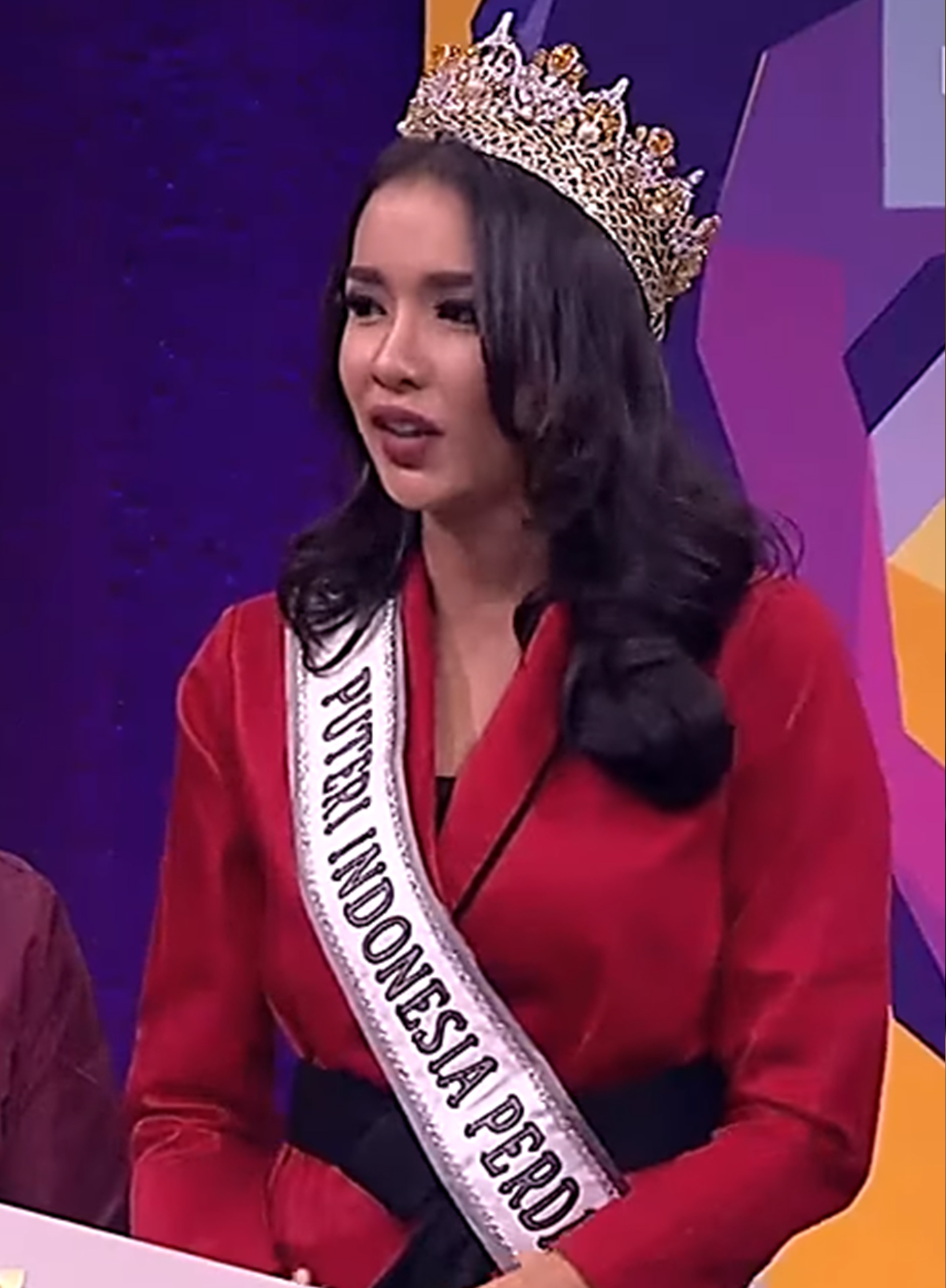
Miss Grand Indonesia 2017
Dea Rizkita,
(Central Java)

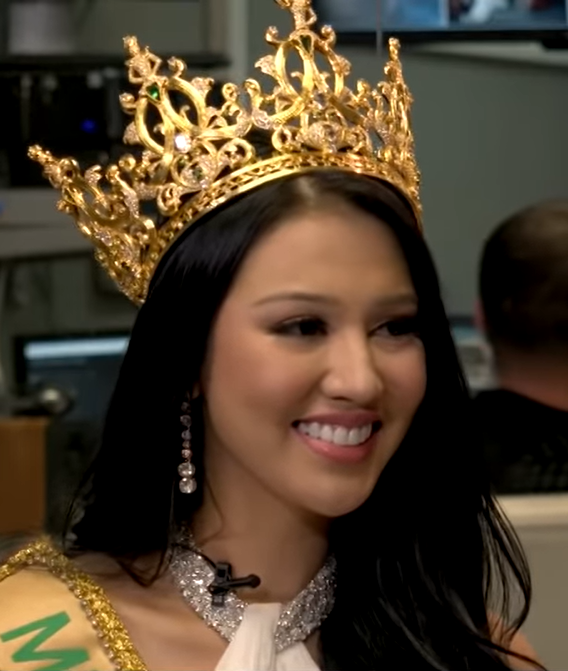
Miss Grand Indonesia 2016
Ariska Putri Pertiwi,
(North Sumatra)
