= JKT48 Janken Competition 2016 =

- Date: 20 July 2016 (ticket selling); 23 July 2016 (preliminary round); 7 August 2016 (drawing); 19 August 2016 (competition proper)
- Location: Balai Sarbini, Jakarta (competition)
- Outcome: Members senbatsu for a single 14th JKT48 "LOVE TRIP"; Sinka (Team KIII) as the winner JKT48 Janken Competition for this first season.

JKT48 Janken Competition 2016 is JKT48's first rock–paper–scissors competition, held at Balai Sarbini, Jakarta on 19 August 2016 to come (which coincides with the celebration of the birthday 23rd Jessica Veranda). This event will decide who will be the "senbatsu" members and center of the 14th JKT48 single to be released in the future.

The event featured a mini concert, and also the final round hosted by Ibnu Jamil who was an actor and presenter (including sports) and referee Valda Rompas, which is part of the MNC Talent Academy, the career event of the reality program "JKT48 Story" in RCTI, as well-trained talent show cooking MasterChef Indonesia 2015.

== What is JKT48 Janken Competition? ==
To be able to senbatsu, all the members JKT48 strive to do each. With the effort, the ability will be honed. With these capabilities, the members strive to provide the best and become senbatsu. In the world of entertainment, one of the important ability is 'good luck'. What if this time senbatsu single JKT48 determined purely on luck? In the JKT48 Janken Competition, the members will be against each other in a match suit – or which in Japanese is called janken. JKT48 Janken Competition held by the autumn tournament system. The outcome of each game is determined only from one suit.

When a member of the suit to win the game, he is entitled to move on to the next round. Participants were followed by members of Team J, KIII, and T. For training students and prospective students will have 5 members training through the preliminary round. This time all members have the same opportunity to win the seat in the single 14th JKT48.

== Outline ==
This event was announced in JKT48 Theater Sementara Surabaya in Team T stage show "Sambil Menggandeng Erat Tanganku" on July 17, 2016 in the Hall of Cak Durasim, Surabaya, East Java.

== Participants ==
The tournament was attended by all members of JKT48, plus a members of training students and prospective students training JKT48 who won the preliminary round local level. Total participants this time as many as 53 people, much less a person than the total participants of the tournament the first time (54). JKT48 members who are automatically eligible to compete in Balai Sarbini without going through the local level of preliminary round.

In the preliminary round among members of trainees and trainee candidates in this event at the JKT48 Theater on July 23, 2016, there were 5 members who qualified for the finals, which were Rissanda Putri Tuarissa (Trainee Candidate), Gabryela Marcelina (Trainee Candidate), Tan Zhi Hui Celine (Trainee), Adriani Elisabeth (Trainee), and Made Ranita Devi Ningtara (Trainee).

At the draw ceremony of JKT48 Janken, which took place on August 7, 2016, 50 members were present to determine the lottery numbers on the participants JKT48 Janken Competition of this year, including four members of trainees and trainee candidates, except Nabilah Ratna Ayu Azalia (Team J), Sendy Ariani (Team J), Saktia Oktapyani (Team KIII), and Rissanda Putri Tuarissa (Trainees).

In the final round of the Competition Janken JKT48 this year, all members participating JKT48, except Rissanda Putri Tuarissa (prospective Trainees) who do not participate in the event due to illness. However, Nabilah (Team J) to re-appear at the event, although his health is not 100% fit.

Rationing representative of JKT48 a commentator from calculations by Angga (Judges), Doni (Judges), and Putri (Assistant host).

== Game rules ==
- The match was held with the knockout.
- The game started call "Jan-ken-pon!", Without preceded call "Saisho wa gu ..." ("From the stone").
- Both players simultaneously show signs hands on the green table in the middle of the ring. If there is any doubt, the winner is decided by looking at the video footage.
- If event of a draw, the game is repeated from the starting position, without appeal "Aiko desho" ("draw").
- Players who waited in showing hand gestures to show signs of an opponent before her olwpwpwn hands is declared as fraudulent.
- Victory canceled when the player wins because earlier had seen a hand gesture of the opponent. If there is any doubt, the winner is decided by looking at the video footage.

== Schedule ==
- July 20, 2016: Start selling ticket Event JKT48 Janken Competition
- July 23, 2016: Preliminary round for Trainee Candidates and Trainees in JKT48 Theater
- August 7, 2016: Drawing even of Janken in JKT48 Theater (after the afternoon show "Pajama Drive" show in progress)
- August 19, 2016: Event JKT48 Janken Competition in Balai Sarbini

== Bracket competition ==
The winner's name is written in bold.

Abbreviation:

- J: Team J
- KIII: Team KIII
- T: Team T
- Tr: Students Training / Trainees
- KTR: Prospective Students Training / Candidate Trainees

=== The preliminary round for Trainees and Candidates Trainee ===
This tournament will take place on July 23, 2016 in JKT48 Theater.

Block	Round 1			Round 2	Round 3	To the finals
Block	No.	Member name	From team	Round 2	Round 3	To the finals
A	1; 2	Sri Lintang; **Rissanda Putri Tuarissa**	Tr; KTr	(road to the third round)	**Rissanda Putri Tuarissa**; Eve Antoinette Ichwan	Rissanda Putri Tuarissa (candidates for students training – 5th generation)
A	3; 4	Sania Julia Montolalu; **Eve Antoinette Ichwan**	KTr; KTr	**Eve Antoinette Ichwan**; Helma Sonya	**Rissanda Putri Tuarissa**; Eve Antoinette Ichwan	Rissanda Putri Tuarissa (candidates for students training – 5th generation)
A	5	Helma Sonya (road to the second round)	KTr	**Eve Antoinette Ichwan**; Helma Sonya	**Rissanda Putri Tuarissa**; Eve Antoinette Ichwan	Rissanda Putri Tuarissa (candidates for students training – 5th generation)
B	1; 2	Puti Nadhira Azalia; **Gabryela Marcelina**	KTr; KTr	(road to the third round)	**Gabryela Marcelina**; Citra Ayu Pranajaya Wibrado	Gabryela Marcelina (candidates for students training – 5th generation)
B	3; 4	**Citra Ayu Pranajaya Wibrado**; Violeta Burhan	KTr; KTr	**Citra Ayu Pranajaya Wibrado**; Regina Angelina	**Gabryela Marcelina**; Citra Ayu Pranajaya Wibrado	Gabryela Marcelina (candidates for students training – 5th generation)
B	5	Regina Angelina (road to the second round)	KTr	**Citra Ayu Pranajaya Wibrado**; Regina Angelina	**Gabryela Marcelina**; Citra Ayu Pranajaya Wibrado	Gabryela Marcelina (candidates for students training – 5th generation)
C	1; 2	**Hasyakyla Utami Kusumawardhani**; Jinan Safa Safira	KTr; Tr	(road to the third round)	Hasyakyla Utami Kusumawardhani; **Tan Zhi Hui Celine**	Tan Zhi Hui Celine (Student training – 4th generation)
C	3; 4	**Cindy Hapsari Maharani Pujiantoro Putri**; Adhisty Zara	Tr; KTr	Cindy Hapsari Maharani Pujiantoro Putri; **Tan Zhi Hui Celine**	Hasyakyla Utami Kusumawardhani; **Tan Zhi Hui Celine**	Tan Zhi Hui Celine (Student training – 4th generation)
C	5	Tan Zhi Hui Celine (road to the second round)	Tr	Cindy Hapsari Maharani Pujiantoro Putri; **Tan Zhi Hui Celine**	Hasyakyla Utami Kusumawardhani; **Tan Zhi Hui Celine**	Tan Zhi Hui Celine (Student training – 4th generation)
D	1; 2	**Adriani Elisabeth**; Ruth Damayanti Sitanggang	Tr; KTr	(road to the third round)	**Adriani Elisabeth**; Zahra Yuriva Dermawan	Adriani Elisabeth (Student training – 4th generation)
D	3; 4	Diani Amalia Ramadhani; **Melati Putri Rahel Sesilia**	KTr; Tr	Melati Putri Rahel Sesilia; **Zahra Yuriva Dermawan**	**Adriani Elisabeth**; Zahra Yuriva Dermawan	Adriani Elisabeth (Student training – 4th generation)
D	5	Zahra Yuriva Dermawan (road to the second round)	Tr	Melati Putri Rahel Sesilia; **Zahra Yuriva Dermawan**	**Adriani Elisabeth**; Zahra Yuriva Dermawan	Adriani Elisabeth (Student training – 4th generation)
E	1; 2	**Chintya Hanindhitakirana Wirawan**; Nurhayati	KTr; KTr	(road to the third round)	Chintya Hanindhitakirana Wirawan; **Made Devi Ranita Ningtara**	Made Devi Ranita Ningtara(Student training – 4th generation)
E	3; 4	Christi; **Elizabeth Gloria Setiawan**	Tr; KTr	Elizabeth Gloria Setiawan; **Made Devi Ranita Ningtara**	Chintya Hanindhitakirana Wirawan; **Made Devi Ranita Ningtara**	Made Devi Ranita Ningtara(Student training – 4th generation)
E	5; 6	Fidly Immanda Azzahra; **Made Devi Ranita Ningtara**	Tr; Tr	Elizabeth Gloria Setiawan; **Made Devi Ranita Ningtara**	Chintya Hanindhitakirana Wirawan; **Made Devi Ranita Ningtara**	Made Devi Ranita Ningtara(Student training – 4th generation)

=== The final round ===
Block	Round 1			Round 2	Round 3	Quarter-Final	Semi-final	Final
Block	No.	Member name	From team	Round 2	Round 3	Quarter-Final	Semi-final	Final
A	1	Devi Kinal Putri (Bye/road to 2nd round)	KIII	**Devi Kinal Putri**; Ratu Vienny Fitrilya	Devi Kinal Putri; **Feni Fitriyanti**	Feni Fitriyanti; **Sinka Juliani**	**Sinka Juliani**; Viviyona Apriani	**Sinka Juliani** (winner); Ni Made Ayu Vania Aurellia
A	2; 3	**Ratu Vienny Fitrilya**; Aninditha Rahma Cahyadi	KIII	**Devi Kinal Putri**; Ratu Vienny Fitrilya	Devi Kinal Putri; **Feni Fitriyanti**	Feni Fitriyanti; **Sinka Juliani**	**Sinka Juliani**; Viviyona Apriani	**Sinka Juliani** (winner); Ni Made Ayu Vania Aurellia
A	4; 5	Ayu Safira Oktaviani; **Feni Fitriyanti**	T T	**Feni Fitriyanti**; Shania Junianatha	Devi Kinal Putri; **Feni Fitriyanti**	Feni Fitriyanti; **Sinka Juliani**	**Sinka Juliani**; Viviyona Apriani	**Sinka Juliani** (winner); Ni Made Ayu Vania Aurellia
A	6; 7	Della Delila; **Shania Junianatha**	KIII; J	**Feni Fitriyanti**; Shania Junianatha	Devi Kinal Putri; **Feni Fitriyanti**	Feni Fitriyanti; **Sinka Juliani**	**Sinka Juliani**; Viviyona Apriani	**Sinka Juliani** (winner); Ni Made Ayu Vania Aurellia
A	8	Amanda Dwi Arista (Bye/road to 2nd round)	T	Amanda Dwi Arista; **Sinka Juliani**	**Sinka Juliani**; Jennifer Rachel Natasya	Feni Fitriyanti; **Sinka Juliani**	**Sinka Juliani**; Viviyona Apriani	**Sinka Juliani** (winner); Ni Made Ayu Vania Aurellia
A	9; 10	**Sinka Juliani**; Cindy Yuvia	KIII; KIII	Amanda Dwi Arista; **Sinka Juliani**	**Sinka Juliani**; Jennifer Rachel Natasya	Feni Fitriyanti; **Sinka Juliani**	**Sinka Juliani**; Viviyona Apriani	**Sinka Juliani** (winner); Ni Made Ayu Vania Aurellia
A	11; 12	Melody Nurramdhani Laksani; **Jennifer Rachel Natasya**	J J	((road to 3rd round))	**Sinka Juliani**; Jennifer Rachel Natasya	Feni Fitriyanti; **Sinka Juliani**	**Sinka Juliani**; Viviyona Apriani	**Sinka Juliani** (winner); Ni Made Ayu Vania Aurellia
A	13	~~Rissanda Putri Tuarissa~~ (disqualified)	KTr	((road to 3rd round))	**Sinka Juliani**; Jennifer Rachel Natasya	Feni Fitriyanti; **Sinka Juliani**	**Sinka Juliani**; Viviyona Apriani	**Sinka Juliani** (winner); Ni Made Ayu Vania Aurellia
B	14 "15"	**Maria Genoveva Natalia Desy Purnamasari Gunawan**; Dena Siti Rohyati	T J	Maria Genoveva Natalia Desy Purnamasari Gunawan; **Viviyona Apriani**	**Viviyona Apriani**; Riskha Fairunissa	**Viviyona Apriani**; Nadhifa Salsabila	**Sinka Juliani**; Viviyona Apriani	**Sinka Juliani** (winner); Ni Made Ayu Vania Aurellia
B	16; 17	Shani Indira Natio; **Viviyona Apriani**	T KIII	Maria Genoveva Natalia Desy Purnamasari Gunawan; **Viviyona Apriani**	**Viviyona Apriani**; Riskha Fairunissa	**Viviyona Apriani**; Nadhifa Salsabila	**Sinka Juliani**; Viviyona Apriani	**Sinka Juliani** (winner); Ni Made Ayu Vania Aurellia
B	18; 19	Beby Chaesara Anadila; **Riskha Fairunissa**	J KIII	**Riskha Fairunissa**; Jennifer Hanna	**Viviyona Apriani**; Riskha Fairunissa	**Viviyona Apriani**; Nadhifa Salsabila	**Sinka Juliani**; Viviyona Apriani	**Sinka Juliani** (winner); Ni Made Ayu Vania Aurellia
B	20	Jennifer Hanna (Bye/road to 2nd round)	KIII	**Riskha Fairunissa**; Jennifer Hanna	**Viviyona Apriani**; Riskha Fairunissa	**Viviyona Apriani**; Nadhifa Salsabila	**Sinka Juliani**; Viviyona Apriani	**Sinka Juliani** (winner); Ni Made Ayu Vania Aurellia
B	21; 22	**Sendy Ariani**; Dwi Putri Bonita	J KIII	**Sendy Ariani**; Saktia Oktapyani	Sendy Ariani; **Nadhifa Salsabila**	**Viviyona Apriani**; Nadhifa Salsabila	**Sinka Juliani**; Viviyona Apriani	**Sinka Juliani** (winner); Ni Made Ayu Vania Aurellia
B	23; 24	Ghaida Farisya; **Saktia Oktapyani**	J KIII	**Sendy Ariani**; Saktia Oktapyani	Sendy Ariani; **Nadhifa Salsabila**	**Viviyona Apriani**; Nadhifa Salsabila	**Sinka Juliani**; Viviyona Apriani	**Sinka Juliani** (winner); Ni Made Ayu Vania Aurellia
B	25; 26	**Nadhifa Salsabila**; Ayana Shahab	T J	**Nadhifa Salsabila**; Gabryela Marcelina	Sendy Ariani; **Nadhifa Salsabila**	**Viviyona Apriani**; Nadhifa Salsabila	**Sinka Juliani**; Viviyona Apriani	**Sinka Juliani** (winner); Ni Made Ayu Vania Aurellia
B	27	Gabryela Marcelina (Bye/road to 2nd round)	KTr	**Nadhifa Salsabila**; Gabryela Marcelina	Sendy Ariani; **Nadhifa Salsabila**	**Viviyona Apriani**; Nadhifa Salsabila	**Sinka Juliani**; Viviyona Apriani	**Sinka Juliani** (winner); Ni Made Ayu Vania Aurellia
C	28	Ni Made Ayu Vania Aurellia (Bye/road to 2nd round)	T	**Ni Made Ayu Vania Aurellia**; Lidya Maulida Djuhandar	**Ni Made Ayu Vania Aurellia**; Gabriela Margareth Warouw	**Ni Made Ayu Vania Aurellia**; Yansen Indiani	**Ni Made Ayu Vania Aurellia**; Adriani Elisabeth	**Sinka Juliani** (winner); Ni Made Ayu Vania Aurellia
C	29; 30	**Lidya Maulida Djuhandar**; Rina Chikano	KIII; KIII	**Ni Made Ayu Vania Aurellia**; Lidya Maulida Djuhandar	**Ni Made Ayu Vania Aurellia**; Gabriela Margareth Warouw	**Ni Made Ayu Vania Aurellia**; Yansen Indiani	**Ni Made Ayu Vania Aurellia**; Adriani Elisabeth	**Sinka Juliani** (winner); Ni Made Ayu Vania Aurellia
C	31; 32	**Gabriela Margareth Warouw**; Shinta Naomi	J J	**Gabriela Margareth Warouw**; Michelle Christo Kusnadi	**Ni Made Ayu Vania Aurellia**; Gabriela Margareth Warouw	**Ni Made Ayu Vania Aurellia**; Yansen Indiani	**Ni Made Ayu Vania Aurellia**; Adriani Elisabeth	**Sinka Juliani** (winner); Ni Made Ayu Vania Aurellia
C	33	Michelle Christo Kusnadi (Bye/road to 2nd round)	T	**Gabriela Margareth Warouw**; Michelle Christo Kusnadi	**Ni Made Ayu Vania Aurellia**; Gabriela Margareth Warouw	**Ni Made Ayu Vania Aurellia**; Yansen Indiani	**Ni Made Ayu Vania Aurellia**; Adriani Elisabeth	**Sinka Juliani** (winner); Ni Made Ayu Vania Aurellia
C	34; 35	**Syahfira Angela Nurhaliza**; Shania Gracia	T T	Syahfira Angela Nurhaliza; **Jessica Vania**	Jessica Vania; **Yansen Indiani**	**Ni Made Ayu Vania Aurellia**; Yansen Indiani	**Ni Made Ayu Vania Aurellia**; Adriani Elisabeth	**Sinka Juliani** (winner); Ni Made Ayu Vania Aurellia
C	36; 37	**Jessica Vania**; Tan Zhi Hui Celine	J Tr	Syahfira Angela Nurhaliza; **Jessica Vania**	Jessica Vania; **Yansen Indiani**	**Ni Made Ayu Vania Aurellia**; Yansen Indiani	**Ni Made Ayu Vania Aurellia**; Adriani Elisabeth	**Sinka Juliani** (winner); Ni Made Ayu Vania Aurellia
C	38; 39	Natalia; **Made Devi Ranita Ningtara**	KIII; Tr	Made Devi Ranita Ningtara; **Yansen Indiani**	Jessica Vania; **Yansen Indiani**	**Ni Made Ayu Vania Aurellia**; Yansen Indiani	**Ni Made Ayu Vania Aurellia**; Adriani Elisabeth	**Sinka Juliani** (winner); Ni Made Ayu Vania Aurellia
C	40	Yansen Indiani(Bye/road to 2nd round)	T	Made Devi Ranita Ningtara; **Yansen Indiani**	Jessica Vania; **Yansen Indiani**	**Ni Made Ayu Vania Aurellia**; Yansen Indiani	**Ni Made Ayu Vania Aurellia**; Adriani Elisabeth	**Sinka Juliani** (winner); Ni Made Ayu Vania Aurellia
D	41	Adriani Elisabeth (Bye/road to 2nd round)	Tr	**Adriani Elisabeth**; Fakhriyani Shafariyanti	**Adriani Elisabeth**; Alicia Chanzia	**Adriani Elisabeth**; Thalia Ivanka Elizabeth	**Ni Made Ayu Vania Aurellia**; Adriani Elisabeth	**Sinka Juliani** (winner); Ni Made Ayu Vania Aurellia
D	42; 43	Nabilah Ratna Ayu Azalia; **Fakhriyani Shafariyanti**	J KIII	**Adriani Elisabeth**; Fakhriyani Shafariyanti	**Adriani Elisabeth**; Alicia Chanzia	**Adriani Elisabeth**; Thalia Ivanka Elizabeth	**Ni Made Ayu Vania Aurellia**; Adriani Elisabeth	**Sinka Juliani** (winner); Ni Made Ayu Vania Aurellia
D	44; 45	**Priscillia Sari Dewi**; Sonia Natalia	KIII; J	Priscillia Sari Dewi; **Alicia Chanzia**	**Adriani Elisabeth**; Alicia Chanzia	**Adriani Elisabeth**; Thalia Ivanka Elizabeth	**Ni Made Ayu Vania Aurellia**; Adriani Elisabeth	**Sinka Juliani** (winner); Ni Made Ayu Vania Aurellia
D	46; 47	**Alicia Chanzia**; Jessica Veranda	KIII; J	Priscillia Sari Dewi; **Alicia Chanzia**	**Adriani Elisabeth**; Alicia Chanzia	**Adriani Elisabeth**; Thalia Ivanka Elizabeth	**Ni Made Ayu Vania Aurellia**; Adriani Elisabeth	**Sinka Juliani** (winner); Ni Made Ayu Vania Aurellia
D	48	Frieska Anastasia Laksani (Bye/road to 2nd round)	J	Frieska Anastasia Laksani; **Thalia Ivanka Elizabeth**	**Thalia Ivanka Elizabeth**; Haruka Nakagawa	**Adriani Elisabeth**; Thalia Ivanka Elizabeth	**Ni Made Ayu Vania Aurellia**; Adriani Elisabeth	**Sinka Juliani** (winner); Ni Made Ayu Vania Aurellia
D	49; 50	**Thalia Ivanka Elizabeth**; Nadila Cindi Wantari	J KIII	Frieska Anastasia Laksani; **Thalia Ivanka Elizabeth**	**Thalia Ivanka Elizabeth**; Haruka Nakagawa	**Adriani Elisabeth**; Thalia Ivanka Elizabeth	**Ni Made Ayu Vania Aurellia**; Adriani Elisabeth	**Sinka Juliani** (winner); Ni Made Ayu Vania Aurellia
D	51; 52	**Haruka Nakagawa**; Stephanie Pricilla Indarto Putri	T T	**Haruka Nakagawa**; Fransisca Saraswati Puspa Dewi	**Thalia Ivanka Elizabeth**; Haruka Nakagawa	**Adriani Elisabeth**; Thalia Ivanka Elizabeth	**Ni Made Ayu Vania Aurellia**; Adriani Elisabeth	**Sinka Juliani** (winner); Ni Made Ayu Vania Aurellia
D	53; 54	**Fransisca Saraswati Puspa Dewi**; Rona Anggreani	T KIII	**Haruka Nakagawa**; Fransisca Saraswati Puspa Dewi	**Thalia Ivanka Elizabeth**; Haruka Nakagawa	**Adriani Elisabeth**; Thalia Ivanka Elizabeth	**Ni Made Ayu Vania Aurellia**; Adriani Elisabeth	**Sinka Juliani** (winner); Ni Made Ayu Vania Aurellia

== Match results ==
Total 'senbatsu' was an experience as a member of senbatsu is calculated from the first single with a major label, "RIVER" to single 13th "Hanya Lihat Ke Depan". Experience singing the B side are not counted.

Winner	No.	Name	Team	Total senbatsu	Record of achievements
1	A-09	Sinka Juliani	Team KIII	–	The center position for the first time featured a single song JKT48
2	C-28	Ni Made Ayu Vania Aurellia	Team T	–	
3	D-41	Adriani Elisabeth	Trainee	–	For the first time, senbatsu positions filled by trainees.
4	B-17	Viviyona Apriani	Team KIII	5	
5	D-49	Thalia Ivanka Elizabeth	Team J	2	
6	C-40	Yansen Indiani	Team T	–	
7	B-25	Nadhifa Salsabila	Team T	–	
8	A-05	Feni Fitriyanti	Team T	–	
9	D-51	Haruka Nakagawa	Team T	13	
10	D-46	Alicia Chanzia	Team KIII	1	
11	C-36	Jessica Vania	Team J	5	
12	C-31	Gabriela Margareth Warouw	Team J	3	
13	B-21	Sendy Ariani	Team J	2	
14	B-19	Riskha Fairunissa	Team KIII	3	
15	A-12	Jennifer Rachel Natasya	Team J	–	
16	A-01	Devi Kinal Putri	Team KIII	12	

== Trivia ==
- JKT48 Member who win Janken Competition single to 14th, has the opportunity to participate in the tournament Janken to be carried out by AKB48 in Kobe World Memorial Hall, Kobe, Prefecture, Japan on October 10, 2016.
- Rezky Wiranti Dhike (Team J) did not participate in this event due to her graduation from JKT48 in September 2016 coming.
- Helma Sonya (Trainee Candidate) attended Trainee and Trainee Candidate qualifying round for "JKT48 Janken Tournament" this year, but unfortunately still not active JKT48 activities.
- Sanda (prospective students training) did not attend the final round of Janken Competition is due to sickness
- During the process janken competition takes place, Jeje (Team J) represented by Michelle (cousin of Jeje).
- Master Senbatsu JKT48 losers/knocked out at this event are:
  - Team J: Ayana, Beby, Veranda, Melody, Nabilah and Shania
  - Team KIII: Yupi and Viny
  - Team T: Michelle
- For the first time in history JKT48, Lisa is a 4th generation member of student training successfully entered senbatsu to the main track on singles JKT48.
- Announcement of the other, there would be grand reshuffle (major overhaul) held at the festival to shake hands (Handshake Festival) from 13th single "Mae Shika Mukanee (Hanya Lihat Kedepan)" on September 11, 2016 in the Granada Ballroom, Menara 165, Jl. TB Simatupang Kav. 1 Cilandak Timur, Pasar Minggu, South Jakarta.
- Senbatsu winners will sing the 14th single JKT48 is "Love Trip" which is the reproduction from the 45th single LOVE TRIP / Shiawase wo Wakenasai AKB48.
