= Miss Grand Indonesia 2019 =

2nd Miss Grand Indonesia pageant

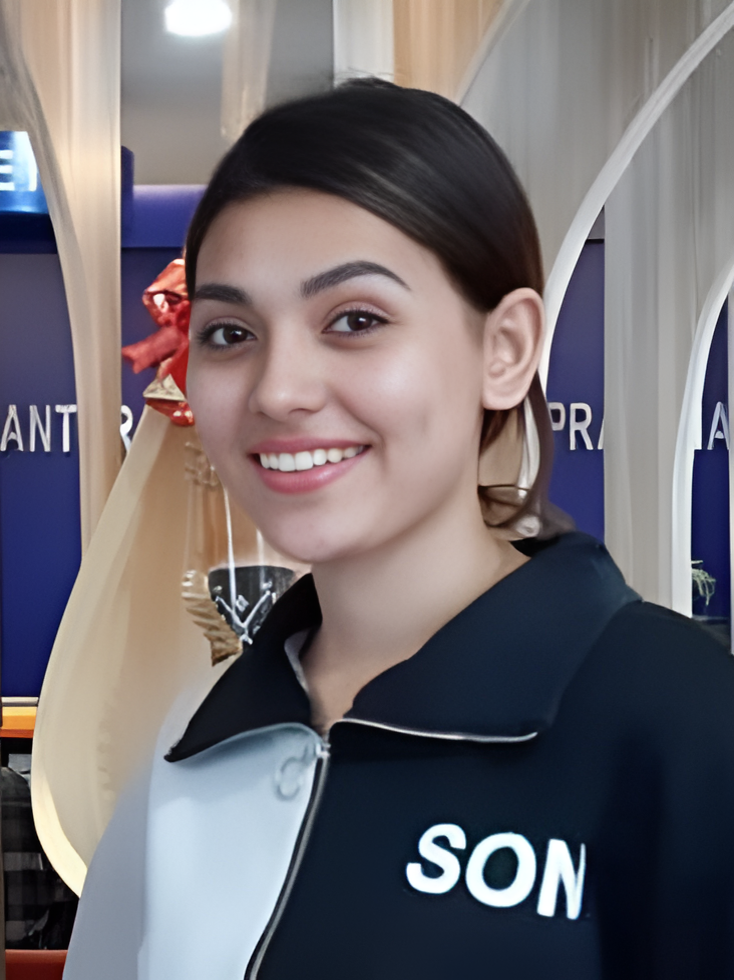
- Sarlin Jones, the winner of the contest
- Date: August 29, 2019
- Venue: Balai Sarbini Hall, Setiabudi, South Jakarta
- Broadcaster: SCTV
- Entrants: 34
- Placements: 10
- Winner: Sarlin Jones (East Nusa Tenggara)
- Congeniality: Sarija S. Ibrahim (North Maluku)

Miss Grand Indonesia 2019 was the second edition of the Miss Grand Indonesia pageant, held on August 29, 2019, at the Balai Sarbini Hall, Setiabudi, South Jakarta. Thirty-four contestants, who qualified for the national stage via regional auditions, competed for the title. 18-year-old Indonesian American freelance model representing East Nusa Tenggara, Sarlin Jones, was announced the winner, while Cindy Yuliani of Bali and Gabriella Hutahaean of North Sumatra were named the first and second runners-up, respectively.

Sarlin later represented Indonesia at the international parent stage, Miss Grand International 2019, held on October 25 that year in Caracas, Venezuela, but was unplaced.

== Background ==
=== Date and venue ===
The pageant preliminary activities happened in two separate sections: firstly in Jakarta from August 19–22, and the last section took place in Labuan Bajo, East Nusa Tenggara, from August 23–26.

=== Selection of contestants ===
The finalists for Miss Grand Indonesia 2019 were determined through either the auditions or provincial preliminary pageants, which were held in Bali and East Java. The winners of the mentioned stages then represented the respective provinces at the national level. Meanwhile, the representatives of the remaining 32 provinces that lacked licensees were determined through an audition held by the central organizer in Jakarta. The qualified contestants were then assigned to represent one of Indonesia's provinces that they were affiliated with.

The following table is the details of the provincial preliminary pageants of Miss Grand Indonesia 2019.

| Pageant | Date and venue | Entrants | Ref. |
|---|---|---|---|
| Miss Grand Bali | February 25, 2019, at the Puri Gangga Resort Sebatu, Tegalalang | 10 | |
| Miss Grand East Java | June 12, 2019, at the Grand Dafam Hotel Surabaya, Surabaya | 12 | |

== Result ==
Miss Grand Indonesia 2019 competition result
Color key:
| Winner | Top 5 |
| 1st runner-up | Top 10 |
| 2nd runner-up | Unplaced |

| Position | Delegate |
|---|---|
| Miss Grand Indonesia 2019 | East Nusa Tenggara – Sarlin Jones |
| 1st runner-up | Bali – Cindy Yuliani |
| 2nd runner-up | North Sumatra – Gabriella Hutahaean |
| Top 5 | West Java – Jessica O. Yoshawirja; North Sulawesi – Mitha Lalujan |
| Top 10 | East Java – Sheryltha Pratyscha; Riau – Puti Pama; South Sumatra – Claudia Wirahadi; West Kalimantan – Ilma Fitrian; Yogyakarta – Erinna Aileen Chrestella |
Special awards
| Best National Costume | North Kalimantan – Hanna Claudia Hutauruk |
| Best Advocacy | West Nusa Tenggara – Sidra Faustina Rahman |
| Miss Talent | Papua – Triza Patricia |
| Miss Congeniality | North Maluku – Sarija S. Ibrahim |
| Miss Popular | North Sulawesi – Mitha Lalujan |

== Contestants ==
Thirty-four contestants competed for the title.

- Aceh – Nanda Izatul Ulfya
- Bali – Cindy Yuliani
- Bangka Belitung Islands – Fransiska Maria Sefani Xu
- Banten – Frisca Melissa
- Bengkulu – Fiola Edwina Asyifa
- Central Java – Verta Arlinsa
- Central Kalimantan – Nathania Khow
- Central Sulawesi – Intan Sunusi
- East Java – Sheryltha Pratyscha
- East Kalimantan – Tasya Yaumil
- East Nusa Tenggara – Sarlin Jones
- Gorontalo – Dela Deni
- Jakarta – Putri Aulia
- Jambi – Adinda Sonia Wulandari
- Lampung – Iin Herma
- Maluku – Yesslin Natalia Kotadiny
- North Maluku – Sarija S. Ibrahim
- North Kalimantan – Hanna Claudia Hutauruk
- North Sulawesi – Mitha Lalujan
- North Sumatra – Gabriella Hutahaean
- Papua – Triza Patricia
- Riau – Puti Pama
- Riau Islands – Lusi Novita
- Southeast Sulawesi – Natalia Johana
- South Kalimantan – Delonix Regina
- South Sulawesi – Miftahul Jannah
- South Sumatra – Claudia Wirahadi
- West Java – Jessica O. Yoshawirja
- West Kalimantan – Ilma Fitrian
- West Nusa Tenggara – Sidra Faustina Rahman
- West Papua – Falin Patandung
- West Sulawesi – Andi Simpur
- West Sumatra – Ega Novrianty
- Yogyakarta – Erinna Aileen Chrestella
