= Ritassya Wellgreat =

Indonesian model and beauty queen (born 2001)

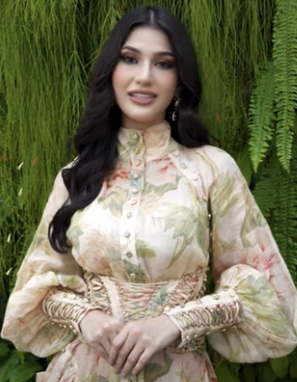
- Ritassya Wellgreat in 2023
- Born: Ritassya Wellgreat Waynands; 30 April 2001 (age 25); Palembang, South Sumatra
- Beauty pageant titleholder
- Title: Miss Mega Bintang Indonesia 2023
- Major competitions: Puteri Indonesia 2019 (Unplaced); Miss Mega Bintang Indonesia 2023 (Winner); Miss Grand International 2023 (5th runner-up)

Ritassya Wellgreat Waynands (born 30 April 2001) also known as Ritassya, is an Indonesian-Netherland beauty pageant title holder, who won Miss Mega Bintang Indonesia. She later participated in Miss Grand International 2023 in Vietnam where she placed as the 5th runner-up

Upon completion of her exclusive contract as brand ambassador for the local skincare brand, Ensee Beauty in mid-2024, Waynands became the new CEO of Ensee Beauty.

Awards and achievements
Preceded by Andina Julie	Miss Grand Indonesia; 2023	Succeeded by Nova Liana
Preceded by (Colombia) Priscilla Londoño (Mauritius) Yuvna Rinishta (Philippines) Roberta Tamondong (Puerto Rico) Oxana Rivera (Spain) Hirisley Jimenez	5th Runner up Miss Grand International; 2023	Succeeded by (Colombia) María Angelica Valero (Curaçao) Akisha Albert (Indonesia) Nova Liana (Malaysia) Melisha Lin (Peru) Arlette Rujel
