= Miss Grand Indonesia 2025 =

4th Miss Grand Indonesia pageant

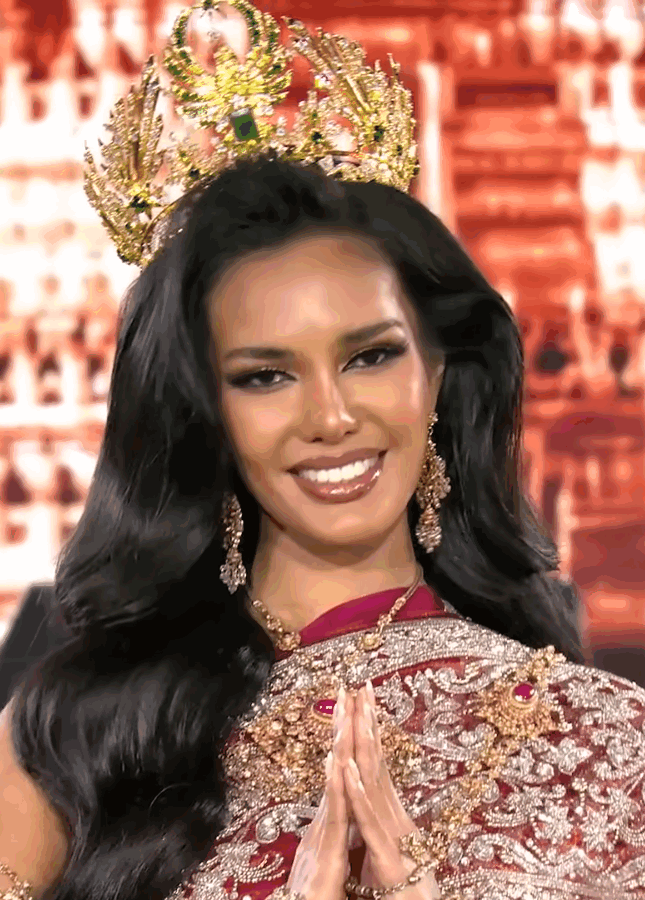
- Vina Sitorus
- Date: 31 August 2025
- Venue: Bengkel Space SCBD, South Jakarta
- Broadcaster: YouTube
- Director: Jonathan Johanes Handoko
- Producer: Yayasan Mahadaya Kemilau Gemintang
- Entrants: 18
- Placements: 11
- Returns: Riau Islands
- Winner: Vina Anggi Sitorus (Kalimantan Tengah)
- Congeniality: Freya Fitriana Galib (Nusa Tenggara Barat)
- Photogenic: Wirda Sheren Regina Simamora (Sumatera Utara)

Miss Grand Indonesia 2025 was the 4th Miss Grand Indonesia pageant, held on 31 August 2025, at the Bengkel Space SCBD in South Jakarta. Contestants from 18 provinces of Indonesia competed for the title.

The contest was won by Vina Sitorus, a 26-year-old model representing Kalimantan Tengah. Vina later represented Indonesia at the Miss Grand International 2025 pageant, held in Thailand on 18 October 2025, where she reached the Top 22.

The edition was the first Miss Grand Indonesia pageant organized by Yayasan Mahadaya Kemilau Gemintang, with an entrepreneur, Jonathan Johanes Handoko, as the director.

== Background ==
=== Location and date ===
From 2020 to 2024, Indonesian representatives to Miss Grand International were selected by Yayasan Dunia Mega Bintang through direct handpicking or the Miss Mega Bintang Indonesia pageant. The franchise was subsequently granted to Yayasan Mahadaya Kemilau Gemintang, headed by Jonathan Johanes Handoko, after Ivan Gunawan, chairman of Yayasan Dunia Mega Bintang, relinquished the license in late 2024. The new licensee then began franchising the competition license to local organizers, who would name their provincial representatives to Miss Grand Indonesia, which was planned to be revived as an individual pageant after a four-year hiatus.

The pageant's press conference with the presentation of the aspirants was conducted on 22 August 2025 at the Gajah Mada Plaza in Jakarta. During the press conference, additional information regarding the competition was presented, encompassing all sub-contests, including the Grand Model round on 27 August. The Bengkel Space SCBD in South Jakarta was later named as the venue for the grand final night held on August 31.

=== Selection of contestants ===
Of all 38 provinces and 1 provincial-level city of Indonesia, only East Java and West Sumatra organized their provincial pageants for this year's edition, details as follows.

Pageant	Edition	Date and venue	Entrants	Ref.
Miss Grand East Java	2nd	25 July 2025 at the Graha Unesa Convention Center, Surabaya	13	
Miss Grand West Sumatra	1st	16 August 2025 at the Rocky Plaza Hotel, Padang	7	

== Results ==
=== Placements ===
Placement	Contestant	Miss Grand Indonesia 2025 competition result by province Color key: Main winner / Supplemental winner; Runners-up / Top 11; Unplaced / Withdrew; No representative
Miss Grand Indonesia 2025	Kalimantan Tengah – Vina Anggi Sitorus	Miss Grand Indonesia 2025 competition result by province Color key: Main winner / Supplemental winner; Runners-up / Top 11; Unplaced / Withdrew; No representative
Miss Globe Indonesia 2025	Bali – Dela Deniyati	Miss Grand Indonesia 2025 competition result by province Color key: Main winner / Supplemental winner; Runners-up / Top 11; Unplaced / Withdrew; No representative
Runner-up	DKI Jakarta II – Sarah Rena Δ §; Jawa Timur – Michelle Gavriele Ferdinandus; Kepulauan Riau – Dewi Aulia Rosano; Sulawesi Utara – Putri Andriani Juficha	Miss Grand Indonesia 2025 competition result by province Color key: Main winner / Supplemental winner; Runners-up / Top 11; Unplaced / Withdrew; No representative
Top 11	DI Yogyakarta – Retna Winedar Oktafia; DKI Jakarta I – Gracia Veronica Agustina; Jawa Barat – Putri Sulistiawati; Nusa Tenggara Barat – Freya Fitriana Galib; Sumatera Utara – Wirda Sheren Regina Simamora	Miss Grand Indonesia 2025 competition result by province Color key: Main winner / Supplemental winner; Runners-up / Top 11; Unplaced / Withdrew; No representative

Δ – Advanced to the Top 6 via public voting
§ – Advanced to the Top 11 via public voting

=== Special awards ===
`

Awards	Contestant
Miss Grand Ekonomi Kreatif	Bengkulu – Vita Apritia Tadila
Miss Grand Photogenic	Sumatera Utara – Wirda Sheren Regina Simamora
Miss Grand Best Social Media	Kalimantan Timur – Nura Fitri Farhana
Miss Grand Fanvote	DKI Jakarta II – Sarah Rena
Miss Grand Favorite	Kalimantan Tengah – Vina Anggi Sitorus
Miss Grand Congeniality	Nusa Tenggara Barat – Freya Fitriana Galib
Miss Grand Best Evening Gown	Riau – Thasya Novianti Putri
Miss Grand Best Social Project	Sulawesi Utara – Putri Andriani Juficha
Miss Grand Best Catwalk	Jawa Timur – Michelle Gavriele Ferdinandus
Miss Grand Best Speaker	DKI Jakarta I – Gracia Veronica Agustina
Miss Grand Most Stylish	DKI Jakarta II – Sarah Rena
Miss Grand Most Standout	Jawa Tengah – Amora Putri Angreini
Miss Grand Best Body	Bali – Dela Deniyati
Miss Grand Beautiful Smile	Jawa Barat – Putri Sulistiawati
Miss Grand Best in Resortwear	DKI Jakarta II – Sarah Rena
Miss Grand Intelligence	DI Yogyakarta – Retna Winedar Oktafia
Grand Voice Award	Riau – Thasya Novianti Putri
Miss Grand Beauty of Peace	DI Yogyakarta – Retna Winedar Oktafia
Miss Grand Best Performance	Sumatera Utara – Wirda Sheren Regina Simamora
Miss Grand Content Creator	Nusa Tenggara Barat – Freya Fitriana Galib
Miss Grand Beautiful Skin	Sulawesi Selatan – Andi We Tenri Sumpala Ugi
Miss Grand Best Arrival	DKI Jakarta II – Sarah Rena
Miss Grand Popularity	Jawa Barat – Putri Sulistiawati
Grand Talent Award	Sumatera Barat – Jihan Rahmatika
Grand Sport Award	Sumatera Utara – Wirda Sheren Regina Simamora
Grand Model Award	Maluku – Tchinda Eliza Piliang

== Contestants ==
The following contestants have been confirmed.

- Bali – Dela Deniyati
- Bengkulu – Vita Apritia Tadila
- DI Yogyakarta – Retna Winedar Oktafia
- DKI Jakarta I – Gracia Veronica Agustina
- DKI Jakarta II – Sarah Rena
- Gorontalo – Olivia Hilmayanti (withdrew)
- Jawa Barat – Putri Sulistiawati
- Jawa Tengah – Amora Putri Angreini
- Jawa Timur – Michelle Gavriele Ferdinandus
- Kalimantan Barat – Kanaya Miracle (withdrew)
- Kalimantan Tengah – Vina Anggi Sitorus
- Kalimantan Timur – Nura Fitri Farhana
- Kepulauan Riau – Dewi Aulia Rosano
- Maluku – Tchinda Eliza Piliang
- Nusa Tenggara Barat – Freya Fitriana Galib
- Riau – Thasya Novianti Putri
- Sulawesi Selatan – Andi We Tenri Sumpala Ugi
- Sulawesi Utara – Putri Andriani Juficha
- Sumatera Barat – Jihan Rahmatika
- Sumatera Utara – Wirda Sheren Regina Simamora
