= Miss Grand Indonesia 2020 =

3rd Miss Grand Indonesia pageant

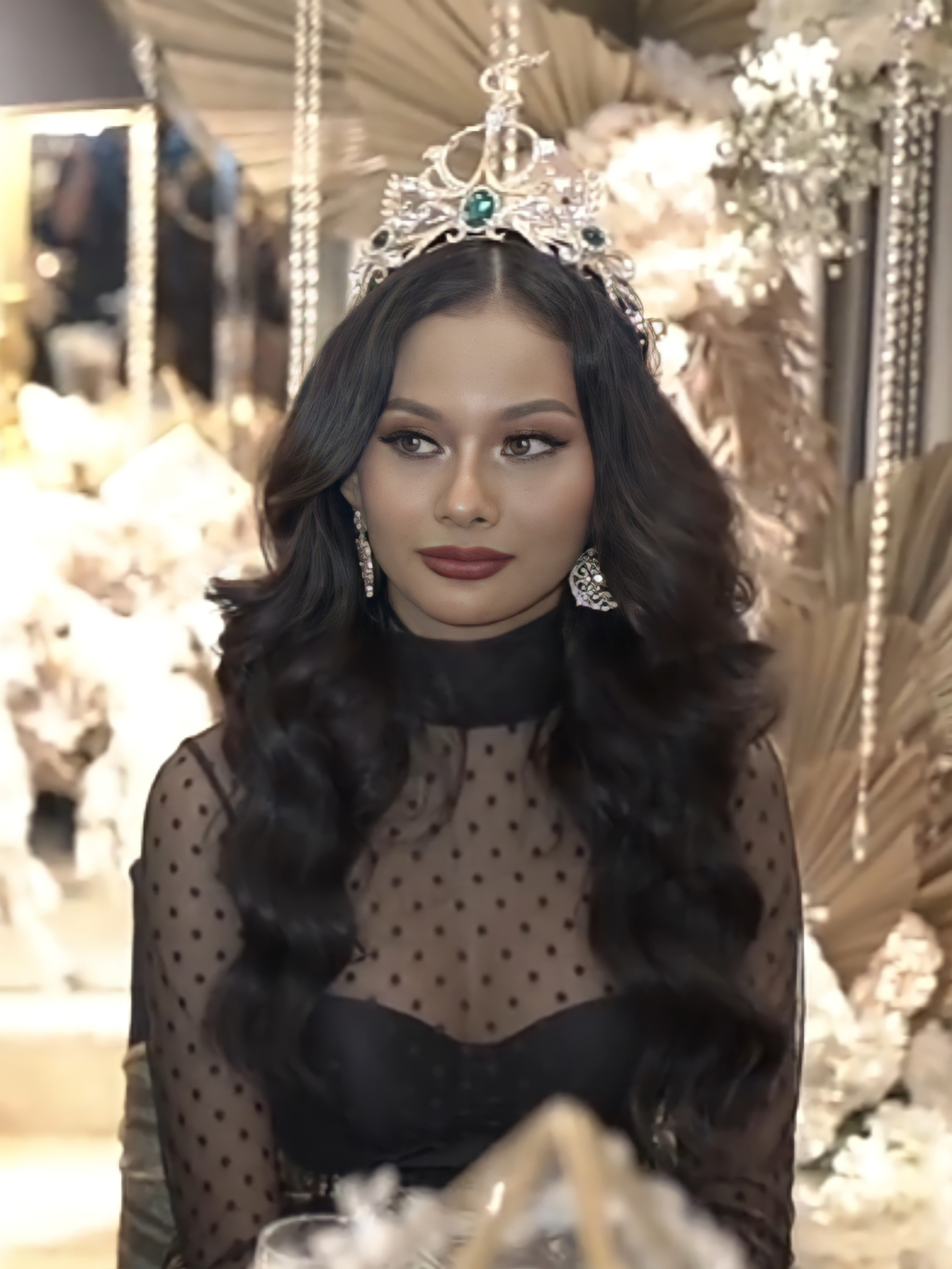
- Kharisma Aura, the winner of the contest
- Date: June 21, 2020
- Venue: Goodrich Suites, Artotel Portfolio, South Jakarta
- Broadcaster: YouTube
- Entrants: 5
- Placements: 2
- Winner: Aurra Kharishma (West Java)
- Congeniality: Jazmine Rowe (Bali)
- Photogenic: Jessica Lagu (East Nusa Tenggara)

External videos
- Grand final coronation

Miss Grand Indonesia 2020 was the third edition of the Miss Grand Indonesia pageant, held on June 21, 2020, at the Goodrich Suites, Artotel Portfolio, South Jakarta. Five contestants, who qualified for the national stage via an audition, competed for the title. Aurra Kharishma, a 20-year-old public relations graduate and model from West Java, was named the winner, and of East Java was the runner-up.

Aurra later represented Indonesia at the international parent stage, Miss Grand International 2020, held on March 27, 2021, in Bangkok, Thailand, where she was named the third runner-up, making her the third Indonesian candidates to qualify for the top 5 finalists in Miss Grand International.

In addition to the main winner, the pageant runner-up, Bella Sant, later appointed Miss Intercontinental Indonesia 2020 and was placed among the top 20 finalists on the international stage, Miss Intercontinental 2020, as well as the top 5 finalists, Nadia Tjoa, who managed to win the international title of Miss Face of Humanity 2022, held in Toronto, Canada, in April 2022.

== Background ==
=== Selection of contestants ===
The semi-finalists for Miss Grand Indonesia 2020 were determined through an online application, where 37 applicants qualified for the second round. Due to the COVID-19 pandemic, the qualified candidates then faced the second screening to limit the number of final contestants to five, who then competed in a reality show format to determine the final winner.

=== Pageant ===
The pageant was organized in a reality-show format from March 13 to April 2, in which the final five candidates faced several challenging events to obtain points. Two episodes of the pageant were telecasted on YouTube under the MOP channel.

The panel of judges, including:

- Ivan Gunawan – National director of Miss Grand Indonesia
- Sarwendah Tan – Artist, singer and entrepreneur
- Junita Liesar – Businessperson
- Nadia Purwoko – 2nd runner-up Miss Grand International 2018
- Ari Tulang – Artist and choreographer
- Arif Budiman – Director of YT Utama Putra
- Devya Linda – Celebrity dentist

== Result ==
Miss Grand Indonesia 2020 competition result
Color key:
Winner	Top 5
Runner-up	Did not compete

Position	Delegate
Miss Grand Indonesia 2020	West Java – Aurra Kharishma
Runner-up	East Java – Bella Sant
Special awards
Miss Congeniality	Bali – Jazmine Rowe
Miss Photogenic	East Nusa Tenggara – Jessica Lagu
Miss Glowing Skin	Jakarta – Nadia Tjoa
Appointed titleholders
Miss Intercontinental Indonesia 2020	East Java – Bella Sant
Miss Face Of Humanity Indonesia 2021	Jakarta – Nadia Tjoa

== Contestants ==
Five contestants competed for the title.

- Bali – Jazmine Rowe
- East Java – Bella Sant
- East Nusa Tenggara – Jessica Lagu
- Jakarta – Nadia Tjoa
- West Java – Aurra Kharishma
