= Balai Sarbini =

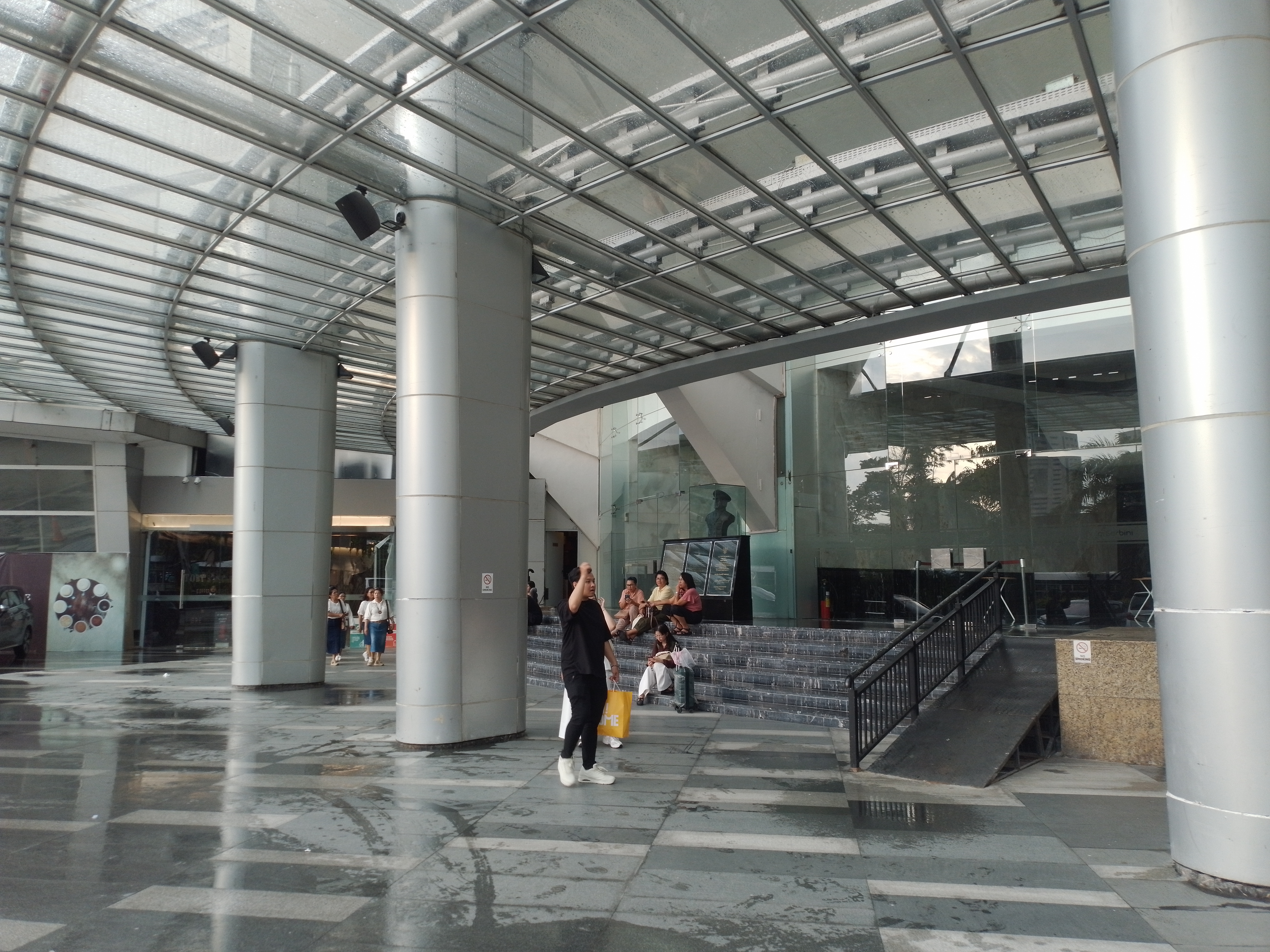
- The lobby area

General information
- Type: Concert/Convention Hall
- Architectural style: Post-war modernism
- Location: Setiabudi, South Jakarta, Jakarta
- Address: Jl. Jendral Sudirman Kav. 52, Jakarta 12930
- Coordinates: 6.219754°S 106.814478°E
- Groundbreaking: January 6, 1965
- Opened: March 11, 1973
- Renovated: 2004
- Owner: PT. Dome Semanggi Indonesia

Design and construction
- Architect(s): Ir. Moerdoko

Other information
- Seating capacity: 1,300 people including 46 VIP seats

Website
- http://www.balaisarbini.com

Balai Sarbini (Indonesian for "Sarbini Hall") is a dome-roofed auditorium and concert hall located in central Jakarta, Indonesia. The building was enveloped by the comprehensive shopping mall, Lippo Mall Nusantara (formerly The Plaza Semanggi).

== History ==
Balai Sarbini and the adjacent Gedung Veteran (Veteran's Building), also known as the Graha Purna Yudha tower, were built by President Sukarno in 1965 for the Veterans’ Legion of Indonesia (LVRI) that was established by Sukarno in 1957 to look after the interests of veterans who had fought against foreign aggression to maintain Indonesia's independence. This initially meant for those who were involved in the 1945-1949 guerilla war against the Netherlands, although later also included the campaign for Irian Jaya (1961-1963) and the Indonesia–Malaysia confrontation (1963-1966).

President Sukarno laid the first stone for Balai Sarbini and Gedung Veteran on January 6, 1965. Funding shortages delayed the project until 1973 when it was opened by President Suharto on March 11, 1973. The architect of the building was Ir. Moerdoko. The name Sarbini was named after Lieutenant General Sarbini (1914-1977) who was in charge of the Ministry of Veteran Affairs and head of the LVRI when the original building project began.

In 2000, after revitalization phase which does not change the structure and the condition of the building, Balai Sarbini appears with “new face”. It is not only historic monumental building but also the most representative place in Jakarta to hold cultural activities. Furthermore, it can also generate revenues for Indonesia.

To enhance its performance as a center for cultural activities, the management of Balai Sarbini invited audio consultants to upgrade the acoustic system inside the Main Hall.

On February 23, 2004, President Megawati Soekarnoputri signed a plaque commemorating inauguration of the new Balai Sarbini.

== Cited works ==
- Merrillees, Scott (2015). Jakarta: Portraits of a Capital 1950-1980. Jakarta: Equinox Publishing. ISBN 9786028397308.
