= Miss Grand Indonesia 2018 =

1st Miss Grand Indonesia pageant

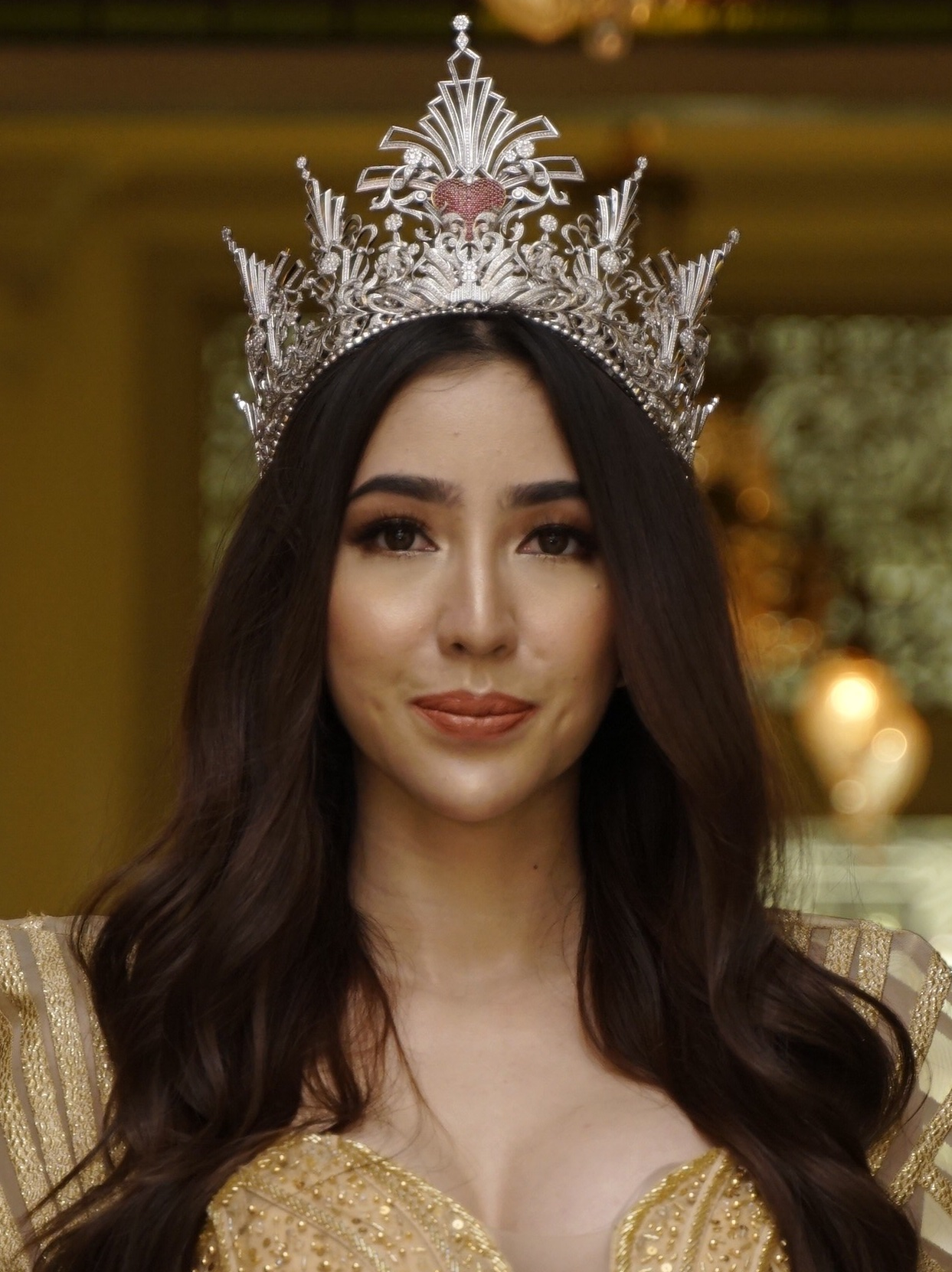
- Nadia Purwoko, the winner of the contest
- Date: July 21, 2018
- Presenters: Evan Sanders; Maya Septha
- Entertainment: Judika; Sheryl Sheinafia; Rizky Febian; Soundwave
- Venue: Jakarta Convention Center, Jakarta, Indonesia
- Broadcaster: SCTV
- Entrants: 30
- Placements: 10
- Winner: Nadia Purwoko (Bengkulu)
- Congeniality: Ni Komang Sri Dian Maya Lestari (West Nusa Tenggara)

External videos
- Grand final coronation

Miss Grand Indonesia 2018 was the first edition of the Miss Grand Indonesia pageant, held on July 21, 2018, at the Jakarta Convention Center, Senayan City, Central Jakarta. Thirty contestants, who qualified for the national stage via regional auditions, competed for the title. A 26-year-old University of Indonesia-graduated model representing Bengkulu, Nadia Purwoko, was announced the winner, while Vivi Wijaya Huang of North Sumatra and Stephanie Cecillia Munthe of Jakarta were named the first and second runners-up, respectively.

Nadia later represented Indonesia at the international parent stage, Miss Grand International 2018, held on October 25 that year in Yangon, Myanmar, where she was named the second runner-up as well as obtained the special title of Best in Social Media Award.

The event was supported by the Ministry of Tourism of Indonesia, Junior Chamber International (JCI), and MarkPlus, Inc., and was broadcast nationwide through a free-to-air television network, SCTV.

== Background ==
=== History ===
After 5 consecutive years of appointing representatives to compete at the Miss Grand International pageant, the first stand-alone Miss Grand Indonesia was scheduled to happen in 2018 following the franchise transfer to a new organizer, Dharma Gantari Foundation. The memorandum of understanding signing ceremony between the international organ and the local franchise holder was held at Indonesia's Ministry of Tourism Office in Jakarta on January 29, 2018.

=== Selection of contestants ===
The finalists for Miss Grand Indonesia 2018 were determined through auditions held in 18 cities countrywide from February to April 2018. The qualified contestants were later assigned to represent one of Indonesia's provinces that they were affiliated with.

== Result ==
Miss Grand Indonesia 2018 competition result
Color key:
Winner	Top 5
1st runner-up	Top 10
2nd runner-up	Unplaced
Did not compete

Position	Delegate
Miss Grand Indonesia 2018	Bengkulu – Nadia Purwoko
1st runner-up	North Sumatra – Vivi Wijaya Huang
2nd runner-up	Jakarta – Stephanie Cecillia Munthe
Top 5	North Sulawesi – Sabrina Malik; West Sumatra – Nada Ferlysia
Top 10	Bali – Putu Ayu Sada Devi Prednyadari; East Java – Rizky Maylina; East Kalimantan – Amel Barack; West Java – Mentari Novel; West Kalimantan – Vegiananda Elyanora Yudhana Putri
Special awards
Best National Costume	Bali – Putu Ayu Sada Devi Prednyadari
Best Evening Gown	North Sumatra – Vivi Wijaya Huang
Miss Congeniality	West Nusa Tenggara – Ni Komang Sri Maya Dian Lestari
Miss Popular	South Sumatra – Putri Azizah Rozi
Miss Perbankan	Lampung – Sevin Dwi Putri

== Contestants ==
Thirty contestants competed for the title.

- Aceh – Eggy Fegri Lindira Putri
- Bali – Putu Ayu Sada Devi Prednyadari
- Bangka Belitung Islands – Kenya Nindia Elsa
- Banten – Brenda Theresia
- Bengkulu – Nadia Purwoko
- Central Java – Bunga Ghassani
- Central Kalimantan – Susan Yuliana
- East Java – Rizky Maylina
- East Kalimantan – Amel Barack
- Jakarta – Stephanie Cecillia Munthe
- Jambi – Rismawati
- Lampung – Sevin Dwi Putri
- Maluku – Angelica Batfutu
- North Kalimantan – Gabrielle Andrianne Assa
- North Sulawesi – Sabrina Malik
- North Sumatra – Vivi Wijaya Huang
- Papua – Deborah Karubabah
- Riau – Diana Hariaty Sinaga
- Riau Islands – Arneta Dwitania
- Southeast Sulawesi – Lupita Randawi
- South Kalimantan – Refiana R Ardini
- South Sulawesi – Rahma Yani
- South Sumatra – Putri Azizah Rozi
- West Java – Mentari Novel
- West Kalimantan – Vegiananda Elyanora Yudhana Putri
- West Nusa Tenggara – Ni Komang Sri Dian Maya Lestari
- West Papua – Hermine Rachael Makanuay
- West Sulawesi – Andini Ika Aprilla
- West Sumatra – Nada Ferlysia
- Yogyakarta – Callista Zahra Aidi
