= Miss Mega Bintang Indonesia =

Annual national beauty pageant competition in Indonesia

- Abbreviation: MMBI
- Named after: Yayasan Dunia Mega Bintang
- Formation: 2023 (as Miss Mega Bintang Indonesia); 2020 (as Miss Grand Indonesia)
- Type: Beauty pageant
- Headquarters: Jakarta
- Location: Indonesia
- Members: TBA
- Official language: Indonesian and English
- National Director: Ivan Gunawan
- Key people: Nawat Itsaragrisil
- Parent organization: Yayasan Dunia Mega Bintang (2020-present)

Miss Mega Bintang Indonesia (previously Miss Grand Indonesia) is a discontinued national beauty pageant in Indonesia that formerly selected the country's representatives in the international beauty pageants namely Miss Grand International and others.

The reigning Miss Mega Bintang Indonesia is Nova Liana from South Sumatra. She represented Indonesia at Miss Grand International 2024.

== History ==
=== Miss Grand Indonesia under Yayasan Dunia Mega Bintang (2020-2022) ===
Since 2020, the president of Miss Grand Indonesia (Yayasan Dunia Mega Bintang) is Ivan Gunawan, Indonesian designer and entertainer. Ivan Gunawan managed the Miss Grand Indonesia 2020 with Aurra Kharisma as Miss Grand Indonesia 2020 and Bella Aprillia Sant as Miss Intercontinental Indonesia 2020. Aurra Kharisma competed at Miss Grand International 2020 and she got 3rd Runner-up. Bella Aprillia Sant competed at Miss Intercontinental 2021 when she placed in the top 20. In April 2021, Yayasan Dunia Mega Bintang announced Nadia Tjoa as Miss Face of Humanity Indonesia 2021 and competed in the inaugural edition of Miss Face of Humanity 2022 and she won. In 2021, Ivan Gunawan appointed Sophia Rogan as Miss Grand Indonesia 2021. Sophia competed at Miss Grand International 2021 when she got the Top 10 placement. In 2022, Ivan Gunawan appointed Andina Julie as Miss Grand Indonesia 2022. Andina competed at Miss Grand International 2022 when she got 2nd Runner-up.

=== Miss Mega Bintang Indonesia (2023-present) ===
In 2023, Yayasan Dunia Mega Bintang announced that it will rebrand the Miss Grand Indonesia pageant to be Miss Mega Bintang Indonesia. The Grand Winner of Miss Mega Bintang Indonesia will compete in Miss Grand International pageant. Yayasan Dunia Mega Bintang also stated that it will send Miss Mega Bintang Indonesia runners-up and select some of the Top 10 finalists to the Miss Face of Humanity, Miss Eco International, Reina Hispanoamericana, World Top Model, Reina Internacional del Cacao, and Miss Aura International pageants. From 2024, Yayasan Dunia Mega Bintang also took the Miss Elite World and Miss Planet International licensees.

== International crowns ==
The following are the Miss Mega Bintang Indonesia titleholders throughout the years, their performance in the international beauty pageants

- One – World Top Model winner: Vania Agustina (2023)

=== Placements at international pageants ===
- 2 placements at Miss Grand International (2023 & 2024). The highest placement is Ritassya Wellgreat and Nova Liana as Top 10 or 5th Runner-up of Miss Grand International 2023 and 2024 respectively.
- 1 placement at Reina Hispanoamericana (2023). The highest placement is Chessy Anribka as Top 12 of Reina Hispanoamericana 2023
- 2 placements at Miss Eco International (2024 & 2025). The highest placement is Yulinar Fitriani as 1st Runner-up of Miss Eco International 2025.
- 3 placements at Miss Aura International (2023–2025). The highest placement is Sahida Sheik as 1st Runner-up of Miss Aura International 2023.
- 1 placement at Miss Planet International (2024). The highest placement is Olla Levina as Vice Miss Planet International 2023 (Miss Angel Planet International 2023)
- 1 placement at Miss Elite (2024). The highest placement is Tawana Sheldrick as 4th Runner-up of Miss Elite 2024
- 1 placement at Miss Face of Humanity (2024). The highest placement is Vanessa Hatter as Top 5 of Miss Face of Humanity 2024.
- 1 placement at Reina Internacional del Cacao (2023). The highest placement is Michelle Ayu as Virreina of Reina Internacional del Cacao 2023 (Reina Internacional del Chocolate 2023)
- 1 placement at World Top Model (2023). The highest placement is Vania Agustina as World Top Model 2023.

== Titleholders ==
Year	Miss Mega Bintang Indonesia	Vice MMBI	Runners-up, in alphabetical order			
2023	Ritassya Wellgreat	Not awarded	Chessy Anribka	Sahida Sheik	Valerie Avril	Vanessa Hatter
2024	Nova Liana	Tawana Sheldrick	Anindya Gupita	Olivia Stevanie	Olla Levina	Yulinar Fitriani

== Winners ==
=== Miss Mega Bintang Indonesia ===
The Grand Winner of Miss Mega Bintang Indonesia pageant will compete in Miss Grand International.

Color Key

- : Declared as Winner
- : Ended as one of the Runner-up
- : Ended as one of the Finalists or 5th Runner-up
- : Ended as one of the Semi-finalists

Year	Province	Miss Mega Bintang Indonesia	International pageants	Placement	Special Awards
2023	South Sumatra	Ritassya Wellgreat	Miss Grand International 2023	5th Runner-up	5 Special Awards: Pre-Arrival; Top 10 - Best in National Costume; Top 10 - Best in Swimsuit; Top 18 - Grand Voice; Top 20 - Country's Power of the Year
2024	South Sumatra 1	Nova Liana	Miss Grand International 2024	5th Runner-up	7 Special Awards: Pre-Arrival; Miss Charming; Miss Popular Vote; Top 10 - Best in National Costume; Top 20 - Best in Swimsuit; Top 30 - Grand Voice; Top 16 - Country's Power of the Year

== Runners-up ==
=== Reina Hispanoamericana Indonesia ===
In 2023, one of runner-up of Miss Mega Bintang Indonesia was appointed for Reina Hispanoamericana beauty pageant.

Year	Province	Reina Hispanoamericana Indonesia	National Title	Placement	Special Awards
2023	North Sulawesi	Chessy Anribka	Runner-up Miss Mega Bintang Indonesia 2023	Top 13	Miss Elegance

=== Miss Eco Indonesia ===
Since 2023, runner-up of Miss Mega Bintang Indonesia will be appointed for Miss Eco International 2024 beauty pageant.

Year	Province	Miss Eco International Indonesia	National Title	Placement	Special Awards
2024	Jakarta	Valerie Avril	Runner-up Miss Mega Bintang Indonesia 2023	4th Runner-up	2 Special Awards: Best Eco Video; Best Catwalk in Resort Wear Prime
2025	West Java 1	Yulinar Fitriani	Runner-up Miss Mega Bintang Indonesia 2024	1st Runner-up	Best Eco Video

=== Miss Aura Indonesia ===
Since 2023, runner-up of Miss Mega Bintang Indonesia will be appointed for Miss Aura International beauty pageant.

Year	Province	Miss Aura International Indonesia	National Title	Placement	Special Awards
2023	South Sumatra	Sahida Sheik	Runner-up Miss Mega Bintang Indonesia 2023	1st Runner-up	
2024	Jakarta 7	Olivia Stevanie	Runner-up Miss Mega Bintang Indonesia 2024	Top 11	Miss Bikini

=== Miss Planet Indonesia ===
Since 2024, Yayasan Dunia Mega Bintang appointed one of the runner-ups of Miss Mega Bintang Indonesia to compete in Miss Planet International beauty pageant.

Year	Province	Miss Planet Indonesia	National Title	Placement	Special Awards
2024	Jakarta 2	Olla Levina	Runner-up Miss Mega Bintang Indonesia 2024	Miss Angle Planet 2024	

=== Miss Elite Indonesia ===
Since 2024, Yayasan Dunia Mega Bintang appointed one of the runner-ups of Miss Mega Bintang Indonesia to compete in Miss Elite beauty pageant.

Year	Province	Miss Elite Indonesia	National Title	Placement	Special Awards
2024	Riau Islands 1	Tawana Sheldrick	Runner-up Miss Mega Bintang Indonesia 2024	4th Runner-up	

=== Miss Face of Humanity Indonesia ===
In 2023, one of runner-up of Miss Mega Bintang Indonesia was selected as Miss Face of Humanity Indonesia.

Year	Province	Miss Face of Humanity Indonesia	National Title	Placement	Special Awards
2024	North Sulawesi	Vanessa Hatter	Runner-up Miss Mega Bintang Indonesia 2023	Top 5	1 Special Awards: MFOH Cares Ambassador 2024

=== World Top Model Indonesia ===
Since 2024, Yayasan Dunia Mega Bintang appointed one of the runner-ups of Miss Mega Bintang Indonesia to compete in World Top Model beauty pageant.

Year	Province	World Top Model Indonesia	National Title	Placement	Special Awards
2024	Yogyakarta Special Region 2	Anindya Gupita	Runner-up Miss Mega Bintang Indonesia 2024	Withdrew - Visa problem	

== Other international representatives ==
=== Miss Aura Indonesia ===
In 2025, Yayasan Dunia Mega Bintang appointed one of finalist of Miss Mega Bintang Indonesia to compete in Miss Aura International beauty pageant.

Year	Province	Miss Aura Indonesia	National Title	Placement	Special Awards
2025	Jakarta	Michelle Ayu	Top 10 Miss Mega Bintang Indonesia 2023	Top 11	Miss National Costume

=== Reina Internacional del Cacao Indonesia ===
In 2023, Yayasan Dunia Mega Bintang appointed one of the Top 10 finalist of Miss Mega Bintang Indonesia to compete in Reina Internacional del Cacao beauty pageant.

Year	Province	Reina del Cacao Indonesia	National Title	Placement	Special Awards
2023	Jakarta	Michelle Ayu	Top 10 Miss Mega Bintang Indonesia 2023	Reina Internacional del Chocolate 2023	

=== World Top Model Indonesia ===
In 2023, Yayasan Dunia Mega Bintang appointed one of the Top 10 finalist of Miss Mega Bintang Indonesia to compete in World Top Model beauty pageant.

Year	Province	World Top Model Indonesia	National Title	Placement	Special Awards
2023	Jakarta	Vania Agustina	Top 10 Miss Mega Bintang Indonesia 2023	World Top Model 2023	

== Indonesia's Placement at Miss Grand International ==
Name of Pageant	Winner	1st Runner-Up	2nd Runner-Up	3rd Runner-Up	4th Runner-Up	Top 10	Top 20	Total Placements
Miss Grand International	2016	-	2018 • 2022	2020	-	2014 • 2017 • 2021 • 2023 • 2024	-	9
Total	(1) Winner	-	(2) 2nd Runner-up	(1) 3rd Runner-up	-	(5) Finalist/5th Runner-up	-	9

== Before Miss Mega Bintang Indonesia and Miss Grand Indonesia Pageants ==
=== Miss Grand International Indonesia ===
Before 2023, Miss Grand International licence was hold by Yayasan Puteri Indonesia (2013, 2016–2017) and El John Pageants (2014–2015). The first ever Miss Grand Indonesia was Novia Indriani Mamuaja (3rd Runner-up Puteri Indonesia 2012-2013). She competed in Miss Grand International 2013 when she got unplaced. The next year, Yayasan Puteri Indonesia lost their licence to El John Pageants. El John Pageants sent 2 representatives in 2014 and 2015 competition.

In 2014, Margenie Winarti marked as the first Miss Grand Indonesia that placed in Top 10 finalist. In 2016, the licence back to Yayasan Puteri Indonesia and Ariska Putri Pertiwi (Puteri Indonesia Perdamaian 2016) got the crown of Miss Grand International 2016 and received the Best in National Costume award. The last Puteri Indonesia that competed in Miss Grand International was Dea Goesti Rizkita when she got the Top 10 position and Best in National Costume. In 2018–2019, under the name Miss Grand Indonesia, Yayasan Dharma Gantari sent 2 representatives until 2020, Ivan Gunawan with Yayasan Dunia Mega Bintang took over the license under the Miss Grand Indonesia Brand. From 2023, Ivan Gunawan made new brand for his pageant called Miss Mega Bintang Indonesia.

Color Key

- : Declared as Winner
- : Ended as Runner-up
- : Ended as one of the Finalists
- : Ended as one of the Semi-finalists

Year	Representative's Name	Province	National Title	Placement	Special Awards
Miss Grand Indonesia under Yayasan Dunia Mega Bintang
2022	Andina Julie	South Sumatra	Miss Grand Indonesia 2022	2nd Runner-up	4 Special Awards: Pre-Arrival; Top 4 - Country' Power of the Year; Top 8 - Best National costumes; Top 10 - Best in Swimsuit
2021	Sophia Rogan	Bali	Miss Grand Indonesia 2021	Top 10	5 Special Awards: Lottery Prizes Event; Miss Global Beauties MGI 2021; Pre-Arrival; Top 3 - Best in Swimsuit; Top 20 - Best in National Costume
2020	Aurra Kharishma	West Java	Miss Grand Indonesia 2020	3rd Runner-up	10 Special Awards: Queen with the Golden Crown; Global Beauties Choice Award; Bare Face in 2.30 minutes; How to eat Thai food in 2 minute; How to get to know you in 1 minute; Pre-Arrival; Top 5 - Country's Choice of the Year; Top 5 - Miss Popular Vote; Top 6 - Best in National Costume; Top 10 - Best in Swimsuit
Miss Grand Indonesia under Yayasan Dharma Gantari
2019	Sarlin Delee Jones	East Nusa Tenggara	Miss Grand Indonesia 2019	Unplaced	5 Special Awards: for Historic Crowns Fashion Show Gala; Pre-Arrival; Top 10 - Best in Swimsuit; Top 10 - Miss Popular Vote; Top 10 - Best in National Costume
2018	Nadia Sristi Purwoko	Bengkulu	Miss Grand Indonesia 2018	2nd Runner-up	5 Special Awards: Best in Social Media; Most-Liked and Shared Official Portrait Photos; Pre-Arrival; Top 10 - Miss Popular Vote; Top 12 - Best in National Costume
Puteri Indonesia
2017	Dea Goesti Rizkita Koswara	Central Java	Puteri Indonesia Perdamaian 2017	Top 10	5 Special Awards: Best in National Costume; Miss Popular Vote; Official Portraits; Pre-Arrival; Top 10 - Best in Swimsuit
2016	Ariska Putri Pertiwi	North Sumatra	Puteri Indonesia Perdamaian 2016	Miss Grand International 2016	3 Special Awards: Best in National Costume; Miss Grand Slam; 1st Runner-up - Miss Popular Vote
Putri Pariwisata Indonesia
2015	Yolanda Viyanditya Remetwa	Maluku	Miss Green Tourism Indonesia 2014	Unplaced	2 Special Awards: Top 10 - Miss Popular Vote; Top 20 - Best in National Costume
Miss Earth Indonesia
2014	Margenie Winarti	Riau	Miss Earth Indonesia - Air 2014	Top 10	3 Special Awards: Best in Evening Gown; Top 20 - Best in National Costume; Top 25 - Best in Swimsuit
Puteri Indonesia
2013	Novia Indriani Mamuaja	North Sulawesi	Puteri Indonesia 2013 - 3rd Runner-up	Unplaced	

=== Miss Eco International Indonesia ===
Below are the Indonesian representative to the Miss Eco International pageant before Miss Mega Bintang Indonesia pageants according to the year in which they participated. The special awards received and their final placements in the aforementioned global beauty competition are also displayed.

Year	Province	Miss Eco International Indonesia	National Title	Placement	Special Awards
2016	West Papua	S. Olvah Alhamid	Top 5 Puteri Indonesia 2015	Top 16	Best in National Costume
2017	West Sumatra	Annisa Ananda Nusyirwan	Miss Earth Indonesia 2014	Top 10	
2018	Jakarta SCR	Astira Intan Vernadeina	Miss Sport Tourism Indonesia 2017	1st Runner-up	Best Tourism Video
2019	Banten	Ratu Vashti Annisa	Miss Earth Indonesia 2018	Top 10	Best Eco Dress
2020	No pageant held				
2021	Banten	Intan Wisni Permatasari	Miss Earth Indonesia 2017 Contestant	Top 10	
2022	Jambi	Jessica Grace Harvery	Putri Lingkungan Indonesia 2021	Top 21	1st Runner-up Best Talent
2023	North Sulawesi	Angela Shannon Farren Tumbol	Putri Bumi Indonesia Air 2021	Unplaced	2nd Runner-up Best Talent; 2nd Runner-up Best Eco Dress

=== Miss Intercontinental Indonesia ===
Before 2020, Miss Intercontinental licence was hold by El John Pageants (2014–2019).

Year	Province	Miss Intercontinental Indonesia	National Title	Placement	Special Awards
2014	Jakarta SCR	Ilona Cecilia Budiman	Miss Earth Indonesia - Fire 2014	Unplaced	
2015	Southeast	Yovita Iskandar	Miss Earth Indonesia - Air 2015	Unplaced	Best National Costume
2016	North Sumatra	Dani Wulandari	Miss Sport Tourism Indonesia 2015	Unplaced	
2017	North Sulawesi	Alicia Beverly Weley	Miss Earth Indonesia - Air 2017	Unplaced	
2018	Jakarta SCR	Aluna Rifani	Miss Earth Indonesia - Air 2018	Unplaced	Social Media Star
2019	Jakarta SCR	Hillary Tasya Medina	Miss Earth Indonesia - Eco Tourism 2019	Unplaced	

== See also ==
- Miss Grand International
- Puteri Indonesia
- Puteri Indonesia Perdamaian
- Miss Earth Indonesia
- Putri Pariwisata Indonesia
