= Kwashiorkor =

Severe protein malnutrition

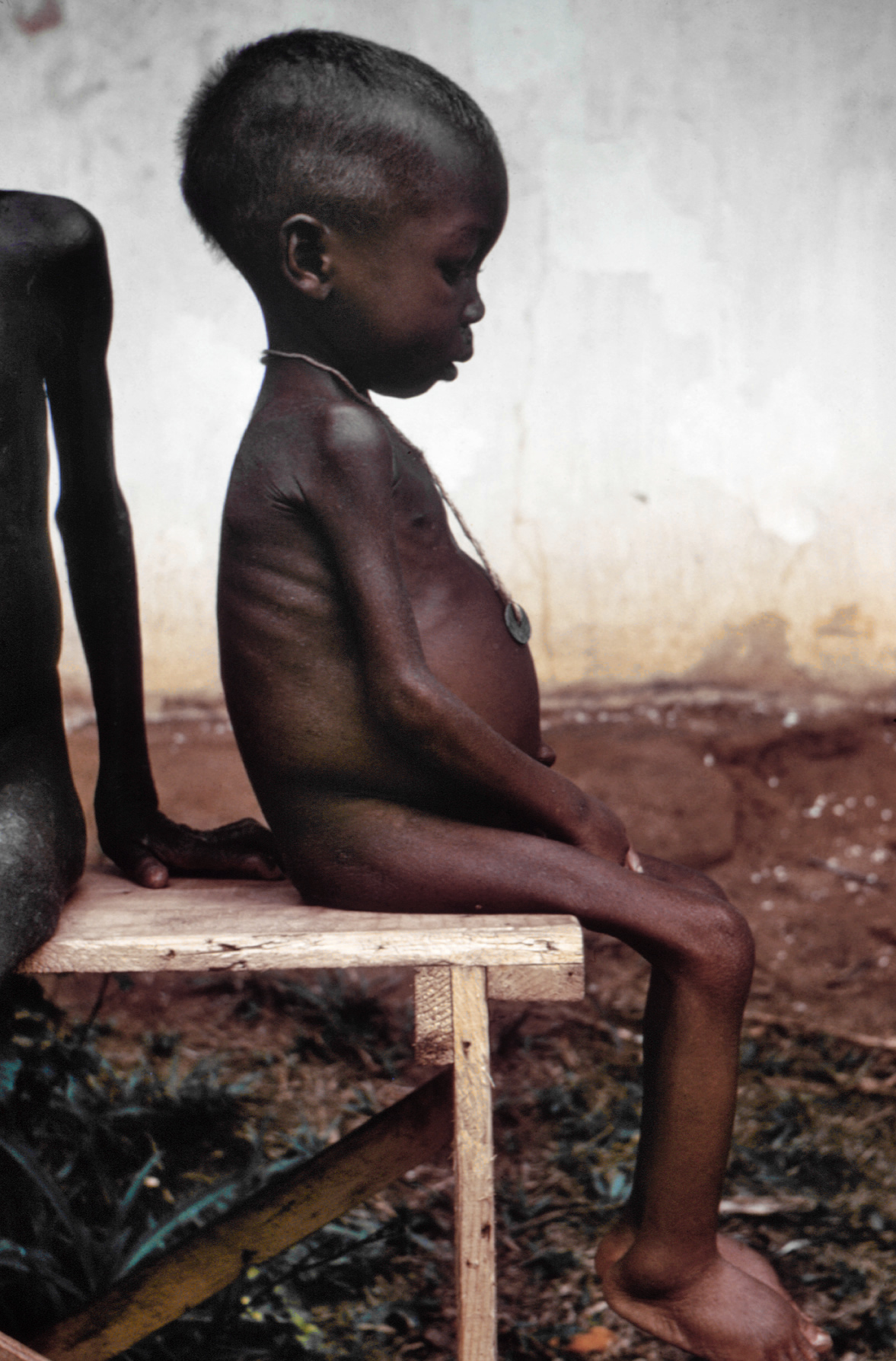
- A young girl with kwashiorkor in a relief camp during the blockade of Biafra
- Specialty: Pediatrics

Kwashiorkor (/ˌkwɒʃiˈɔːrkɔːr, -kər/ KWOSH-ee-OR-kor, -kər) is a form of severe protein malnutrition characterized by edema and an enlarged liver with fatty infiltrates. It is thought to be caused by insufficient protein consumption (or lack of good quality protein) despite adequate calorie intake. It is different from marasmus, which is malnutrition of all sources of energy including protein. Recent studies have found that a lack of antioxidant micronutrients such as β-carotene, lycopene, other carotenoids, and vitamin C as well as the presence of aflatoxins may play a role in the development of the disease. However, the precise causes of kwashiorkor are not fully understood. It is most often associated with inadequate food supply. In at-risk populations, it is most likely to develop after infants or children are weaned from breast milk, which contains amino acids vital to a child's growth, and begin consuming a diet high in carbohydrates, including maize, cassava, or rice. Occurrences in high-income countries are rare, and tend to be associated with chronic malabsorptive disorders such as cystic fibrosis.

Conditions analogous to kwashiorkor have been documented around the world throughout history. The disease's first formal description was published by Jamaican pediatrician Cicely Williams in 1933. She was the first to research kwashiorkor, and to suggest that it might be a protein deficiency to differentiate it from other dietary deficiencies. The name, introduced by Williams in 1935, was derived from the Ga language of coastal Ghana, translated as "the sickness the baby gets when the new baby comes" or "the disease of the deposed child", and reflecting the development of the condition in an older child who has been weaned from the breast when a younger sibling comes.

== Classification ==
Kwashiorkor is a type of severe acute malnutrition (SAM). SAM is a category, composed of two conditions: marasmus and kwashiorkor. Both kwashiorkor and marasmus fall under the umbrella of protein–energy malnutrition (PEM). These diseases are oftentimes discussed together, but are distinctly separate conditions of malnutrition. Kwashiorkor is marked by an array of metabolic disturbances of uncertain cause. In contrast, marasmus is more clearly an energy deficiency syndrome, marked by weight loss. On physical exam, kwashiorkor is also distinguished from marasmus by the presence of edema. When children present with both kwashiorkor and marasmus, the condition is referred to as "marasmic-kwashiorkor". In general, kwashiorkor is marked by more profound serum depletions of antioxidant molecules and minerals, relative to marasmus.

=== Wellcome's classification ===
Wellcome classification is a system for classifying protein-energy malnutrition in children based on weight for their age and based on presence of edema. Other classifications include Gomez classification and Waterlow classification.

Weight for age	With edema	Without edema	General considerations
65-85%	Kwashiorkor	Undernutrition	Weight for age ± oedema; Reference standard (50th percentile)
<60%	Marasmic kwashiorkor	Marasmus	Weight for age ± oedema; Reference standard (50th percentile)

== Signs and symptoms ==
The defining sign of kwashiorkor in children is bilateral edema in the feet. Edema may also involve the hands, trunk, and face. Kwashiorkor is characterized by a fatty liver. This fatty liver of the undernutrition phenotype is often accompanied by evidence of inflammation and fibrosis. Whereas a fatty liver of undernutrition is a consistent feature of kwashiorkor, it is only encountered sometimes in children with marasmus. In addition to this characteristic hepatic steatosis, kwashiorkor is marked by a parallel pattern of multi-organ dysfunction. Organs often affected in children with kwashiorkor include the kidneys, pancreas, heart, and nervous system. Other findings that may be encountered on physical exam include a distended abdomen, hair thinning, loss of teeth, skin or hair depigmentation, and dermatitis. Children with kwashiorkor often develop irritability and anorexia. Generally, kwashiorkor is treated by introducing a high-quality source of protein to the diet. Ready-to-use therapeutic food (RUTF) as well as F-100 and F-75 milk powders, which both include skim milk powder, are recommended for the treatment of kwashiorkor. These products are designed for use in low-resource settings. The limited number of kwashiorkor cases that occur in high resource settings, where there is good access to advanced therapeutic tools, are typically treated with partially hydrolyzed or elemental enteral formulas, with parenteral nutrition provided in extreme cases.

=== Differential Diagnosis ===
While Kwashiorkor is primarily characterized by edema, growth failure, and dermatitis, it can sometimes be misdiagnosed as Acrodermatitis Enteropathica (AE), as both conditions present with similar dermatological symptoms. However, AE is caused by zinc deficiency, not protein deficiency, and is associated with a significant decrease in serum zinc levels. Unlike kwashiorkor, which is diagnosed based on clinical signs like edema and low serum albumin levels, AE requires additional diagnostic tests, such as zinc uptake tests and genetic screening, to differentiate it from other disorders with similar symptoms. Therefore, while both conditions can present with dermatitis, the underlying etiology helps distinguish the two.

== Causes ==
The precise etiology of kwashiorkor remains unclear. Several hypotheses have been proposed that are associated with and explain some, but not all aspects of the pathophysiology of kwashiorkor. They include, but are not limited to protein deficiency causing hypoalbuminemia, amino acid deficiency, oxidative stress, and gut microbiome changes.

=== Low protein intake ===
Disability-adjusted life years per 100,000 inhabitants for protein-energy malnutrition in 2002: no data fewer than 10 10–100 100–200 200–300 300–400 400–500 500–600 600–700 700–800 800–1000 1000–1350 more than 1350

Kwashiorkor is a severe form of malnutrition associated with a low-protein diet. The extreme lack of protein causes an osmotic imbalance in the gastrointestinal system causing swelling of the gut diagnosed as an edema or retention of water.

Extreme fluid retention observed in individuals suffering from kwashiorkor is accompanied by irregularities in the lymphatic system as well as disruptions of capillary exchange. The lymphatic system serves three major purposes: fluid recovery, immunity, and lipid absorption. Victims of kwashiorkor commonly exhibit reduced ability to recover fluids, immune system failure, and low lipid absorption. Fluid recovery by the lymphatic system is accomplished by the re-vascularization of fluid and macromolecules from the interstitial space, allowing these constituents of whole blood to be returned to the venous circulation. Compromised fluid recovery may contribute to the phenomenon of extravascular fluid accumulation in kwashiorkor.

The low protein theory for the pathogenesis of kwashiorkor has been used to teach that capillary exchange between the lymphatic system and circulating blood is impaired by a reduced oncotic (i.e. colloid osmotic pressure, COP) in the blood, as a consequence of inadequate protein intake, so that the hydrostatic pressure gradient, which favors extravasation of fluid from small vessels, is not overcome. Proteins, mainly albumin, are responsible for creating the COP observed in the blood and tissue fluids. The difference in the COP of the blood and tissue tends to favor the reentry of fluid from the extravascular space, into the circulatory system. This tendency is opposed by the venous hydrostatic pressure, which tends to favor the exit of fluid from small vessels, into the interstitial space. The low protein theory for the pathogenesis of kwashiorkor held that a deficiency of serum proteins, caused by inadequate protein intake, disrupted this balance, and thus impaired the return flow of fluid from the interstitium into the capillary and venous structures. It has been taught that this is what accounts for the accumulation of extravascular fluid in kwashiorkor, and the subsequent pedal edema and abdominal distension.

The low protein theory, which relies heavily upon Starling's theory for the movement of fluid in biological systems, provided a compelling rationale for the pathogenesis of edema in kwashiorkor. What it does not explain, however, is the entire array of disturbances that define the kwashiorkor syndrome. These include irritability, anorexia, skin desquamation, skin depigmentation, hair discoloration, reduced mitochondrial respiration, impaired lipid export from the liver without an accompanying reduction of lipoprotein synthesis, 'oxidative stress', glutathione depletions, transsulfuration disturbances, diffuse DNA hypomethylation, immune dysfunction, decreased transmethylation activity, and sulfated glycosaminoglycan deficiencies. It is now generally acknowledged that by itself, the low protein theory does not adequately account for the pathogenesis of kwashiorkor. More complex deficiencies are at work. These have still not been established.

Social factors are also relevant and ignorance of nutrition can be a cause. A case was described where parents who fed their child cassava failed to recognize malnutrition because of the edema caused by the syndrome and thought the child was well-nourished despite the development of kwashiorkor.

=== Aflatoxins ===
Recent studies have attempted to pinpoint a relationship between kwashiorkor and high levels of aflatoxins. Aflatoxins are naturally occurring toxins produced by the mold Aspergillus flavus, a fungus found in areas with hot and humid climates. These toxins tend to grow and can be found in agricultural crops such as millet, maize, and rice. An analysis found that the presence of aflatoxins was found more frequently and in higher concentrations in individuals with kwashiorkor when compared to individuals with marasmus (another form of severe acute malnutrition). In particular, biological samples showed greater levels of aflatoxins in the brain, heart, kidney, liver, lungs, serum, stool, and urine. Aflatoxins were not found in liver samples of individuals with marasmus. It has been known that the liver organ is the main target of aflatoxins and chronic toxicity can result in immunosuppressive and carcinogenic effects. However, there is currently conflicting evidence to pinpoint a connection between kwashiorkor and aflatoxins. Studies have shown that not all children with kwashiorkor present with detectable aflatoxin levels. It has also been proposed that damage done by aflatoxins may be due to glutathione depletion (another proposed mechanism of the disease) in children with kwashiorkor.

== Mechanisms ==
=== Peripheral edema and hypoalbuminemia ===
Kwashiorkor is a form of protein deficiency, which can result in both osmotic imbalances and irregularities in the lymphatic system.

Kwashiorkor is most notable for peripheral edema. The presence of edema in kwashiorkor is correlated with very low albumin concentration (hypoalbuminemia). Edema results from a loss of fluid balance between the hydrostatic and oncotic pressures across the capillary blood vessel walls due to the lack of protein which affects the body's ability to draw fluid from the tissues into the bloodstream. Low albumin concentration influences negatively the strength of oncotic pressure. Failure leads to fluid buildup in the abdomen, resulting in edema and belly distension.

Furthermore, the release of antidiuretic hormone is stimulated by hypovolemia, also leading to the development of peripheral edema. Plasma renin is also stimulated, promoting sodium retention.

It is important to distinguish the pathophysiology of marasmus and kwashiorkor when it comes to treating malnourished children who may have hypovolemic shock that is caused by an acute loss of salt and water. Children with severe albumin deficiency struggle physiologically to maintain their blood volume.

=== Low glutathione levels ===
Kwashiorkor is also marked by low glutathione levels. Glutathione is used in many of the body processes on a molecular level.

It is believed to be related to high oxidant levels commonly seen in people who suffer from starvation and rarely in chronic inflammation. Glutathione serves vital functions including management of oxidative stress which is an imbalance that plays a key role in the pathogenesis of many diseases.

Evidence indicates that amino acid balance has an important effect on protein nutrition and therefore on glutathione homeostasis.

Cysteine is an essential amino acid that acts as the limiting amino acid for glutathione synthesis in humans. Factors that increase demand for glutathione may increase demand for cysteine, and hence methionine. Such demands have been hypothesized to increase the risk for kwashiorkor.

=== Others ===
A proposed experimental theory suggests that alterations in the microbiome/virome contribute to edematous malnutrition, but further studies are required to understand the mechanism.

== Diagnosis ==
Kwashiorkor, or edematous malnutrition, like many other malnutrition diseases, is indirectly assessed using anthropometry. Kwashiorkor is a subtype of severe acute malnutrition (SAM) characterized by bilateral peripheral pitting edema. According to the World Health Organization, the SAM diagnosis parameters are a "mid-upper arm circumference (MUAC) of < 115 mm, weight-for-height/length Z-score (WHZ) of < -3Z and nutritional edema or any combination of these parameters." Additional clinical findings on physical exam include marked muscle atrophy, abdominal distension, dermatitis, and hepatomegaly.

WHO criteria for clinical assessment of malnutrition are based on the degree of wasting (MUAC), stunting (weight-for-height Z-score), and the presence of edema (mild to severe).

In addition to anthropometric measures, laboratory tests can be critical for diagnosing kwashiorkor. Low serum albumin levels (hypoalbuminemia) are a hallmark of protein deficiency, and elevated liver enzymes may indicate liver dysfunction. Electrolyte imbalances and blood tests may also be used to assess the degree of organ involvement and complications.

Specifically in children, severe malnutrition, such as kwashiorkor, can lead to notable changes in brain function and behavior. Children with kwashiorkor tend to be irritable and may develop cerebral atrophy, whereas those with severe wasting frequently show apathy, reduced movement, and speech delays. These neurological and behavioral changes are key factors in the clinical assessment of malnutrition.

== Screening ==
Because it can be difficult to measure weight-for-height Z scores (WHZ) frequently, screening is performed by physical exam, with careful examination of the child's feet to detect the presence of bilateral pitting edema. Screening for edema is essential for the diagnosis of kwashiorkor, since nearly two-thirds of kwashiorkor cases do not have evidence of acute wasting (i.e. mid-upper arm circumference (MUAC) < 125 mm, or WHZ < -2) when diagnosed with kwashiorkor.

== Prevention ==
As for the prevention of childhood malnutrition, there needs to be public health changes such as improving agriculture and improving access to healthcare to effectively reduce the rates of malnutrition in children. By educating individuals of childbearing age on proper nutrition and health during and after pregnancy, they can provide their children with the appropriate nutrients from a young age. By ensuring they are equipped with the proper education and resources, caretakers and infants are in better health, ultimately preventing childhood malnutrition.

Because edema can hide decreased muscle mass, it can be hard to diagnose kwashiorkor in young children; however, if cases are overlooked, children become more susceptible to infections and can ultimately lead to morbidity and mortality. To prevent this from happening, parents can be educated on proper nutrition and the importance of breastfeeding infants to ensure they receive all the nutrients they need.

A diet rich in carbohydrates, fats that provide at least 10% of the total caloric needs, and proteins that provide 15% of the caloric needs can prevent kwashiorkor.

Proteins can be found in the following foods

- Seafood
- Peas
- Nuts
- Seeds
- Eggs
- Lean meat or fish
- Beans

== Treatment ==
WHO guidelines outline 10 general principles for the inpatient management of severely malnourished children.

1. Treat/prevent hypoglycemia
2. Treat/prevent hypothermia
3. Treat/prevent dehydration
4. Correct electrolyte imbalance
5. Treat/prevent infection
6. Correct micronutrient deficiencies
7. Start cautious feeding
8. Achieve catch-up growth
9. Provide sensory stimulation and emotional support
10. Prepare for follow-up after recovery

Both clinical subtypes of severe acute malnutrition (kwashiorkor and marasmus) are treated similarly. Upon initial treatment, children with kwashiorkor may experience weight loss as their edema resolves. Therefore, after concerns of refeeding syndrome have passed, children may require 120-140% of their estimated caloric needs to achieve catch-up growth.

The cause, type, and severity of malnutrition determine what type of treatment would be most appropriate. For primary acute malnutrition, children with no complications are treated at home and are encouraged to either continue breastfeeding (for infants) or start using ready-to-use therapeutic foods (for children). For secondary acute malnutrition, the underlying cause needs to be identified to appropriately treat children. Only after the primary disease is determined can an appropriate dietary plan be made, as fluid, vitamins, and macronutrients may need to be considered to not exacerbate the cause of malnutrition. For example, it is important to recognize that supplementation with key micronutrients like vitamin A, zinc, and iron may be necessary for children during recovery. Micronutrient deficiencies are common in malnourished children and contribute to immune dysfunction. Specific vitamin A supplementation is particularly important for preventing further damage to the liver and skin.

Ready-to-use therapeutic foods (RUTFs) and F-75 and F-100 milks were created to provide appropriate nutrition and caloric intake to those experiencing malnutrition. F-75 milk would be ideal when trying to reintroduce food into a malnourished person, and F-100 milk would be used to aid in weight gain. While RUTFs and F-100 milk were made to have the same nutritional value, RUTFs are beneficial as they are dehydrated and do not require much preparation.

It is also important to note that infections are common in children with severe malnutrition and can further complicate treatment. Routine antibiotics, even in the absence of clinical infection, are generally given as a prophylactic measure, especially in regions with a high risk of infectious diseases. However, due to concerns about antibiotic resistance, there is debate over their routine use.

== Prognosis ==
Kwashiorkor is associated with a high risk of mortality and long-term complications. Treatment under the guidelines of the World Health Organization has proven to reduce this mortality risk and affected children tend to recover faster than children with other severe malnutrition diseases. However, physical and intellectual capabilities are not fully restored. Growth stunting and chronic disruption of microbiota are commonly observed after recovery.

A high risk of death is identified by a brachial perimeter < 11 cm or by a weight-for-age threshold < −3 z-scores below the median of the WHO child growth standards. In practice, malnourished children with edema are suffering from potentially life-threatening severe malnutrition.

== Epidemiology ==
Kwashiorkor is rare in high-income countries. It is mostly observed in low-income and middle-income nations and regions such as Southeast Asia, Central America, Congo, Ethiopia, Puerto Rico, Jamaica, South Africa, and Uganda, where poverty is prominent. Occurrences of severe malnutrition also tend to trend higher under conditions of food insecurity, higher prevalence of infectious diseases, lack of access to appropriate care, and poor living situations with inadequate sanitation. Communities experiencing famine are affected the most, especially during the rainy season. Prevalence varies, but it affects children of either sex commonly under five years old. "Globally, kwashiorkor indirected accounted for 53% of deaths among children under five between 2000 and 2003 when associated with other common childhood diseases like acute respiratory infections, malaria, measles, HIV/AIDS and other causes of perinatal deaths."

When compared to marasmus in developing countries, kwashiorkor typically has a lower prevalence, "0.2%-1.6% for kwashiorkor and 1.2%-6.8% for marasmus." Factors such as "diet, geographical locations, climate, and aflatoxin exposure" have been invoked as potential causes for observed differences in the prevalence of kwashiorkor and marasmus.

In general, in areas where Severe Acute Malnutrition (SAM) is prevalent, marasmus is more often the dominant SAM condition. However, in certain areas, kwashiorkor may be more common than marasmus.

== History ==
Kwashiorkor was present in the world long before 1933 when Cicely Williams published research that took the Ga name for the disease. There were already many names for the illness which referenced the cessation of breastfeeding, or the consumption of monotonous diets high in starch. However, Williams was the first to suggest that this might be a deficiency of protein or an amino acid. Despite publishing in 1933, it was only in 1949 that the World Health Organization officially recognized kwashiorkor as a public health concern. This period also correlated with the promotion of infant formula, often by European colonial powers. The substitution of formula for breastmilk contributed significantly to the increasing visibility of kwashiorkor throughout the twentieth century. Cicely Williams later described the promotion of formula as "the most criminal form of sedition, and that those deaths should be regarded as murder." These arguments underpinned the 1970s Nestlé boycott.

== Effects on pharmacokinetics ==
Those experiencing poverty-related infectious diseases (PRDs) such as malaria and tuberculosis are also likely to be malnourished. Malnutrition can affect the pharmacokinetics of various drugs used to treat PRDs by changing a drug's bioavailability, distribution, and elimination. To optimize the treatment of those diseases, there needs to be more research into how severe malnutrition, specifically kwashiorkor, can affect treatment response.

== Research directions ==
Current research and recommendations to manage severe acute malnutrition (SAM), such as kwashiorkor, in children, are largely based on expert opinions. Only one-third of the WHO guidelines for the management of SAM are based on epidemiological and clinical research. Further studies are needed to "improve treatment outcomes in the large number of children with SAM."

== See also ==
- Anemia
- Emaciation
- Marasmus
- Protein poisoning
- Starvation
