= Malnutrition in children =

Malnutrition in children is covered by multiple articles:

- Undernutrition in children
- Childhood obesity
