= Fortisip =

Therapeutic food produced by Nutricia

Nutritional value per 200ml
- Energy: 1,250 kJ (300 kcal)
- Carbohydrates: 36.8 g
- Sugars lactose: 13.4 g < 0.05 g
- Dietary fibre: 0 g (Note: The chocolate flavour has 0.6 g of fibre)
- Fat: 11.6 g
- Saturated: 1.2 g
- Monounsaturated: 7 g
- Polyunsaturated omega−3 omega−6: 3.4 g 0.65 g 2.75 g
- Protein: 12 g
Vitamins and minerals
Vitamins	Quantity %DV^{†}
Vitamin A equiv.	27% 246 μg
Thiamine (B1)	38% 0.46 mg
Riboflavin (B2)	37% 0.48 mg
Niacin (B3)	34% 5.4 mg
Pantothenic acid (B5)	32% 1.6 mg
Vitamin B6	31% 0.52 mg
Folate (B9)	20% 80 μg
Vitamin B12	27% 0.64 μg
Choline	20% 110 mg
Vitamin C	33% 30 mg
Vitamin D	11% 2.2 μg
Vitamin E	25% 3.8 mg
Vitamin K	13% 16 μg
Minerals	Quantity %DV^{†}
Calcium	14% 182 mg
Copper	60% 0.54 mg
Iron	27% 4.8 mg
Magnesium	11% 46 mg
Manganese	43% 1 mg
Phosphorus	12% 156 mg
Potassium	11% 318 mg
Selenium	31% 17.2 μg
Sodium	8% 180 mg
Zinc	33% 3.6 mg
- Other constituents: Quantity
- Water: 156 ml
- ^{†}Percentages estimated using US recommendations for adults, except for potassium, which is estimated based on expert recommendation from the National Academies.

Fortisip is a therapeutic food manufactured/produced by Nutricia. It is a readymade milkshake style drink for special medical purposes. Intended for the dietary management of patients with or at risk of developing disease related malnutrition, suitable for oral or tube feeding use. Fortisip is suitable for use as a sole source of nutrition when taken as directed by a medical professional for most people over 6 years of age, but it contains no fibre.

Fortisip contains proteins and the vitamins, minerals and trace elements needed for a nutritionally complete diet. Each 200 ml Fortisip bottle provides 300 Kcal (1260 kJ). It does not contain gluten or lactose, making it suitable for people with coeliac disease or lactose intolerance. It is not suitable for people with galactosemia, or as a partial source of nutrition for children under the age of 3.

Fortisip is available in neutral, apricot, mocha, vanilla, strawberry, orange, banana, tropical fruits, chocolate and caramel flavours. Whilst Fortisip compact comes in 8 varieties, neutral is not considered a real flavour and therefore Fortisip compact collectively comes in seven flavours.

It is also offered in a 'Compact Fibre' Version to offer a greater fibre intake across a person's diet, along with a 'Compact Protein' Version to offer increased protein intake across the diet. Expanding its range, Nutricia now offers fortisip in pudding formulations (Forticreme), Fortisip Yogurt Style & Fortijuice; with major differences to nutritional content contained in the different styles.

The high sugar content can cause accelerated tooth decay in frail elderly patients. These patients should have preventive dentistry in conjunction with Fortisip.

== See also ==
- Therapeutic food
- Dietary supplement
- Nutrition disorder
