= Arianna Burgos =

Ecuadorian politician

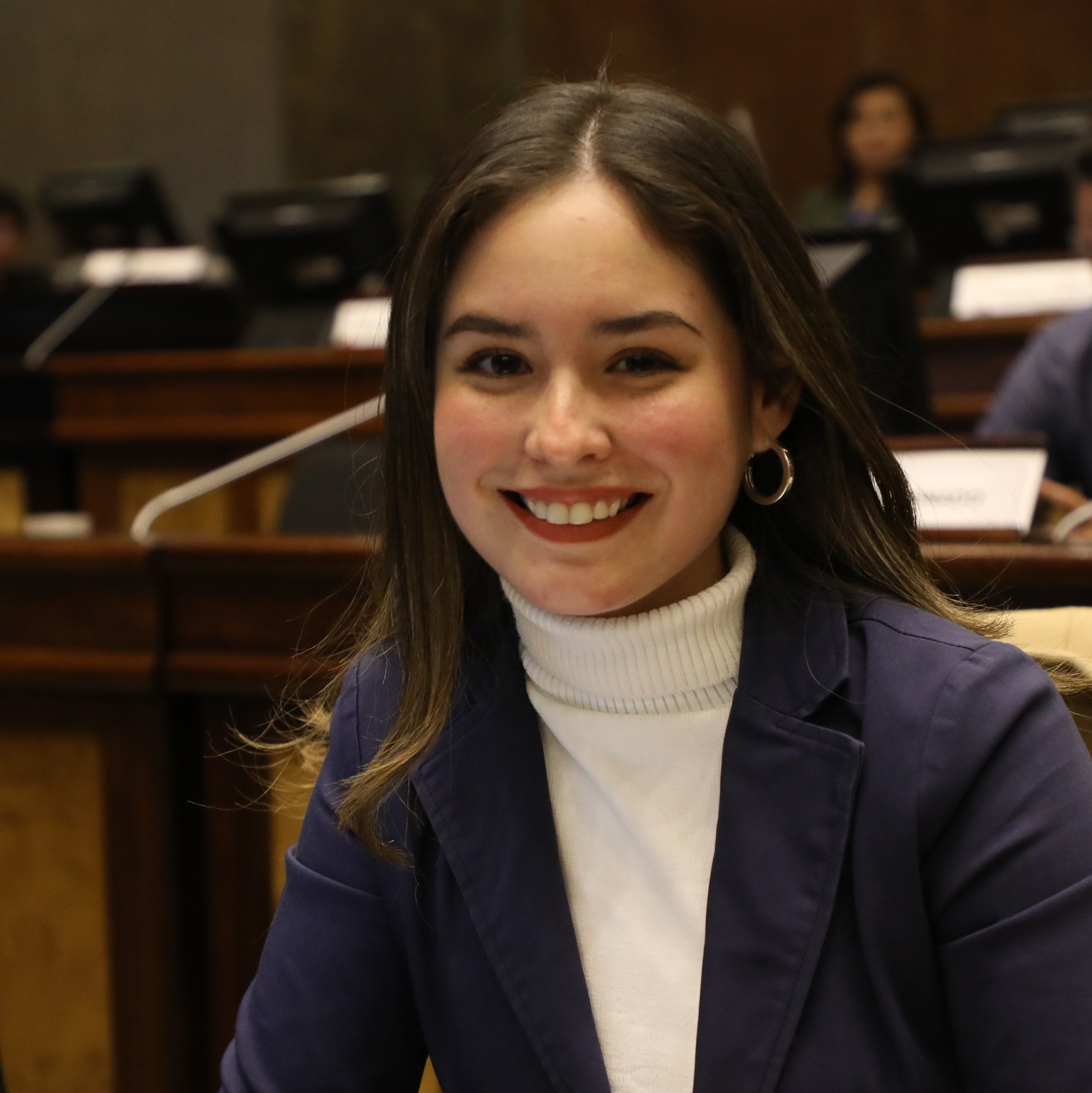
- at the National Assembly in 2022
- Other name: Arianna Stephany Burgos Carrera
- Occupations: lawyer and politician
- Known for: member of the National Assembly
- Political party: CREO 21

Arianna Stephany Burgos Carrera is an Ecuadorian lawyer and politician and member of Ecuador's National Assembly.

== Life ==
Burgos Carrera became a lawyer and she served on the Samborondón Chamber of Commerce and she was their vice President for 2019-2020. She is involved with training entrepreneurs as part of the "Emprendindo Juntas" project. She was the director of that project which is part of the Emprende Más Organization.

She stood as a candidate to become a member of Ecuador's National Assembly as a member of the Creo 21 party in October 2020. She stood in the Guayas Province.

She was second on the list of candidates that was led by Guido Chiriboga. There were 20 places for representatives for Guatas that were settled in the February 2021 elections. They were both elected.

Burgos became the Vice Minister of Economic Inclusion. In this capacity she toured the community of Cruz Loma where measures have been taken against child malnutrition including Child Development Centers where fresh crops were being grown.
