= Child poverty in Senegal =

Child poverty in Senegal is widespread, particularly in rural areas. As of 2024, UNICEF estimates that 4 in 10 Senegalese children live in poverty. 66% of children in rural areas live in poverty, while in urban areas this number reduces to 28.1%. In 2023, 37.5% of the population in Senegal lived below the poverty line.

Children that experience poverty are those who live below the poverty line, meaning they cannot get basic needs such as water, shelter, education, nutrition, or healthcare they need to survive. UNICEF estimates that about 900 million children experience multidimensional poverty, meaning they lack at lease one necessity needed for survival such as food, water, healthcare, shelter or education. The highest rates of multidimensional poverty are found in Sub-Saharan Africa.

UNICEF, which works with local partners in Senegal, found that about 10% of children in Senegal under the age of 5 suffer from malnutrition. Around 15% of the population lacks access to safe drinking water. Approximately 63% of children completed primary school in 2022, however about 90% of adolescents are not in school.

== Food insecurity ==
The Food and Agriculture Organization (FAO) defines food security as being when people, at all times, have economic and physical access to safe and nutritious food. There are four dimensions to food security: physical availability of food, economic and physical access to food, food utilization, and stability of the previous three over time. Therefore, food vulnerability refers to households experiencing food insecurity due to income loss, price volatility, or health crisis.

Due to Senegal's reliance on agriculture as its primary economic sector and food source, the country is vulnerable to the severe shocks of climate change. Agriculture accounts for 16% of Senegal's GDP. Senegal lies within the Sahel region, which has many changing weather patterns and irregular rainfall, making agricultural yields highly unpredictable. According to the Brookings Institution, Senegal has the "highest volatility of food production" in the region. Dependence on rain-fed agriculture leads to erratic production and food supply, as well as low water availability.

Senegal has a high prevalence of child malnutrition. Some of the largest factors contributing to food insecurity are lack of access to food, and poor quality of food when there is access. A SMART 2015 survey found that 13.9% of children in Senegal are underweight. The World Bank estimates that 93% of young children in Senegal do not receive an adequate diet. Low dietary diversification still remains a challenge in Senegal, also a leading factor of child malnutrition. Southern and Eastern regions of Senegal are the most impacted by food insecurity. Despite these regions having more economic potential and natural resources, these regions have high percentages of households whose food consumption is considered poor.

Covid-19 also created an increased risk of malnutrition in Senegal. The pandemic affected Senegal's health care systems and nutrition services. The spread of Covid-19 reduced availability and access to food, which lead to rising malnutrition rates. UNICEF approximates that 18,000 children were experiencing wasting, a form of malnutrition with an increased risk of mortality. Senegal received aid from a China-UNICEF cooperation against Covid-19, which helped mitigate the crisis on children and families in vulnerable positions. Nearly 87% of households in Senegal also reported income declines due to Covid-19, especially in rural areas. Evidence from a Discoveries in Agriculture and Food Sciences article found that Covid-19 strained household access to goods and services in Senegal. Families experienced a loss of purchasing power, therefore limiting the ability for families to acquire food and health products.

== Rural versus urban poverty ==
Children living in rural versus urban areas experience different levels of poverty. Rural areas of Senegal contain just over half of the population, however 80% of that population are poor or in vulnerable households. The World Bank estimates, as of 2024, that this impact is severe on children, as living in poverty affects nutrition, health, and education. Cambridge University's study found that stunting growth is more prevalent in rural areas compared to urban areas. Stunting growth is characterized as when a child is lower in height compared to those his age, and it is commonly related to malnutrition, and is found to be caused by food deprivation and illness. Wealth tends to be more concentrated in urban areas, and as a result, diets in urban areas are larger in portion. In 2015, 10% of children living in urban areas were underweight, while in rural areas, 18% of children are underweight. The Brookings Institution also found that rural households tend to spend more than half of their income on food, therefore they are vulnerable to disruptions in food production and price shocks.

Education also varies between rural and urban areas. Children in rural areas face more obstacles to access education. Rural areas have an insufficient amount of schools, leading to families having to invest money into transportations systems, many of which cannot afford to do so. The distance from the school also affects attendance. A lack of efficient transport to these schools puts those in low income situations at a disadvantage. The few amount of schools also leads to overcrowding, which negatively affects the quality of education. Institutions face high economic constraints which affect school activity. Even children living among the poorest populations in urban regions are more likely to have attended school than those in rural areas. Girls are still less likely to attend school in both urban and rural areas, however in urban areas there is a higher percentage of their attendance. Education and poverty are intertwined. Learning poverty threatens children's future, and leads to their lack of necessary skills needed to thrive and contribute to their communities. The development of the state is also affected when the younger generations do not develop their abilities. Children who face poverty more often than not focus on getting basic necessities, such as food and water, instead of education. Lack of education fosters inequality that is already prevalent, keeping people in the same socio-economic situations.

== Programs and policies to combat poverty ==
Senegal has implemented many policies and national programs in attempts to combat poverty. Senegal's increased commitment across government levels has facilitated access to funding to combat malnutrition. Since 2000, Senegal has implemented 14 nutrition-related policies related to agriculture, health, education, and finance. The Community Nutrition Program ran from 1994 to 2000 which was established to address undernutrition and unemployment. The Nutrition Enhancement Program began in 2001. The objective was to improve the nutritional status of children under the age of 5, and worked across multiple sectors and levels of government. The fight against malnutrition (CLM) was also established in 2001 as a coordinating body for nutrition within the prime ministers office. CLM has brought together sectors of the government, such as health, education, and agriculture, to include nutrition in their agendas. Institutional coherence has been strengthened to combat nutrition problems. From 2015 to 2025, the government established its National Policy for Nutrition Development, which has a renewed focus on structural determinants of nutrition, and outlined four pillars to increase nutrition: food production, food processing, education and hygiene, and health and nutrition services.

=== Programme National de Bourses de Sécurité Familiale (PNBSF) ===
The Programme National de Bourses de Sécurité Familiale (PNBSF) began in 2013. It is a national cash transfer program (family security grants) that benefits families in low-income households by promoting investments in human capital. The program is a conditional cash transfer, meaning applicants have to meet certain criteria in order to qualify. The PNBSF offers families quarterly cash deposits of 25,000 CFA. One necessary criterion is that families need to send their children to school. This criterion ensures that children who face financial difficulties at home still have access to education. The PNBSF also has healthcare initiatives to improve the healthcare disparities in Senegal. These initiatives expand healthcare coverage by guaranteeing free enrollment. These initiatives provide healthcare subsidies for households that qualify for the cash transfers. Community-based healthcare insurance is also an initiative through the PNBSF with the objective of expanding healthcare coverage to rural communities.

=== Effects of the PNBSF ===
Since its inauguration in 2013, many studies have been conducted to find whether the PNBSF has actually improved the quality of life for those who qualify for it. Due to the multiple components of the program, such as healthcare initiatives and cash transfers, studies focus on the various aspects to see whether each prong is beneficial or not. ScientificAfrican's study found that cash transfers increase the number of meals per day that families in low-income households receive. The program boosts the households wellbeing and economic resilience. The World Bank conducted a study to assess the overall impacts of the PNBSF, and analyze whether there were positive effects of the plan. From 2016-2019, the World Bank found that two-thirds of the money transferred into the accounts of household beneficiaries was used for food. The World Bank also found that the program has not necessarily lifted up families out of poverty, but it has changed many families status from "extreme poverty" to "poverty". A study done by BMJ Global Health found that enrollment in community-based health insurance is still extremely low, even in rural areas. The study also found that knowledge about the community-based health insurance program is very minimal among those who receive cash transfers through the PNBSF, indicating that there must be more initiative to get these people into these health programs.
