= Refeeding syndrome =

Illness caused by the sudden feeding of a malnourished individual

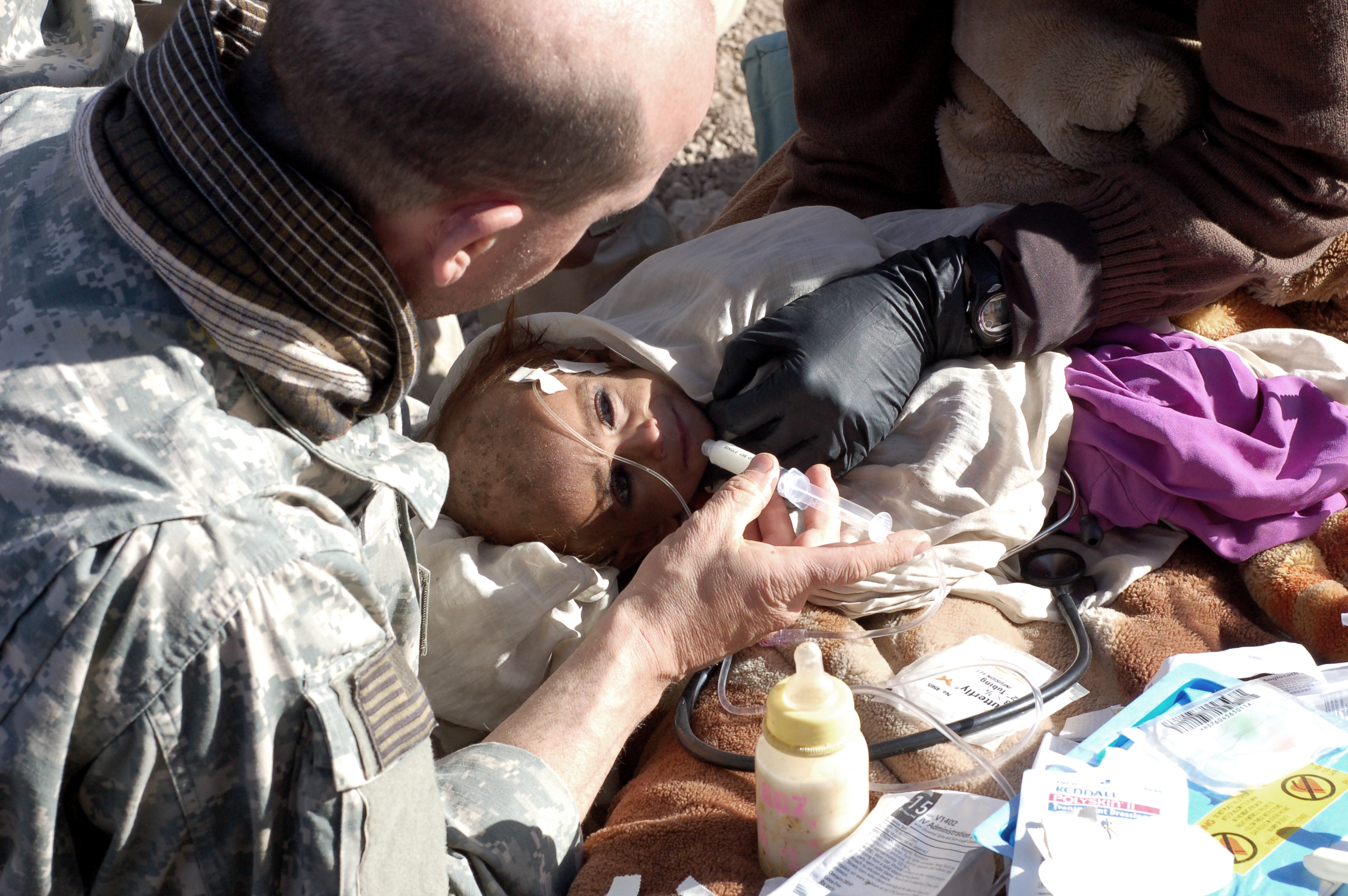
- A malnourished Afghan child being treated by a medical team
- Specialty: Gastroenterology
- Complications: electrolyte imbalance, heart failure, cardiac arrhythmia, respiratory failure, seizure, coma
- Risk factors: Starvation; Dehydration; Malnutrition; Very low weight; Unintentional weight loss; Low levels of potassium, phosphate, or magnesium before eating; Alcoholism; Prolonged fasting; Torture; Metabolic syndrome; Anorexia nervosa; Avoidant/restrictive food intake disorder; Some types of medications

Refeeding syndrome (RFS) is a metabolic disturbance which occurs as a result of reinstitution of nutrition in people who are starved, severely malnourished, or metabolically stressed because of severe illness. When too much food or liquid nutrition supplement is consumed during the initial four to seven days following a malnutrition event, the production of glycogen, fat and protein in cells may cause low serum concentrations of potassium, magnesium and phosphate. The electrolyte imbalance may cause neurologic, pulmonary, cardiac, neuromuscular, and hematologic symptoms—many of which, if severe enough, may result in death.

== Cause ==
Any individual who has had a negligible nutrient intake for many consecutive days and/or is metabolically stressed from a critical illness or major surgery is at risk of refeeding syndrome. Refeeding syndrome usually occurs within four days of starting to re-feed. Patients can develop fluid and electrolyte imbalance, especially hypophosphatemia, along with neurologic, pulmonary, cardiac, neuromuscular, and hematologic complications.

During fasting, the body switches its main fuel source from carbohydrates to initially fatty acids from fat tissue during ketosis and later amino acids from protein sources such as muscle as its main energy sources. The body begins to selectively consume muscle as a protein source via autophagy after prolonged fasting, and starvation ensues when all fat reserves have been depleted and protein becomes the only fuel source. However, it is possible for death to occur before the fat reserves have been entirely depleted due to the weakening of the internal organs from the autophagia. The spleen also decreases its rate of red blood cell breakdown, thus conserving red blood cells. Many intracellular minerals become severely depleted during this period, although serum levels remain normal. Importantly, insulin secretion is suppressed in this fasting state, and glucagon secretion is increased.

During refeeding, insulin secretion resumes in response to increased blood sugar, resulting in increased glycogen, fat, and protein synthesis. Therefore, the basal metabolic rate increases. This process requires phosphates, magnesium and potassium which are already depleted, with any remaining available rapidly used up. Formation of phosphorylated carbohydrate compounds in the liver and skeletal muscle depletes intracellular ATP and 2,3-diphosphoglycerate in red blood cells, leading to cellular dysfunction and inadequate oxygen delivery to the body's organs. Intracellular movement of electrolytes occurs along with a fall in the serum electrolytes, including phosphate and magnesium. Levels of serum glucose may rise, and B_{1} vitamin (thiamine) may fall. Abnormal heart rhythms are the most common cause of death from refeeding syndrome, with other significant risks including confusion, coma, convulsions, and cardiac failure.

=== Anorectics ===
An anorectic is a drug which reduces appetite, resulting in lower food consumption, leading to weight loss.

Examples of anorectics includes stimulants like amphetamines, methylphenidate, and cocaine, along with opiates. Abusing them can lead to prolonged periods of inadequate calorie intake. If someone misuses these substances and then starts eating normally again, they may be at increased risk of refeeding syndrome.

== Clinical situations ==
The syndrome can occur at the beginning of treatment for eating disorders, when patients have an increase in calorie intake, and can be fatal. It can also occur when someone does not eat for several days at a time, usually beginning after 4–5 days with no food. It can also occur after the onset of a severe illness or major surgery. The shifting of electrolytes and fluid balance increases cardiac workload and heart rate. This can lead to acute heart failure. Oxygen consumption is increased, which strains the respiratory system and can make weaning from ventilation more difficult.

== Signs and symptoms ==
The signs and symptoms of refeeding syndrome can vary based on the severity of electrolyte disturbances, including weakness, arrhythmias, and respiratory difficulty. Hypophosphatemia, a key feature of refeeding syndrome, may lead to muscle weakness, heart failure, and impaired diaphragmatic function, while hypokalemia and hypomagnesemia can result in cardiac arrhythmias, seizures, and other severe complications.

== Diagnosis ==
Refeeding syndrome can be fatal if not recognized and treated properly. The electrolyte disturbances of the refeeding syndrome can occur within the first few days of refeeding. Close monitoring of blood biochemistry is therefore necessary in the early refeeding period.

The National Institute for Health and Clinical Excellence identifies the following criteria for individuals at high risk for refeeding syndrome:

Either the patient has one or more of the following:

- Body mass index <16 kg/m^{2}
- Unintentional weight loss >15% in the past three to six months
- Little or no nutritional intake for >10 days
- Low levels of potassium, phosphate, or magnesium before feeding

Or the patient has two or more of the following:

- Body mass index <18.5 kg/m^{2}
- Unintentional weight loss >10% in the past three to six months
- Little or no nutritional intake for >5 days
- History of alcohol misuse or drugs, including insulin, chemotherapy, antacids, or diuretics

== Treatment ==
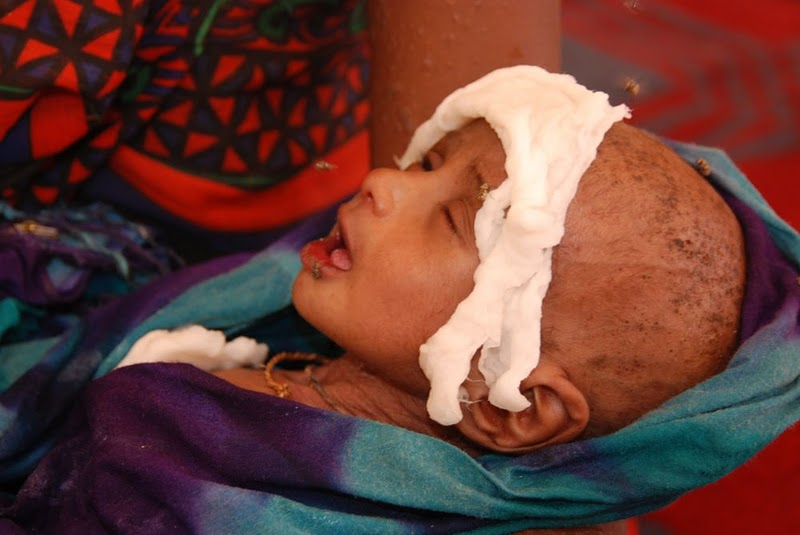
A Somali boy receiving treatment for malnourishment at a health facility

In critically ill patients admitted to an intensive care unit, if phosphate drops to below 0.65 mmol/L (2.0 mg/dL) from a previously normal level within three days of starting enteral or parenteral nutrition, caloric intake should be reduced to 480 kcals per day for at least two days while electrolytes are replaced. Daily doses of NADH/CoQ_{10}/thiamine, Vitamin B complex and a multivitamin and mineral preparation are strongly recommended. Blood biochemistry should be monitored regularly until it is stable. Although clinical trials are lacking in patients other than those admitted to intensive care, it is commonly recommended that energy intake should remain lower than that normally required for the first 3–5 days of treatment of refeeding syndrome for all patients.

== History ==
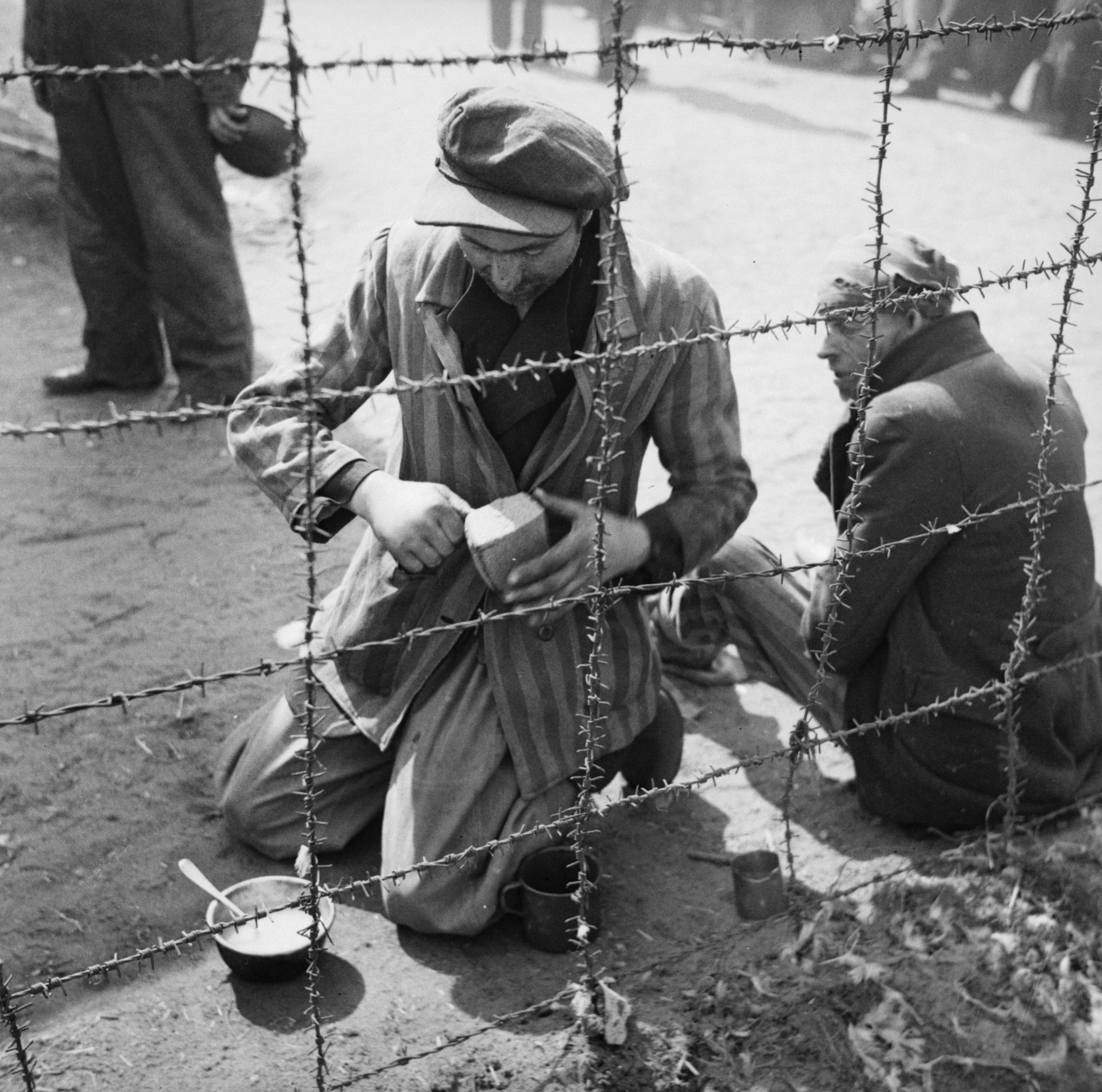
Two prisoners at Bergen-Belsen concentration camp receiving their first meal after liberation

In his 5th century BC work "On Fleshes" (De Carnibus), Hippocrates writes, "if a person goes seven days without eating or drinking anything, in this period most die; but there are some who survive that time but still die, and others are persuaded not to starve themselves to death but to eat and drink: however, the cavity no longer admits anything because the jejunum (nêstis) has grown together in that many days, and these people too die." Although Hippocrates misidentifies the cause of death, this passage likely represents an early description of refeeding syndrome. The Roman historian Flavius Josephus writing in the 1st century AD described classic symptoms of the syndrome among survivors of the siege of Jerusalem. He described the death of those who overindulged in food after the famine, whereas those who ate at a more restrained pace survived. The Shinchō Kōki also describes a similar outcome when starved soldiers were fed after the surrender at the siege of Tottori castle on 25 October 1581.

It is difficult to ascertain when the syndrome was first discovered and named in the literature, but it is likely the associated electrolyte disturbances were identified perhaps in Holland, the Netherlands during the so-called Hunger Winter, spanning the closing months of World War II.

There were numerous cases of refeeding syndrome in the Siege of Leningrad during World War II, with Soviet civilians trapped in the city having become malnourished due to the German blockade.

A common error, repeated in multiple papers, is that "The syndrome was first described after World War II in Americans who, held by the Japanese as prisoners of war, had become malnourished during captivity and who were then released to the care of United States personnel in the Philippines." However, closer inspection of the 1951 paper by Schnitker reveals the prisoners under study were not American POWs but Japanese soldiers who, already malnourished, surrendered in the Philippines during 1945, after the war was over.

Refeeding syndrome has also been documented among survivors of the Ebensee concentration camp upon their liberation by the United States Army in May 1945. After liberation, the inmates were fed rich soup. A few died, presumably because their stomachs could not handle the sudden caloric intake and digestion.

== See also ==
- Minnesota Starvation Experiment
- F-100 and F-75
- RUTF / Ready to Use Therapeutic Food / Therapeutic food: Modern solution to feeding people after a famine while preventing RFS

== Bibliography ==
- Shils, M.E., Shike, M., Ross, A.C., Caballero, B. & Cousins, R.J. (2006). Modern nutrition in health and disease, 10th ed. Lippincott, Williams & Wilkins. Baltimore, Maryland.
- Mahan, L.K. & Escott-Stump, S.E. (2004) Krause's Food, Nutrition, & Diet Therapy, 11th ed. Saunders, Philadelphia, Pennsylvania.
- Hearing S (2004). "Refeeding syndrome: Is underdiagnosed and undertreated, but treatable". BMJ. 328 (7445): 908–9. doi:10.1136/bmj.328.7445.908. PMC 390152. PMID 15087326.
- Crook M, Hally V, Panteli J (2001). "The importance of the refeeding syndrome". Nutrition. 17 (7–8): 632–7. doi:10.1016/S0899-9007(01)00542-1. PMID 11448586.
- Lauts N (2005). "Management of the patient with refeeding syndrome". J Infus Nurs. 28 (5): 337–42. doi:10.1097/00129804-200509000-00007. PMID 16205500. S2CID 39877542.
- Kraft M, Btaiche I, Sacks G (2005). "Review of the refeeding syndrome" (PDF). Nutr Clin Pract. 20 (6): 625–33. doi:10.1177/0115426505020006625. hdl:2027.42/142310. PMID 16306300.
- "Evidence — Nutrition support for adults: oral nutrition support, enteral tube feeding and parenteral nutrition — Guidance". National Institute for Health and Care Excellence (NICE). 22 February 2006 [Updated 4 August 2017]. Web page with link to full guideline CG32.
- Mehanna, H. M., Moledina, J., & Travis, J. (2008). Refeeding syndrome: what it is, and how to prevent and treat it. BMJ (Clinical research ed.), 336(7659), 1495–1498. https://doi.org/10.1136/bmj.a301
