= Marasmus =

Severe malnutrition due to energy deficiency

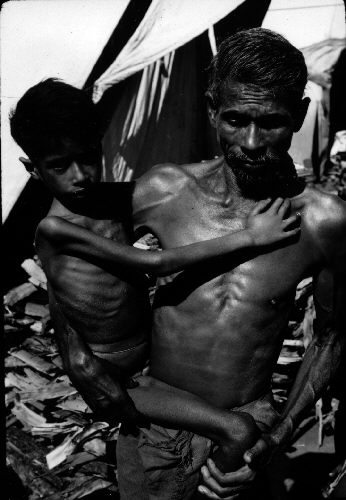
- Photo from 1972 of an emaciated child in India with marasmus
- Specialty: Critical care medicine
- Causes: Starvation, malnutrition, cachexia

Marasmus is a form of severe malnutrition characterized by energy deficiency. It can be distinguished from kwashiorkor in that kwashiorkor is protein deficiency with adequate energy intake whereas marasmus has inadequate energy intake in all forms, including protein. It can occur in anyone with severe malnutrition but usually occurs in children. Body weight is reduced to less than 62% of the normal (expected) body weight for the age. Marasmus occurrence increases before age 1, whereas kwashiorkor occurrence increases after 18 months. This clear-cut separation of marasmus and kwashiorkor is however not always clinically evident as kwashiorkor is often seen in a context of insufficient caloric intake, and mixed clinical pictures, called marasmic kwashiorkor, are possible. Protein wasting in kwashiorkor generally leads to edema and ascites, while muscular wasting and loss of subcutaneous fat are the main clinical signs of marasmus, which makes the ribs and joints protrude.

The prognosis is better than it is for kwashiorkor. Marasmus is the form of malnutrition most highly associated with HIV, developing in the last stages of pediatric AIDS, and the prognosis for children with co-morbid marasmus and HIV is very poor.

The word "marasmus" comes from the Greek μαρασμός marasmos ("withering").

== Signs and symptoms ==
Marasmus is commonly characterized by a shrunken, wasted appearance, loss of muscle mass, and subcutaneous fat mass in adult survivors, due to a deficiency in macronutrients and caloric intake (specifically protein) that affect development. Other long term effects of marasmus are the increased risks for pancreatic beta-cell dysfunction which leads to glucose intolerance and type 2 diabetes. This may lead to reduced muscle mass, and increased visceral fat. Moreover, there are metabolic implications including reduced insulin sensitivity and impaired glucose metabolism. There is also an increased risk of other NCDs (non-communicable diseases) as well as CVRFs (cardiovascular risk factors). Not only are the survivors of marasmus impacted, but their offspring as well. There is an association with survivors and their offspring having a low birth weight. There are also long term effects related to gene methylation. Marasmus adult survivors may have changes in gene expression regarding immunity, growth, and glucose metabolism.

== Diagnosis ==
The first steps in the diagnosis of marasmus are through physical examination and anthropometric calculations. Some of the features that are diagnosable in a physical exam are severe wasting and stunting, appearing abnormally thin. Wasting is calculated by measuring weight for height. If the child is 2 standard deviations from the WHO standard, they are considered wasted. Stunting is calculated the same way, however, it is based on height for age ratios. Measurements are also taken via the middle-upper arm circumference (MUAC). After physical examination and measurements, blood tests can be done to determine protein deficiency as well as deficiencies in other major minerals and vitamins. This helps determine the nutritional status and if there are any indicators of marasmus. In extreme cases of infection, stool samples and blood counts are conducted. Since marasmus is a type of nutritional condition that is often associated with kwashiorkor, some providers will see if edema is present to confirm that it is marasmus. Presence of edema is associated with kwashiorkor, not marasmus.

== Causes ==
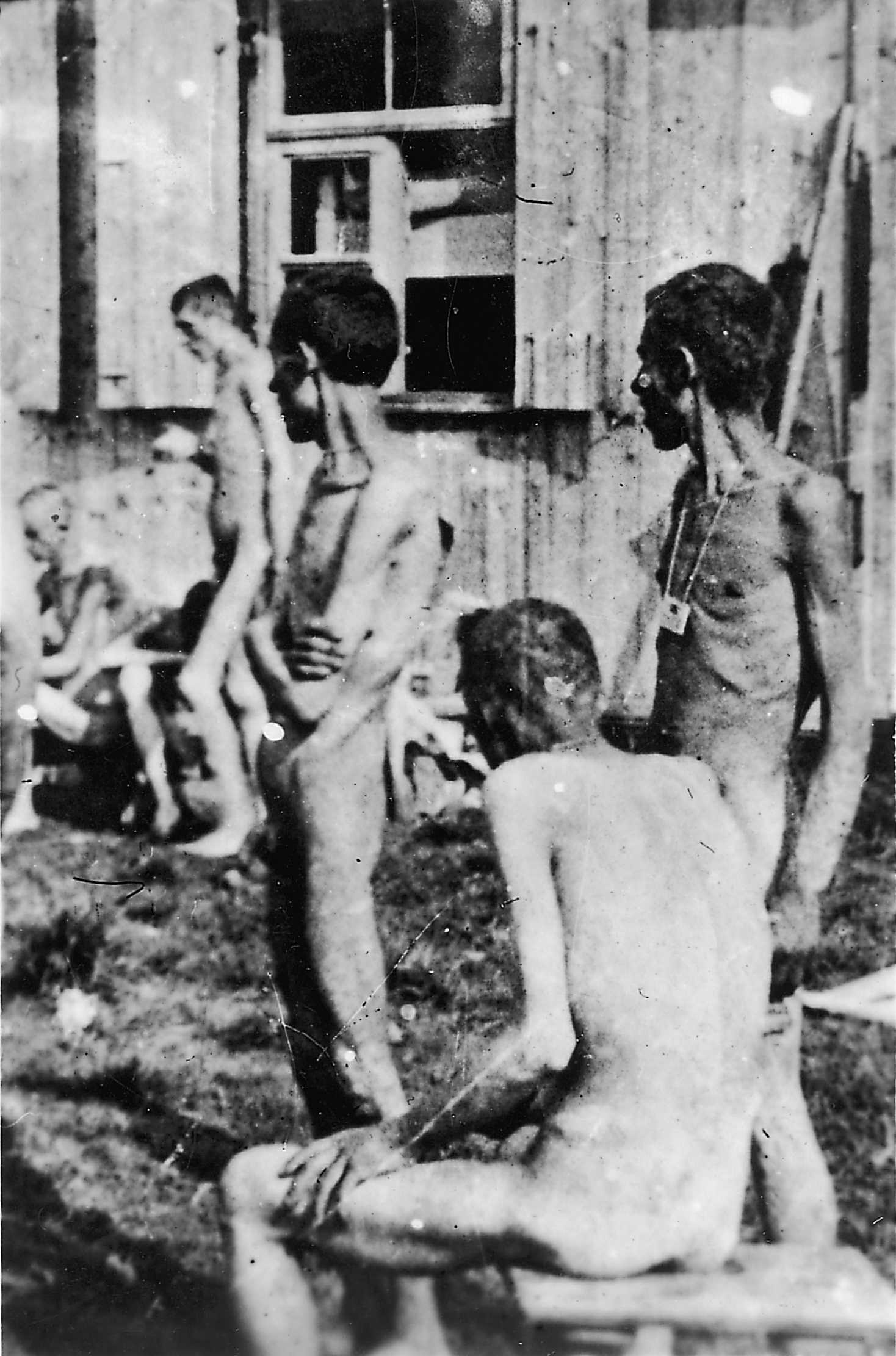
Buchenwald concentration camp inmates on 16 April 1945, when the camp was liberated by the US Army

Marasmus is caused by the following factors:

- Maternal malnutrition
- Maternal anemia
- Poverty
- Pathological conditions in a baby (e.g., diarrhea)
- Pneumonia
- Cyanotic heart diseases
- Malaria
- Necrotizing enterocolitis
- Pyloric stenosis
- Lactose intolerance
- Intussusception
- Meningitis
- Anorexia nervosa

== Treatment ==
Both the causes and complications of the disorder must be treated, including infections, dehydration, and circulation disorders, which are frequently lethal and lead to high mortality if ignored. Initially, the child is fed dried skim milk that has been mixed with boiled water. Refeeding must be done slowly to avoid refeeding syndrome. Once children start to recover, they should have more balanced diets that meet their nutritional needs. Children with marasmus commonly develop infections and are consequently treated with antibiotics or other medications. Ultimately, marasmus can progress to the point of no return when the body's ability for protein synthesis is lost. At this point, attempts to correct the disorder by giving food or protein become futile, and death is inevitable.

== Prevention ==
Nutritionally the best way to prevent marasmus is through a diverse and adequate diet. Other interventions that also target nutrition-specific interventions are SAM treatment, CTC (comprehensive treatment center), and protein and micronutrient supplements. It is also important for mothers and families to be educated on prenatal care, nutrition, and child development. Energy, protein, and micronutrient supplementation are vital to ensuring the mother and child are adequately nourished. Strictly breastfeeding for 6 months and 24 months for nutritional supplementation is also recommended to prevent marasmus and other malnutrition of children under the age of 2.

In addition to nutrition, ensuring access to clean water, sanitation, and hygiene are important in preventing childhood illness and diarrheal disease which can contribute to marasmus and other severe acute malnutrition cases. If the child has marasmus, it can quickly become dangerous if the child has another disease since the immune system's functioning decreases when a child has marasmus. It is important for the child or anyone at risk for marasmus to have access to primary care so they can treat these illnesses, prevent diarrheal diseases often associated with malnutrition and monitor growth.

== Epidemiology ==
=== United States ===
In the United States, marasmus is rarely seen, especially in children. In 1995, there were only 228 deaths caused by marasmus in the U.S., of which only 3 were children. In 2016, the prevalence of marasmus in the United States was 0.5%. Prevalence is higher in hospitalized children, especially ones with chronic illnesses, however, the exact incidence of nonfatal marasmus is not known. This is due to marasmus not being reported as an admission or discharge diagnosis.

=== Outside the US ===
There are multiple forms of malnutrition and roughly one-third of the world's population is currently experiencing one or more of them. There are around 50 million children less than five years old who have protein-energy malnutrition. Of the malnourished children population in the world, 80% live in Asia, 15% in Africa, and 5% in Latin America. It is estimated that the prevalence of acute malnutrition in Germany, France, the United Kingdom, and the United States is 6.1–14%. In Turkey, the prevalence is as high as 32%.

=== Race ===
There is no evident racial predisposition that correlates to malnutrition. Rather, there is a strong association with the geographic distribution of poverty.

=== Age ===
Marasmus is more commonly seen in children under the age of five due to that age range being characterized as one that has an increase in energy need and susceptibility to viral and bacterial infections. The World Health Organization also identifies the elderly as another population that is vulnerable to malnutrition. Because their nutritional requirement is not well defined, attempts to provide them with the necessary nutrition becomes difficult.

There exist screening tools and tests that can be used to help identify signs and symptoms of malnutrition in older adults. The Malnutrition Screening Tool (MST) is a validated malnutrition screening tool that is primarily used in the residential aged care facility or for adults in the inpatient/outpatient hospital setting. It includes parameters such as weight loss and appetite.

Disability-adjusted life year for protein-energy malnutrition per 100,000 inhabitants in 2002 no data less than 10 10–100 100–200 200–300 300–400 400–500 500–600 600–700 700–800 800–1000 1000–1350 more than 1350

Persons in prisons, concentration camps, and refugee camps are affected more often due to poor nutrition.

== Socioeconomic implications ==
Those who are in poverty are more likely to develop marasmus and other nutritional deficiencies. Due to childhood malnutrition, survivors of marasmus often have poorer socioeconomic prospects due to cognitive compromise in their developmental years. Since adequate nutrition is vital for development, those with marasmus are impacted by impaired neurodevelopment. This results in a loss of education in the early school years, leading to limited higher educational and occupational opportunities. Prevention may look like improving nutritional education and access, as well as eliminating poverty are ways to reduce the risks of developing these deficiencies.

== See also ==
- Starvation
- Cachexia
- Emaciation
- Kwashiorkor
- Protein poisoning
