= Protein–energy malnutrition =

Protein–energy undernutrition
- Other names: Protein–calorie undernutrition, PEU, PCU, PEM, PCM
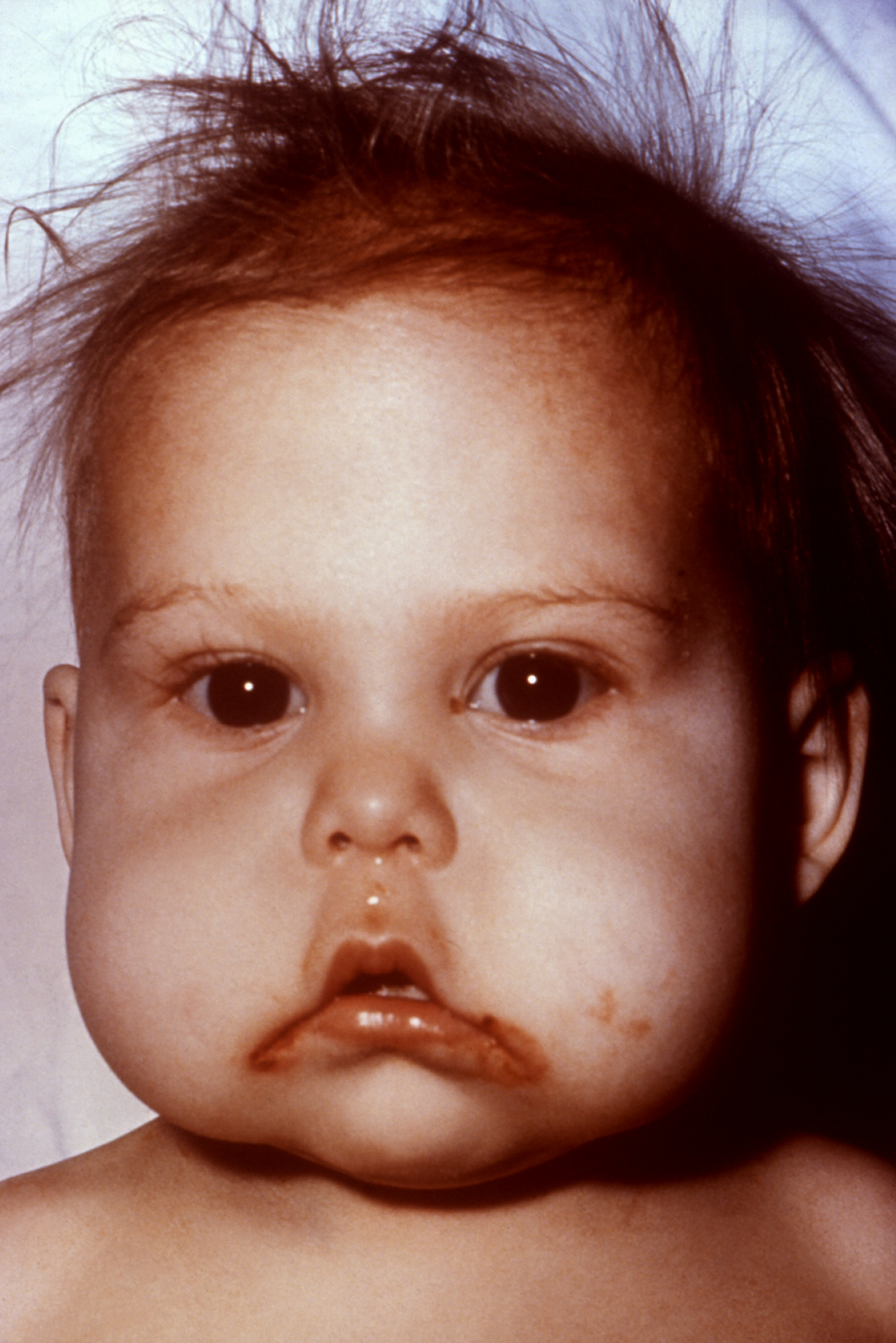
- Child in the United States in 1970 with signs of kwashiorkor, an example of protein-energy undernutrition.
- Specialty: Endocrinology

Protein–energy undernutrition (PEU), once called protein–energy malnutrition (PEM), is a form of malnutrition that is defined as a range of conditions arising from coincident lack of dietary protein and/or energy (calories) in varying proportions. The condition has mild, moderate, and severe degrees.

Types include:

- Kwashiorkor (protein malnutrition predominant)
- Marasmus (deficiency in calorie intake)
- Marasmic kwashiorkor (marked protein deficiency and marked calorie insufficiency signs present, sometimes referred to as the most severe form of malnutrition)

PEU is fairly common worldwide in both children and adults and accounts for about 250,000 deaths annually. In the industrialized world, PEM is predominantly seen in hospitals, is associated with disease, or is often found in the elderly.

Note that PEU may be secondary to other conditions such as chronic renal disease or cancer cachexia in which protein energy wasting (PEW) may occur.

Protein–energy undernutrition affects children the most because they have less protein intake. The few rare cases found in the developed world are almost entirely found in small children as a result of fad diets, or ignorance of the nutritional needs of children, particularly in cases of milk allergy.

== Prenatal ==
Protein undernutrition is detrimental at any point in life, but protein undernutrition prenatally has been shown to have significant lifelong effects. Diets that consist of less than 6% protein in utero have been linked with many deficits, including decreased brain weight, increased obesity, and impaired communication within the brain in some animals. Even diets of mild protein undernutrition (7.2%) have been shown to have lasting and significant effects in rats. The following are some studies in which prenatal protein deficiency has been shown to have unfavorable consequences.

- Decreased brain size: Protein deficiency has been shown to affect the size and composition of brains in rhesus monkeys. Monkeys whose mother had eaten a diet with an adequate amount of protein were shown to have no deficit in brain size or composition, even when their body weight amounted to less than one-half of that of the controls, whereas monkeys whose mothers had eaten low-protein diets were shown to have smaller brains regardless of the diet given after birth.
- Impaired neocortical long-term potentiation: Mild protein deficiency (in which 7.2% of the diet consists of protein) in rats has been shown to impair entorhinal cortex plasticity (visuospatial memory), noradrenergic function in the neocortex, and neocortical long-term potentiation.
- Altered fat distribution: Protein undernutrition can have varying effects depending on the period of fetal life during which the malnutrition occurred. Although there were not significant differences in the food intake, there were increased amounts of perirenal fat in rats that were protein-deprived during early (gestation days 0–7) and mid (gestation days 8–14) pregnancy, and throughout pregnancy, whereas rats that were protein-deprived only late in gestation (gestation days 15–22) were shown to have increased gonadal fat.
- Increased obesity: Mice exposed to a low-protein diet prenatally weighed 40% less than the control group at birth (intrauterine growth retardation). When fed a high-fat diet after birth, the prenatally undernourished mice were shown to have increased body weight and adiposity (body fat), while those who were adequately nourished prenatally did not show an increase in body weight or adiposity when fed the same high-fat diet after birth.
- Decreased birth weight, and gestation duration: Supplementation of protein and energy can lead to increased duration of gestation and higher birth weight. When fed a supplement containing protein, energy, and micronutrients, pregnant women showed more successful results during birth, including high birth weights, longer gestations, and fewer pre-term births, than women who had consumed a supplement with micronutrients and low energy but no protein (although this finding may be due to the increase of energy in the supplements, not the increase of protein).
- Increased stress sensitivity: Male offspring of pregnant rats fed low-protein diets have been shown to exhibit blood pressure that is hyperresponsive to stress and salt.
- Decreased sperm quality: A low-protein diet during gestation in rats has been shown to affect the sperm quality of the male offspring in adulthood. The protein deficiency appeared to reduce sertoli cell number, sperm motility, and sperm count.
- Altered cardiac energy metabolism: Prenatal nutrition, specifically protein nutrition, may affect the regulation of cardiac energy metabolism through changes in specific genes.
- Increased passive stiffness: Intrauterine undernutrition was shown to increase passive stiffness in skeletal muscles in rats.

From these studies it is possible to conclude that prenatal protein nutrition is vital to the development of the fetus, especially the brain, the susceptibility to diseases in adulthood, and even gene expression. When pregnant females of various species were given low-protein diets, the offspring were shown to have many deficits. These findings highlight the great significance of adequate protein in the prenatal diet.

== Epidemiology ==
Protein energy malnutrition mortality rates in children

Although protein energy malnutrition is more common in low-income countries, children from higher-income countries are also affected, including children from large urban areas in low socioeconomic neighborhoods. This may also occur in children with chronic diseases, and children who are institutionalized or hospitalized for a different diagnosis. Risk factors include a primary diagnosis of intellectual disability, cystic fibrosis, malignancy, cardiovascular disease, end stage renal disease, oncologic disease, genetic disease, neurological disease, multiple diagnoses, or prolonged hospitalization. In these conditions, the challenging nutritional management may get overlooked and underestimated, resulting in an impairment of the chances for recovery and the worsening of the situation.

PEM is fairly common worldwide in both children and adults and accounts for 250,000 deaths annually. In the industrialized world, PEM is predominantly seen in hospitals, is associated with disease, or is often found in the elderly.

== Co-morbidity ==
A large percentage of children with PEM also have other co-morbid conditions. The most common co-morbidities are diarrhea (72.2% of a sample of 66 subjects) and malaria (43.3%). However, a variety of other conditions have been observed with PEM, including sepsis, severe anaemia, bronchopneumonia, HIV, tuberculosis, scabies, chronic suppurative otitis media, rickets, and keratomalacia. These co-morbidities, according to Agozie Ubesie and other paediatricians, tax already malnourished children and may prolong hospital stays initially for PEM and may increase the likelihood of death.

The general explanation of increased infectious comorbidity in malnourished people is that (1) the immune system is what prevents such diseases from being more widespread in healthy, well-nourished people and (2) malnutrition stresses and diminishes immune function. In other words, malnutrition tends to cause (mild or moderate) immunodeficiency, eroding the barriers that normally keep infectious diseases at bay. For example, this reversal is well established regarding the variable natural history of tuberculosis in the pre–TB drug era. Epidemiologically, there are also associations between malnutrition and other health risks via the common underlying factor of poverty. For example, condoms can reduce spread of HIV, but impoverished people often may not have money to buy condoms or a nearby place to buy them. Also, once a poor person has any particular infection, they may not have access to optimal treatment of it, which allows it to get worse, present more chances of transmission, and so on. Even when a developing country nominally/officially has national health insurance with universal health care, the poorest quarter of its population may face a de facto reality of poor health care access.
