= K-Mix 2 =

Food used for treatment of malnutrition

K-Mix 2 is a high energy food used for the treatment of severe malnutrition. It was developed by UNICEF in response to the Biafran War, and was widely used in later famines in India and Africa.

It is a dry mix of

- 3 parts by weight calcium caseinate
- 5 parts dried skimmed milk
- 10 parts sugar

When made up, the 100 g K-Mix-2 is combined with 60 g of oil and 1 litre of water.

Although extremely effective in the treatment of children too weak to feed themselves, its high cost precludes it from being used in any but the most extreme cases. After the acute malnutrition has been treated, it is replaced with other foods.
