= Sumo Salad =

Australian salad bar

- Type: Subsidiary and franchise system
- Industry: Restaurant
- Founded: 2003; 23 years ago
- Headquarters: Sydney
- Number of locations: One
- Products: Salads

Sumo Salad is an Australian salad bar founded in 2003 on Liverpool Street, Sydney, by Luke Baylis and James Miller.

Initially, Baylis and Miller hired friends and family to develop the business, including a trainer and marketer. In its first decade, Sumo Salad grew through franchising to reach 100 stores and expanded internationally with nine stores in New Zealand, Singapore, the United Arab Emirates, and Brazil.

From 2013 to 2015, Sumo Salad partnered with Paleo diet advocate Pete Evans.

In October 2015, co-founder James Miller was found dead by his flatmate, Nasser Elkordi, in their Elizabeth Bay, Sydney home. His death was believed to be caused by an unintentional drug overdose.

On 18 July 2018, Sumo Salad went into administration. A key reason given for its move was “legacy debts”, thought to relate to crippling rents the chain was handling with Westfield shopping centres.

On 7 March 2022, Sumo Salad was again placed into voluntary administration. As of 2025, there is no public evidence that the chain has reopened a significant number of stores. However, a main office still exists in Sydney, and a Sumo Salad location is still open at Sydney Airport.

== See also ==
- List of restaurant chains in Australia
