= Agozie Ubesie =

Agozie Chukwunedum Ubesie
- Born: 4 September 1970 (age 55); Achi, Oji River, Enugu, Nigeria
- Education: University of Nigeria (MBBS); University of Nigeria Teaching Hospital (FMCPaed.); University of Liverpool (MPH)

Agozie Chukwunedum Ubesie is a professor of pediatrics in the department of Paediatrics, College of Medicine, University of Nigeria Teaching Hospital. He is the current Dean of the Department of Medicine and Surgery.

== Career ==
Ubesie is the coordinator of the Comprehensive Paediatric HIV and AIDS Management (COMPHAM) Research Group of the University of Nigeria, focused on understanding the peculiarities of paediatric HIV and AIDS in Africa. As a Paediatrics Consultant, he is affiliated to the Cincinnati Children's Hospital Medical Center and the Griggs Specialist Hospital, Lagos, and he is known for researches on micro-nutrient deficiencies.

Agozie is the secretary of the Faculty of Paediatrics, National Postgraduate Medical College of Nigeria. He is a Fellow of the West African College of Physicians, and he won the 2015 best academic staff award of the University of Nigeria.

On 28 September 2023, at the Moot Court Hall of the University of Nigeria Enugu Campus, Ubesie delivered the 191st Inaugural Lecture of the University of Nigeria entitled, The Burden of Childhood Malnutrition and the Bane of a Developing Economy: Breaking the Barriers to Ending a Cycle.
