= Therapeutic food =

Foods designed for specific therapeutic purposes

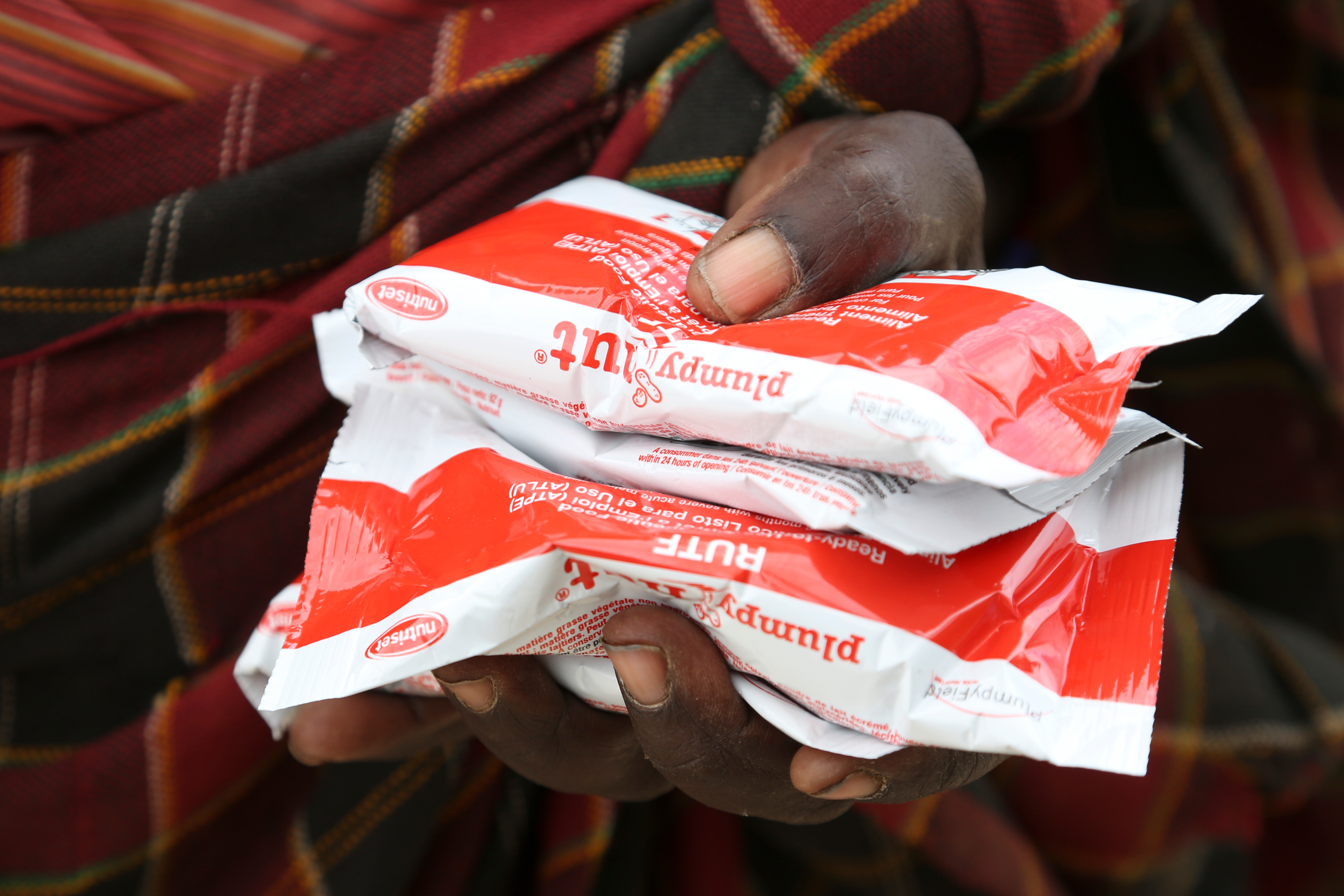
Packets of ready-to-use therapeutic food

Therapeutic foods are foods designed for specific, usually nutritional, therapeutic purposes as a form of dietary supplement. The primary examples of therapeutic foods are used for emergency feeding of undernourished children or to supplement the diets of persons with special nutrition requirements, such as the elderly.

The term theraputic food mostly refers to energy- and/or nutrition-dense foods for feeding of children by mouth. Other types of food used in a therapeutic setting, such as food for tube feeding, are more commonly described as medical food. Therapeutic food for emergency feeding of children also counts as medical food.

== Non-ready-to-use therapeutic food ==
The 1999 standard treatment of childhood malnutrition was administered in two phases. Phase one (stabilization) usually deals with children who are severely malnourished and very ill as a result. The therapy used in this phase is F-75, a milk-based liquid food containing modest amounts of energy and protein (75 kcal/100 mL and 0.9 g protein/100 mL) and the administration of parenteral antibiotics. When an improvement in the child's appetite and clinical condition is observed, the child is entered into phase two (rehabilitation) of the treatment. This phase uses F-100. F-100 is a "specially formulated, high-energy, high-protein (100 kcal/100 mL, 2.9 g protein/100 mL) milk-based liquid food". The child is in phase two until they are no longer wasted [weight-for-height z score (WHZ) 2]. Phase two starts while the child is at the hospital but is usually completed after the child goes home. The parent is then responsible for feeding the child a flour supplement made of cereal and legumes as a replacement for the milk-based foods used in phases one and two.

The World Health Organization's 1999 standards for the treatment of malnutrition in children specify the use of two formulas during initial treatment, F-75 and F-100. These formulas contain a mixture of powdered milk, sugar, and other ingredients designed to provide an easily absorbed mix of carbohydrates and essential micronutrients. They are generally provided as powdered mixes which are reconstituted with water. The WHO recommends the use of these formulas, with the gradual introduction of other foods, until the child approaches a normal weight.

F-75 and F-100 remain in use in the inpatient field in the 2023 WHO Guideline. The two-phase framework remains, with the change that RUTF may be used in lieu of F-100 in the rehabilitation phase.

== Ready-to-use therapeutic food ==
WHO/UNICEF recommendation for RUTF composition
Name	Amount (per 100 g or otherwise specified)
Moisture content	2.5% maximum
Energy	520-550 Kcal
Proteins	10 to 12% total energy
Lipids	45 to 60% total energy
Sodium	290 mg maximum
Potassium	1100 to 1400 mg
Calcium	300 to 600 mg
Phosphorus (excluding phytate)	300 to 600 mg
Magnesium	80 to 140 mg
Iron	10 to 14 mg
Zinc	11 to 14 mg
Copper	1.4 to 1.8 mg
Selenium	20 to 40 μg
Iodine	70 to 140 μg
Vitamin A	0.8 to 1.1 mg
Vitamin D	15 to 20 μg
Vitamin E	20 mg minimum
Vitamin K	15 to 30 μg
Vitamin B1	0.5 mg minimum
Vitamin B2	1.6 mg minimum
Vitamin C	50 mg minimum
Vitamin B6	0.6 mg minimum
Vitamin B12	1.6 μg minimum
Folic acid	200 μg minimum
Niacin	5 mg minimum
Pantothenic acid	3 mg minimum
Biotin	60 μg minimum
n-6 fatty acids	3% to 10% of total energy
n-3 fatty acids	0.3 to 2.5% of total energy

A subset of therapeutic foods, ready-to-use therapeutic foods (RUTFs), are energy-dense, micronutrient-enriched pastes that have a nutritional profile similar to the traditional F-100 milk-based diet used in inpatient therapeutic feeding programs and are often made of peanuts, oil, sugar and milk powder. The paste form allows feeding of children as young as 6 months.

In addition to pastes and spreads, the 2023 WHO Guideline includes compressed biscuits/bars like BP-100 in the definition of RUTF.

=== Composition ===
RUTFs are made of sources of macronutrients (protein, carbohydrate, lipid) combined with concentrated vitamins and minerals. They are usually produced by grinding all ingredients together and mixing them. The mixing process allows for the protein and carbohydrate components of the food to be embedded in the lipid matrix. The size of the particles in the mixture has to be less than 200 μm for the mixture to maintain its consistency. Using this method, the therapeutic food is produced and packaged without using water in order to eliminate the issue of spoilage. Some therapeutic foods require the addition of water before administering, while others can be consumed as-is. Therapeutic foods are designed and manufactured to ensure that they are ready to eat straight from the packaging. Those foods resist bacterial contamination and require no cooking.

RUTFs are a "homogeneous mixture of lipid-rich and water-soluble foods." The lipids used in formulating RUTFs are in a viscous liquid form. The other ingredients are in small particles and are mixed through the lipid. The other ingredients are protein, carbohydrate, vitamins and minerals. The mixture needs to be homogeneous for it to be effectively consumed. To do this, a specific mixing process is needed. The fat/lipid component of the RUTF is heated and stirred first. The heat should be maintained for the lipid to remain in the optimum form for mixing in the other ingredients. The powdered protein, carbohydrate, and vitamins and minerals are then slowly and gradually added to the lipid, while the lipid is being vigorously stirred. After all the ingredients are added and vigorous stirring is maintained, the mixture is then stirred with more speed and for several minutes. If the powdered ingredients have a particle size that is larger than 200 μm, the mixture starts to separate; the particle size needs to be maintained at less than 200 μm.

The most common RUTFs are made of four ingredients: sugar, dried skimmed milk, oil, and vitamin and mineral supplement (CMV). Other qualities that RUTFs should have included a texture that is soft or crushable and a taste that is acceptable and suitable for young children. RUTFs should be ready to eat without needing to be cooked. A very important characteristic is that the RUTFs have a long shelf-life and that they are micro-organism contamination resistant, without the need for expensive packaging. Since the ingredients need to be suspended in liquid, the liquid used in producing RUTFs needs to be fat/lipid. 50% of the protein forming RUTFs should come from dairy products.

=== Standardization and use ===
UNICEF specifications for RUTFs say that the vitamin and mineral premix must be sourced from one of the following vendors authorized by the World Food Programme: DSM Nutrition/Fortitech, Nicholas Piramal Healthcare Ltd (now Piramal Group), Hexagon Nutrition, BASF (SternVitamin), and the GAIN premix facility.

RUTFs are used by UNICEF Kid Power malnutrition program, which employ celebrities to raise awareness about the issue.

==== Dietary method ====
When used at home, RUTF paste is generally provided to malnorished children from 6 months to five years of age, usually for a period of 2 to 4 months. The daily amount is usually based on body mass at 175 kcal/kg/d.

The 2023 WHO Guideline recommends the use of RUTF at 150–185 kcal/kg/d until the child no longer suffers from edema and has acceptable anthropometrics (weight-for-height/length Z-score = -2), or the same amount until the child no longer suffers from edema and no longer qualifies as "severely wasted", at which point the amount is reduced to 100–130 kcal/kg/d until anthropometric recovery. There is a detailed rule in which some children (no danger signs, in stable condition, less severe edema, good appetite for RUTF) may be wholly treated at home using RUTF.

=== Effectiveness ===
As of 2013, Plumpy'Nut had been used to relieve malnutrition in thousands of African children, gaining approval as a therapeutic food from the World Health Organization.

RUTFs within the person's own home for the treatment of severe acute malnutrition in children under five years of age may be effective at improving weight gain and recovery when compared to alternative dietary approaches. The effectiveness of ready to use therapeutic food on potential relapses or on overall mortality is not clear as of 2019.

== Less-severe wasting ==
The UNICEF uses supplementary food in cases of moderate acute malnutrition. Unlike therapeutic food which is used alone in a diet (with water and in infants, breastmilk), supplementary food is intended for addition to existing diets.

- Ready-to-Use Supplementary Food (RUSF) spread, for use in moderate acute malnutrition in children 6 months and older.

The UNICEF also makes use of complementary food to improve the nutrition of children and adults, as an addition to their diets. The UNICEF uses the following kinds of complementary food:

- Emergency food ration, a standard fortified high energy biscuit. Acceptable for 6 months (when mixed with water into porridge) and older.
- Fortified biscuits, intended as general food distribution, school feeding, and use in emergencies. Can help complement the lack of micronutrients in other ration foods and prevent micronutrient deficiency in school-aged children.
- Super Cereal CSB+, a fortified blend of maize and defatted soy flours with 10% added sugar for cooking into a porridge or gruel. For 3-year-olds and older.
- Super Cereal Plus CSB++, a fortified blend of maize, defatted soy flours and skimmed milk with 10% added sugar for cooking into a porridge or gruel. For 6 months and older.
- Liquid-based Nutritional Supplement (LNS-SQ) "lipid nut", fortified food rich in proteins, fat, vitamins, and minerals for prevention of malnutrition in at-risk children 6 months and older.

The UNICEF also has a Ready-to-Use Infant Formula (RUIF) for replacement of breastmilk in orphans. It is packaged in liquid form.

Fortified blended foods (which includes the CSB+/CSB++) and lipid-based nutritional supplements (LNS, which includes RUTF, RUSF, and "lipid nut") are included in the WHO Guideline as acceptable for moderate wasting. LNS is the preferred option. The WHO recommends targeted use of all these specially-formulated foods in prevention of malnutrition.

== Examples ==
- Non-RU TFs
  - K-Mix 2, a high energy food, developed by UNICEF in the 1960s
- RUTFs
  - Citadel spread, a paste of peanuts, oil, sugar and milk powder in use since 1971
  - Plumpy'nut, a solid RUTF, made in France since 1996 for treatment of severe acute malnutrition
  - Medika Mamba, an enriched peanut butter therapeutic food produced and distributed by Meds and Food for Kids in Haiti since 2003
  - BP-100, a nutrient-fortified wheat-and-oat bar designed to provide a similar nutritional profile to F-100 by the World Health Organization
- Complementary food
  - Nutribun, a fortified bread product developed by United States Agency for International Development and distributed at schools under the Food for Peace program
