= F-100 and F-75 (foods) =

Therapeutic milk formulas designed to treat severe malnutrition

F-100 and F-75 (also known as Formula 100 and Formula 75) are therapeutic milk products designed to treat severe malnutrition. The formula is used in therapeutic feeding centers where children are hospitalized for treatment. F-75 is considered the "starter" formula, and F-100 the "catch-up" formula. The designations mean that the product contains respectively 75 and 100 kcals per 100 ml. F-75 provides 75 kcal and 0.9 g protein per 100 mL, while F-100 provides 100 kcal and 2.9 g protein. Both are very high in energy, fat, and protein and provide a large amount of nutrients. Ingredients include concentrated milk powder, food oil (sometimes saturated fats), and dextrin vitamin complexes. The formulas may be prepared by mixing with the local water supply. There are other variants like Low Lactose F-75 and Lactose-Free F-75, which are used in case of persistent diarrhea in severe acute malnutrition. F-75 may be cereal-based in place of milk.

In 1994, Action Against Hunger/Action Contre la Faim (ACF) pioneered the use of milk formula F-100 for the treatment of severe acute malnutrition, now used by all major humanitarian aid organizations to treat acute malnutrition. As a result, the global mortality rate of severely malnourished children under the age of five has been reduced from 25% to 5%. F-100 and other therapeutic nutritional products are widely used by several humanitarian aid organizations, such as UNICEF, Action Against Hunger, Concern Worldwide, Valid International, and Médecins Sans Frontières, when treating severe malnutrition among vulnerable populations.
