= Health in Tanzania =

Life expectancy at birth in Tanzania

The 2010 maternal mortality rate per 100,000 births for Tanzania was 790. This is compared with 449 in 2008 and 610.2 in 1990. The UN Child Mortality Report 2011 reports a decrease in under-five mortality from 155 per 1,000 live births in 1990 to 76 per 1,000 live births in 2010, and in neonatal mortality from 40 per 1,000 live births to 26 per 1,000 live births. The aim of the report The State of the World's Midwifery is to highlight ways in which the Millennium Development Goals can be achieved, particularly Goal 4 – Reduce child mortality and Goal 5 – improve maternal health. In Tanzania there are only two midwives per 1,000 live births; and the lifetime risk of death during delivery for women is one in 23.

The Human Rights Measurement Initiative finds that Tanzania is fulfilling 76.7% of what it should be fulfilling for the right to health based on its level of income. When looking at the right to health with respect to children, Tanzania achieves 92.5% of what is expected based on its current income. In regards to the right to health amongst the adult population, the country achieves only 85.8% of what is expected based on the nation's level of income. Tanzania falls into the "very bad" category when evaluating the right to reproductive health because the nation is fulfilling only 51.7% of what the nation is expected to achieve based on the resources (income) it has available.

== Maternal and child health status ==
Both maternal and child health are interdependent and substantially contributing to high burden of mortality worldwide. Every year, 289,000 women die due to complications in pregnancy and childbirth, and 6.6 million children below 5 years of age die of complications in the newborn period and of common childhood diseases. Sub-Saharan Africa (SSA), which includes Tanzania, contribute higher proportion of maternal and child mortality. Due to considerable proportion of mortality being attributed by maternal and child health, the United Nations together with other international agencies incorporated the two into Millennium Development Goals (MDGs) 4 and 5. In this regard, Tanzania through the Ministry of Health and Social Welfare (MoHSW) adopted different strategies and efforts to promote safe motherhood and improve child survival. Similarly, in an effort to improve maternal and child health, Tanzania's government has declared maternal and child health services to be exempt from user fees in government facilities.

== Maternal health indicators ==
=== Maternal mortality ratio ===
Complications during pregnancy and childbirth are a leading cause of death and disability among women of reproductive age in developing countries. Statistically, maternal mortality contributes to only 2.3 per cent of the total mortality. The maternal mortality ratio (MMR) represents the risk associated with each pregnancy. MMR is estimated by using both number of maternal deaths and live births. Many low-income countries have no or very little data and modelling is used to obtain a national estimate. According to estimates in 2013, total maternal deaths and MMR in Tanzania were 7,900 and 410 per 100,000 live births respectively. In relation to MDG 5, Tanzania is supposed to reach the MMR of 230 per 100,000 live births by 2015. Reduction of maternal deaths is one of the main goals of the Tanzanian poverty reduction strategy and the health sector reform program, but progress has been slow. The slow progress in reducing maternal mortality on mainland Tanzania is compounded by the impact of the HIV/AIDS epidemic.

=== Antenatal care coverage ===
Good care during pregnancy is important for the health of the mother and the development of the unborn baby. Many health problems in pregnant women can be prevented, detected, and treated during antenatal care visits with trained health workers. The World Health Organization recommends a minimum of four antenatal care (ANC) visits. The Tanzania Demographic and Health Survey 2010 showed that 98 percent made at least one ANC visit and 43 percent made four or more visits.

=== Skilled birth deliveries ===
This indicator is directly linked to a process of giving birth by pregnant woman, and most of maternal mortality are likely to happen at this stage. Most maternal deaths result from haemorrhage, complications of unsafe abortion, pregnancy-induced hypertension, sepsis and obstructed labour. However, these proportions of causes for maternal deaths are likely to differ from one country to another. According to official estimates, more than 20 women die of pregnancy and childbirth-related complications every day in Tanzania. Ensuring that mothers have access to a skilled attendant during labour can dramatically reduce the risk of death for the mother and newborn child. In the 2010 Tanzania DHS, about 51% of deliveries were assisted by skilled personnel. While it was 41% in 1999 Tanzania DHS. Potentially the current figure national-wide will be more than 51 per cent. Shortage of health providers, among others, are limiting factors to be delivered by skilled provider. The ratio of doctors to patients in Tanzania is 1:25,000 and the ratio of nurses to patients is 1:23,000. While the ratio in the United States is 1:300. President Jakaya Kikwete in May 2014 appealed to health workers in Tanzania to ensure that lives of women and children are not at risk during delivery. In Tanzania, two thirds of women give birth in their own homes, because there are very few health facilities within reach that can provide life-saving emergency services.

=== Postnatal care coverage ===
Every year in Africa, at least 125,000 women and 870,000 newborns die in the first week after birth, yet this is when coverage and programmes are at their lowest along the continuum of care. Since up to 50 per cent of maternal deaths occurs after delivery, a midwife or a trained and supervised Traditional Birth Attendant (TBA) should visit all mothers as soon as possible within the first 24–48 hours after birth. The 2010 figure in utilizing postnatal care in Tanzania was only 31 per cent according to TDHS. Coverage of postnatal check-up within 4 hours after birth varies from 9 percent in the Lake zone to 34 percent in the Southern zone in Tanzania. Postnatal care (PNC) programmes are among the weakest of all reproductive and child health programmes in Tanzania and Sub-Saharan African in general. Given the absence of PNC guidelines in Tanzania, the Reproductive and Child Health Section (RCHS) of the Ministry of Health and Social Welfare [Tanzania] reported in 2009 that is in the process of developing it to be used country-wide.

=== Modern family planning use ===
The policy environment for family planning in Tanzania is mixed, but promising. At the 2012 London Summit on Family Planning, President Kikwete highlighted Tanzania's continued efforts to improve family planning. He mentioned the National Strategy for Growth and Reduction of Poverty (MKUKUTA II) which has a strong family planning component, and the National Family Planning Costed Implementation Plan (2010) which endeavors to reach a contraceptive prevalence target of 60% of all women by 2015 and will require $88.2 million between 2010 and 2015. Like many countries in sub-Saharan Africa, Tanzania's once successful family planning program has slowed markedly, with rates of contraceptive prevalence well below levels needed to reach current demand and country goals. In Tanzania, 34.4 percent of married women in 2010 reported use of any method of contraception, while modern methods reached a prevalence of 27.4 per cent. Factors limiting contraceptive prevalence in Tanzania include widespread misconceptions and concerns about side-effects, low acceptance of long–acting methods, erratic supplies and a limited range of choices, gaps in provider knowledge and skills (along with provider bias), competing priorities pursuing scarce resources, limited male involvement, poor communication between spouses, and the perceived value of large families also contribute to low use of family planning methods.

== Child health indicators ==
=== Infant and under-five mortality rate ===
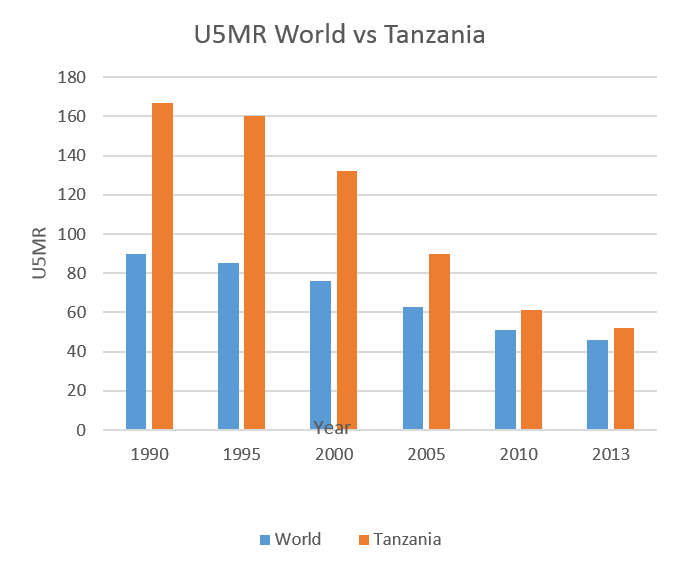
A comparison of Under5 mortality between Tanzania and the world

Children in sub-Saharan Africa are about over 16 times more likely to die before the age of five than children in developed regions. Tanzania has reduced the infant mortality rate (IMR) of 101 to 38 per 1000 live births from 1990 to 2012 respectively. Also, it has reduced substantially the under-five mortality rate (U5MR) of 166 to 54 per 1000 live births from 1990 to 2012 respectively.

Malaria is the leading cause of death for Tanzanian children and is a major cause of maternal mortality. Tanzania is making considerable progress in the reduction of child mortality. In that respect, Tanzania is likely to achieve MDG 4 of reducing child mortality. The most significant contribution to the reduction of under-five mortality is improved control measures of malaria, Acute Respiratory Infections, diarrhea; improved personal hygiene, environmental sanitation; and preventive, promotive as well as curative health services. Tanzania's average annual rate of reduction of child mortality over the last 15 years was 4.6%, while, the Millennium Development Goal rate set by UN is an annual average rate of reduction of 4.3 percent.

=== Vaccination coverage ===
There have been improvements in the planning process, community ownership and involvement, improving coverage, effective mobilization of funds for the Expanded Program of Immunisation, improvements in the safety of vaccine delivery and introduction of new and underutilized vaccines. According to 2010 Demographic and Health Survey in Tanzania, 66% at 12 months of age were fully immunised during the survey. The 2010 DHS in Tanzania which is the latest, presents the BCG coverage of 95.5%, DPT vaccine coverage of 88%; Polio (Pol3) coverage of 84.9% and Measles coverage of 84.5%. The proportion of children vaccinated against measles increased from 80% in 2005 to 85% in 2010. But the vaccination coverage in Tanzania presented to be more than 90% for each of the above vaccines according to World Health Organization in 2012.

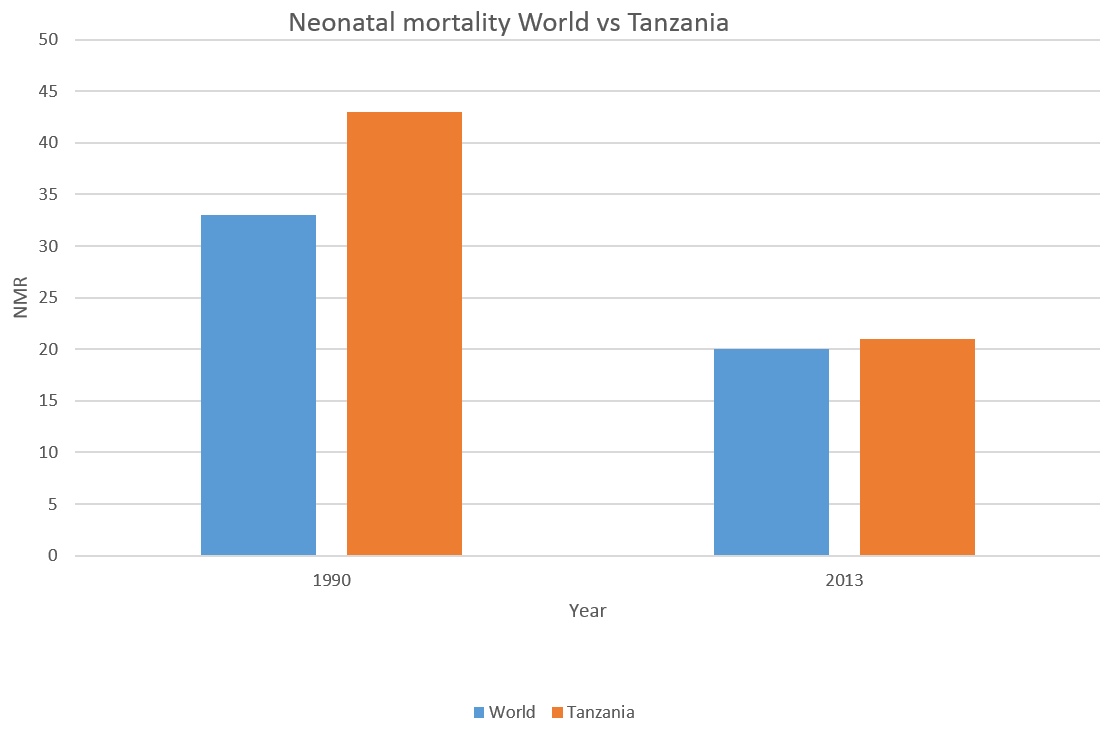
World vs Tanzania Neonatal Mortality rate

Year	BCG	DTP3	Pol3	Measles
DHS 2010	95.5%	88.0%	84.9%	84.5%
WHO 2012	99.0%	92.0%	90.0%	97.0%

The government of Tanzania via the Minister of Health and Social Welfare, has urged in 2012 partners and stakeholders in the country to join the National Immunization Coordination Committee to ensure that all children in Tanzanian are covered.

An Electronic Immunisation Register has been established, which permits online access to the medical records of mothers and infants, enabling vaccination teams in remote areas to operate more effectively, especially with nomadic people. It also helps to coordinate stock levels and order new supplies.

=== Exclusive breastfeeding ===
In Tanzania by 2010, breastfeeding was initiated within the first hour of birth in 46.1% of mothers. Over 97 percent of mothers in Tanzania do breastfeed, however, the prevalence of exclusive breastfeeding in infants aged 0–6 months is 50 percent. Although the national average reported to be 50% prevalence, one regional study focusing on Kilimanjaro region only revealed the general prevalence of 88.1% at one month, 65.5% at three months and 20.7% for an infant of six months of age, which is very low and did not vary between rural and urban. A multivariate analysis using 2010 TDHS data revealed that the risk of delayed initiation of breastfeeding within 1 hour after birth was significantly higher among young mothers aged <24 years, uneducated and employed mothers from rural areas who delivered by caesarean section and those who delivered at home and were assisted by traditional birth attendants or relatives. The risk factors associated with non-exclusive breastfeeding, during the first 6 months, were lack of professional assistance at birth and residence in urban areas.

=== Child malnutrition ===
Malnutrition in Tanzania is a contributing factor in an estimated 130 child deaths every day. According to 2010 TDHS, about 42 percent of children are stunted, 16 percent are underweight and 5 percent are wasted. Different efforts have been adopted in Tanzania to improve children nutrition status. Within a one-year interval from 2010 and 2011, significant reduction in malnutrition observed. In 2011 according to World Health Organization (WHO) estimates on child malnutrition in Tanzania, children aged <5 years stunted was 34.8% in 2011; underweight was 13.6% in 2011; wasted was 6.6% in 2011 and overweight was 5.5% in 2010. Some regions in Tanzania like Iringa, Mbeya and Rukwa are among the five regions with the highest stunting and are all areas with high food production. The case in Tanzania, is inconsistent with the common assumption that increasing agriculture and food production will automatically lead to improvements in nutrition.

=== Neonatal and under-five mortality 2030 ===
Reducing the number of children dying before their fifth birthday has been targeted in the Sustainable Development Goals under the health related goals. Tanzania has made an improvement in attaining the reduction of child mortality; however, based on the Sustainable Development Goals, the country should further reduce in exact numbers the neonatal and under-five mortality rates by 2030.

==== Sustainable Development Goals ====
Sustainable development goals have been developed as a new development agenda after the expiration of the Millennium Development Goals in 2015. The third sustainable development goal aims to enhance healthy lives and promote wellbeing for all at all ages.

==== SDG 3, target 3.2 ====
The health related Sustainable Development Goal 3, target 3.2 targets a reduction of neonatal mortality to 12 per 1000 live births and under five mortality rate to 25 per 1000 live births by 2030. The world under five mortality rate has declined from 90 in 1990 to 46 in 2013. In Tanzania, the U5MR has declined from 167 in 1990 to 52 in 2013. The country ranks the 48 in the world in 2013 in under five mortality out of 194 countries. Figure 1 shows a comparison of under five mortality rate between the World and Tanzania with data from State of the World's Children 2015 Report and WHO, Global Health Observatory Data Repository. Figure 2 shows a comparison of Neonatal Mortality rates between the World and Tanzania with data from UNICEF 2013 Child Mortality Report.

== HIV/AIDS ==
New HIV/AIDS Infections versus HIV/AIDS Deaths from 1990 to 2015

Tanzania faces generalized HIV epidemic which means it affects all sections of the society but also concentrated epidemic among certain population groups. The prevalence of HIV/AIDS in Tanzania is characterised by substantial difference across age, gender, geographical location and socioeconomic status implying variation in the risk of transmission of infection. In 2019, among 1.7 million people living with HIV/AIDS, the prevalence was 4.6% and 58,000 new HIV infection among 15 – 49 years old, and 6,500 new infections among children below 15 years old, 50% of all new infections are between 15 – 29 years of age group. Report from Tanzania PHIA of 2016–17 shows that HIV prevalence among women is higher (6.2%) than men (3.1%). The prevalence of HIV is less than 2% among 15–19 years for both males and females and then increases with age for both sexes.

Prevalence of HIV/AIDS has declined from 7% in 2003 to 4.8% in 2018. Burden of HIV/AIDS is higher in urban areas (7.5%) as compared to rural areas (4.5%). The region with the highest prevalence is Njombe estimated to 11.4% followed by Iringa 11.3% and Mbeya (9.3%) while Lindi has the lowest HIV prevalence of less than 1%. In 2019 there were 27,000 HIV/AIDS related deaths. For children below 15 years there were 1,246 deaths and among 15 – 49 years of age there were up to 18,348 deaths.

== Malaria ==
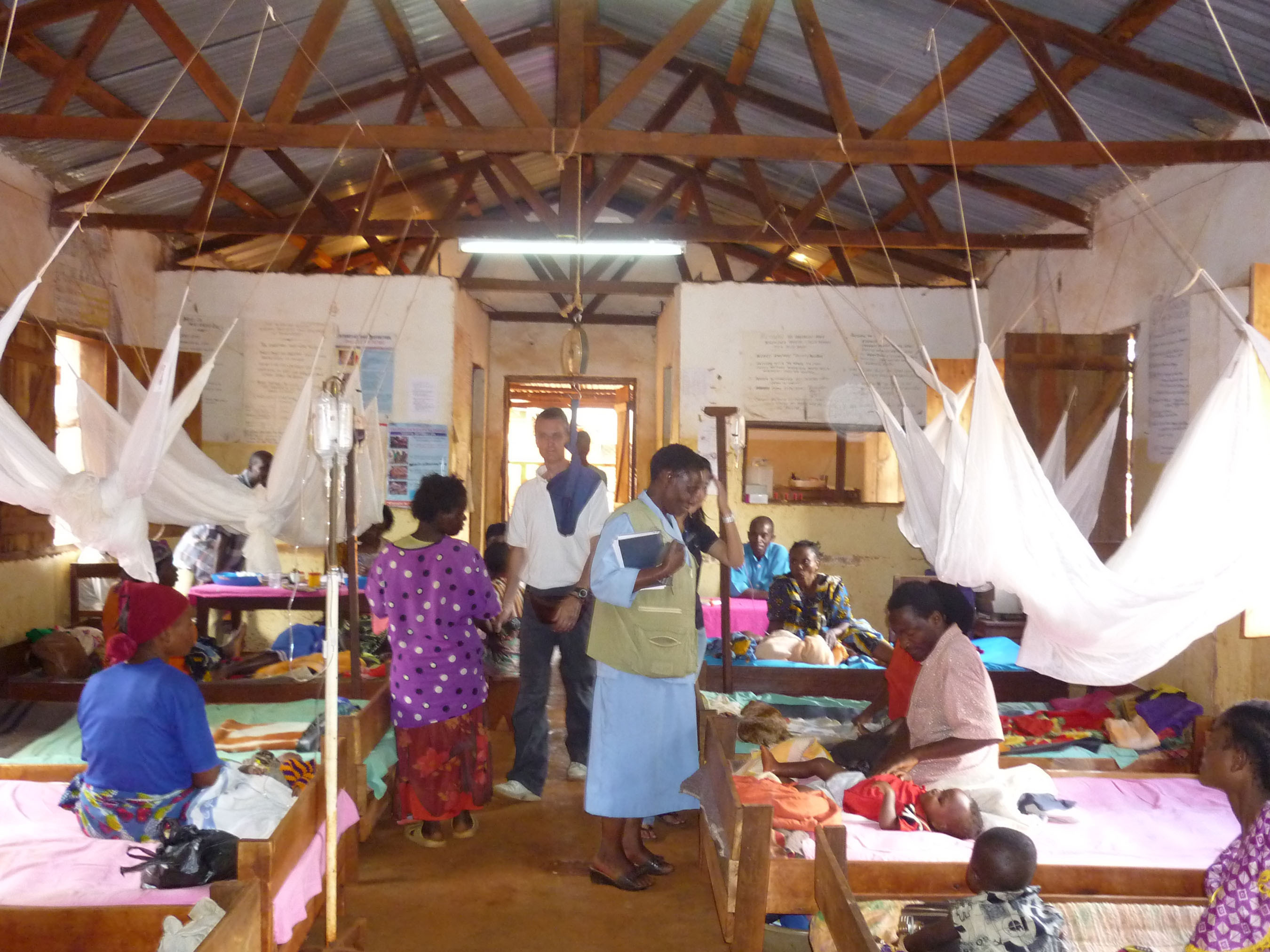
Malaria Clinic in Tanzania in partnership with SMS for Life program which organizes malaria vaccine delivery

Malaria exists throughout the year and is predominantly due to P. falciparum. The country had a decline of malaria cases over the years from 18.1% in 2001 to 9.7% in 2009 in under 5 year olds and this is seen in the reduction of under 5 mortality rates which decreased from 165/ 100,000 in 1990 to 49/ 100,000 in 2015. This decrease in malaria prevalence is also shown in the Demographic and Health Survey and Malaria Indicator Survey 2015–16 (DHS-MIS 2015–16) with a 14% prevalence in 2015. This varied from Kagera's 41% and Geita's 38% to Zanzibar's <1%. It is also 18% in the rural area and urban 4% and also highest in the poorest quintile (23%) and lowest among the richest quintile (1%).

== Diarrhoeal diseases ==
For the year 2014, 6% of the deaths in Tanzania were attributed to diarrhoeal diseases. It is imperative to reduce diarrheal diseases if the country is to achieve the Sustainable Development Goals. In the UNICEF Pneumonia and Diarrhea Report 2016, there are strategies outlined for the low income countries to adopt in the fight against these two leading killer diseases.

== Lower respiratory tract infections ==
This is listed as the second leading cause of mortality in Tanzania according to the CDC Tanzania Global Health Facts. According to the Demographic and Health Survey and Malaria Indicator Survey 2015–16, there have been no changes over time of occurrence of LRTIs. However, the EPI has included the pentavalent vaccine which protects against Haemophilus influenzae, a common cause of pneumonia.

== Tuberculosis ==
There were 327/100,000 new cases of TB in 2014, up from 236/100,000 in 2001. The case detection rate dropped to 36% in 2014 from 68% in 2001 Demographic and Health Survey and Malaria Indicator Survey 2015–16. TB deaths have increased from 17/100,000 in 2001 to 58/100,000 in 2014. (These cases were in HIV negative people.) Tuberculosis accounted for 5% of deaths in Tanzania in 2014.

== Non communicable diseases ==
Tanzania has seen an increase of non communicable diseases as some of the leading causes of death. The major ones by contribution include: cancer 5%, ischemic heart disease 3% and stroke 3%. The double burden of disease is causing an extra strain to the already fragile health system that is struggling to cope with the scourge of communicable diseases and high child and maternal mortality and morbidity.

== Occupational health ==
Tanzania is a United Republic of Former Tanganyika (currently referred to Tanganyika mainland) and Zanzibar. The estimated population has dramatically increased from 12.3 to 44.9 million people from 1967 to 2012 respectively (Figure 1. below). The current working group (15– 64 years of age) of is estimated to be 52.2%. The National economy still depend mostly on agriculture that holds up to 40% of gross domestic product (GDP). Agriculture sector employs 76.5% of workforce in the Country; Industry sector (4.3%); and services (19.2%).

Figure 1:Tanzania population growth since 1967- 2012

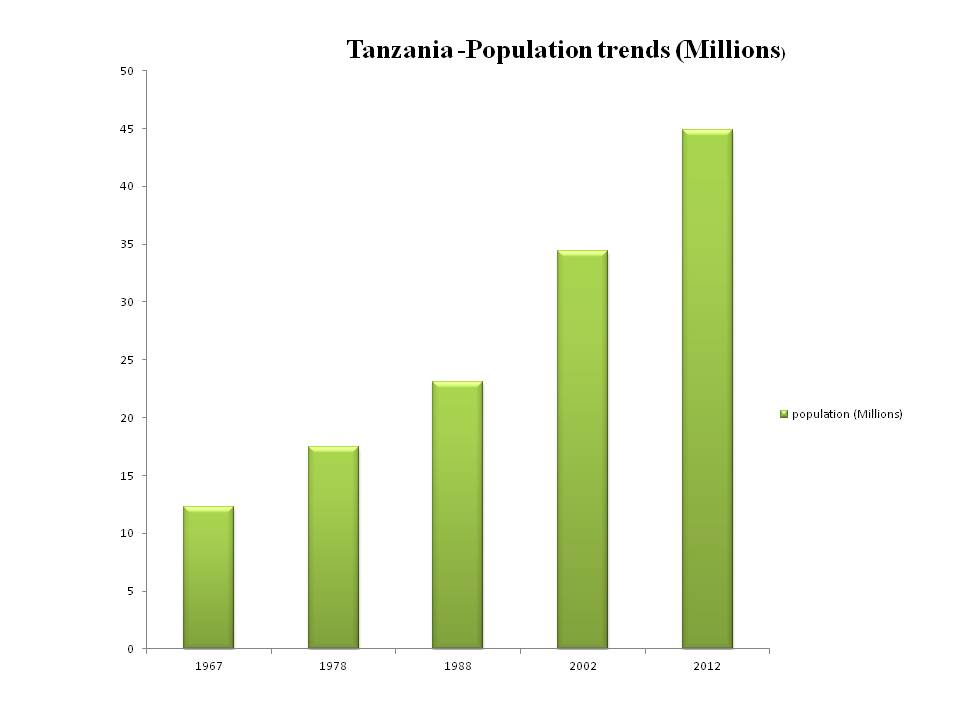
The figure shows the population growth trends for Tanzania from 1967 to 2012

=== Occupational health in Tanzania perspective ===
The country had been operating under Factories Ordinances Cap. 297 of 1950 that provided for occupational health and safety standards in the country. Through various sector reform programmes, The National established Occupational Health and Safety Authority under The Executive Agency Act No. 30 of 1997 which become officially operational late 2001. Moreover, in 2003 the Occupational Health and Safety Act No. 5 was enacted giving the authority mandatory objectives of providing the safety, health and welfare of persons at work in factories and other places of work; to provide for the protection of persons other than persons at work against hazards to health and safety arising out of or in connection with activities of persons at work.

Other initiatives the country has gone through includes incorporation of occupational health and safety matters in other Principal legislation such as The Tropical Pesticides Research Institute Act of 1979; The Pharmaceuticals and Poison Act of 1978; The Atomic Energy Act of 2003, The Industrial and Consumer Chemicals Act of 1985; The Mining Act of 2010 and Employment and labour relation Act No.6 of 2004 with subsequent establishment of Labour Court (being part of The High Court of Tanzania).

In 2008 another important step was made – the establishment of Workers' Compensation Fund through Workers Compensation Act No. 20 of 2008 with objectives of providing for compensation to employees for disablement of death caused by or result from injuries or diseases sustained or contracted in the course of employment; to establish Fund for administration and regulation of workers compensation and to provide for related matter.

The International Labour Organization (ILO), estimates that more than 2.3 million people die of work-related accidents and diseases every year and 317 million accidents annually occur due to workplace hazards. The figures further explain that out of 2.34 million occupational fatalities every year; only 321,000 are due to accidents, the remaining 2.02 million deaths are caused by various types of work-related diseases, which correspond to a daily average between 5,500 up to 6,000 deaths.

=== Occupational injuries ===
Every individual worker needs good working environment that is safe and free from any kind of life - threatening hazards. This may be possible where most if not all health risks are identified at workplace and correct measures are put in place and adhered by all workers around. Mining sector is fast growing in a country and significant number of workers both in conventional and small scale mining are employed. The sector contributes up to 40% of country's export and it was estimated to contribute up to 7.7% of national GDP by end of 2015.

Status of occupational accidents and injuries varies considerably between different sources. It is estimated that in mining/quarry, the injury rate is 17 per 1,000 workers whereas Industry sector is responsible for 10.1% of total occupational accidents, 9.6% of fatalities, 12.2% of partial disabilities and about 7.4% of temporary disability and the injury rate is 9.9 per 1,000 workers.

Report from National Audit office (NAO) showed that construction/building industry had highest Fatality rate of 23.7% followed by Transport and mining/quarrying that had 20.6% and 20.5 respectively (table 1 below). Injuries in transport sector is another life-threatening risk that continues to claim lives of people especially motorcyclist and public transport (buses). however the major challenge in these information is validity and reliability as the reporting and data keeping system in Tanzania is not well coordinated.

Table 1: Fatality Rate sectorwise

Sector	Total employees	Number of Fatal Injuries	Fatality rate (%)
Agriculture, forestry, Fishing	13,890,054	16	0.12
Mining and quarrying	29,223	6	20.53
Commerce and distribution	2,486,818	12	0.48
Manufacturing	245,449	28	11.41
Construction/building	151,690	36	23.73
Transport	111,671	23	20.61
Total	16,914,805	121

Source: NAO report- Performance Audit Report on the Management of Occupational Health and Safety in Tanzania, 2013.

The presented information may be challenged by several other factors as reporting system is not well functional. There were a total of 6,599 registered workplaces equivalent to 24% of eligible workplaces. This challenges is a challenge to The Authority dealing with Occupational safety and Health in Tanzania. Accelerated development as a result of new large discoveries and investments in oil, gas and uranium and expected spill - over effects calls for serious investments in this areas as more workers will be involved and exposure to occupational hazards will need serious interventions.

== See also ==
- Healthcare in Tanzania
- HIV/AIDS in Tanzania
- Rabies in Tanzania
- COVID-19 pandemic in Tanzania
