= Child health and nutrition in Africa =

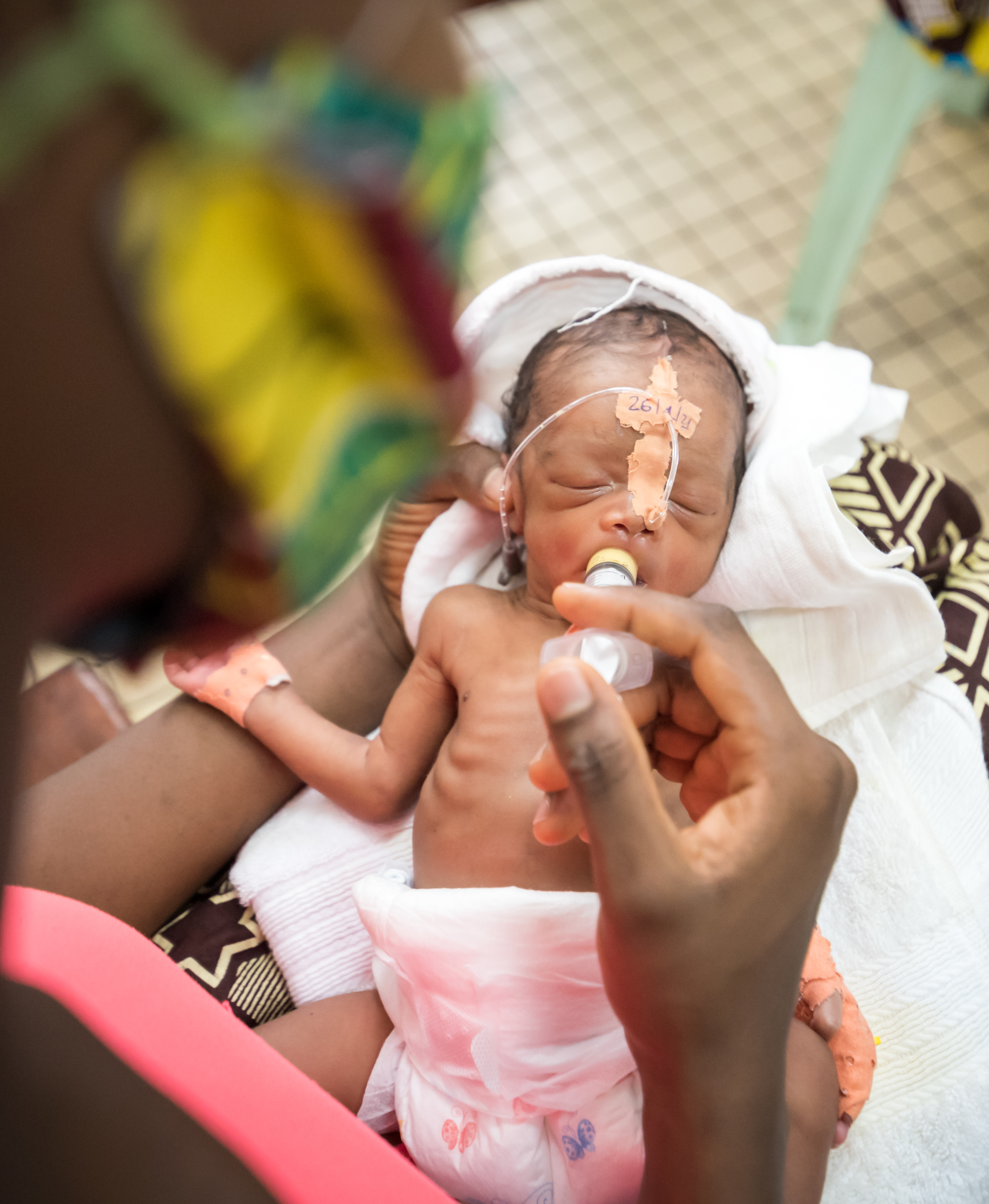
Malnourished infant

Child health and nutrition in Africa is concerned with the health care of children through adolescents in the various countries of Africa. The right to health and a nutritious and sufficient diet are internationally recognized human rights that are protected by international treaties. Millennium Development Goals (MDGs) 1, 4, 5 and 6 highlight, respectively, how poverty, hunger, child mortality, maternal health, the eradication of HIV/AIDS, malaria, tuberculosis and other diseases are of particular significance in the context of child health.

Despite these commitments and ideals, however, the reality is that high mortality among young children, particularly in Africa, continues to be a cause for concern. Children born in developed countries such as Sweden have a less than 1 per cent risk of dying before the age of 1 year, whereas for children born in developing countries, the risk is closer to 10 per cent or higher. Within developing countries, there are significant disparities between rich and poor and urban and rural areas. These large differences are likely the result of initial and continuous colonial control across Africa.

Malnutrition has had, and continues to have, a long and complicated history, most of which has stemmed from the initial imposition of colonial rule. With added European influence, African farmers were instructed about how and what to cultivate on the land. One method of farming that was implemented and promoted throughout much of the continent was monocropping, or utilizing cash crops. Cash crops are the production of crops for commercial use rather than for personal consumption. This practice often consists of mainstream crops that are grown year after year on the same plot of land, leading to a lack of diversity, soil erosion and soil depletion. By requiring that farmers switch to new crops and new farming methods, malnutrition rates skyrocketed.

== Extent and gravity of child health and nutrition in Africa ==
Worldwide, substantial progress has been made in the effort to reduce child mortality. The number of under-5 deaths in the world has declined from nearly 12 million in 1990 to 6.9 million in 2011; and the global under-five mortality rate has dropped 41 per cent since 1990 – from 87 deaths per 1,000 live births in 1990 to 51 in 2011. The leading causes of death among children under age 5 are pneumonia (18 per cent), preterm birth complications (14 per cent), diarrhoea (11 per cent), complications during birth (9 per cent), and malaria (7 per cent). Globally, more than one third of under-5 deaths are attributable to undernutrition.

In Africa, some progress has also been registered over the decades. Compared to other regions, sub-Saharan Africa has experienced a faster rate of reduction in under-5 deaths, with the annual rate of decline doubling between 1990–2000 and 2000–2011. However, child mortality figures in sub-Saharan Africa are still sobering. The region alone accounts for 3,370,000 deaths of children under 5 in 2011 (WHO, 2012) which corresponds to 9,000 children dying every day, and six children dying every minute. Out of 3 million neonatal deaths worldwide, approximately 1.1 million are found in sub-Saharan Africa (WHO, 2012). The highest rates of child mortality are in sub-Saharan Africa, where 1 in 9 children dies before age 5; and 1 in 16 children in Southern Asia.

== Deficiency in essential nutrients and micronutrients ==
The prevalence of malnutrition and related health conditions among children in Africa leads to a plethora of diseases that impact the child and their development. Given that vitamin A is critical for proper functioning of the visual system and for maintaining immune defences, its deficiency remains a public health issue. An estimated 250,000 to 500,000 children deficient in vitamin A become blind every year, half of them dying within 12 months of losing their sight. This deficiency accounts for 350 million cases of blindness and 670,000 deaths globally (WHO, 2001). In Africa alone, it contributes to 23 per cent of child deaths. In 2009, the prevalence of low serum retinol, associated with vitamin A deficiency, was 37.7 per cent in Ethiopia, 49 per cent in the Congo, and 42 per cent in Madagascar. The immediate causes of this deficiency are the low rates of consumption of animal products, the poor bioavailability of vitamin A in cereal-based diets, the consumption of green leaves with low lipid content, and an increased bodily demand for vitamin A owing to the infections that frequently affect African children (Manga, 2011).

There are equally disturbing levels of zinc deficiencies which has extreme adverse effects on growth, the risk and severity of infections, as well as the level of immune function. Although the actual prevalence is unclear, zinc deficiency is recognized as one of the main risk factors for morbidity and mortality. It contributes to over 450,000 deaths per year among children under 5 years, particularly in sub-Saharan Africa. It affected 57 per cent of children under 5 in Senegal, 72 per cent in Burkina Faso, and 41.5 per cent in Nigeria in 2004. The main causes of this deficiency in children are a lack of zinc-rich easily absorbed foodstuffs (such as meat, poultry, seafood) and the over-consumption of foodstuffs that inhibit zinc absorption, such as cereals, roots and tubers, which are among Africa's staples.

Inadequacies in iodine intake on the other hand impair the synthesis of thyroid hormones, which are critical for normal development and proper functioning of the brain and nervous system as well as the conservation of body heat and energy. Iodine deficiency causes endemic goitre and cretinism as well as stunting of mental and physical development. Globally, 1.6 million people are at risk of iodine deficiency disorders and 50 million children affected by them. About 100,000 children are born each year with intellectual disability, most of them in Africa. This is due to the low consumption of iodine-rich foodstuffs (e.g. marine products) and the over-consumption of foodstuffs causing goitre, particularly bitter cassava, which is a staple in Central Africa.

Child undernutrition itself takes three common forms: stunting, wasting, and being underweight. Stunting is low height that results from insufficient nutrient intake, wasting is low weight which indicates body mass and fat deficit, and being underweight is a measure that includes the effects of both stunting and wasting.

Anaemia is quite prevalent in Africa especially among young children due mainly to a diet that is low in animal-based foodstuffs and high in fibre-rich cereals, tannins and phytates which inhibit iron absorption. In 2006, about 67.6 per cent of children under 5, and overall 83.5 million children were anaemic. Through its effects on metabolic processes such as oxygen transport, oxidative metabolism and cell growth, iron deficiency physical retards growth and development. It impairs the immune response and increases susceptibility to infection, delays motor development, and diminishes concentration, thereby impairing cognitive and behavioural capacities). It therefore prevents 40–60 per cent of African children from attaining their full mental capacities. Moreover, of the 26 health risks reported by the WHO Global Burden of Disease project, iron deficiency is ranked ninth in terms of years of life lost.

== Preventive interventions ==
=== Breastfeeding ===
Breast milk is the ideal natural food for optimal growth and safe psychomotor development. This is due to its rich nutrients and protective factors, as well as its biospecificity (the kinetics of its composition change during lactation) and impact on mother-child relationships. These key advantages reduce child mortality rate by 13 per cent in areas where over 80 per cent of women breastfeed exclusively.

=== Supplementary feeding ===
Undernourished children have lowered resistance to infection and are at greater risk of common childhood diseases such as diarrhoeal diseases, respiratory infections, recurring sickness and faltering growth, often with irreversible damage to their cognitive and social development. For current and future generations, good nutrition is a cornerstone for survival, health and development. Well-nourished children set off on a better developmental path (both physically and mentally), perform better in school, grow into healthier adults and are able to give their own children a better start in life. Supplementary feeding, when properly implemented, helps to reduce the mortality rate of children under 5 by 6 per cent.

=== Long-lasting insecticidal nets (LLINs) ===
The prevention of malaria through the use of LLINs is a key strategy for rolling back malaria in Africa. According to model-generated estimates based on the number of LLINs supplied by the manufacturers, the number distributed by national malaria control programmes and data from household surveys, the percentage of households with at least one LLIN in sub-Saharan Africa increased from 3 per cent in 2000 to 50 per cent in 2011. Coverage rates of more than 80 per cent can reduce Africa's child mortality rate by 7 per cent.

=== Vaccination against Haemophilusinfluenzae type b (Hib) ===
Hib, meningitis and respiratory infections are frequent and serious on account of their high mortality rates and potential consequences, which include sensorineural damage. These infections can be prevented by vaccination to reduce child mortality by 4 per cent. Hib vaccination is part of the Expanded Programme on Immunization (EPI) together with vaccines against tuberculosis, poliomyelitis, diphtheria, tetanus, hepatitis B, measles and yellow fever. EPI is a key preventive intervention in reducing infant morbidity and mortality; together with the monitoring and promotion of growth, it is a fundamental pillar in child health and development.

=== Prevention of mother-to-child transmission of HIV ===
The 25 per cent prevalence of HIV in some eastern and southern African countries is a matter of concern. African countries that showed more than 20 per cent adult HIV prevalence in 2011 included Botswana (23.4 per cent), Lesotho (23.3 per cent) and Eswatini (26 per cent) (UNICEF, 2013). Globally, the number of new HIV infections continues to fall annually, although there is considerable regional variation. In sub-Saharan Africa, where most of those newly infected with HIV live, it is estimated that 1.9 million (1,700,000 – 2,100,000) people were infected in 2010. According to estimates, this represents a 16 per cent decrease compared to the number of new infections with HIV in 2001, which was 2.2 million (2,100,000-2,400,000), and a 27 per cent decrease compared to the number of new infections between 1996 and 1998, when the incidence of HIV infection in the region peaked.

The vast majority of children are infected before birth, during pregnancy, labour or breastfeeding (if the mother is seropositive). The course of HIV and AIDS is particularly aggressive in children. Without care and treatment, the virus multiplies and destroys the child's immune system, lowering resistance to infections such as pneumonia and other common childhood diseases. Almost half of all children infected by their mothers die before the age of 2. Thanks to a decrease in the price of drugs, increased awareness, the introduction of fixed-dose combinations of anti-retrovirals (ARVs) and more reliable forecasts of demand for paediatric ARVs, several countries have been able to distribute them for use in children, but the coverage rate remains extremely low in Africa.

=== Food fortification ===
Food fortification is a cost-effective way of ensuring that a population receives adequate nutrients without altering their usual dietary practices. WHO recommends mass fortification of salt with iodine to prevent iodine deficiency in both children and adults. Fortification of other foods such as flour and cooking oil has been suggested and implemented in some countries, but salt iodization has been the most successful in terms of implementation and benefits in Sub Saharan Africa. Micronutrient powders (MNPs) for point of use fortification, contain a mixture of vitamins and minerals. They are added on to ready to eat semi solid foods such as porridge, without altering the original taste. This intervention reduces iron deficiency anemia in children between six and twenty-three months of age.

=== Zinc supplements ===
The role of zinc in strengthening immune defenses cannot be underestimated and in areas where effective preventive supplementation campaigns have been implemented, particularly in Africa, the child mortality rate has been lowered by 4 per cent.

=== Vitamin A supplement ===
Biannual vitamin A supplements can help to reduce mortality among young children by 23 per cent.

== Curative interventions ==
=== Oral rehydration solutions ===
Oral rehydration is considered one of the greatest revolutions in improving child health and managing diarrhoea. With new oral rehydration solutions containing zinc, child mortality can be reduced by 15 per cent.

=== Therapeutic feeds ===
F75 and F100 are types of therapeutic milk that is used in inpatient management of severe acute malnutrition. They differ in concentrations of ingredients and amount of energy. Ready to use therapeutic food (RUTF) is made from a variety of macro- and micro-nutrients that help malnourished children effectively gain weight. RUTF is considered a promising new method for managing severe acute malnutrition. Additionally, RUTF is beneficial because it is dehydrated and sealed, allowing it to have a longer shelf life and limiting the spread of bacteria. These RUTFs may be used as part of a community based food and nutrition program.

=== Antibiotics to treat pneumonia ===
The improved availability of antibiotics to treat pneumonia, particularly in remote areas and among deprived populations, has contributed to reducing the child mortality rate by 6 per cent.

Other curative interventions which can help to reduce child mortality include antibiotics to treat sepsis (6 per cent), the use of artemisinin-based combination therapies to treat malaria (5 per cent) and antibiotics to treat dysentery (2 per cent).

These interventions are highly beneficial to child health and development. However, coverage rates remain low due to underdevelopment and poverty, poor health care systems with limited access to health services (less than 40 per cent in most African countries), a lack of qualified human resources resulting in part from the brain drain to Western and Arab countries, inadequate equipment, an inconsistent supply of medications and basic products with frequent shortages, a poorly structured and barely functioning programme of health promotion, and limited budgets for health (less than the 15 per cent recommended by WHO for most African countries) combined with often unorthodox financial governance.

== Main strategies ==
The strategies outlined below are recommended by WHO and adopted by all African countries as part of a bolder approach to serious child health problems. Their strengths reside in the complementarity of components integrated into strategies, the effectiveness in reducing child mortality and morbidity, and the positive long-term impact generated for children, such as enhanced school performance, well-being and life chances. These strategies offer an immediate return while having a significant impact on the future.

=== Integrated Management of Childhood Illness (IMCI) ===
IMCI is a strategy that integrates various programmes for the survival of children under 5 with a view to improving the practices that are likely to have the greatest impact on their health, growth and development. This is the overarching strategy for achieving MDG 4 (reduction of child mortality), and it is recommended by WHO and UNICEF, particularly in countries with a high child mortality rate. The strategy is simple and, according to the World Bank, cost-effective. It aims to address the main causes of child mortality in settings characterized by (1) a low level of health coverage, with little or no access to diagnostic equipment and treatment, (2) a low level of health monitoring, and (3) weak links between healthcare facilities and communities. IMCI has three components: (1) improving the skills of health care workers, (2) strengthening the health care system, and (3) improving family and community practices.

=== Emergency Obstetric and Neonatal Care (EmONC) ===
Maternal and neonatal mortality in the Africa region accounts for more than half (51 per cent) of the world's total maternal deaths, with a neonatal mortality rate of approximately 40 per thousand. The causes of these deaths could be prevented or avoided by the proper implementation of strategies for skilled care at birth and emergency obstetric and neonatal care services. With the assistance of WHO, UNICEF, UNFPA and the World Bank, various African countries have developed roadmaps for accelerating the reduction of maternal and neonatal mortality by improving the skills of service providers, standardizing treatment protocols, and developing quality criteria for EmONC.

While effective interventions and strategies for improving the health and nutrition status of young children are available, the financial resources required to implement them in Africa are inadequate. It is essential that African governments, their domestic partners (the private sector and civil society) and their partners abroad (bilateral and multilateral cooperation) invest more heavily in mobilizing resources for early childhood development. The focus should be on optimal governance of financial resources with transparent management rules and particular emphasis on equity of care and guaranteed access for the poor.

== See also ==
- Maternal and child health in Tanzania
- Human nutrition
- Malnutrition
- Nutrition and HIV/AIDS
- Malnutrition in South Africa
- Global health
- Global Strategy for Women's and Children's Health

== Sources ==
This article incorporates text from a free content work. Licensed under CC-BY-SA IGO 3.0 (license statement/permission). Text taken from Investing against Evidence: The Global State of Early Childhood Care and Education, 170–182, Marope, P.T.M., Kaga, Y., UNESCO. UNESCO.
