= IMCI =

IMCI may refer to:

- International Marine Certification Institute, a certification organisation to serve the interests of the recreational boating industry
- Integrated Management of Childhood Illness, an approach to children's health which focuses on the whole child
- Initial Many Core Instructions, a processor instruction extension for Intel's 64-bit architecture based on SIMD instructions
