= Child mortality in Ghana =

Child Mortality in Ghana describes the child mortality in the country of Ghana. Like in other parts of the world, child mortality is declining in Ghana.

== Definition ==
Child mortality, which is also known as under-5 mortality, refers to the death of infants and children under the age of five. In 2011, 6.9 million children under five died, down from 7.6 million in 2010, 8.1 million in 2009, and 12.4 million in 1990. About half of child deaths occur in Sub-Saharan Africa. Reduction of child mortality was the fourth of the United Nations' Millennium Development Goals. Child Mortality Rate is the highest in low-income countries, especially countries in Sub-Saharan Africa. Many deaths in the third world go unrecorded since many poor families cannot afford to deliver in hospitals due to inaccessibility and misconceptions.

== History and background ==
Historically, Ghana has the full range of diseases endemic to a sub-Saharan country. According to WHO, common diseases include cholera, typhoid, pulmonary tuberculosis, anthrax, pertussis, tetanus, chicken pox, yellow fever, measles, infectious hepatitis, trachoma, malaria, and schistosomiasis. Others are guinea worm or dracunculiasis, various kinds of dysentery, river blindness or onchocerciasis, numerous kinds of pneumonia, dehydration, venereal diseases, and poliomyelitis. According to a 1974 report, more than 75 percent of all preventable diseases at that time were waterborne. In addition, malnutrition and diseases acquired through insect bites continued to be common. WHO lists malaria and measles as the leading causes of premature death in Ghana. Among children under five years of age, 70 percent of deaths are caused by infections compounded by malnutrition.

However, under five mortality remains a prominent concern of global health even though Millennium Development Goal 4 was universally adopted to reduce child mortality by two-thirds between 1990 and 2015. Also, several ‘calls for action’ to reduce neonatal mortality have been made and in response, both governmental and non-governmental institutions have contributed considerable resources to this global health challenge. Similar to other low- and middle-income countries (LMICs), post-adoption of MDG 4 in Ghana observed construction and implementation of maternal and child health policies and intervention programs towards objectifying MDG 4. For example, from 1988 to 1998, the Safe Motherhood Program (SMP), Life Saving Skills (LSS) program, and Integrated Management of Childhood Illness (IMCI) program were initiated. The SMP aims to secure safe delivery for women and improve child health services while the LSS seeks to sharpen the clinical skills of midwives. Similarly, the IMCI targeted to improve child survival through the provision of clinical guidelines for management of childhood illnesses, health system strengthening, and improving community health practices. In the subsequent decade, from 1998 to 2008, some additional intervention programs and policies implemented were the Community-Based Health Planning and Services (CHPS), User Fees Exemption for Delivery (UFED), Focused Antenatal Care (FANC), and National Health Insurance Scheme (NHIS). The CHPS program aimed to bring healthcare closer to the people through primary health care service while the UFED and NHIS programs seek to ease the financial burden of healthcare service and reduce disparity in healthcare uptake. The FANC pursues improvement in maternal and child survival through individualized antenatal care that entails a comprehensive assessment of pregnant women in terms of their socio-cultural beliefs, lifestyle, and medical characteristics to improve early detection and treatment of illness and pregnancy complications. In addition to these national programs and policies, various regions also implemented different intervention programs, for example, the Kybele program in the Greater Accra region, Accelerated Child Survival and Development (ACSD) sponsored by United Nation Children and Education Fund (UNICEF) in the Northern, Upper East, and Upper West regions, and Kangaroo Mother Care (KMC) which commenced in six regions in 2007. Although the deadline for the attainment of MDG 4 has passed, 99% of childhood mortality still occurs in LMICs. Assessment of progress made so far is of utmost importance to inform policy makers and healthcare planners tasked to realize the newly adopted Sustainable Development Goals that seeks to end preventable deaths of newborns and under-five children by 2030.

== Causes ==
Pneumonia has been rated as a prime cause of children under five years mortality in Ghana, with an annual death of 4,300 children and 72,000 cases though it is vaccine preventable. Pneumonia alone causes about 1.58 million deaths annually of children under five, which is more than the deaths caused by HIV/AIDS, malaria and measles put together. According to a World Health Organization report (WHO), Ghana however has made phenomenal progress over the years in immunization coverage, from a national coverage of four per cent in 1985 to 90 per cent in 2012. Other causes are pneumonia preterm birth complications intrapartum-related complications diarrhoea malaria

== Achievements against MDGs ==
As part of the Millennium Development Goals, Ghana has been able to reduce the child mortality in its country, under the following measures:

Growth

Less children aged under five died from preventable causes than ever before. Between 1990 and 2015 the global under-five mortality rate declined from 12.7 million to 6 million deaths a year. Increased coverage of routine immunization, early and accurate diagnosis of childhood illnesses, along with basic and community-based treatment of pneumonia, diarrhoea and malaria, significantly reduced the numbers of deaths of young children, while preventative measures, such as provision of safe drinking water, improvements in sanitation, distribution of insecticide treated nets, vaccination against rotavirus and pneumococcal infection, Vitamin A supplementation, community-based management of acute malnutrition, and improvements in feeding of infants and young children have contributed to survival and healthy growth. Ghana's indicators on child survival was impressive in comparison to other West African countries.

Under-five mortality rate

Ghana excelled in taking action to bring down the under-five mortality rate, and as a result has seen a progressive reduction in deaths from 155 to 60 per 1,000 live births between 1990 and 2014. Though this did not quite reach the MDG 4 target of 40 deaths per 1,000 live births, it represents an overall reduction of under-five mortality of 58% over the period.

Infant mortality rate

The first 28 days, or neonatal period, represent the most vulnerable time for a child's survival. The risk of a child dying before completing the first year of age, was highest in the African region, but has overall decreased in Ghana, where the infant mortality rate dropped from 66 to 41 per 1,000 live births between 1990 and 2014. However, the neonatal mortality rate stagnated over the period, and this has been one of the main reasons for Ghana's inability to achieve the MDG 4 target. At a current rate of 29 per 1,000 live births, neonatal mortality makes up 71% of infant mortality and 48% of under-five mortality.

Proportion of children immunized against measles

Immunization of children against major childhood killer diseases is a key factor in the decline of infant and child mortality in Ghana. The proportion of infants under one-year old vaccinated against measles increased from 50% in 1990 to 89% in 2014.

A number of other interventions and practices also contributed towards the progresses achieved in Ghana between 2009 and 2014:

- 74% of babies were delivered at health facilities;
- 77% of children aged between 12 and 23 months had been given full basic immunization by 12 months of age;
- 47% of children slept under insecticide-treated nets to prevent mosquito bites and thereby malaria;
- 41% of children received treatment with antibiotics for management of pneumonia and 49% of children received oral rehydration salts for acute watery diarrhoea;
- 65% of children aged between 6 and 59 months benefited from a Vitamin A supplementation programme.

=== Motivation of success ===
Political stability, a transparent governance system and universal coverage of primary health care have all contributed to a striking overall reduction in under-five mortality in Ghana. This positive outcome has been achieved through the collective efforts of the Government of Ghana and development partners, the later providing both technical and financial support. The UN system in Ghana has contributed technical assistance in developing policies, strategies and guidelines, and has collaborated with the Government, donors and development partners in implementing them.

As a result of the priority given to child health through these partnerships, as well as through the implementation of the National Child Health Policy, Ghana has been able to:

- scale up the coverage of vaccines, and introduce new ones, to immunize children;
- treat childhood diseases such as malaria, pneumonia and diarrhoea more effectively by applying integrated management within health facilities and communities;
- control deaths from malaria by distributing insecticide-treated nets and effectively treating malaria cases;
- provide Vitamin A supplements for children aged 6– 59 months through biannual campaigns;
- protect and promote breastfeeding and quality infant feeding;
- establish community-based management of acute malnutrition;
- increase provision of safe drinking water and environmental sanitation;

provide free health care to pregnant women and children through the national health insurance services.

=== Transitioning to the SDGs ===
Some of the key challenges Ghana faced in working to meet the MDG 4 target included:

- inadequate national data to provide complete and reliable information on child health
- inadequate skills in the health service at lower levels to improve the quality of care
- high reduction of front-line health workers, especially in the north of the country
- limited numbers of front-line health workers, including midwives
- inadequate resources for immunization and other interventions necessary to improve survival rates
- inequity and disparity in health-care services on the basis of geographical location, wealth and educational background.

While Ghana has made substantial progress in reducing child mortality, more remains to be done to end preventable newborn deaths as part of the efforts under SDG 3 to “ensure healthy lives and promote wellbeing for all at all ages”. To improve child survival further, it will be essential to reduce neonatal mortality. In 2014, with support from the UN system and other development partners, Ghana launched its National Newborn Strategy and Action Plan (2014–18). This sets the goal and expectation of reducing newborn deaths from 32 to 21 per 1,000 live births over the period of the plan. If this is to be achieved, implementation of the strategy must be accelerated. Investment in perinatal care during childbirth and the early postnatal period can yield a triple dividend, with reductions in maternal deaths and stillbirths, as well as in newborn deaths.

Sustained improvements will also require reinvigorated implementation of all interventions to promote the life and health of young children, and urgent action to address the economic and socio-cultural factors that damage their chances of survival.
