= Malnutrition in South Africa =

Malnutrition continues to be a problem in the Republic of South Africa, although it is not as common as in other countries of Sub-Saharan Africa.

15% of South African infants are born with a low birth weight. 5% of South African children are so underweight they are considered to be wasted (a child is considered wasted when they are too thin for their height). Since the 1990s South Africa's malnutrition problem has remained fairly stable. It is estimated that South Africa loses about US$1.1 billion every year in gross domestic product to vitamin and mineral deficiencies arising from malnutrition, although it would only cost an estimated US$55 million to alleviate this problem through micronutrient nutrition interventions.

The prevalence of malnutrition in South Africa varies across different geographical areas and socio-economic groups. Many infants in Africa suffer from malnutrition because their mothers do not breastfeed them. The mothers in South Africa that do not breastfeed their children do not do it mainly to avoid the risk of passing on AIDS. The 2010 South Africa Department of Health Study found that 30.2% of pregnant women in South Africa have AIDS. Malnutrition can cause several different health problems, such as pellagra.

The specific consequences of malnutrition vary depending on the individual and the specific nutrients the individual's diet is lacking. South Africa's Department of Health has established various special programs and initiatives, like the Integrated Nutrition Program, to combat the detrimental effects of malnutrition. All programs and initiatives have faced copious challenges and their individual success rates vastly vary as a result.

== Health effects ==
Malnutrition can lead to an onslaught of additional health complications, and eventually even death. In fact, UNICEF found that 11.4% of deaths of South African children under five can be attributed to low weight, making low birth weight the second most prominent cause of children's death in South Africa. According to 2008 statistics, out of 10 million children's deaths, 5.6 million can somehow be attributed to malnutrition. Although all cases of malnutrition in South Africa will not necessarily lead to death, they will most likely lead to a decline in health. The most easily preventable yet most prominent detrimental health conditions associated with malnutrition are nutrient deficiencies.

=== Vitamin and mineral deficiencies ===
A deficiency in iron levels can lead to anemia, which is a condition classified by decreased hemoglobin levels in the blood. 21.4% of pre-school children have anemia in South Africa. Anemia is also a major cause of maternal mortality. Approximately 50% of pregnant women in South Africa have anemia. Anemia causes tiredness and weakness. If left untreated for long periods of time, it can damage the heart, brain, and other vital organs.

Another common nutritional problem among South Africans is hypocalcemia, a deficiency in calcium. In a study of a randomly chosen rural South African community, 13.2% of children were found to have abnormally low levels of calcium in their blood. Additional studies done on South African children show that this deficiency can lead to Rickets. Rickets causes weakness and pain in bones and dental structures, impaired growth, muscle cramps, and skeletal deformities.

Many South Africans also have a Thiamine (Vitamin B1) deficiency. A serious deficiency in this vital nutrient can cause beriberi, which has the immediate symptom of severe lethargy. If left untreated, Beriberi can cause inflammation of the nervous system and even heart failure. Heart failure associated with beriberi is especially prominent in Johannesburg, the capital of South Africa.

Another disease common to South Africa is pellagra. Dr. D Blumhson, a physician, notes a high rate of pellagra among the patients of a hospital in Soweto, South Africa. Pellagra seems to be especially common in patients with corn-based diets. The disease itself is caused by a niacin deficiency. Pellagra's symptomatology is described by the "4 D's: "dermatitis, diarrhea, dementia, and death". Pellagra causes gastrointestinal discomforts like diarrhea, nausea, vomiting, abdominal pain, and poor appetite. Unfortunately, this downward spiral often causes further malnutrition, which in turn further amplifies the magnitude of pellagra.

An additional malnutrition problem is a deficiency in vitamin A. It is especially prominent in the Northern Province, the KwaZulu/Natal, the Mpumalanga, the North West Province, and the Eastern Cape of South Africa. The South African Vitamin A Consultancy Group (SAVACG) conducted a national survey for the South African Department of Health that showed that one out of three children under the age of six have a Vitamin A deficiency. Vitamin A is necessary for good vision, and a shortage of this substance can lead to visual impairments and potentially even blindness. The World Health Organization showed that half of Vitamin A-deficient blind children die within the year, due to the detrimental effects of Vitamin A on the immune system.

Vitamin C deficiency also has detrimental effects on the South African population. Scurvy, a disease that develops from an extended shortage of Vitamin C, has previously been found prevalent in certain South African mining populations. This disease causes weakness, anemia, skin hemorrhages, and gum disease (gingivitis). Because Vitamin C plays a vital role in the formation of connective tissues, a deficiency in it may also cause complications with the immune system, iron absorption, cholesterol metabolism.

== Causes ==
An individual in South Africa may develop malnutrition because of several factors, not all of them necessarily having to do with diet. According to UNICEF, factors that can cause malnutrition include but are not limited to stress, trauma, poor psychological care, neglect, and abuse.

For example, a woman with psychological problems may not have the cognitive abilities to recognize that she needs to feed her children, and thus may neglect to do so, causing her children not to obtain the sufficient nutrients they need to thrive. However, even mothers with full cognitive abilities may still cause their children to suffer from malnutrition by not partaking in breastfeeding.

=== Breastfeeding and HIV transmission avoidance ===
Breast milk contains many vital nutrients and minerals that protect against infant mortality. Many infants in Africa suffer from malnutrition because their mothers do not breastfeed them. The mothers in South Africa that do not breast feed their children do not do it mainly to try to avoid the possibility that in doing so, their children may contract AIDS. The 2010 South Africa Department of Health Study found that 30.2% of pregnant women in South Africa have AIDs.

Thus, these women pose a huge risk to their infants because infants drinking breast milk infected with the HIV virus may contract the virus as well. Infants with the HIV virus are more likely to pass away if they are breast fed than if they are formula-fed. A study published in the Journal of the International AIDS Society found that the mortality for infected infants was 19% for exclusively breast-fed infants, 13% for mixed-fed infants, and 0% for formula-fed infants.

Thus, many conflicted South African mothers are faced with the morally difficult decision of whether to prevent malnutrition in their children by breastfeeding them at the risk of them contracting HIV, or preventing HIV in their children at the risk of them not being properly nourished. Because the health cost of not breastfeeding a child is not widely known, most South African women chose the latter option and turn to baby formula to replace breast milk as the main nutritional source for their infants. In fact, according to the South African Demographic Health Service, out of all 3-month-old babies in South Africa, only 10% were exclusively breast-fed and 48.3% were bottle-fed.

The formula readily available to the average South African woman does not provide the sufficient nutrients necessary to sustain an infant when utilized by itself. Thus, many infants are not provided with the necessary nutrients they need to thrive, and this can lead to severe cases of malnutrition. The first two years of a person's life constitutes the most vulnerable period for malnutrition, making this lack of nutrients especially detrimental to an infant's health.

However, the problem of malnutrition isn't simply solved by a mother choosing to breastfeed her child. Many infants who are breastfed have mothers who are severely undernourished themselves. If a mother doesn't have sufficient nutrients for herself, she is much less likely to have sufficient nutrients in her breast milk. Thus, breast milk from undernourished women is often lacking sufficient quantities of several vital vitamins and minerals like vitamin B6 and folic acid. This lack of nutrients can lead to a nutritional deficiency in the child being breastfed as well.

=== Additional factors ===
Another main determinant of malnutrition is culture and lifestyle. Various rural South African groups lead agricultural cultivation-based lifestyles that only allow them to live on the very limited amount of resources given to them by their land. The food resources they have access to lack several vital nutrients, making malnutrition among these people more prevalent than among pastoral people and other people with more animal-based diets. In comparison to the average American diet, rural South African groups like the South African Bantu consume a diet with less than half of the fat content.

A lack of fat often accompanies a lack of protein. A lack of protein in a South African's diet can lead to a form of severe malnutrition known as "kwashiorkor." Research was done to compare the frequency of kwashiorkor among five African groups: the Maasai, the Kikuyu, the Batussi, the Bahutu, the Pieraerts, and the Wakamba. The Masai are pastoral people who consume milk and on occasion, meat. The Wakamba, Kikuyu, and Bahutu are non-pastoral agricultural people who cultivate the foods that they eat. The Batussi people are livestock raisers who consume large amounts of curdled milk. The Pieraert people are lake-side dwellers who consume fresh fish and dried fish. The research found no incidences of kwashiorkor among the Masai, Batussi, the Pieraert, and a small part of the Bahutu who in addition to vegetables and grains, also cultivate beans.

However, numerous incidences of kwashiorkor were found among the Wakamba, Kiyuku, and solely grain and vegetable-consuming Bahutu. This shows that South African people who have an agricultural cultivation-based lifestyle are at high risk for malnutrition. In addition to those living in desolate, rural areas, those living in South African slums and other poverty-stricken conditions also only have access to a high-starch, low protein diet. The typical undernourishing South African diet is based on the main staples of rice, porridge, and maize.

=== Poverty ===
Malnutrition is an underlying cause of severe poverty. According to statistics from the year 2000, 50% of the South African population is under the poverty line. South Africa's per capita GDP is $11000 but 21% of people live on a dollar or less a day. In 2008, 27.9% of youth between ages fifteen and twenty-four were unemployed, and the amount of overall unemployment was even higher (33.2%).

The unemployment rate partly stems from South Africa's unstable macroeconomic status that regardless of modern attempts, is yet to be effectively controlled. The nationwide economic instability causes income instability for many Africans, which is reflected in a drop of food and beverage purchases. Statistics have shown the percentage of South African incomes being spent on food and beverage purchases have dropped drastically from 27.4% in the year 2000 to 16.6% in the year 2005. These statistics are reflected in poverty-stricken South African households, where the main food providers have to change their food consumption patterns to cope with economic instability. This is a detrimental change that compromises nutrition.

=== Income inequality ===
According to 2008 statistics, South Africa has the third most unequal economy in the world. The widespread poverty in Africa can be traced to many factors. UNICEF states that the main causes of malnutrition are "household food insecurity, inadequate care for the vulnerable groups such as maternal and childcare, insufficient essential human services including health, education, water and environmental sanitation and housing. According to the effects of South African Apartheid listed in the World Fact Book, Apartheid has helped create many of these issues, especially housing, healthcare, and education. Issues like education (i.e. poor performance in school, poor cognitive development) are directly connected to malnutrition in children.

South Africa is unique from other African countries in its particular experience with Apartheid and colonialism. South Africa has numerous rich natural resources like diamonds and gold. When diamonds and gold were discovered in 1867 and 1886, instead of causing widespread richness for the African people, it caused widespread subjugation to the Boers (Dutch Settlers). Upon their arrival, the Dutch forced black farmers to either abandon their land, become sharecroppers, or become farm laborers. Subjugation from non-native groups continued until South Africa became a Republic. This long period of subjugation eventually lead to the establishment of Apartheid in South Africa in 1948 by the National Party (the ruling political party of the time).

In the 1960s, the Apartheid-centered government created African reserves where blacks could live and have a chance at "separate development." Although the majority of South Africans were (and continue to be) black, the reserves compromised a disproportionally small amount of land (13% of South Africa). The reserves were geographically isolated and had poor healthcare, infrastructure and irrigation. Although the first multiracial election in 1994 brought an immediate end to Apartheid, the detrimental effects of Apartheid in South Africa continue to be felt today.

The poorest South African provinces today are those that encompass former African reserves (Eastern Cape, Limpopo Province, and Kwazulu-Natal). These places are especially known for their higher rates of malnutrition as compared to the already high rates of South Africa. These Black areas also have the highest rates of AIDS in South Africa – 13.6% of black Africans in South Africa are HIV-positive, whereas only 0.3% of whites living in South Africa have the disease.

While 72% of the South African population considered poor live in rural areas, 86.9% of the chronically poor in Kwazulu-Natal live in rural areas. Whereas people in wealthy urban areas tend to have a better nutritional status, rural and agriculturally based people in South Africa tend to have the most inadequate diet.

This is because while wealthy urban residents have access to better education and food, their rural, chronically poor counterparts are less educated, have lower literacy levels, and have limited food access. In 1997, 900,000 households that were located in formal reserves had no arable land access, 1.4 million had no access to any livestock besides chickens, and 770,000 households had access to neither arable land or other livestock. Unfortunately, many of the rural households that did have access to livestock had to sell the livestock in order to alleviate poverty. All this results in a severe shortage of food among the rural poor, thereby leading to a shortage of nutrients.

== Treatment ==
Since the 1990s, the first Millennium Development Goal of the United Nations has been to eradicate world hunger and malnutrition. According to the United Nations, there are certain steps that could be especially beneficial in combating malnutrition. It is estimated that by simply increasing Vitamin A and C intake along with improving breastfeeding methods, the lives of 2.4 million children throughout the world could be saved annually. Various programs in South Africa have been established since then to help achieve this, all with different success rates.

=== Integrated nutrition program ===
In accordance with the goal of the United Nations, the South Africa Department of Health established the Integrated Nutrition Program in 1995. The INP aims to mainly help the people most prevalently at risk for malnutrition: children six years old and under, pregnant women, and lactating women. The main foci of the INP are breastfeeding promotion, growth monitoring and promotion, food fortification, micronutrient supplementation, hospital-based management of severe malnutrition, nutrition rehabilitation in communities, and nutrition management during illness. The INP addresses these foci through nutritional education, nutrition counseling services and support for specific ailments, and indirect provision of healthcare services.

Since the establishment of the INP in 1995, South Africa has adopted the International Code of Marketing of Breast-milk Substitutes to promote breastfeeding. The code was cofounded by the World Health Organization and UNICEF during the thirty-third World Health Assembly. It aims to provide nutrition to malnourished infants through the facilitation of breast-feeding and proper use of breast-feeding substitutes only when absolutely necessary. Unfortunately, there has been a delay in the legislation of the code. If passed, it will need to promote intensive training that follows along the national breastfeeding guidelines for health workers, so that they can reach out to individuals that are doubtful of the benefits of breastfeeding their children. It will also need to promote the extension of maternity leave benefits to give working South African mothers sufficient time and resources to breastfeed.

The INP has implemented growth monitoring in South Africa through the following measures: the provision of growth cards to all caretakers of children under two years old, the constant monitoring of growth and detection of malnutrition, the provision of counsel to caretakers, and the promotion of growth. However, there are various shortcomings in Africa's approach to growth monitoring and promotion. These include inaccurate weight assessment, lack of weight plotting, nurses not trained sufficiently to detect malnutrition, inability to supply growth cards to all infants, and lack of sufficient communication with caretakers.

In order to directly address nutrient deficiencies, the INP established a mandatory food fortification program in 2003, which is interrelated to the micronutrient supplementation program. However, the programs have not reached their anticipated success rates. The food fortification program has created a food fortification mix imbedded in maize meal and other complementary foods. The mix's high Folate content seems to have eradicated Folate deficiencies. The food fortification program also made the iodization of salt mandatory since 1995. This seems to have halted incidences of iodine deficiencies. However, any micronutrients lacking in the food fortification mix can still cause malnutrition. Unfortunately, it has been difficult for the micronutrient supplementation program to provide all the lacking micronutrients to those in need. The program faces various limitations in the forms of supply, supplement quality, bio-availability, outreach, and compliance. For example, the Vitamin A supplementation program has been criticized for its struggles with reaching its most vulnerable target: children and post-partum women. By the year 2050 the world's population is expecting to hit 9.7 billion, as a consequence the poorest countries will still be living 7 years less according to the United Nations. In response to Covid:19 and in order to address these risks, the Food and Agriculture Organization urges countries to:

Meet the immediate food needs of their vulnerable populations, Boost social protection programmes, Keep global food trade going, Keep the domestic supply chain gears moving, and Support smallholder farmers' ability to increase food production. Africa and Asia are at the biggest risks right now more than ever when comes to food insecurity and malnutrition. The 2015/2016 drought that hit Africa has pushed them back since then with the continent making slow recoveries however the drought is still very much present.

The INP has not failed to recognize the challenges that arise in the hospital-based management of severe malnutrition. South African hospitals admit numerous children for severe malnutrition, yet many of these children end up suffering easily avoidable deaths. Even after the 2006 South African amendment of the District Health Information System, which was supposed to provide the case fatality rates of severe malnourishment among children in hospitals, the lack of identification of malnutrition-related deaths remains high. However, there has been a notable drop of malnutrition-related deaths among hospitals due to training and capacity development geared at the hospital staff.

In order to address the problem of nutrient supplementation on a community-wide level, the INP helped establish the short-term program "Nutrition Supplementation Program" (previously known as the PEM Scheme). This program has been fairly effective because of the well-trained nutritionists that assist it. However, various shortcomings remain. The program has struggled with community based interventions and with properly reaching out to and enrolling all malnourished children without misusing resources on children that are not truly malnourished. If the Child Support Grant was extended to apply to all families of malnourished children, all at risk children could be reached and enrolled at hospitals, clinics, and other places that participate in growth monitoring.

Nutrition management during disease is another method used by the INP to prevent malnutrition. South Africa's Department of Health adapted the Integrated Management of Childhood Illness to encourage proper nutrition management. UNICEF, in conjunction with the World Health Organization, established the IMCI to increase child survival in areas with poor resources. IMCI aims to achieve this through a combination of improved management of common childhood diseases and proper nutrition and immunization. However, there are various vague generalities in IMCI's guidelines that make it difficult for South African health providers to know exactly how to train mothers to provide food for their children. This presents a problem because most ill South African children are never seen by a nutritionist so they have no other way of learning how to have a proper nutrition.

== Epidemiology ==
The article Agreement on Defining Malnutrition defines malnutrition as affecting individuals whom "food and nutrient intake is consistently inadequate to meet individual requirements." By the standards of this definition, malnutrition is a prevalent problem in South Africa. In the year 2000, 39% of the country's population suffered from malnutrition. Children are the most affected by this problem, especially young children. South Africa's problem of malnutrition is unique to other countries' malnutrition problems because South Africa is a primarily young country, with one third of the population being under the age of 15.

Thus, the fact that 25% of pre-school children and 20% of primary school children in South Africa suffered from malnutrition in the year 2000 means that the future population of South Africa is being endangered by the problems of malnutrition The problem of malnutrition in South Africa can be individually assessed through the deviation of weight of each child from the average weight for their age. According to the World Health Organization, the deviation from the average weight of children under age five in South Africa has dropped from 31.5% to 8.7% from 1994 to 2008. Malnutrition can also be individually assessed through the deviation of height of each child from the average height for their age. This is because malnutrition stunts growth.

The World Health Organization showed that over the span of thirteen years (1995 to 2008), the deviation from the average height of children under age five in South Africa has slightly decreased from 28.7% to 23.9%. These decreases in deviation show that the problem of malnutrition in South Africa has decreased over recent years. However, it remains a prevalent problem, notably in the regions of Eastern Cape and the Limpopo Province. These two areas are especially poor and rural as compared to the rest of South Africa. According to UNICEF, although 84.5% of South Africans have access to piped water, only 62.4% of Eastern Cape residents have access to piped water.

Also, although only 13.6% of South African households have no toilet facilities, 30% of Eastern Cape residents lack toilet facilities. Similar statistics are true for the rural areas of the Limpopo Province in northern South Africa. The prevalence of malnutrition in Limpopo is so vast that 48% percent of children in the Limpopo Province evaluated in a 2005 study were shown to have stunted growth. Thus, the high levels of poverty and the rural state of these two areas reflect back through high levels of malnutrition.

== See also ==
- Child health and nutrition in Africa
