= Pirira Athumani =

- Born: 1920
- Died: June 2000 (aged 79–80)
- Occupation: Singer

Bibi Pirira Athumani (1920 – June 2000) was a Tanzanian ngoma singer and songwriter.

Pirira Athumani was born in 1920 in a village near the city of Tanga. Athumani was not educated and became literate as an adult.

Her 1950s song "The Stepmother" is based on her experience being raised by and being a stepmother. She argues against traditional Swahili stereotypes, exemplified by the traditional saying "the stepmother is no mother." Her "Love Has No Cure" compares love to juju and warns against attempts to control it, which lead to heartbreak. Her 1990s song "Wape Wape Vidonge Vyao" ('Give Them Their Medicine') was written to warn about the spread of HIV/AIDS in Tanzania. The song discourages sodomy by encouraging the listener to "eat squid, not fish." Culinary metaphors were used as eating was a common euphemism for sexual intercourse.

Pirira Athumani died in June 2000.
