= Healthcare in Tanzania =

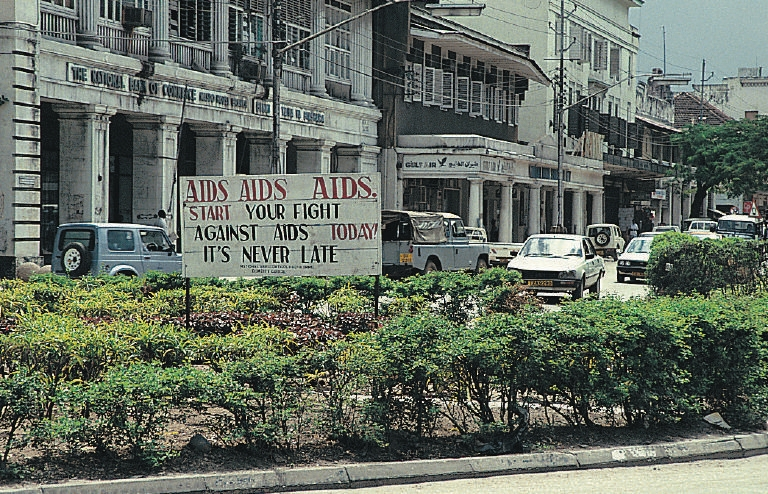
AIDS awareness sign in Dar es Salaam, Tanzania.

Tanzania has a hierarchical health system which is in tandem with the political-administrative hierarchy. At the bottom, there are the dispensaries found in every village where the village leaders have a direct influence on its running. The health centers are found at ward level and the health center in charge is answerable to the ward leaders. At the district, there is a district hospital and at the regional level a regional referral hospital. The tertiary level is usually the zone hospitals and at a national level, there is the national hospital. There are also some specialized hospitals that do not fit directly into this hierarchy and therefore are directly linked to the ministry of health.

The government has several key plans and policies guiding healthcare provision and development. The Health Sector Strategic Plan III (2009–15) is guided by the Vision 2015 and guides planning for health facilities. The Big Results Now (BRN) was copied from the Malaysian Model of Development and placed health as a key national result area and mainly was for priority setting, focused planning and efficient resource use. There are many other policies aiming at improving the health system and health care provision in Tanzania.

The leading causes of mortality in Tanzania include: HIV 17%, lower respiratory infections 11%, malaria 7%, diarrheal diseases 6%, tuberculosis 5%, cancer 5%, ischemic heart disease 3%, stroke 3%, sexually transmitted diseases 3%, and sepsis 2% and this shows the double burden of disease the country has to bear.

== Health care financing ==
Health care financing is among the key component of a functional health system. Financing involves three aspects, namely revenue collection, risk pooling, and purchasing. In recent years, there has been a growing demand for access to high-quality and affordable care for all, thus the government is committed to respond with a process of developing health financing strategy is underway since early 2013. An inter-ministerial steering committee has been developed, composed of key ministries and department to ensure that the proposed reforms meet the needs of the population. Improving the prepayment mechanisms are the main agenda in the development of the strategy, which is assumed to be a potential facilitator in the progress towards UHC.

=== The evolution of health care financing in Tanzania ===
The Arusha Declaration in 1967 was initiated by the president Julius Nyerere, outlining the principles of Ujamaa (Nyerere vision of social and economic policies) to develop the national economy. It marked the start of a series of health sector reforms with the intention of increasing universal access to social services to the poor and those living in marginalized rural areas. Followed by the Government banning private-for-profit medical practice in 1977 and took on the task of providing health services free of charge.

However, by the early 1990s, the strain of providing free health care for all became evident in the face of rising health care costs and a struggling economy. Early 1990s the government adopted health sector reforms that changed the financing system from free services to mixed financing mechanisms including cost sharing policies. Cost sharing in the form of user fees was introduced in four phases: Phase I from July 1993 to June 1994 to referral and some services in regional hospital; Phase II from July 1994 to December 1994 to regional hospital; Phase III from January 1995 onwards to district hospital and Phase IV introduced to health centre and Dispensary after completion of introduction to all district hospital. Exemption and waiver were integral part of the cost sharing policy introduced in 1994.

=== Health spending ===
Current data shows in Tanzania there has been an increase in budget allocation for health over the years: Total Health Expenditure (THE) increased from US$734 million in 2002/2003 to US$1.75 billion in 2009/2010 as indicated in the National Health Accounts 2010 report. However donors have been the main financier of health, despite the decrease in their share of health expenditure from 44 percent in 2005/2006 to 40 percent in 2009/2010. (Table 1). Overall, the government allocation for health spending has remained almost constant at about 7 percent since 2002/2003, far away from reaching the Abuja declaration target of 15% of total government expenditure. The increase in donor funding is attributed to the commencement of financing for HIV and AIDS by the Global Fund in 2001 and the commencement of health financing through Sector wide Approach (SWAp) in early 2000.

Table 1: Financing sources as a % of Total Health Expenditure

	2002/2003	2005/2006	2009/2010
Public	25.4	28.1	26
Private	47.1	27.8	34.5
Donors	27.4	44.1	39.6

On the other hand, there has been a commitment to expand the insurance coverage in the country, however the insurance schemes are highly fragmented. There are four health insurance schemes which are publicly owned, namely National Health Insurance Fund (NHIF), Social Health Insurance Benefit (SHIB) established as a benefit under the National Social Security Fund (NSSF) and the Community Health Fund (CHF) and Tiba Kwa Kadi (TIKA). Recent statistics shows that there were about 7 private firms as indicated in the Tanzania Insurance Regulatory authority (TIRA) which were providing health insurance per se, while a few of other general insurance firms combine health insurance benefit under life insurance.

In 2023, the Universal Health Insurance Act (UHA) was signed into law, mandating that all residents have at least a minimum level of health insurance coverage, from the NHIF or from other approved providers.

=== Health insurance coverage ===
Health insurance coverage is still low in Tanzania. As of 2019, 32% of Tanzanians had health insurance coverage, of which 8% have subscribed to NHIF, 23% are members of Community Health Fund (CHF), and 1% are members of private health insurance companies. Beneficiaries of NHIF includes the contributing members, spouse and up to four dependents. The CHF beneficiaries include head of household, spouse and all children below 18 years. Other prepayment schemes cover less than 1% of the population. CHF mainly focuses its coverage in rural population while private health insurance schemes target urban population. Low insurance coverage leads to over-reliance on direct payment at the point of use of health care, which is among the fundamental problem that restrain the move towards universal health coverage in many developing countries. Direct payment can lead to high level of inequity, and in most cases denying the poorest access to needed health care.

Back in 2001, the Government of the United Republic of Tanzania through the parliament came up with the Community Health Fund Act which after its adoption established the Community Health Fund, CHF. This by far and large was in the efforts towards the attainment of Universal Health Coverage. Having faced difficulties on how to make sure that people have a system in place on healthcare that would provide and cater for their health needs despite their geographical location and proximity to major cities where healthcare could easily be accessed.

The only pressing issue with CHF which it faces to date is low enrollment rate and early drop out in membership and hence a need for a more well-structured system which will be centrally coordinated for efficiency hence the coming of National Health Insurance Fund, NHIF.

It’s a health care system that was designed by the government of the United Republic of Tanzania to help lessen the burden of access to health services on an individual by pooling of resources together and hence risk sharing. It’s a system which started off by enrolling only public servants with monthly deductions directly from their salaries. But further down the lane much progress was achieved, and this was a big milestone in healthcare financing in the country which is pooling together of resources from non-public servants and private individuals into the scheme. Which lead to more benefit packages being crafted to suit their demands in relation to how much they would contribute.

Towards achieving Universal Health Care, a good primary healthcare system is singled out as an entry point into health care system by the majority. In Tanzania a lot of health policies have established a clear objective of attaining primary healthcare for all. There are reforms such as The Health Care Reform of 1994 that focused on improving access, quality and efficiency in health delivery in Tanzania especially after the Structural Adjustment Programs of 1993.

The Medical Stores Department (MSD) which came in place in 1993 and the Prime Vendor Systems (PVS) in 2018 which were aimed at strengthening supply chain of essential medicine in primary health facilities. On top of that in efforts to improve healthcare towards attaining of Universal Health Coverage, the Government recently introduced taxation on the Mobile Money Transfers in which just after four weeks of implementation, a total of TSh48.67 billion was collected and distributed across the country especially in rural areas aiming at healthcare infrastructure development in construction of physical facilities, investment in information systems and medical equipment.

=== National Health Insurance Fund (NHIF) ===
The NHIF was established by the Act of Parliament No. 8 of 1999 and began its operations in June 2001. The scheme was initially intended to cover public servants but recently there have been provisions which allow private membership. The public formal sector employees pay a mandatory contribution of 3% of their monthly salary and the government as an employer matches the same. This scheme covers the principal member, spouse and up to four below 18 years legal dependents. There has been a steady increase in coverage from 2% of the total population in 2001/2002 to 8% in 2019.

A 2024 report by the Controller and Auditor General (CAG) warmed that the National Health Insurance Fund (NHIF) risked collapse if the government did not pay an estimated $80m it owed the fund.

=== Social Health Insurance Benefit (SHIB) ===
Social Health Insurance Benefit (SHIB) is part of the National Social Security Benefits introduced in 2007. All members of NSSF have access to medical care through SHIB after undergoing registration process with only one facility of their choice. The scheme accredits both public and private providers. The benefit is part of their 20% contribution to the NSSF.

=== Community Health Fund (CHF) and Tiba Kwa Kadi (TIKA) ===
Community Health Fund is the scheme that targets the largest population in the rural informal sector and membership is voluntary. There is a counterpart called TIKA which mainly targets the informal sector individuals in urban areas. The CHF and TIKA are both regulated under the CHF act 2001 and managed at district level. At the district level, council health service boards (CHSB) and health facilities governing committees (HFGC) are responsible to oversee the operation of CHF and sensitization. In 2009 the National management role of CHF was given to the NHIF.

=== Private insurance schemes ===
Several private companies, both international and domestic offer private health coverage. These involve both company and individual plans. Strategis was one of the first registered (2002) private health insurance firms in Tanzania, however the space has grown to include companies such as AAR, Jubilee Insurance, Resolution Health and Metropolitan Insurance.

On 25 December 2020, the Minister of Health, Dr. Doroth Gwajima, said hospitals shall inform patients about the medical expenses before the healthcare treatment because they have no legal basis to detain the remains of dead people in order to be paid by their relatives.

== Healthcare Providers ==
There is a significant deficit in doctors providing healthcare in the country, with the ratio of 1.4 doctors per 100,000 falling largely behind the WHO recommendation. Doctors educated both domestically undergo a five-year training program at accredited universities and then a year-long clinical internship, during which graduates practice under supervision and undergo evaluation. They, and those trained internationally, are then licensed by the Medical Council of Tanganyika. To fill the urgent need of service providers, a three-year diploma in clinical medicine leading to certification to practice medicine as a Clinical officer is also offered.

== See also ==
- Health in Tanzania
- HIV/AIDS in Tanzania
- Rabies in Tanzania
- List of hospitals in Tanzania
