= Maternal and child health in Tanzania =

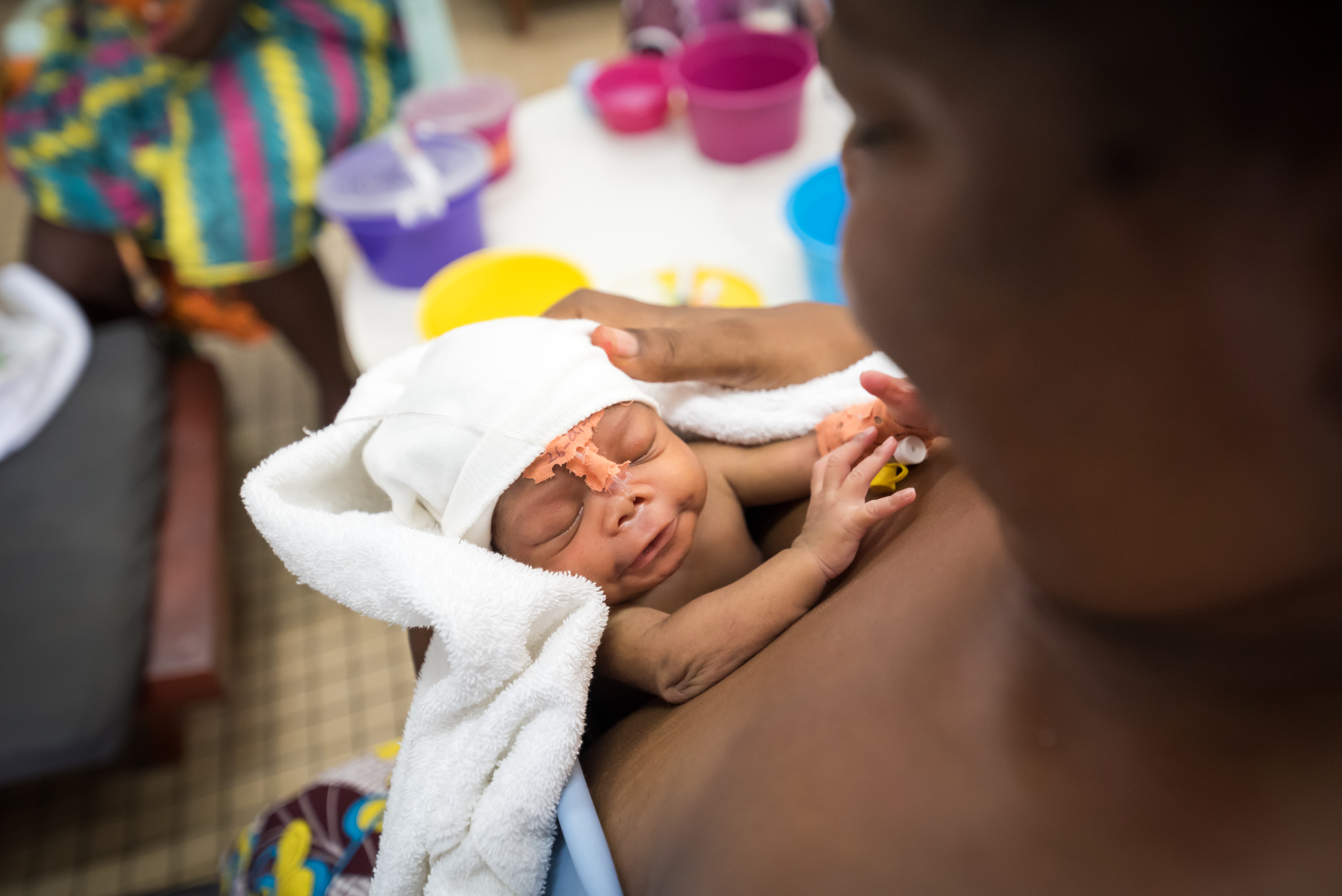
Mother and child health

Both maternal and child health are interdependent and substantially contributing to high burden of mortality worldwide. Every year, 289 000 women die due to complications in pregnancy and childbirth, and 6.6 million children below 5 years of age die of complications in the newborn period and of common childhood diseases. Sub-Saharan Africa (SSA), which includes Tanzania, contributes to a higher proportion of maternal and child mortality. Due to considerable proportion of mortality being attributed by maternal and child health, the United Nations together with other international agencies incorporated the two into Millennium Development Goals (MDGs) 4 and 5. In this regard, Tanzania through the Ministry of Health and Social Welfare (MoHSW) adopted different strategies and efforts to promote safe motherhood and improve child survival. Similarly, in an effort to improve maternal and child health, Tanzania's government has declared maternal and child health services to be exempt from user fees in government facilities.

== Maternal health indicators ==
=== Maternal mortality ratio ===
Complications during pregnancy and childbirth are a leading cause of death and disability among women of reproductive age in developing countries. Statistically, maternal mortality contributes to only 2.3 per cent of the total mortality. The Maternal Mortality Ratio (MMR) represents the risk associated with each pregnancy. MMR is estimated by using both number of maternal deaths and live births. Many low-income countries have no or very little data and modelling is used to obtain a national estimate. According to recent estimates in 2013, total maternal deaths and MMR in Tanzania are 7,900 and 410 per 100,000 live births respectively. The main direct causes of maternal death are haemorrhages, infections, unsafe abortions, hypertensive disorders and obstructed labours. In relation to MDG 5, Tanzania is supposed to reach the MMR of 230 per 100,000 live births by 2015. Although Tanzania reduced MMR from 910 per 100,000 live births in 1990 to a recent data of 410 per 100,000 live births, reaching the MDG 5 target by 2015 seems to be unmanageable. Reduction of maternal deaths is one of the main goals of the Tanzanian Poverty Reduction Strategy and the health sector reform program, but progress has been slow. The slow progress in reducing maternal mortality on Mainland Tanzania is compounded by the impact of the HIV and AIDS epidemic. The fact that nearly half of births in Tanzania occur at home also contributes to the elevated maternal mortality rate.

=== Antenatal care coverage ===
Good care during pregnancy is important for the health of the mother and the development of the unborn baby. Many health problems in pregnant women can be prevented, detected and treated during antenatal care visits with trained health workers. World Health Organization (WHO) recommends a minimum of four Antenatal care (ANC) visit. Tanzania is like other countries in Sub-Saharan Africa (SSA) with high coverage for at least one ANC visit and low coverage in terms of four or more ANC visits. The 2010 Demographic and Health Surveys (DHS) in Tanzania shows 96% and 43% of at least one ANC visit and four or more visits respectively. Some progress have been observed in Tanzania about this indicator and the latest figure are likely to be higher than DHS figures. The only challenges remain to be the required four or more visits together with the quality of ANC services.

=== Skilled birth deliveries ===
This indicator is directly linked to a process of giving birth by pregnant woman, and most of maternal mortality are likely to happen at this stage. Most maternal deaths result from haemorrhage, complications of unsafe abortion, pregnancy-induced hypertension, sepsis and obstructed labour. However, these proportions of causes for maternal deaths are likely to differ from one country to another. According to official estimates, more than 20 women die of pregnancy and childbirth-related complications every day in Tanzania. Ensuring that mothers have access to a skilled attendant during labour can dramatically reduce the risk of death for the mother and newborn child. In the 2010 Tanzania DHS, about 51% of deliveries were assisted by skilled personnel. While it was 41% in 1999 Tanzania DHS. Potentially the current figure national-wide will be more than 51 per cent. Shortage of health providers, among others, are limiting factors to be delivered by skilled provider. The ratio of doctors to patients in Tanzania is 1:25,000 and the ratio of nurses to patients is 1:23,000. While the ratio in the United States is 1:300. President Jakaya Kikwete in May 2014 appealed to health workers in Tanzania to ensure that lives of women and children are not at risk during delivery. In Tanzania, two thirds of women give birth in their own homes, because there are very few health facilities within reach that can provide life-saving emergency services.

=== Postnatal care coverage ===
Every year in Africa, at least 125,000 women and 870,000 newborns die in the first week after birth, yet this is when coverage and programmes are at their lowest along the continuum of care. Since up to 50 per cent of maternal deaths occurs after delivery, a midwife or a trained and supervised Traditional Birth Attendant (TBA) should visit all mothers as soon as possible within the first 24–48 hours after birth. The 2010 figure in utilizing postnatal care in Tanzania was only 31 per cent according to TDHS. Coverage of postnatal check-up within 4 hours after birth varies from 9 percent in the Lake zone to 34 percent in the Southern zone in Tanzania. Postnatal care (PNC) programmes are among the weakest of all reproductive and child health programmes in Tanzania and Sub-Saharan African in general. Given the absence of PNC guidelines in Tanzania, the Reproductive and Child Health Section (RCHS) of the Ministry of Health and Social Welfare [Tanzania] reported in 2009 that is in the process of developing it to be used country-wide.

=== Modern family planning use ===
The policy environment for family planning in Tanzania is mixed, but promising. At the 2012 London Summit on Family Planning, President Kikwete highlighted Tanzania's continued efforts to improve family planning. He mentioned the National Strategy for Growth and Reduction of Poverty (MKUKUTA II) which has a strong family planning component, and the National Family Planning Costed Implementation Plan (2019) which endeavors to reach a contraceptive prevalence target of 47% for married women and 40% for all women by 2023, and a CPR of 60% by 2025. The family planning budget, including contraceptives, will draw from the $117.4 million allocated to all health commodities for the fiscal year 2020–2021. Like many countries in sub-Saharan Africa, Tanzania's once successful family planning program has slowed markedly, with rates of contraceptive prevalence well below levels needed to reach current demand and country goals. In Tanzania, 34.4 percent of married women in 2010 reported use of any method of contraception, while modern methods reached a prevalence of 27.4 per cent. Factors limiting contraceptive prevalence in Tanzania include widespread misconceptions and concerns about side-effects, low acceptance of long–acting methods, erratic supplies and a limited range of choices, gaps in provider knowledge and skills (along with provider bias), competing priorities pursuing scarce resources, limited male involvement, poor communication between spouses, and the perceived value of large families also contribute to low use of family planning methods.

== Child health indicators ==
=== Infant and Under-five mortality rate ===
Both infant and under-five mortality rate assesses the child health status in a particular country. Children in sub-Saharan Africa are about over 16 times more likely to die before the age of five than children in developed regions. Tanzania has reduced the infant mortality rate (IMR) of 101 to 38 per 1000 live births from 1990 to 2012 respectively. Also, it has reduced substantially the under-five mortality rate (U5MR) of 166 to 54 per 1000 live births from 1990 to 2012 respectively. Malaria is the leading cause of death for Tanzanian children and is a major cause of maternal mortality. Tanzania is making considerable progress in the reduction of child mortality. In that respect, Tanzania is likely to achieve MDG 4 of reducing child mortality. The most significant contribution to the reduction of under-five mortality is improved control measures of malaria, Acute Respiratory Infections, diarrhea; improved personal hygiene, environmental sanitation; and preventive, promotive as well as curative health services. Tanzania's average annual rate of reduction of child mortality over the last 15 years was 4.6%, while, the Millennium Development Goal rate set by UN is an annual average rate of reduction of 4.3%; this shows that Tanzania is moving faster! Hans Rosling in 2011 honored Tanzania that is moving faster than MDG rate.

=== Vaccination coverage ===
In the recent past, Tanzania has been in a process of revitalization, with improvements in the planning process, community ownership and involvement, improving coverage, effective mobilization of funds for Expanded Program of Immunisation (EPI), improvements in safety of vaccine delivery and introduction of new and underutilized vaccines. According to 2010 Demographic and Health Survey (DHS) in Tanzania, 66 per cent at 12 months of age were fully immunised during the survey. The 2010 DHS in Tanzania which is the latest, presents the BCG coverage of 95.5%, Diphtheria tetanus toxoid and pertussis (DTP3) coverage of 88%; Polio (Pol3) coverage of 84.9% and Measles coverage of 84.5%. The proportion of children vaccinated against measles increased from 80 per cent in 2005 to 85 per cent in 2010. But the vaccination coverage in Tanzania presented to be more than 90% for each of the above vaccines according to World Health Organization in 2012 gives.

Year	BCG	DTP3	Pol3	Measles
DHS 2010	95.5%	88.0%	84.9%	84.5%
WHO 2012	99.0%	92.0%	90.0%	97.0%

The government of Tanzania via the Minister of Health and Social Welfare, has urged in 2012 that partners and stakeholders in the country to join the National Immunization Coordination Committee to ensure that all children in Tanzanian are covered.

=== Exclusive breastfeeding ===
In Tanzania by 2010, breastfeeding was initiated within the first hour of birth in 46.1% of mothers. Over 97 percent of mothers in Tanzania do breastfeed, however, the prevalence of exclusive breastfeeding in infants aged 0–6 months is 50 percent. Although the national average reported to be 50% prevalence, one regional study focusing on Kilimanjaro region only revealed the general prevalence of 88.1% at one month, 65.5% at three months and 20.7% for an infant of six months of age, which is very low and did not vary between rural and urban. A multivariate analysis using 2010 TDHS data revealed that the risk of delayed initiation of breastfeeding within 1 hour after birth was significantly higher among young mothers aged <24 years, uneducated and employed mothers from rural areas who delivered by caesarean section and those who delivered at home and were assisted by traditional birth attendants or relatives. The risk factors associated with non-exclusive breastfeeding, during the first 6 months, were lack of professional assistance at birth and residence in urban areas.

=== Child malnutrition ===
Malnutrition in Tanzania is a contributing factor in an estimated 130 child deaths every day. According to 2010 TDHS, about 42 percent of children are stunted, 16 percent are underweight and 5 percent are wasted. Different efforts have been adopted in Tanzania to improve children nutrition status. Within a one-year interval from 2010 and 2011, significant reduction in malnutrition observed. In 2011 according to World Health Organization (WHO) estimates on child malnutrition in Tanzania, children aged <5 years stunted was 34.8% in 2011; underweight was 13.6% in 2011; wasted was 6.6% in 2011 and overweight was 5.5% in 2010. Some regions in Tanzania like Iringa, Mbeya and Rukwa are among the five regions with the highest stunting and are all areas with high food production. The case in Tanzania, is inconsistent with the common assumption that increasing agriculture and food production will automatically lead to improvements in nutrition.

Malnutrition remains a big health problem in Tanzania especially for children under five, leading to failure in reaching their full potential. The Big Problem lies in three factors which are low adherence to exclusive breastfeeding, timing of introduction of complementary food and complementary food that are poor in nutrition contents. A lot of literature has highlighted that there is a vivid relationship between persistent malnutrition, poor breastfeeding and complimentary food with low nutrients

1. Poor Breastfeeding

For children to reach their full potential, adequate nutrition is an integral element. The rapid growth especially in the first six months to one year requires a good supply of nutrients. There are worrying cases in LDCs including Tanzania in which exclusive breastfeeding is only practiced in the first two to four postnatal months.

Poor Breastfeeding also stems from the inequality that exists between developed countries and LDCs, there needs to be equal opportunities to enable children to grow and hence contribute to economies, breastfeeding is for lifelong health for individuals and communities

2. Timing of Introduction of Complementary food

Complementary feeding as the names suggests is the introduction of other foods including liquids to help cope up with the growth speed of the child. As a result, with complementary feeding children attain good nutrition status and hence growth and being able to attain their full potential

3. Complementary food that are poor in Nutrition

There is available data that majority of children in Tanzania are born with weight well above the recommended weight of 2.5 kilograms. But unfortunately, growth start to falter during and after introduction of complementary food. This is because most of the complementary food that are available do not meet the quality attributes in terms of energy and micronutrients. The high cost associated with available complementary food and their accessibility also play a major role here

== Partnership to improve maternal and child health ==
Recently, Tanzania has experienced an increase in partnership with different UN organizations, NGOs, the government and health professional communities on improving maternal and child health. The advances in Maternal Newborn and Child Health (MNCH) that have occurred thus far are the result of programmes and initiatives conducted by government in partnership with UN organisations, NGOs, and health professional communities. Some specific examples of action:

- The Tanzania UNICEF country office works in line with the Global Campaign on Children and AIDS to shed spotlight on the impact of HIV/AIDS on children. It also conducts evidence based programmes in the area of malaria, and child survival with a focus on pneumonia, diarrhoea, malnutrition and water and sanitation.
- Another partner, Save the Children in Tanzania, focuses on interventions in education, healthcare and food security. Its strategy is based on close collaboration with the communities.
- Family Care International has launched the Skilled Care Initiative in Tanzania. This programme aims to ensure that high quality skilled care is available to pregnant women. This project is funded by the Bill & Melinda Gates Foundation.
- Engender Health in Tanzania focuses on family planning and Prevention Mother-to-Child transmission (PMTCT). They also respond to needs through counselling and outreach programmes among others. These and other actors are foundation of the partnerships.

== See also ==
- Healthcare in Tanzania
- Ministry of Health and Social Welfare
- Government of Tanzania
- Child health and nutrition in Africa
