= Nutritional challenges of HIV/AIDS =

People living with HIV/AIDS face increased challenges in maintaining proper nutrition. Despite developments in medical treatment, nutrition remains a key component in managing this condition. The challenges that those living with HIV/AIDS face can be the result of the viral infection itself or from the effects of anti-HIV therapy (HAART).

Some of the side effects from HAART that may affect how the body absorbs and utilizes nutrients include fatigue, nausea, and poor appetite. The nutritional needs of people with HIV/AIDS are also greater due to their immune system fighting off opportunistic infections that do not normally cause disease in people with healthy immune systems. Medication along with proper nutrition is a major component of maintaining good health and quality of life for people living with HIV/AIDS.

== HIV/AIDS and nutritional needs ==
=== Energy requirements ===
Monitoring caloric intake is important in ensuring that energy needs are met. For people with HIV/AIDS, energy requirements often increase in order to maintain their regular body weight. A classification system revised by the Centers for Disease Control and Prevention (CDC), categorizes HIV-infection into three clinical stages and addresses the suggested caloric requirements for each stage.

1. Clinical Category A: Asymptomatic HIV
This stage is characterized by Acute HIV. People in this category have estimated needs of 30-35 kcals/kg.
2. Clinical Category B: Symptomatic HIV
This stage is characterized by complications that arise from HIV symptoms. People in this category have estimated needs of 35-40 kcals/kg.
3. Clinical Category C: Presence of AIDS condition
This stage is characterized by having a T-cell count under 200, signaling the presence of an AIDS defining condition and/or an opportunistic infection. People in this category have estimated needs of 40–50 kcals/kg and are at an increased risk of malnourishment.

== Micronutrient requirements ==
=== Multivitamins and supplementation ===
The World Health Organization (WHO) issued consultative recommendations regarding nutrient requirements in HIV/AIDS. A generally healthy diet was promoted. For HIV-infected adults, the WHO recommended micronutrient intake comes from a good diet at RDA levels; higher intake of vitamin A, zinc, and iron can produce adverse effects in HIV positive adults, and these were not recommended unless there is documented deficiency.

Despite the WHO recommendations, recent reviews have highlighted the absence of a simple consensus regarding the effects of multivitamins or micronutrient and nutrient supplementation on HIV positive individuals. This is partly due to a lack of strong scientific evidence.

Some studies have looked into the use of implementing daily multivitamins into the diet regimens of HIV/AIDS patients. One study done in Tanzania involved a trial group with one thousand HIV positive pregnant women. Findings showed that daily multivitamins benefited both the mothers and their babies. After four years, the multivitamins were found to reduce the women's risk of AIDS and death by approximately 30%. Another trial in Thailand revealed that the use of multivitamins led to fewer deaths, but only among people in advanced stages of HIV. However, not all studies have provided a positive correlation. A small trial done in Zambia found no benefits from multivitamins after one month of use.

Regarding individual vitamin and mineral supplementation, research shows mixed results. Vitamin A supplementation has been shown to reduce mortality and morbidity rates among African children with HIV. The WHO recommends vitamin A supplements for all young children 6 to 59 months old that are at high risk of vitamin A deficiency every 4 to 6 months. In contrast, a trial from Tanzania found that the use of vitamin A supplements increased the risk of mother-to-child transmission by 40%. With the inconsistency of these results, scientists have not reached a consensus regarding vitamin A supplementation and its possible benefits for HIV/AIDS patients. Other vitamins to be taken by HIV-infected adults are vitamins C and E.

Evidence for supplementation with selenium is mixed with some tentative evidence of benefit. There is some evidence that vitamin A supplementation in children reduces mortality and improves growth. For nutritionally compromised pregnant and lactating women, a multivitamin supplementation has improved outcomes for both mothers and children.

Thus, further research is required to determine the relationship between supplements and HIV/AIDS in order to develop effective nutritional interventions..

== Effects of HIV/AIDS on nutrition ==
Statistics show that HIV/AIDS is most prevalent in the Sub-Saharan African region. And according to the hunger map of 2010, undernourishment is most prevalent in Asia-Pacific and, once again, in Sub-Saharan Africa. Some of the reasons as to why there is a correlation between malnutrition and the presence of HIV/AIDS are listed below.

=== Food security ===
Food security is present "when all people at all times have access to sufficient, safe, nutritious food to maintain a healthy and active life", as defined by the World Food Summit of 1996. It is set on the basis of food availability, food access, and proper food use. The difficulty for some people with HIV and AIDS involves how they must obtain food security because the virus increases fatigue, compromising their ability to work in order to provide food and food preparation. This impact is even greater on those living in poverty in rural areas, where providing food is largely based on farming and other household chores.

==== Case study in Malawi ====
In Malawi, the AIDS epidemic and its effect on food security for 65 rural households was studied. Findings revealed that illness and death as a result of AIDS compromised household food security. 24 out of 65 households had negative food security indexes, meaning that they did not have enough flour and/or corn to meet their daily caloric requirements. Sharing of food and resources was substantially decreased to those families that were affected with HIV/AIDS, which proved especially detrimental in families that no longer had a prime adult. With the removal of a prime adult, these families were deprived of productive labor resulting in serious production deficiencies. The study concludes that family members victimized by AIDS led to fracturing of interpersonal ties with other families which created food insecurity in a community based on a rural subsistence economy.

=== Malnutrition ===
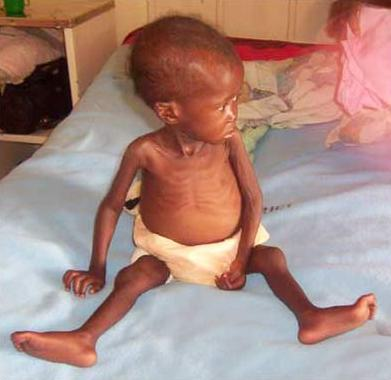
Child suffering from malnutrition

Malnutrition can be used as a measure of food insecurity and it has the most impact on those living in Sub-Saharan Africa and Asia-Pacific, where poverty and malnutrition is most prevalent in the world. It is also in Sub-Saharan Africa where the cases of HIV/AIDS is most prevalent. An individual whose body is already compromised with HIV has an immune system even less effective at defending against infections when the body is malnourished. Anti-retroviral drugs are now being distributed to people in these areas but when given to those who are undernourished, the medicine's effectiveness is decreased and toxicity is increased. Malnutrition accelerates the onset of the disease and give rise to repeated illnesses because of their weakened immune systems. Consequently, HIV and malnutrition provide a cyclic form of feedback for each other, with worsening conditions of malnutrition being linked to a more rapid onset of HIV.

== Food safety ==
For other uses, see food safety

People living with AIDS have impaired immune systems and therefore are more susceptible to infections and diseases due to foodborne pathogens. Food safety includes food handling, food preparation and food storage, all to be dealt with carefully to ensure safety from food-borne bacteria. Those that are more prevalent in people with AIDS include Salmonella, which is the most common cause of illness, being 100 times more prevalent in AIDS patients than healthy individuals. Another example is listeriosis caused by Listeria monocytogenes, with severe and often fatal consequences when encountered by a person with AIDS. Simple measures can be used to increase food safety and prevent food-borne illnesses for those with affected with HIV/AIDS. Washing your hands, the food about to be prepared, kitchen utensils and kitchen surfaces is effective against bacterial growth. Keeping raw meat and cooked meat separate and cooking foods thoroughly, using a food thermometer to be sure. And lastly, storing leftover foods in the refrigerator within two hours to ensure minimal risk of food-borne illnesses.

== Research ==
There are some areas of research that have either not been explored or researched in-depth that are related to the area of HIV/AIDS treatment.

=== Food sustainability and agriculture ===
With food security also having an impact in rural areas affected by HIV/AIDS, another area of research involves agriculture in subsistence economies. More specifically, in these areas where households affected by HIV/AIDS may suffer from food insecurity, focuses for future research may include looking into ways to improve agricultural practices in order to enhance the household food production of families where one or more adults have HIV/AIDS.
