= Rabies in Tanzania =

Viral disease in Tanzania

Rabies takes an economic toll on Tanzania; costs due to rabies include medical expenses, control of infected dogs, and safety inspections in local communities. Rabies medication is also very expensive for the average Tanzanian.

== Context ==
Rabies is a fatal, preventable zoonosis that infects the central nervous system of mammals, caused by the lyssavirus. It is endemic in low income countries, causing an estimated 55,000 human deaths each year with over 98% of these deaths following bites from rabid dogs.

== Socio-economic effects ==
Cleaveland et al. (2002) estimated Tanzanian human rabies mortality at 1499 deaths per year, including unreported cases. There were only 193 reported cases, or 12% of the true number of people dying of rabies annually.

== Prevention schemes ==
There have been some efforts to control rabies through vaccination of the disease sources, which include dogs and other wildlife. A study done in two districts of Ngorongoro and Serengeti studied the spread pattern of rabies where wildlife plays a role in disease transmission. Findings indicated that an annual dog vaccination campaign, achieving the WHO-recommended target of 70% coverage, would have a high chance of controlling rabies in Ngorongoro and Serengeti.
