= HIV/AIDS in Tanzania =

Trends of New HIV/AIDS infections versus HIV/AIDS annual deaths from 1990 to 2015

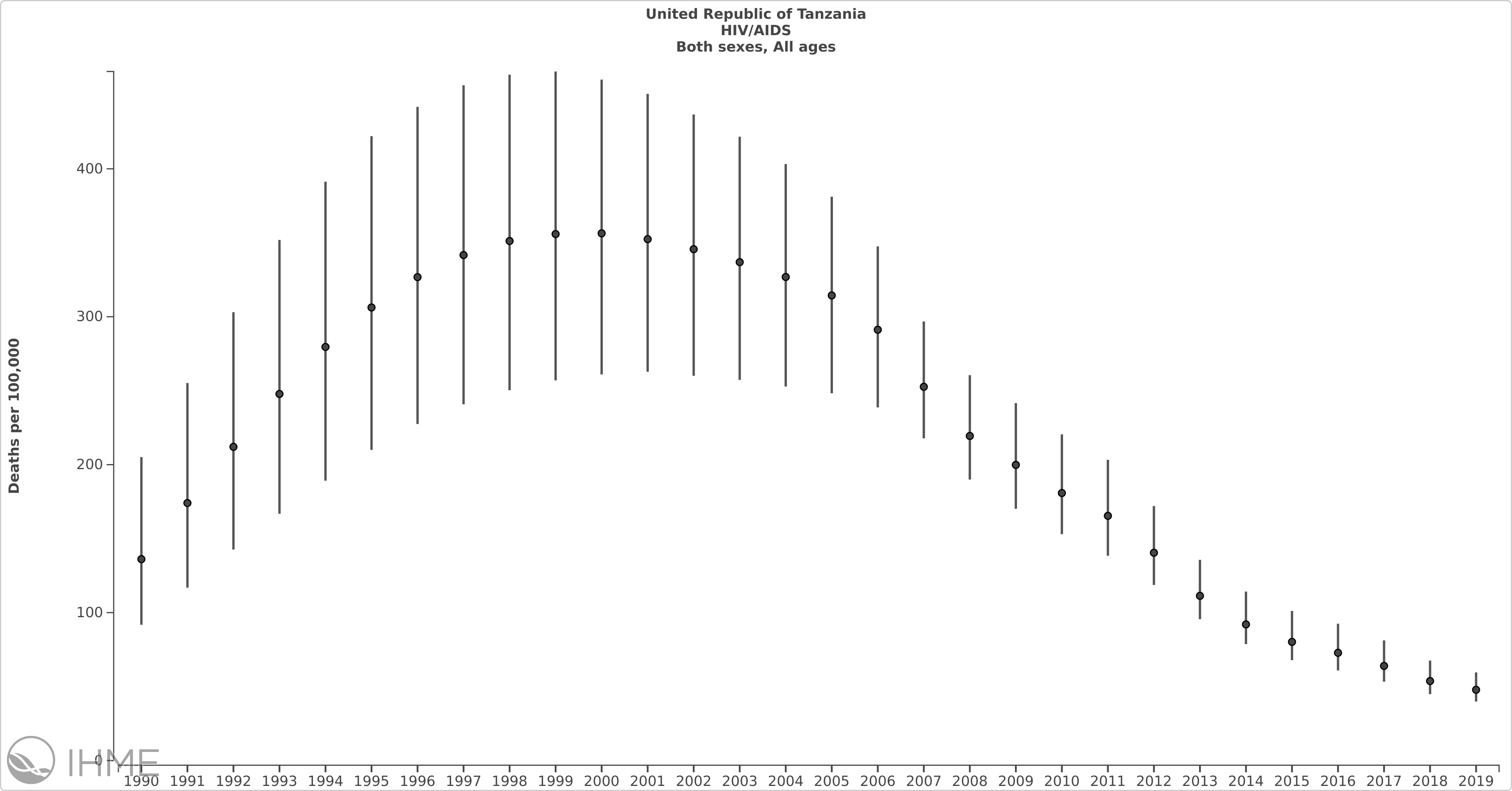
HIV/AIDS trend from 1990 to 2019 in Tanzania

Tanzania faces generalized HIV epidemic which means it affects all sections of the society but also concentrated epidemic among certain population groups. The prevalence of HIV/AIDS in Tanzania is characterised by substantial across age, gender, geographical location and socioeconomic status implying difference in the risk of transmission of infection. In 2019, among 1.7 million people living with HIV/AIDS, the prevalence was 4.6% and 58,000 new HIV infection among 15–49 years old, and 6,500 new infections among children below 15 years old, 50% of all new infections are between 15 and 29 years of age group. Report from Tanzania PHIA of 2016/17 shows that HIV prevalence among women is higher (6.2%) than men (3.1%). The prevalence of HIV is less than 2% among 15–19 years for both males and females and then increases with age for both sexes.

Prevalence of HIV/AIDS has declined from 7% in 2003 to 4.8% in 2018. Burden of HIV/AIDS is higher in urban areas (7.5%) as compared to rural areas (4.5%). The region with the highest prevalence is Njombe estimated to 11.4% followed by Iringa 11.3% and Mbeya (9.3%) while Lindi has the lowest HIV prevalence of less than 1%. In 2019 there were 27,000 HIV/AIDS related deaths. For children below 15 years there were 1,246 deaths and among 15–49 years of age there were up to 18,348 deaths.

== Origins and spread ==
The emergence of AIDS in Tanzania was first documented in the Kagera region in 1983, though researchers suggest that HIV transmission may have begun in the late 1970s or early 1980s. As awareness of the disease grew, reported cases increased significantly. In response to the rising epidemic, the Tanzanian government formally recognized the public health crisis in 1985 and initiated a national task force, which later developed into the National AIDS Technical Advisory Committee.

There is a widespread conception among Tanzanians and among some health workers that the 1979 Uganda–Tanzania War contributed to the spread of AIDS across the country. AIDS was first identified in Tanzania in 1984.

== Progress towards 90-90-90 Target ==
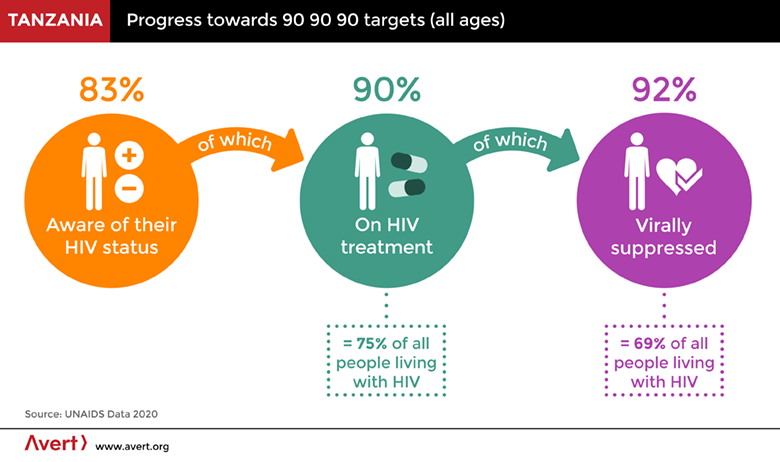
Tanzania progress towards 90-90-90 target

In December 2013, UNAIDS supported regions and countries led efforts to establish new targets for HIV treatment which were to be scaled up beyond 2015 after the deadline of 2011 targets and commitments of Political Declaration of HIV and AIDS. It was agreed by 2020, 90% of all the people living with HIV/AIDS knows their status, 90% of all the people diagnosed with HIV/AIDS receive sustained antiretroviral therapy and 90% of all the people receiving antiretroviral therapy have viral suppression.

By 2019, 83% of all people living with HIV infection know their status of which 90% (75% of all people living with HIV/AIDS) receive antiretroviral therapy and 92%(69% of all people living with HIV/AIDS) have viral suppression.

== HIV testing ==
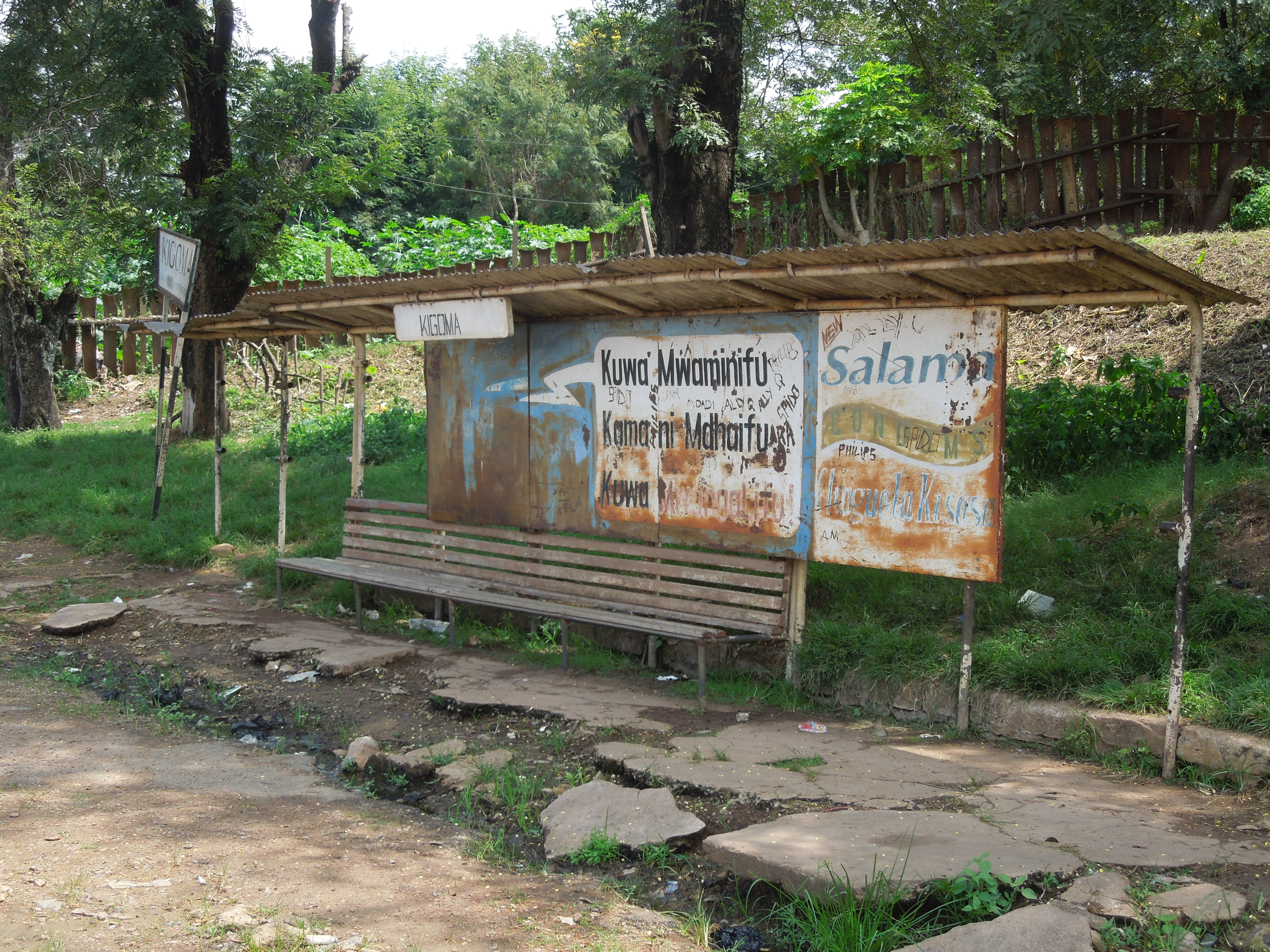
An advertisement at Kigoma rail station saying Be Faithful in the Kiswahili language

The Tanzania Commission for AIDS (TACAIDS) and the Zanzibar AIDS Commission authorized the Tanzania National Bureau of Statistics to conduct the Tanzania HIV/AIDS and Malaria Indicator Survey 2011–12. The survey was conducted in collaboration with the Office of the Chief Government Statistician (Zanzibar) and was funded by the United States Agency for International Development, TACAIDS, and the Tanzania Ministry of Health and Social Welfare. ICF International provided technical assistance during the survey.

The survey covered both mainland Tanzania and Zanzibar. Its objectives were to collect data on knowledge and behaviour regarding HIV/AIDS and measure HIV prevalence among women and men age 15–49. The data was collected 16 December 2011 to 24 May 2012.

=== Results for all those tested ===
The survey tested 9,756 women and 7,989 men in the 15 to 49 age group from every administrative region of Tanzania for HIV infection.

Overall, the survey found that 5.1 percent of those tested were HIV positive. There was no statistically significant difference between this result and the result from the previous survey in 2007–08.

Stratified by gender, 6.2 percent of women were HIV positive, which was significantly higher than the 3.8 percentage rate for men. These results were not statistically different from the results of the previous survey in 2007–08. Njombe region had the highest rate of positive women, 15.4 percent (240 tested), and men, 14.2 percent (200 tested). The rate for men was higher than for women in only two of Tanzania's 30 regions. The rate for both men and women was highest for people in the highest wealth quintile.

The HIV positive rate for uncircumcised men was higher than for circumcised men in every five-year age group except for the 15–19 age group. This was also true when the survey results were stratified by urban versus rural areas instead of by age group.

Among couples living in the same household (married or not), 4.6 were serodiscordant, where one was HIV positive and the other was negative. The Njombe region had the highest rate, 16.2 percent. The only other region above 10 percent was the Dar es Salaam region.

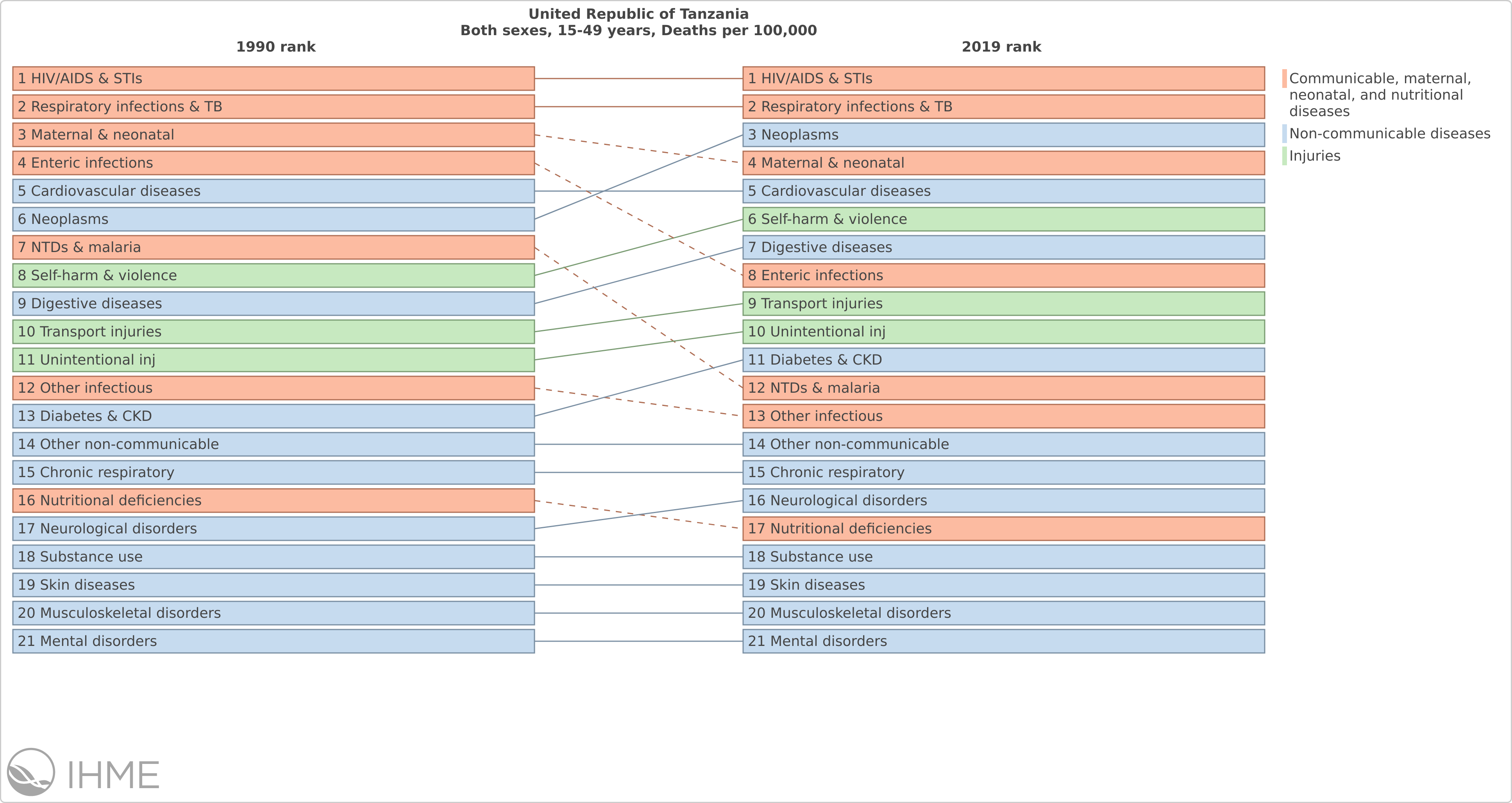
Rank of causes of death for age group 15-49

=== Results for the 15 to 24 age group ===
The survey tested 3,852 women and 3,393 men in this age group from every administrative region of Tanzania for HIV infection. The survey found that 2.7 percent of women were HIV positive, which was significantly higher than the 1.2 percentage rate for men. Njombe region had the highest rate of positive women, 8.6 percent (75 tested), while Kigoma region had the highest rate for men, 3.6 percent (153 tested). The rate for men was higher than for women in only six of Tanzania's 30 regions. The rate for both men and women was highest for people in the highest wealth quintile.

=== Results for the 25 to 49 age group ===
The survey tested 6,072 women and 4,209 men in this age group from every administrative region of Tanzania for HIV infection. The survey found that 7.5 percent of women were HIV positive, which was significantly higher than the 5.2 percentage rate for men. Njombe region had the highest rate of positive women, 18.6 percent (199 tested), and men, 21.4 percent (149 tested). The rate for men was higher than for women in only four of Tanzania's 30 regions.

- In 2016/17 estimated 65% of adults tested for HIV/AIDS among them 59% men while 71% female. As of 2013 there were about 2,100 voluntary counselling and testing sites. Number of people living with HIV/AIDS increased from 64% in 2015 to 84% in 2019.

== HIV prevention program ==
Tanzania is implementing use of combination of preventive services to reduce HIV infection through Fourth Health Sector HIV and AIDS Strategic Plan of 2017/22. Some of the preventive services employed are Prevention of Mother to Child Transmission (PMCT), Condom Promotion, HIV awareness and Sex Education, Voluntary Medical Male Circumcision (VMMC), Cash transfer scheme such as cash plus where money are given to adolescents from poor families to empower and strengthen resilience and wellbeing. Other preventive services include harm reduction by distributing needles for people who inject drugs and use of pre-exposure prophylaxis (PrEP).

== Antiretroviral treatment (ART) ==
In 2018, 1.1million (71%) people living with HIV/AIDS received ART among which 82% were women and 57% men, this is estimated to be 20% increase from 2015. Within the same year 90% of people diagnosed with HIV infection started ART within seven days.

== High risk groups ==
Populations at high risk for HIV infection include sex workers, homosexual men, people who inject drugs, prisoners, people in the transport sector, and the military. 80% of new HIV infections are accounted by heterosexual group and women are the most affected.

== Health sector challenges ==
The greatest challenge facing the health sector is inadequate human resources to deliver quality health services to the Tanzanian population. Since the 1990s, structural adjustment policies and HIV/AIDS have greatly reduced the health-sector workforce. A second challenge is poverty, important because the cost of drugs and health services has constituted a financial barrier to access. Tanzania has formulated its second "Poverty Reduction Strategy" paper to reinforce its commitment to overcoming poverty. Tanzania also continues to struggle with the issue of corruption, with the health care sector being ranked as the second most corrupt sector in the country by the country's Economic and Social Research Foundation. Due in part to the vast size of the country, health services do not currently meet acceptable quality standards, and access to voluntary counseling and testing services varies greatly. Overall, while services may be available, the human and physical infrastructure is in need of improvement to allow for better quality patient care.

== See also ==
- AIDS pandemic
- Circumcision and HIV
- HIV/AIDS in Africa

== Works cited ==
- Francis, Joyce L. (1994). War as a Social Trap: The Case of Tanzania (PhD). American University. OCLC 33488070.
