= Integrated Management of Childhood Illness =

Integrated Management of Childhood Illness (IMCI) is a systematic approach to children's health which focuses on the whole child.This means focusing not only on curative care but also on prevention of disease. The approach was developed by United Nations Children's Fund and the World Health Organization in 1995. It includes both preventive components on the part of families and communities, as well as curative actions to be taken by health workers. It also has an objective to help improve health systems.

== Inequalities of child health ==
Although the annual number of deaths among children less than five years old has decreased by almost a third since the 1970s, this reduction has not been evenly distributed throughout the world. According to the 1999 World Health Report, children in low- to middle-income countries are 10 times more likely to die before reaching age five than children living in the industrialized world. In 1998, more than 50 countries still had childhood mortality rates of over 100 per 1,000 live births.

Every year more than 10 million children in these countries die before they reach their fifth birthday. Seven in 10 of these deaths are due to acute respiratory infections (mostly pneumonia), diarrhea, measles, malaria, or malnutrition – and often to a combination of these conditions

== Rationale for an evidence-based syndromic approach to case management ==
Many well-known prevention and treatment strategies have already proven effective for saving young lives. Childhood vaccinations have successfully reduced deaths due to measles. Oral rehydration therapy has contributed to a major reduction in diarrhea deaths. Effective antibiotics have saved millions of children with pneumonia. Prompt treatment of malaria has allowed more children to recover and lead healthy lives. Even modest improvements in breastfeeding practices have reduced childhood deaths. Many of these interventions have been summed up into 16 key family practices.

While each of these interventions has shown great success, accumulating evidence suggests that a more integrated approach to managing sick children is needed to achieve better outcomes. Child health programmes need to move beyond single diseases to addressing the overall health and well-being of the child. Because many children present with overlapping signs and symptoms of diseases, a single diagnosis can be difficult, and may not be feasible or appropriate. This is especially true for first-level health facilities where examinations involve few instruments, little or no laboratory tests, and no X-ray.

During the mid-1990s, the World Health Organization (WHO), in collaboration with UNICEF and many other agencies, institutions and individuals, responded to this challenge by developing a strategy known as the Integrated Management of Childhood Illness (IMCI). Although the major reason for developing the IMCI strategy was the needs of curative care, the strategy also addresses aspects of nutrition, immunization, and other important elements of disease prevention and health promotion. The objectives of the strategy are to reduce death and the frequency and severity of illness and disability, and to contribute to improved growth and development.

The IMCI clinical guidelines target children less than five years old – the age group that bears the highest burden of deaths from common childhood diseases.

The WHO also published the "Integrated Management of Pregnancy and Childbirth" (IMPAC), which included newborn and neonatal care guidelines as a continuum of care for both the mother and child in postnatal period.
