= Frederika Alexis Cull =

Indonesian-Australian actress and model (born 1999)

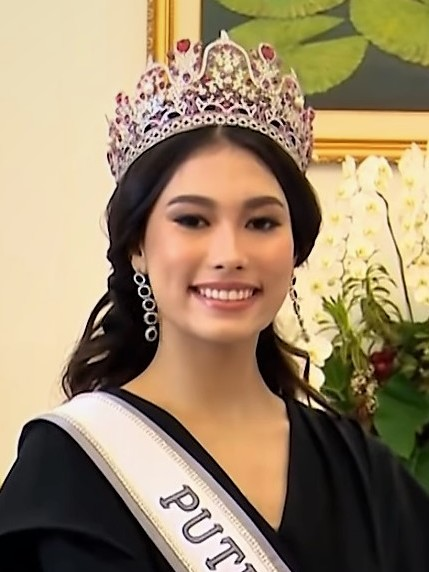
- Cull at the Bogor Palace
- Born: Frederika Alexis Cull; 5 October 1999 (age 27); Jakarta, Indonesia
- Other name: Frederika Cull
- Education: Australian Independent School
- Height: 1.71 m (5 ft 7 1/2 in)
- Beauty pageant titleholder
- Title: Puteri Indonesia 2019; Miss Universe Indonesia 2019
- Hair color: Black
- Eye color: Dark brown
- Major competitions: Puteri Indonesia 2019; (Winner); Miss Universe 2019; (Top 10)

Frederika Alexis Cull (born 5 October 1999) is an Indonesian-Australian actress, model, activist, and beauty pageant titleholder who won the title of Puteri Indonesia 2019. She represented Indonesia at the Miss Universe 2019 pageant, where she placed in the Top 10. She became the seventh Indonesian to place as a finalist in Miss Universe history.

== Early life and education ==
Cull was born in Jakarta, Indonesia, but at the age of 1 until 7 years old she was living in her father hometown, Gold Coast, Queensland, Australia. Cull was born to a British-English born Australian father, Roy Alexis Cull and an Indonesian step-mother, Yuliar Markonah Peers. Frederika moved to Jakarta, Indonesia at the age of seven to pursue her study and modeling career, also she started her foray in acting career at age of 14.

Frederika finish her college study at Australian Independent School Indonesia (AIS Indonesia) in Jakarta, Indonesia. and she took up her bachelor degree Hons. in Economics and Management studies in The Oxford Centre for Management Studies (OCMS) - Saïd Business School of the University of Oxford in Oxford, Oxfordshire, England, and Entrepreneurship Summer Course Program in the same university as well.

== Pageantry ==
=== Puteri Indonesia 2019 ===
Cull started her foray into the world of pageantry when she competed at the 22nd Puteri Indonesia pageant representing Jakarta SCR, she ended up crowned Puteri Indonesia 2019 at the finals held at the Jakarta Convention Center, on 8 March 2019 by the outgoing titleholder of Puteri Indonesia 2018 and Top 20 Miss Universe 2018, Sonia Fergina Citra of Bangka Belitung.

=== Miss Universe 2019 ===
Cull represented Indonesia at the 68th edition of the Miss Universe 2019 pageant on 8 December 2019 at the Tyler Perry Studios in Atlanta, Georgia, where she placed in the top 10. She is the first Indonesian representative to ever place in the top 10. Cull became the seventh Indonesian and the first representative of Jakarta SCR to be placed as a semifinalist in Miss Universe history.

== Filmography ==
Cull has acted in several television films.

=== Television films ===
Year	Title	Genre	Role	Film Production
2013	Buku Harian Dara	drama	as Rika	Trans Media
2021	Layangan Putus	drama	as Miranda	MD Entertainment and We TV
2022	Flora: Turn On	comedy	as Gloria	Screenplay Films and Vidio
2023	Scandal Makers	comedy-drama	as Mikha	MD Entertainment

== Gallery ==
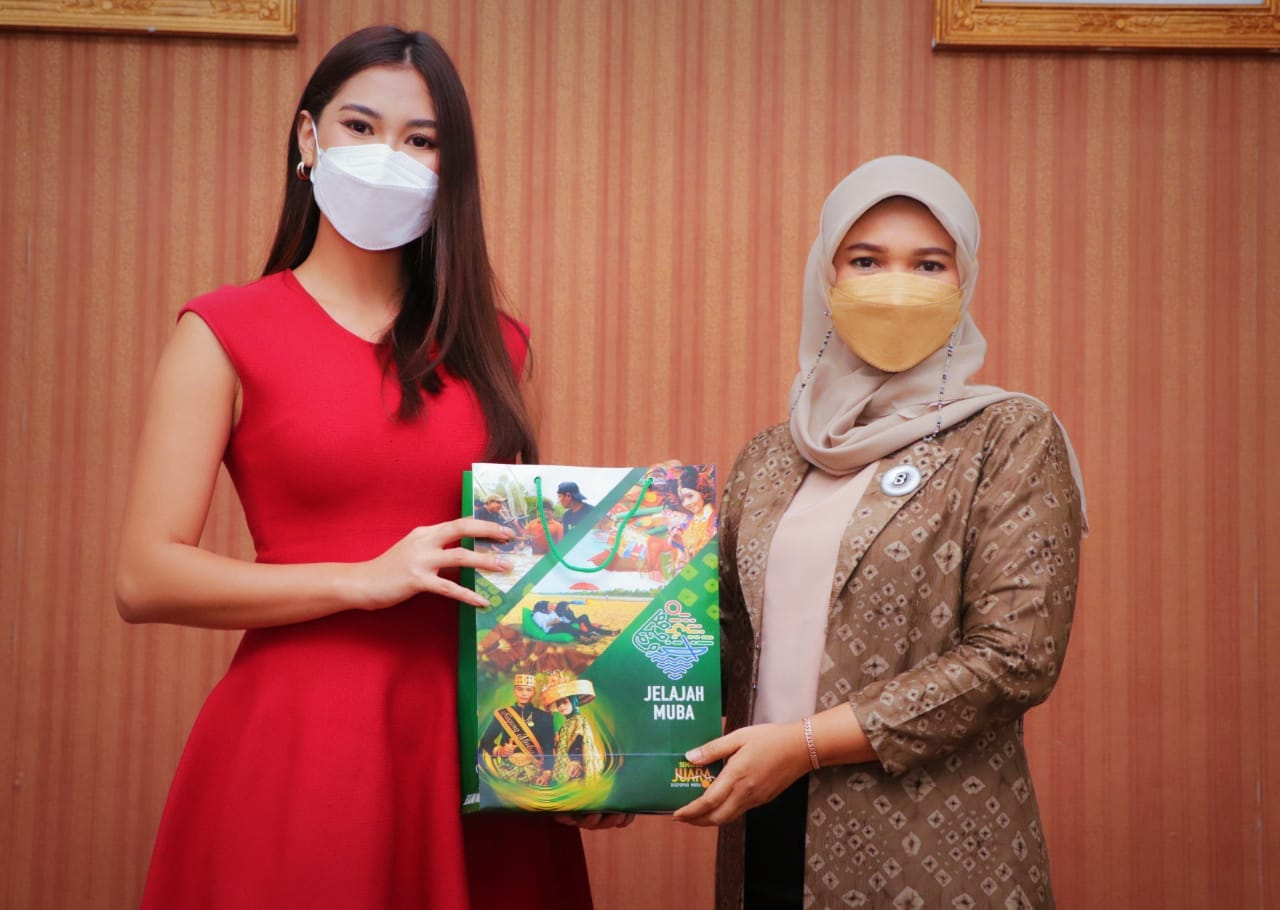
Cull visited Musi Banyuasin Regency in South Sumatra province, to attend the 2021 "Kuyung Kupek Muba" event on October 28, 2021.

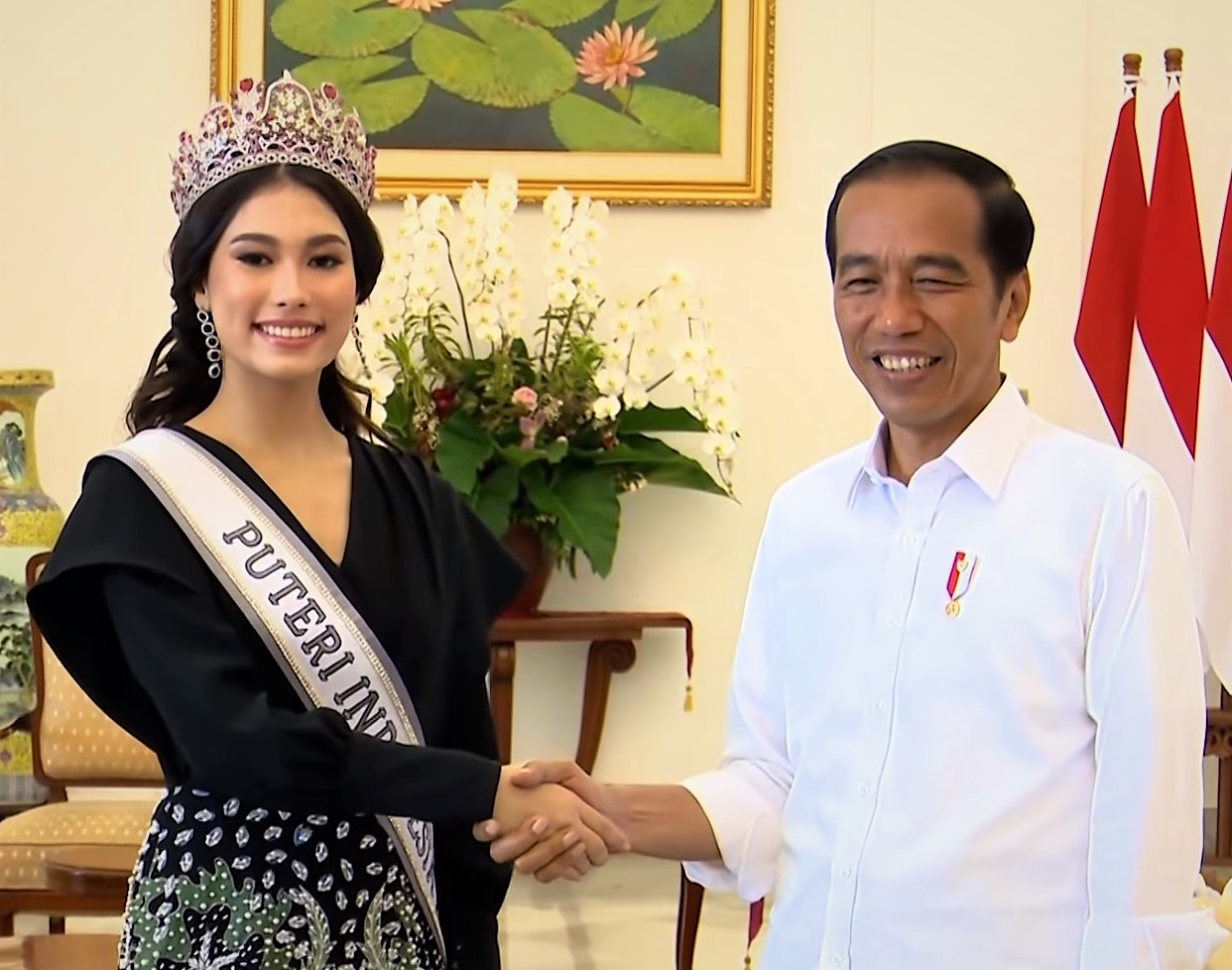
Cull meets with President Joko Widodo in Bogor Palace in 2019

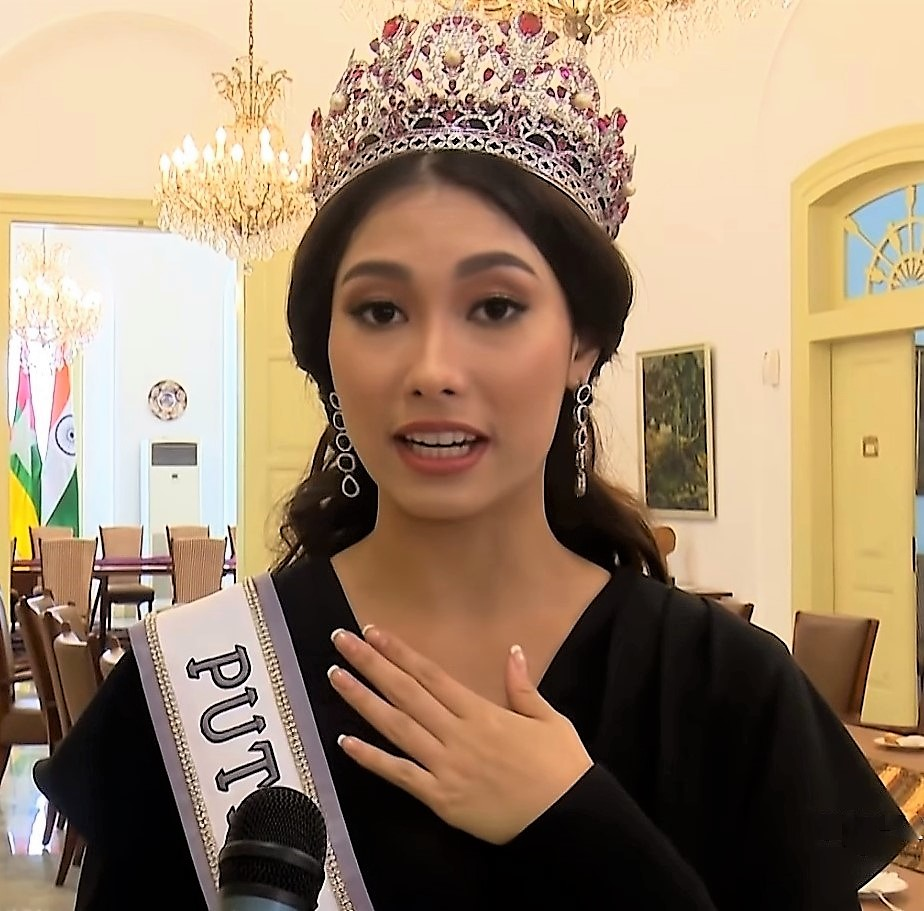
Cull was interviewed by the media while visiting Indonesia's seventh president Joko Widodo at the Bogor Palace

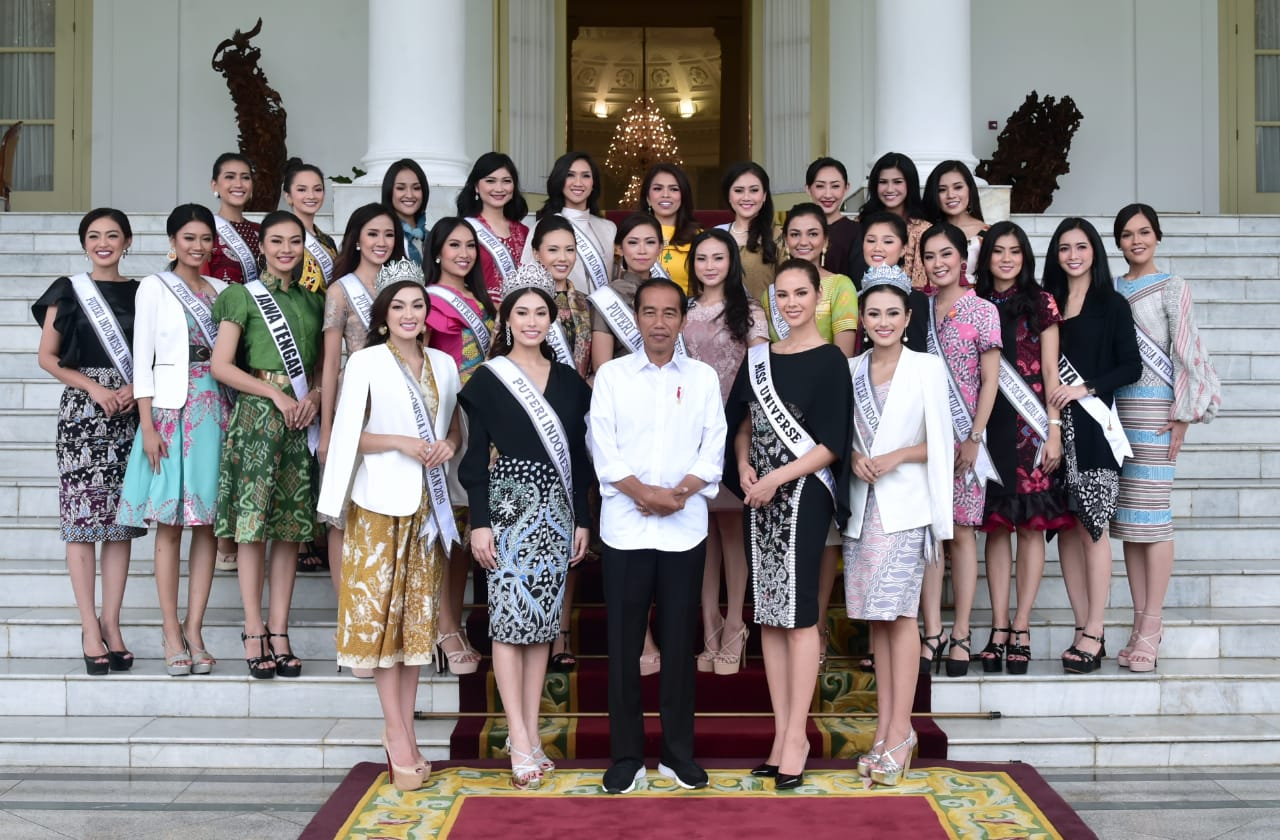
Cull alongside the contestants and winners of Puteri Indonesia 2019, Jolene Marie Cholock-Rotinsulu, Jesica Fitriana Martasari Alfharisi and the Miss Universe 2018, Catriona Gray. Meeting with the President Joko Widodo in Bogor Presidential Palace in 2019

== See also ==
- Puteri Indonesia 2019
- Miss Universe 2019
- Jolene Marie Cholock-Rotinsulu
- Jesica Fitriana Martasari

Awards and achievements
Preceded by Aura Febryannisa	Puteri Jakarta SCR 1; 2019	Succeeded by Stephanie Cecillia Munthe
Preceded by Bangka Belitung – Sonia Fergina Citra	Puteri Indonesia; 2019	Succeeded by East Java – Raden Roro Ayu Maulida Putri
