= Puan Maharani =

Indonesian politician (born 1973)

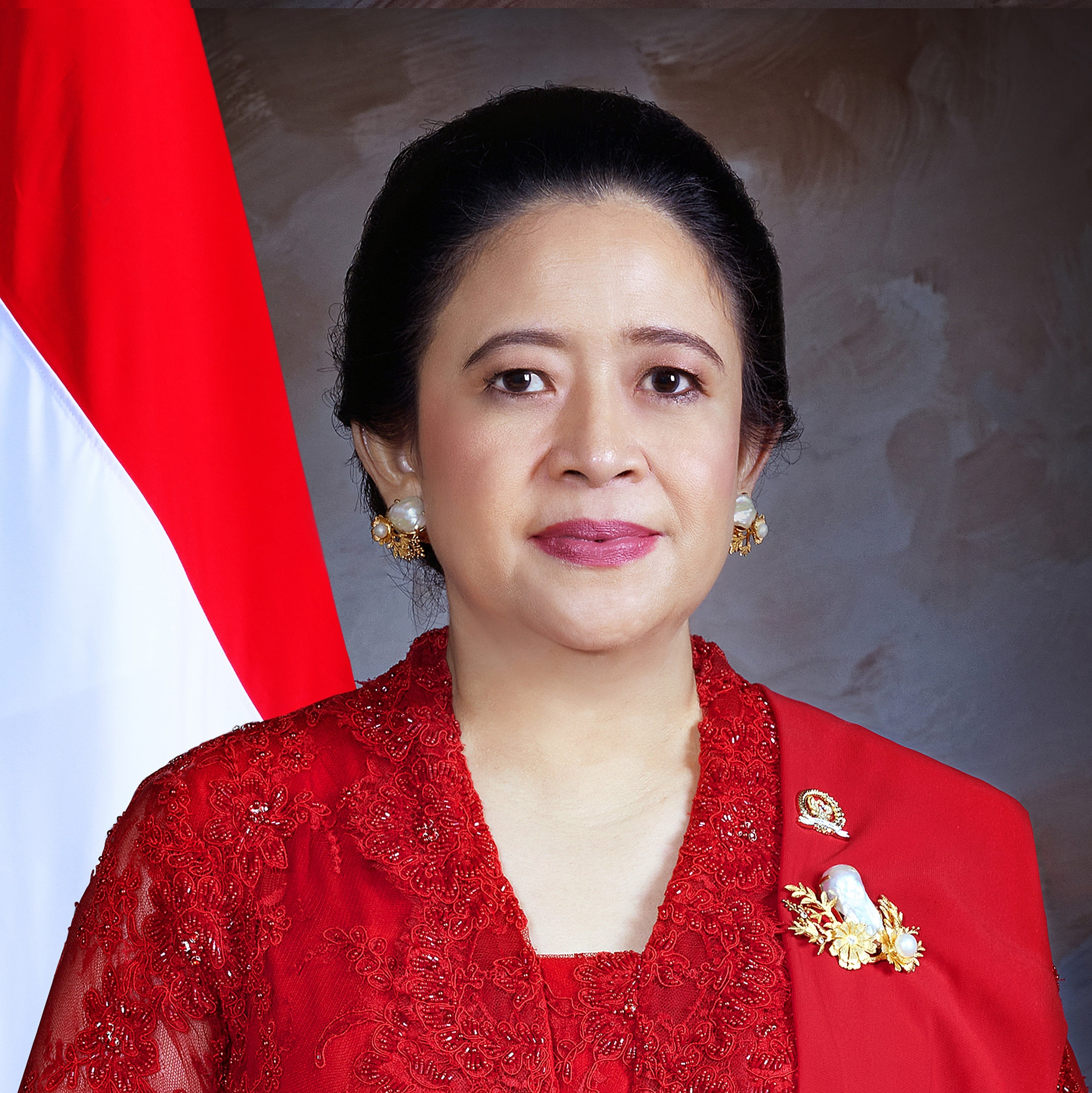
- Official portrait, 2024

19th Speaker of the House of Representatives
- Incumbent
- Assumed office 1 October 2019
- Preceded by: Bambang Soesatyo

17th Coordinating Minister for Human Development and Cultural Affairs
- In office 27 October 2014 – 1 October 2019
- President: Joko Widodo
- Preceded by: Agung Laksono
- Succeeded by: Darmin Nasution (acting); Muhadjir Effendy

Member of the House of Representatives
- Incumbent
- Assumed office 1 October 2019
- Constituency: Central Java V
- Majority: 404,304 (2019); 297,366 (2024)
- In office 2 October 2009 – 26 October 2014
- Constituency: Central Java V
- Majority: 242,504 (2009); 326,927 (2014)

Personal details
- Born: 6 September 1973 (age 53) Jakarta, Indonesia
- Party: PDI-P
- Spouse: Hapsoro Sukmonohadi (m. 1998)
- Children: Pinka Hapsari; Unknown
- Parents: Taufiq Kiemas (father); Megawati Sukarnoputri (mother)
- Relatives: Sukarno (grandfather)
- Education: University of Indonesia
- Nicknames: Ibu Puan; Putri Mahkota PDIP

Puan Maharani Nakshatra Kusyala Devi (born 6 September 1973) is an Indonesian politician serving as the speaker of the House of Representatives since 2019. She is the first woman to serve in the position. A member of the Indonesian Democratic Party of Struggle (PDI-P), she is also a member of the House of Representatives from the electoral district of Central Java V, first serving from 2009 to 2014 and again since 2019. She previously served as coordinating minister for human development and cultural affairs in the Working Cabinet of President Joko Widodo from 2014 to 2019.

Puan is the youngest child, and the only daughter, of former president and current PDI-P leader Megawati Sukarnoputri and politician Taufiq Kiemas, who served as speaker of the People's Consultative Assembly. She is the granddaughter of Indonesia's first president Sukarno.

== Early life and education ==
Puan Maharani Nakshatra Kusyala Devi was born on 6 September 1973. Her mother is former president and current PDI-P leader Megawati Sukarnoputri, the daughter of Indonesia's first president Sukarno. Her father is Taufiq Kiemas, a politician who served as the speaker of the People's Consultative Assembly from 2009 until his death in 2013.

Up until elementary school, Puan lived a relatively normal and uneventful life, despite being the granddaughter of the first president. When she was in junior high school, her mother, Megawati, became active again in Indonesian politics during the New Order.

Puan graduated from high school in 1991, and entered the University of Indonesia in 1991 to study literature. In 1992 she pursued a bachelor's degree in mass communication, earning it in 1997.

== Early political career ==
=== Megawati presidency (2001–2004) ===
After the fall of Suharto in 1998, Puan became involved in politics, as her mother was one of the main players in national politics. During the three-year Megawati presidency, she often accompanied her mother on domestic and foreign visits, in addition to conducting social events by herself.

=== House of Representatives ===
In 2008, Megawati introduced Puan, then head of PDI-P's public and women's empowerment wing, as her successor during campaigning for the 2008 East Java gubernatorial elections in Ngawi. She ran in the 2009 elections in Central Java's election district 5 (covering Surakarta, Sukoharjo, Klaten and Boyolali) and won 242,504 votes - the second highest of all parliamentary candidates in the nation. During her first term, she acted as head of the PDI-P faction, replacing Tjahjo Kumolo. She was assigned to the DPR's 6th commission, covering investment and SMEs. During this period, she argued against a fuel price hike policy in 2013.

=== 2014 presidential election ===
Puan was briefly put up as a possible PDI-P presidential candidate for the 2014 elections and as a possible vice presidential candidate to Joko Widodo (popularly known as Jokowi). In the legislative elections, she won 326,927 votes, again scoring the second-most votes nationwide.

== Coordinating minister ==
Following Jokowi's election victory over Prabowo Subianto in the concurrent presidential election, she was appointed a cabinet minister amid criticism over her inexperience and her mother's political influence. Her replacement in parliament, Alfia Reziani, was only sworn in by 2016. She claimed success during her tenure, pointing at the rising HDI in addition to lower poverty and Gini ratio statistics. She was the only coordinating minister to survive two cabinet reshuffles in Jokowi's first term, prompting the media to describe her as "untouchable".

=== Mental revolution website failure ===
On 24 August 2016, as Coordinating Minister for Human Development and Culture, Puan launched a website, revolusimental.go.id, to promote President Joko Widodo's call for a "mental revolution" in Indonesia. The ministry had received budget funds of Rp149 billion in 2015, resulting in criticism when the revolusimental website went "down" two days after its launch. Officials claimed the site had been hacked and had cost "only" Rp200 million. Reports noted that some of the site's script code had been taken from barackobama.com, a site operated by supporters of Barack Obama. The original site was also built on a theme from open-source website platform WordPress and hosted on a shared server. The website was later redeveloped, but was criticized for being "heavy on budget, light on content". Puan defended the website, saying: “l really want everyone to participate in this programme by joining the activities as well as giving us their opinions or criticisms.”

=== Corruption scandal ===
On 22 March 2018, former House of Representatives speaker Setya Novanto, while on trial for corruption, testified that Puan had received a bribe of $500,000 from businessman Made Oka Masagung in connection with an electronic identity card program when she was a legislator, serving as chairwoman of the PDIP in the House of Representatives. Puan admitted to knowing Made Oka but denied discussing the e-ID case with him. Made Oka, who was jailed for 10 years for his role in the e-ID bribery scandal, denied giving any money to legislators, saying he could not remember a meeting with them. Indonesia Corruption Watch called on the Corruption Eradication Commission (KPK) to check the veracity of the allegation made against Puan. KPK chairman Agus Rahardjo said Setya's testimony was "only talk" and Puan would not be questioned if no evidence had been found.

== House speaker ==
=== Appointment ===
Following Indonesia's April 2019 general election, in which provisional results indicated that the PDIP had received the most votes, Puan was touted to become Speaker of the House for the 2019–2024 period, becoming the first female Speaker of the body. She also indicated she might run for the presidency in 2024. Individually, she obtained 404,034 votes for her ticket to the council, the most of any legislative candidates in the country. She was appointed as Speaker on 1 October 2019, becoming the first woman to hold the position.

=== Tenure ===
During the ratification of Omnibus Law on Job Creation, Puan forcefully turned off the microphone of Benny Kabur Harman, a legislator from the Demokrat party, when he was speaking. Puan claimed that it was her authority to do so, and she was told to do so by Azis Syamsuddin. Puan claimed that Syamsuddin had deemed that Harman had spoken too much and told her to turn Harman's mic off. Puan stated that she did not intentionally turn the mic off, but she turned it off because she wanted the proceeding to continue. Later, the Democratic Party walked out of the ratification.

In 2021, during the confirmation hearing of General Andika Perkasa, Puan ignored interruptions by other lawmakers, closing down the meeting without acknowledging interruption. She also rejected another interruption by the Prosperous Justice Party (PKS) during the ratification of Law on State Capital, claiming that as the majority of parties had already agreed to pass the bill, the party that disagreed with the bill should only be heard after the ratification of the bill.

In 2022, Puan expressed her annoyance when she was not welcomed properly by a provincial governor when she made an official visit to that province, without disclosing the name of the province. She claimed that the governor disrespected her even though she is the Speaker of the House of Representatives, and the governor did not feel proud to be visited by her. It was speculated that Puan was talking about Ganjar Pranowo, as he did not welcome her during her visit to Central Java.

== 2024 presidential election speculation ==
Ahead of the 2024 Indonesian general election, there was speculation as to whether Puan would run for president. Her party, the Indonesian Democratic Party of Struggle, was the only party able to field a candidate without any coalition with another party for the 2024 elections, as the party met the presidential nomination requirement of having more than 20% of the seats in the legislature.

Her possible presidential candidacy was complicated by her poor results in opinion surveys that showed she was not the most popular choice within the party. Polls in the first half of 2022 showed she could only obtain single-digit numbers.

During her April 2022 official visit to inaugurate a clean water facility in Central Java province, she criticized Ganjar Pranowo, the governor of Central Java, who later joined the Indonesian presidential election in 2024. Pranowo, also from PDI-P, always polls higher than Puan. During the event, a participant who called Puan as "presidential candidate" was given a thousand US dollars (IDR 20 million).

Eventually, she ran for another term in the House of Representatives instead, and won a seat from her district with 297,366 votes.

== Personal life ==
Puan is married to businessman Hapsoro 'Happy' Sukmonohadi and has had two children: Diah Pikatan Orissa Putri Hapsari and Praba Diwangkata Craka Putra Soma, both of whom graduated from SOAS University of London.

Puan and Happy held their wedding one month before the start of the reform era. At that time, Puan’s mother Megawati was the country’s leading opposition figure to the regime of President Suharto that did not tolerate critical opposition. Puan said she had difficulty finding a venue for the wedding because many building managers canceled her booking. The wedding was eventually held at Megawati’s house in Kebagusan in South Jakarta. Puan said no state officials were present.

Her husband runs an oil-related distribution business, which Puan was part of before she entered politics.

== Honours ==
- Star of the Republic of Indonesia, 3rd Class (Indonesian: Bintang Republik Indonesia Utama) (25 August 2025)
- Star of Mahaputera, 2nd Class (Indonesian: Bintang Mahaputera Adipradana) (11 November 2020)

== See also ==
- Women in Indonesia

Political offices
Preceded by Bambang Soesatyo	Speaker of the House of Representatives; 2019–present	Incumbent
