= Puteri Indonesia 2019 =

2019 Indonesian beauty pageant

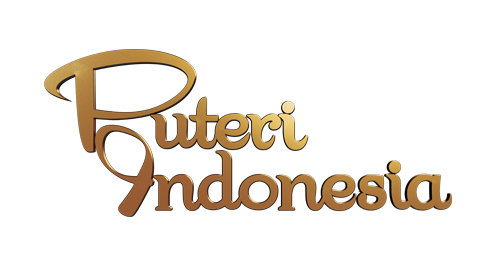
- Puteri Indonesia 2019
- Date: March 8, 2019 (International Women's Day)
- Presenters: Darius Sinathriya; Farhannisa Nasution; Fritz Panjaitan (co-host); Karina Nadila Niab (co-host; Dea Goesti Rizkita (co-host)
- Entertainment: Judika; RAN; Rossa; Andi Rianto; (Magenta Orchestra)
- Theme: Colorful West Nusa Tenggara
- Venue: Jakarta Convention Center, Jakarta, Indonesia
- Broadcaster: SCTV; YouTube; Official Website Puteri Indonesia; Vidio
- Entrants: 39
- Placements: 11
- Winner: Puteri Indonesia Frederika Alexis Cull Jakarta SCR 1; Puteri Indonesia Lingkungan Jolene Marie Rotinsulu North Sulawesi; Puteri Indonesia Pariwisata Jesica Fitriana Martasari West Java
- Congeniality: Diah Ayu Lestari Jakarta SCR 3

Puteri Indonesia 2019, the 23rd Puteri Indonesia pageant, was held on March 8, 2019 (International Women's Day) at Jakarta Convention Center, Jakarta, Indonesia. Sonia Fergina Citra, Puteri Indonesia 2018 of Bangka Belitung, crowned her successor, Frederika Alexis Cull of Jakarta SCR 1, at the end of the event. She represented Indonesia at Miss Universe 2019, where she placed in the Top 10, the highest placement that an Indonesian representative ever achieved.

This edition also witnessed the crowning moment of other titleholders who would represent Indonesia at major international pageants. Jolene Marie Cholock Rotinsulu of North Sulawesi was crowned as Miss International Indonesia 2019 by the reigning Puteri Indonesia Lingkungan 2018, Vania Fitryanti Herlambang. She represented Indonesia at Miss International 2019. Jesica Fitriana Martasari of West Java was crowned as Miss Supranational Indonesia 2019 by the reigning Puteri Indonesia Pariwisata 2018, Wilda Octaviana Situngkir. She represented Indonesia at Miss Supranational 2019.

This year's pageant featured the 'Colorful West Nusa Tenggara' theme, as well as a series of Puteri Indonesia quarantine events being held on the island of Lombok and Sumbawa in West Nusa Tenggara. Contestants from 39 provinces participated this year.

The finale was attended by Miss Universe 2018, Catriona Gray of the Philippines, Miss International 2018, Mariem Velazco of Venezuela, and Miss Supranational 2018, Valeria Vázquez of Puerto Rico.

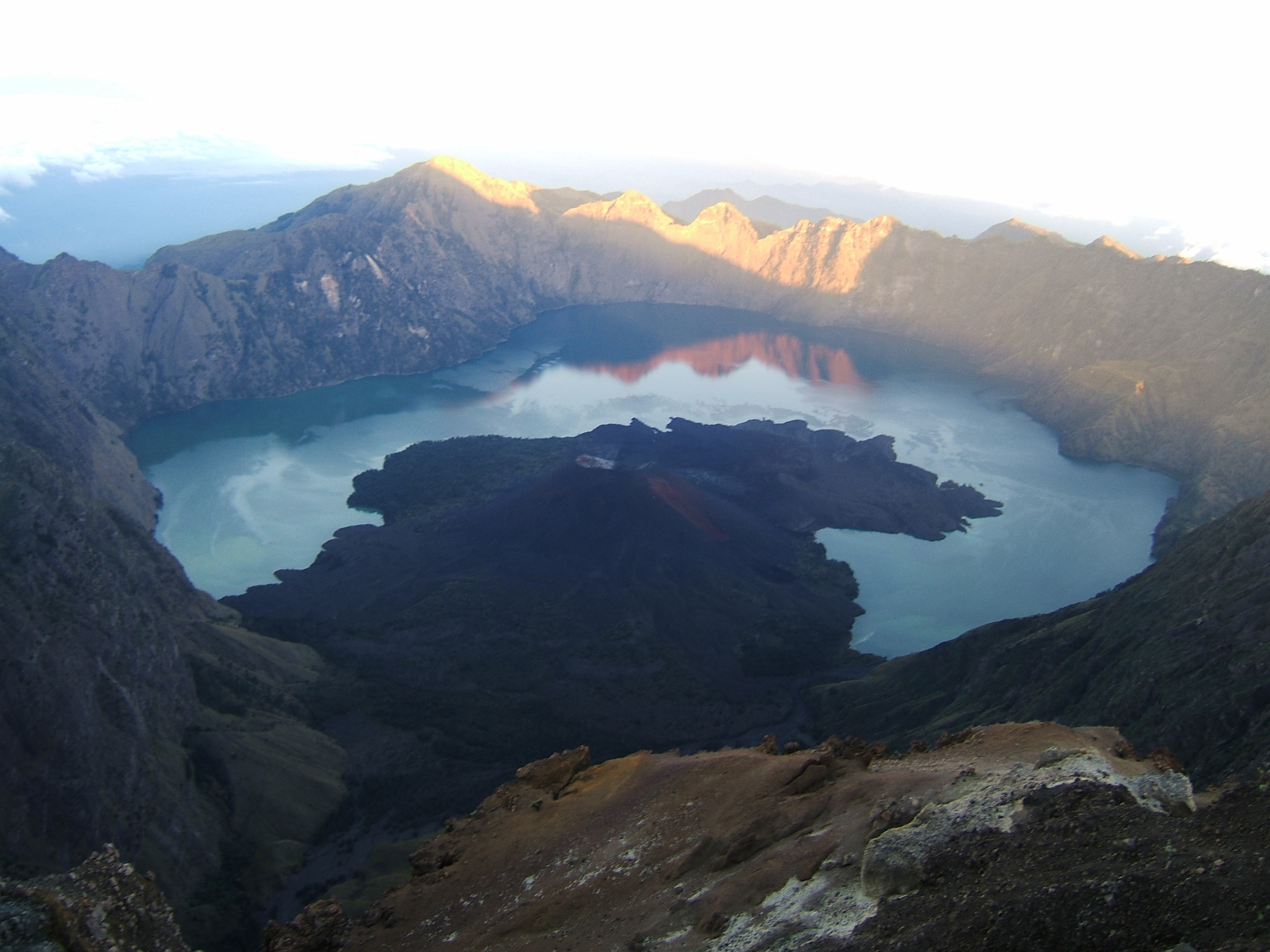
Puteri Indonesia 2019 contestants spent their quarantine days in Lombok, West Nusa Tenggara.

== Judges ==
Following the same appraisal system as Puteri Indonesia 2018, this year there were seven selection committee members, which consist of:

- Kusuma Dewi Sutanto – Jury President, Public Relation Puteri Indonesia Organization
- Mega Angkasa – Jury Secretary, Head of Public relation of Mustika Ratu, public Relation Puteri Indonesia Organization
- Kevin Lilliana – Miss International 2017 and Puteri Indonesia Lingkungan 2017 from Indonesia
- Jenny Kim – Miss Supranational 2017 from Korea
- Bambang Soesatyo – Chairperson of the People's Representative Council of the Republic of Indonesia
- Imam Nahrawi – Minister of Youth and Sports of the Republic of Indonesia
- Triawan Munaf – Chairperson of Department of Creative Economy & Industry of the Republic of Indonesia

== Results ==
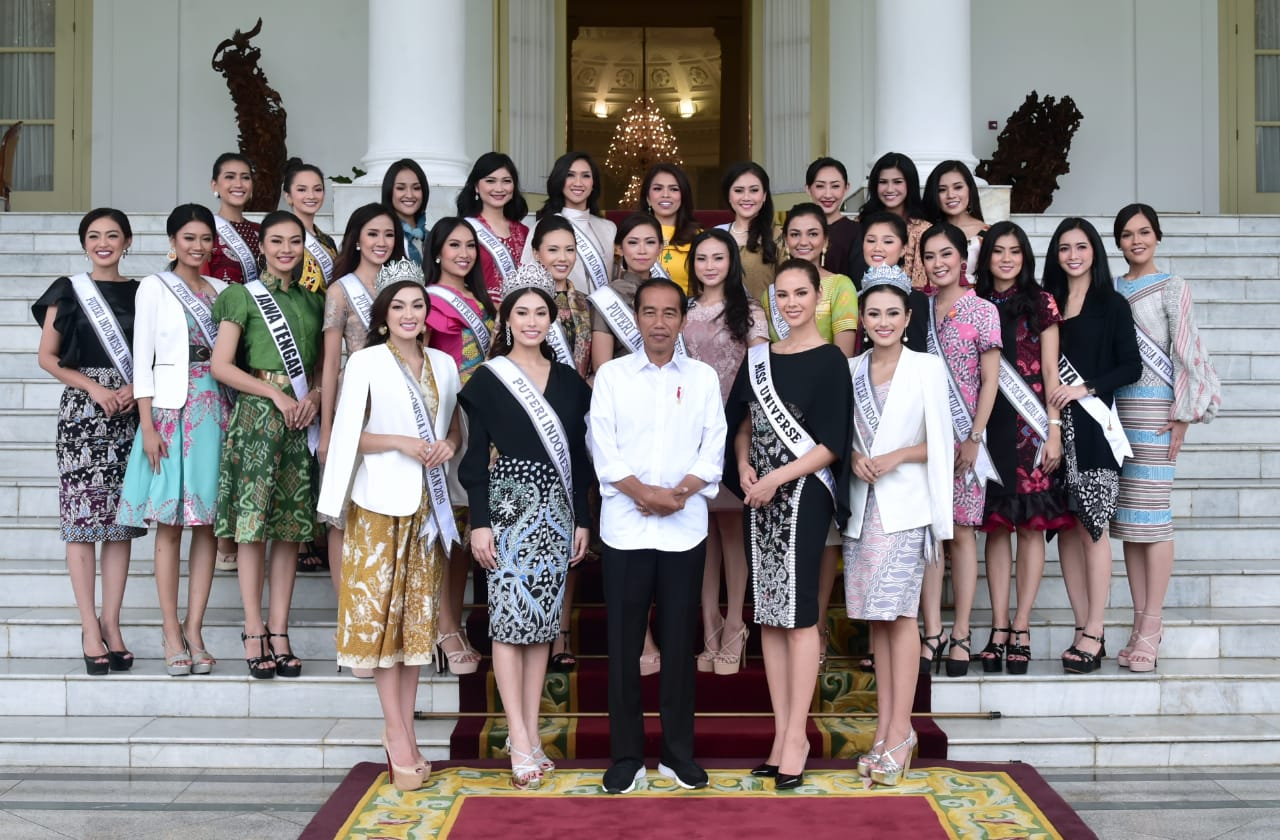
Puteri Indonesia 2019 finalists with President Joko Widodo on steps of Bogor Palace. Front row, left to right: Jolene Marie Rotinsulu, Frederika Cull, Joko Widodo, Miss Universe 2018 Catriona Gray, Jesica Fitriana.

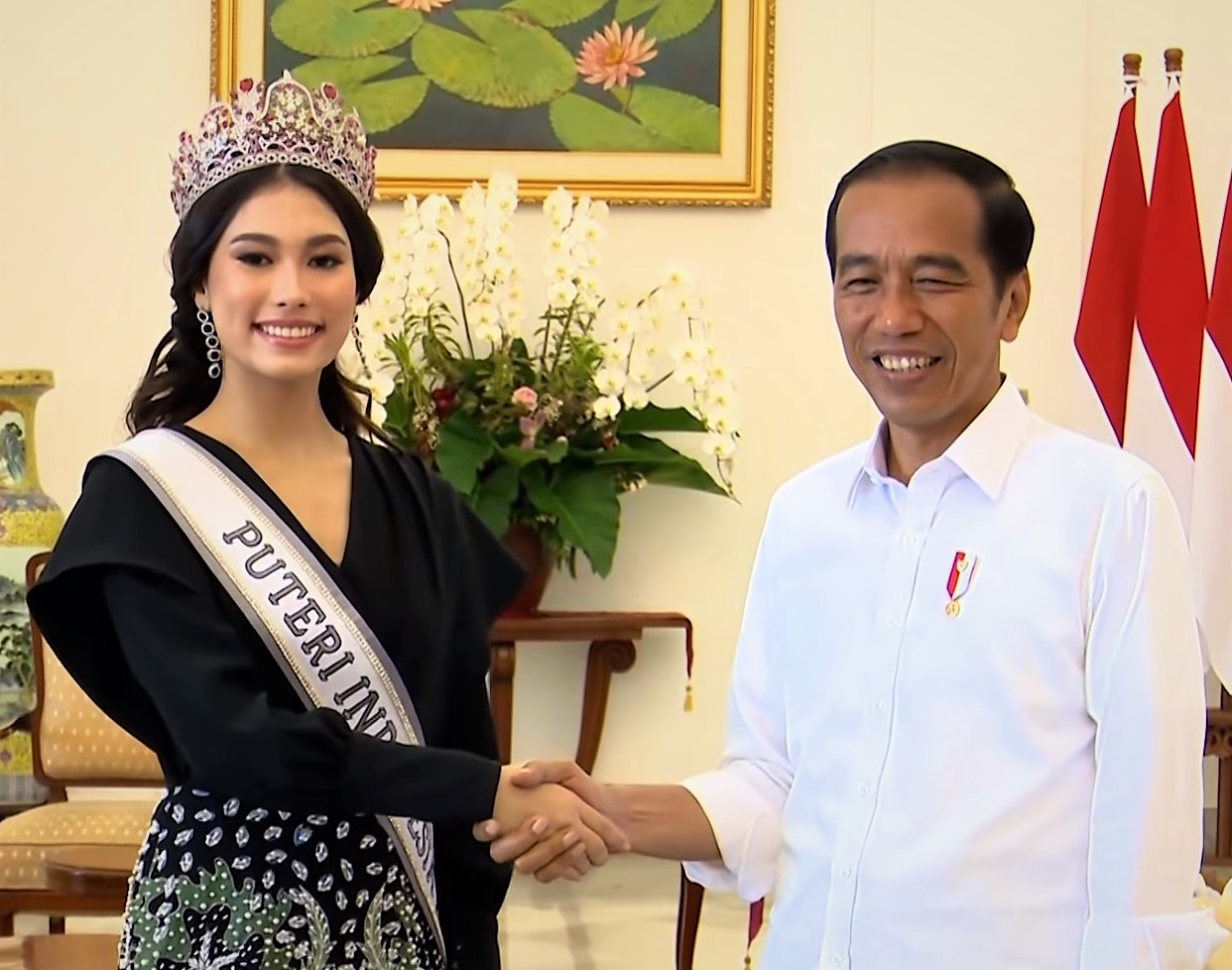
Frederika Alexis Cull meets with President Joko Widodo in Bogor Palace in 2019.

=== Main ===
The Puteri Indonesia 2019 Titleholders

Puteri Indonesia 2019 (Miss Universe Indonesia 2019)
Puteri Indonesia Lingkungan 2019 (Miss International Indonesia 2019)
Puteri Indonesia Pariwisata 2019 (Miss Supranational Indonesia 2019)

| Final Results | Contestant | International Placement |
|---|---|---|
| Puteri Indonesia 2019 (Miss Universe Indonesia) | Jakarta SCR 1 — Frederika Alexis Cull | Top 10 — Miss Universe 2019 |
| Puteri Indonesia Lingkungan 2019 (Miss International Indonesia) | North Sulawesi — Jolene Marie Cholock-Rotinsulu | Top 8 — Miss International 2019 |
| Puteri Indonesia Pariwisata 2019 (Miss Supranational Indonesia) | West Java — Jesica Fitriana Martasari Alfharisi | 2nd Runner-up — Miss Supranational 2019 |
| Top 6 | 3rd Runner-up West Sumatra — Annisa Fitriana; 4th Runner-up South Sumatra — Helvanda Herman; 5th Runner-up East Nusa Tenggara — Maria Hostiana Napitupulu | |
| Top 11 | Jakarta SCR 2 — Agatha Aurelia; North Sumatra — Anoushka Bhuller §; Riau Islands — Lycie Joanna Jon Sen; Southeast Sulawesi — Wa Ode Amelia Nadine; West Kalimantan — Karina Syahna | |

§ Voted into the Top 11 by Social medias and Fan-voting

=== Special Award ===
| Title | Contestant |
|---|---|
| Puteri Indonesia Persahabatan (Miss Congeniality) | (gold) Jakarta SCR 3 — Diah Ayu Lestari |
| Puteri Indonesia Intelegensia (Miss Intelligence) | (gold) East Nusa Tenggara — Maria Hostiana Napitupulu; (gold) Banten — Anastasia Praditha Adelina; (gold) Riau Islands — Lycie Joanna Jon Sen |
| Puteri Indonesia Berbakat (Miss Talent) | (gold) Jakarta SCR 2 — Agatha Aurelia; (silver) Jakarta SCR 1 — Frederika Alexis Cull; (bronze) West Java — Jesica Fitriana Martasari |
| Best Traditional Costume | (gold) South Sumatra — Helvanda Herman; (silver) Riau — Sabrina Woro Anggraini; (bronze) South Kalimantan — Fatmathalia Ranti |
| Best Evening Gown | (gold) Southeast Sulawesi — Wa Ode Amelia Nadine; (silver) East Nusa Tenggara — Maria Hostiana Napitupulu; (bronze) Jambi — Offie Dwi Natalia |

=== Puteri Indonesia Kepulauan ===
Puteri Indonesia Kepulauan is a title for the most Favorite Contestant that was chosen through votes from each group of Islands:

| Title | Contestant |
|---|---|
| Puteri Indonesia Sumatra (Princess of Sumatra) | North Sumatra — Anoushka Bhuller |
| Puteri Indonesia Jawa (Princess of Java) | Jakarta SCR 5 — Daniella Grace Krestianto |
| Puteri Indonesia Nusa-Bali (Princess of Lesser Sunda Islands) | Bali — Nadia Karina Wijaya |
| Puteri Indonesia Kalimantan (Princess of Kalimantan) | South Kalimantan — Fatmathalia Ranti |
| Puteri Indonesia Sulawesi (Princess of Sulawesi) | North Sulawesi — Jolene Marie Cholock Rotinsulu |
| Puteri Indonesia Timur (Princess of Eastern Indonesia) | Maluku — Stela Natalia Mulia Lumalessil |

== Candidates ==
39 delegates competed in the pageant.

| Province | Delegate | Age | Height | Hometown |
|---|---|---|---|---|
SUMATRA
| Aceh | Kenny Suwanda (Note: Aceh: Kenny Suwanda was Duta Wisata Aceh 2017 (1st Runner-up).) | 21 | 1.70 m (5 ft 7 in) | Lhokseumawe |
| North Sumatra | Anoushka Bhuller | 23 | 1.73 m (5 ft 8 in) | Medan |
| West Sumatra | Annisa Fitriana | 23 | 1.73 m (5 ft 8 in) | Bukittinggi |
| Riau | Sabrina Woro Anggraini (Note: Riau: Sabrina Woro Anggraini was Ubon Ratchathani Indonesia representative in Thailand 2015.) | 23 | 1.70 m (5 ft 7 in) | Siak Sri Inderapura |
| Riau Islands | Lycie Joanna Jon Sen (Note: Riau Islands: Lycie Joanna Jon Sen was PSMTI Lampung 2015.) | 22 | 1.70 m (5 ft 7 in) | Batam |
| Jambi | Offie Dwi Natalia | 25 | 1.73 m (5 ft 8 in) | Jambi |
| South Sumatra | Helvanda Herman (Note: South Sumatra: Helvanda Herman was Gadis Pagar Alam 2016 and Putri Sriwijaya 2016 (3rd Runner-up).) | 19 | 1.72 m (5 ft 8 in) | Pagar Alam |
| Bangka Belitung | Ritassya Wellgreat Waynands (Note: Bangka Belitung Islands: Ritassya Wellgreat Weigmann was Putri MIA 2018, Best personality BEA 2018 and Winter Fashion 2018 (2nd Runner-up).) | 17 | 1.74 m (5 ft 9 in) | Pangkal Pinang |
| Bengkulu | Nabila Permata Putri | 23 | 1.70 m (5 ft 7 in) | Bengkulu |
| Lampung | Erika Dwi Alviana (Note: Lampung: Erika Dwi Alviana was Muli 1 Provinsi Lampung 2018 and Muli 1 Kabupaten Tulang Bawang Barat 2018.) | 22 | 1.70 m (5 ft 7 in) | Panaragan |
JAKARTA SCR
| Jakarta SCR 1 | Frederika Alexis Cull (Note: Jakarta SCR 3: Frederika Alexis Cull was an aspirator for the organization that save and protect abandoned animals, and strives to stop the sale of dog meat as consumption. She also work in local NGO called "Sekolah Bisa & Cyber Shantu" that provides education in various subjects and technologies to prepare underprivileged children entering public schools. These children doesn't have birth certificates that make them not have an official identity as a citizens of Indonesia. To overcome this, she collaborated with the local government to arrange their birth certificates.) | 19 | 1.70 m (5 ft 7 in) | Jakarta |
| Jakarta SCR 2 | Agatha Aurelia | 22 | 1.72 m (5 ft 8 in) | Jakarta |
| Jakarta SCR 3 | Diah Ayu Lestari (Note: Jakarta SCR 3: Diah Ayu Lestari was an Indonesian Singer, Winner of AMI Award for the best "Karya Produksi Lagu Berbahasa Daerah Terbaik".) | 21 | 1.73 m (5 ft 8 in) | Jakarta |
| Jakarta SCR 4 | Nurmalasari Ghassani (Note: Jakarta SCR 4: Nurmalasari Ghassani was the Winner of Bekasi Fashion Week 2017 where she get the title of "Best in Catwalk" and the Supermodel Indonesia 2017 (finished as a contestant).) | 23 | 1.70 m (5 ft 7 in) | Jakarta |
| Jakarta SCR 5 | Daniella Grace Krestianto (Note: Jakarta SCR 5: Daniella Grace Krestianto was Miss Asia Awards - Indonesia 2018 (representing Bandung, Indonesia).) | 23 | 1.72 m (5 ft 8 in) | Jakarta |
| Jakarta SCR 6 | Sri Hartini Puspitasari | 25 | 1.76 m (5 ft 9 in) | Jakarta |
JAVA
| Banten | Anastasia Praditha Adelina (Note: Banten: Anastasia Praditha Adelina was Winner Panasonic Gobel Award 2018 and Top 15 Miss World Indonesia 2012.) | 25 | 1.70 m (5 ft 7 in) | Tangerang |
| West Java | Jesica Fitriana Martasari (Note: West Java: Jesica Fitriana Martasari was Puteri Jawa Barat 2018 (1st Runner-up) when Tria Devitasari won the Puteri Jawa Barat in 2018 and went to Puteri Indonesia 2018.) | 23 | 1.71 m (5 ft 7 in) | Bogor |
| Central Java | Pratiwi Hidayasari (Note: Central Java: Pratiwi Hidayasari was Duta Pemuda Indonesia Jawa Tengah 2018, Jamboree Pemuda Indonesia Provinsi Jawa Tengah 2018, Denok Kendal 2017, Top 3 Puteri Jawa Tengah 2016, Duta Wisata Jawa Tengah 2017 and Mbak Kendal 2014.) | 22 | 1.71 m (5 ft 7 in) | Kendal |
| SR Yogyakarta | Anja Litani Ariella (Note: Special Region of Yogyakarta: Anja Litani Ariella was Miss World Indonesia 2017 (4th Runner-up).) | 23 | 1.72 m (5 ft 8 in) | Yogyakarta |
| East Java | Bella Putri Ekasandra (Note: East Java: Bella Putri Ekasandra was Winner Model Search Surabaya 2017.) | 19 | 1.78 m (5 ft 10 in) | Malang |
LESSER SUNDA ISLANDS
| Bali | Nadia Karina Wijaya | 24 | 1.70 m (5 ft 7 in) | Denpasar |
| West Nusa Tenggara | Sherly Anastesia Meilenia | 19 | 1.70 m (5 ft 7 in) | Bima |
| East Nusa Tenggara | Maria Hostiana Napitupulu | 23 | 1.78 m (5 ft 10 in) | Kupang |
KALIMANTAN
| West Kalimantan | Karina Syahna (Note: West Kalimantan: Karina Syahna was None Jakarta 2017 and Miss LSPR 2016.) | 24 | 1.70 m (5 ft 7 in) | Pontianak |
| South Kalimantan | Fatmathalia Ranti (Note: South Kalimantan: Fatmathalia Ranti was Aiesec Exchange Participant in Turkey 2018, Duta Anti Narkoba Banjarmasin 2016, Paskibraka Nasional 2015 and Indonesian Youth Ambassador Malaysia 2015.) | 19 | 1.70 m (5 ft 7 in) | Banjarmasin |
| Central Kalimantan | Veronika Peny Laba | 25 | 1.73 m (5 ft 8 in) | Palangka Raya |
| East Kalimantan | Radha Virsa Febiola Darmawan | 22 | 1.70 m (5 ft 7 in) | Samarinda |
| North Kalimantan | Adani Ladita Ramadhani | 20 | 1.69 m (5 ft 7 in) | Tarakan |
SULAWESI
| South Sulawesi | Ratu Fatimah Gani (Note: South Sulawesi: Ratu Fatimah was Wajah Femina 2016 (2nd Runner-up).) | 24 | 1.71 m (5 ft 7 in) | Maros |
| West Sulawesi | Mutmainnah Iin | 24 | 1.72 m (5 ft 8 in) | Mamuju |
| Southeast Sulawesi | Wa Ode Amelia Nadine (Note: Southeast Sulawesi: Wa Ode Amelia Nadine was Miss TSM 2013.) | 22 | 1.76 m (5 ft 9 in) | Muna |
| Central Sulawesi | Riski Savina Akbar | 24 | 1.72 m (5 ft 8 in) | Palu |
| North Sulawesi | Jolene Marie Cholock Rotinsulu (Note: North Sulawesi: Jolene Marie Cholock Rotinsulu was an Indonesian mountain climber, Official Para Games Organizing Committee (INAPGOC) for 2018 Asian Para Games and many other International Paralympics Games, work as an ambassador for local NGO such as "Rumah Karya Sahabat" a school that provide free education for the homeless and street children and "Du’Anyam" a forum for empowering mothers to increase financial income by raising the culture of "Weaving", helped disabled elderly people with the movement of "1001 wheelchairs" and other physical disability support equipment. She's also the 1st Runner-up and Miss Photogenic at Miss Celebrity Indonesia 2010.) | 22 | 1.73 m (5 ft 8 in) | Manado |
| Gorontalo | Artika Fastinal Rustam (Note: Gorontalo: Artika Fastinal Rustam was Putri Bahari 2014 (2nd Runner-up).) | 23 | 1.70 m (5 ft 7 in) | Gorontalo |
EASTERN INDONESIA
| Maluku | Stela Natalia Mulia Lumalessil (Note: Maluku: Stela Natalia Mulia Lumalessil was Miss Asia Awards Indonesia 2017, Mojang Jawa Barat 2015 and Mpok Bekasi 2014.) | 25 | 1.77 m (5 ft 10 in) | Saparua |
| North Maluku | Irena Shafira | 19 | 1.70 m (5 ft 7 in) | Ternate |
| West Papua | Etha Lanny Julieth Wekan (Note: West Papua: Etha Lanny Julieth Wekan was Model Hunt 2015 and Atrium Model 2013.) | 19 | 1.70 m (5 ft 7 in) | Manokwari |
| Papua | Elsa Irwanti Elisabeth Kaize (Note: Papua: Elsa Irwanti Elisabeth Kaize was Puteri Papua 2011 (2nd Runner-up)) | 25 | 1.70 m (5 ft 7 in) | Biak |

== Crossovers Notes ==
Contestants who previously competed in other local beauty pageants or in international beauty pageants and reality modeling competition:
