= Jolene Marie Rotinsulu =

Indonesian beauty pageant winner

Jolene Marie Cholock-Rotinsulu
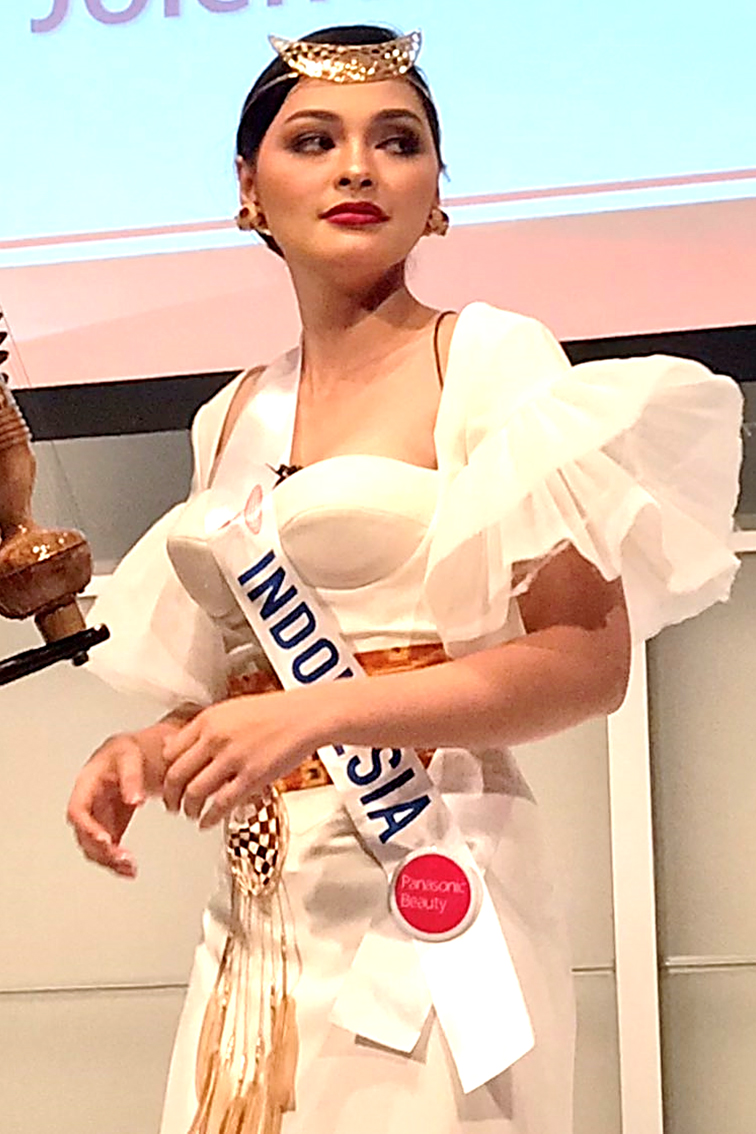
- Rotinsulu during Miss International 2019 fund-raising charity event for Tokyo 2020 Summer Paralympics Games for Disability Athletes.
- Born: Jolene Marie Cholock-Rotinsulu; May 15, 1996 (age 30); Santa Ana, California, U.S.
- Education: Sekolah Tinggi Teologi Abdi Gusti Nganjuk
- Occupations: Actress; TV commercial model; singer; beauty pageant titleholder
- Height: 1.74 m (5 ft 8 1/2 in)
- Beauty pageant titleholder
- Title: Puteri Indonesia Lingkungan 2019; Miss International Indonesia 2019
- Years active: 2007–present
- Hair color: Brown
- Eye color: Brown
- Major competitions: Puteri Indonesia 2019; (1st Runner-up – Puteri Indonesia Lingkungan); Miss International 2019; (Top 8)

Signature
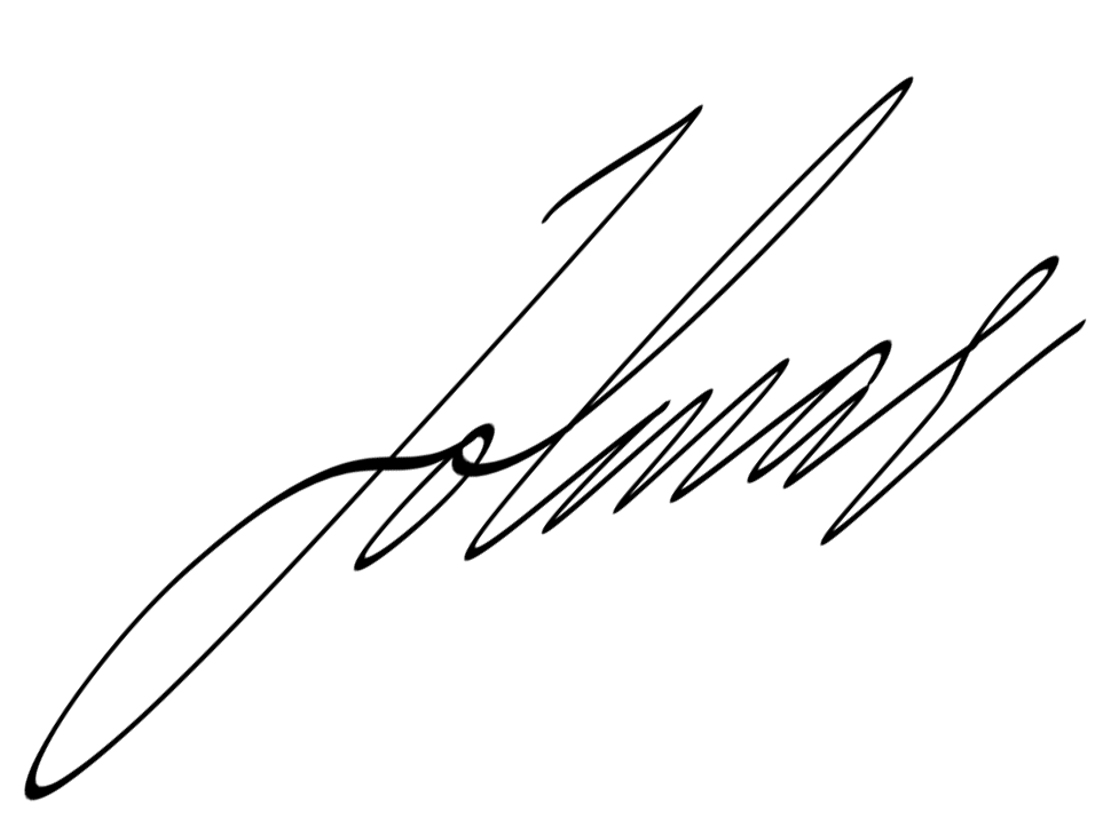

Jolene Marie Cholock-Rotinsulu (Indonesian: [rotinˈsulu]; born May 15, 1996) is an Indonesian-American beauty pageant titleholder and disability rights activist who won the title of Puteri Indonesia Lingkungan 2019. She represented Indonesia at the Miss International 2019 pageant at the Tokyo Dome City Hall in Tokyo, Japan where she finished as Top 8, continuing the ongoing 4th year placement streaks of Indonesia.

== Early life, education and career ==
Rotinsulu worked as an official committee in 2018 Asian Para Games and received a Satyalancana Kebhaktian Sosial ("Social Welfare Medal") from the president Joko Widodo.

Rotinsulu was born in Santa Ana, California to a Minahasan born father, Roy Guustaf Rotinsulu from Talaud, North Sulawesi, and an American mother, Allery Lee Cholock, from Los Angeles, California. Sirena Elizabeth Cholock-Rotinsulu, her older sister, was the past winner of Miss Celebrity Indonesia 2011. Rotinsulu holds a bachelor degree from Sekolah Tinggi Teologi Abdi Gusti Nganjuk

Rotinsulu has been a commercial model from age 10. She appeared on several music videos as a model and co-singer. She began her career as an actress by starring on the movie I AM HOPE (2016); a movie dedicated to cancer survivors. In addition, she obtained a certificate in outdoor recreation and an Indonesian national equestrian athlete for dressage disciplines in International Federation for Equestrian Sports.

In 2017, Rotinsulu is an official member of the Asian Paralympic Committee for preparing 2018 Asian Para Games. She is known for receiving a Satyalancana Kebhaktian Sosial ("Social Welfare Medal") from the President of the Republic of Indonesia, Joko Widodo.

== Activist background ==
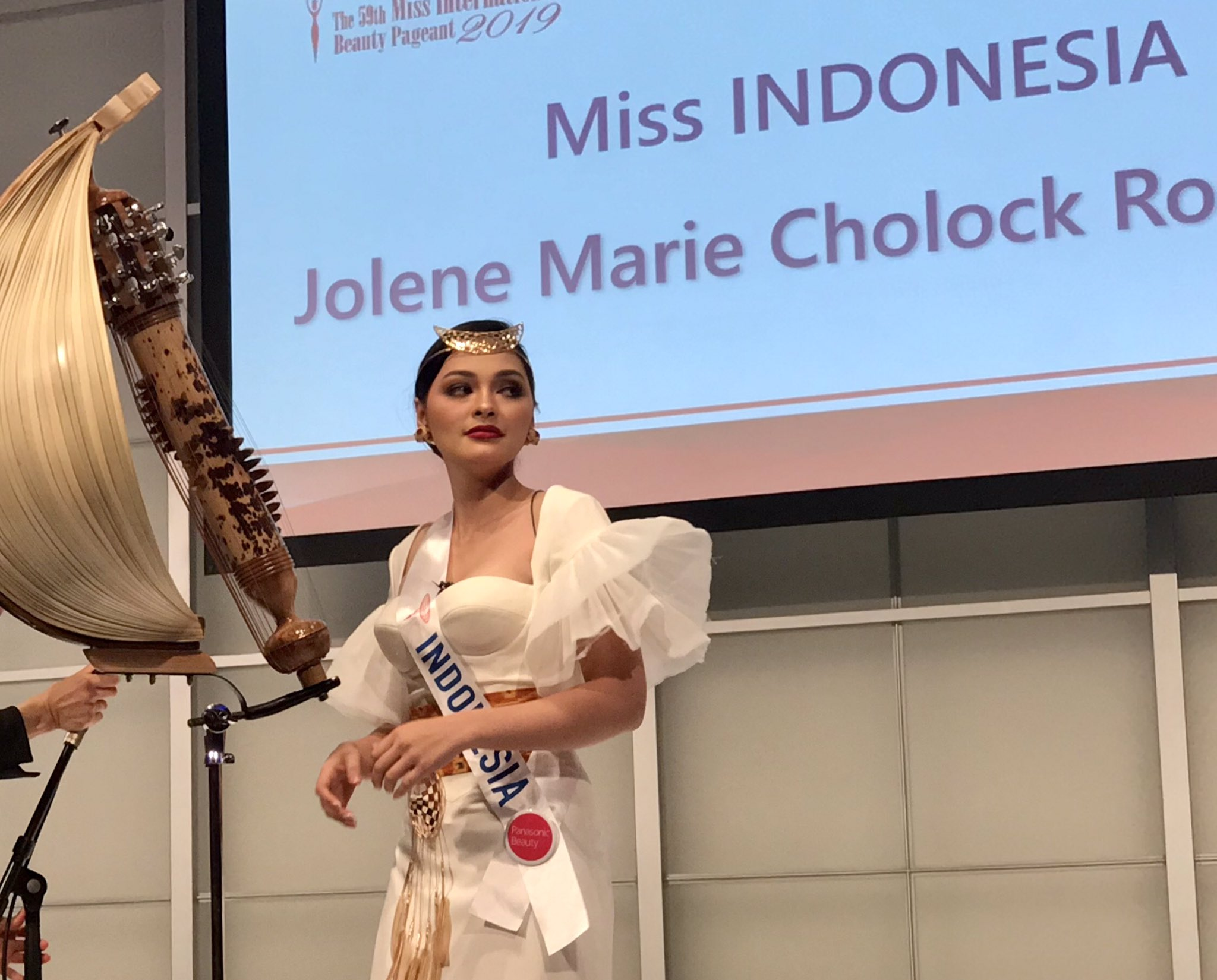
Rotinsulu playing Sasando, Wearing Ethnic Gown and "Bula Molik headpiece" designed by Davidson Laksono Lim, Yosep Sinudarsono and Yuli Ho.

Rotinsulu is a Disability rights activist who advocates for the elderly and people with disabilities, she built her own Nursing home care called "Saya Bisa", located in her hometown in Manado, that helped disabled elderly people with the movement of "1001 wheelchairs" and other physical disability support equipment. She also helped to develop the elderly skills with a project called "Du’Anyam", a forum to empower mothers and fathers to increase financial income by raising the culture of "weaving".

Rotinsulu also helps the children in isolated remote area, where she built "Nisnde Papua Foundation" in Nduga Regency, Papua Province, a foundation to provide routine medical checkup, vaccination and mainly education in various subjects and technologies and General Insights.

== Pageantry ==
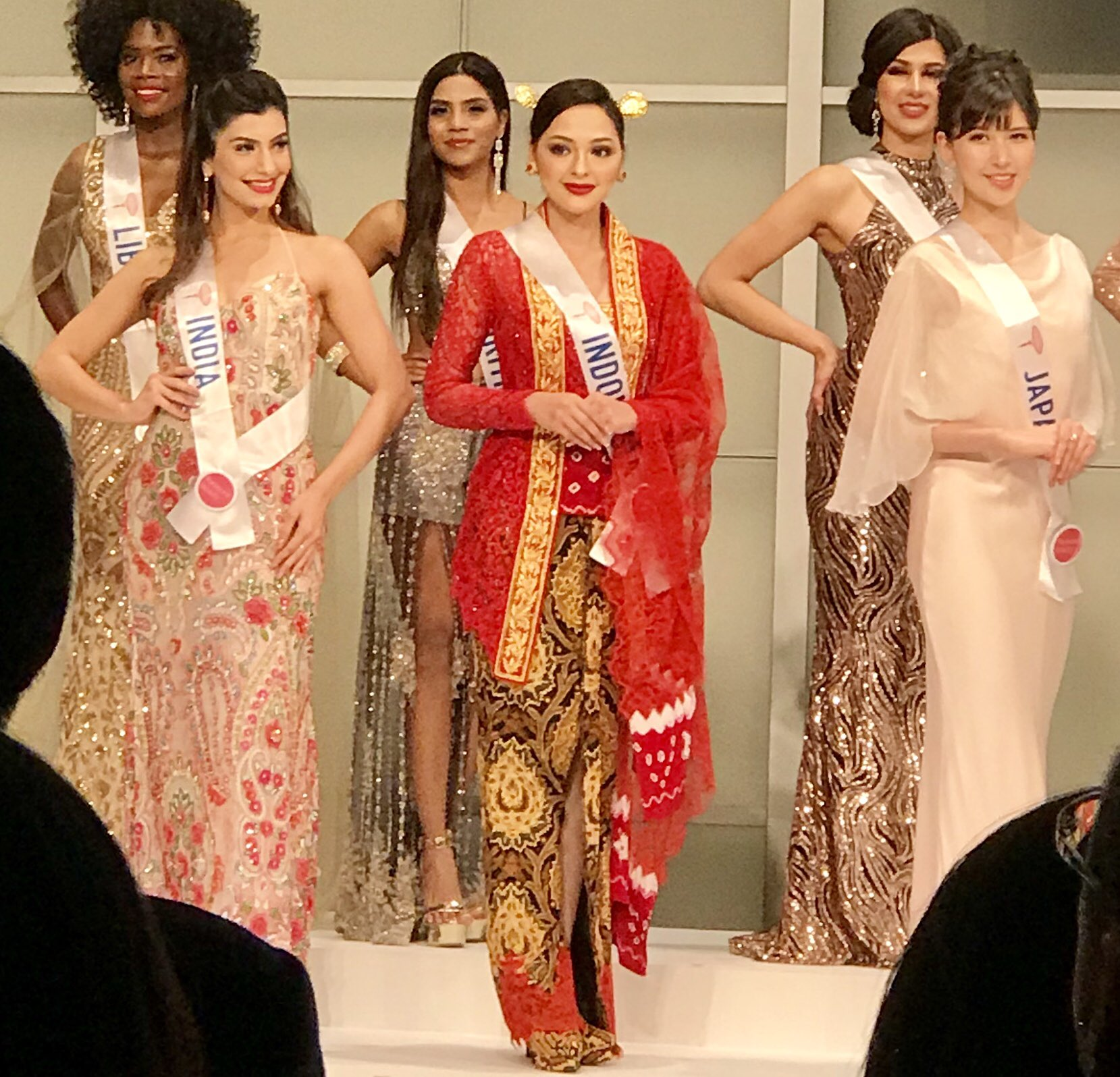
Rotinsulu in Miss International 2019 wearing Kutubaru kebaya designed by Intan Avantie.

=== Miss Celebrity Indonesia 2010 ===
Rotinsulu started her foray into the world of pageantry in 2010, at the age of fourteen where she joined the television celebrity beauty pageant contest Miss Celebrity Indonesia 2010 representing the city of Manado, North Sulawesi. The finale night was held in Jakarta, where she won 1st runner-up position and the Miss Photogenic award.

=== Puteri Indonesia 2019 ===
Rotinsulu was crowned as Puteri Indonesia Lingkungan 2019 (Miss International Indonesia 2019), at the grand finale held in Jakarta Convention Center, Jakarta on March 8, 2019 (International Women's Day) by the outgoing titleholder of Puteri Indonesia Lingkungan 2018 and Top-15 Miss International 2018, Vania Fitryanti Herlambang of Banten. She represented North Sulawesi province at the pageant and gained a special award as Puteri Indonesia of Sulawesi Islands.

The finale coronation night of Puteri Indonesia 2019 was also attended by the reigning Miss International 2018 – Mariem Claret Velazco García of Venezuela as a main Guest-star, and Miss International 2017, Kevin Lilliana Junaedy of Indonesia as a part of the selection committee. During her finale night speech for Puteri Indonesia 2019, Jolene successfully raised the awareness of a modern society effect topic, which is stereotypical beauty;

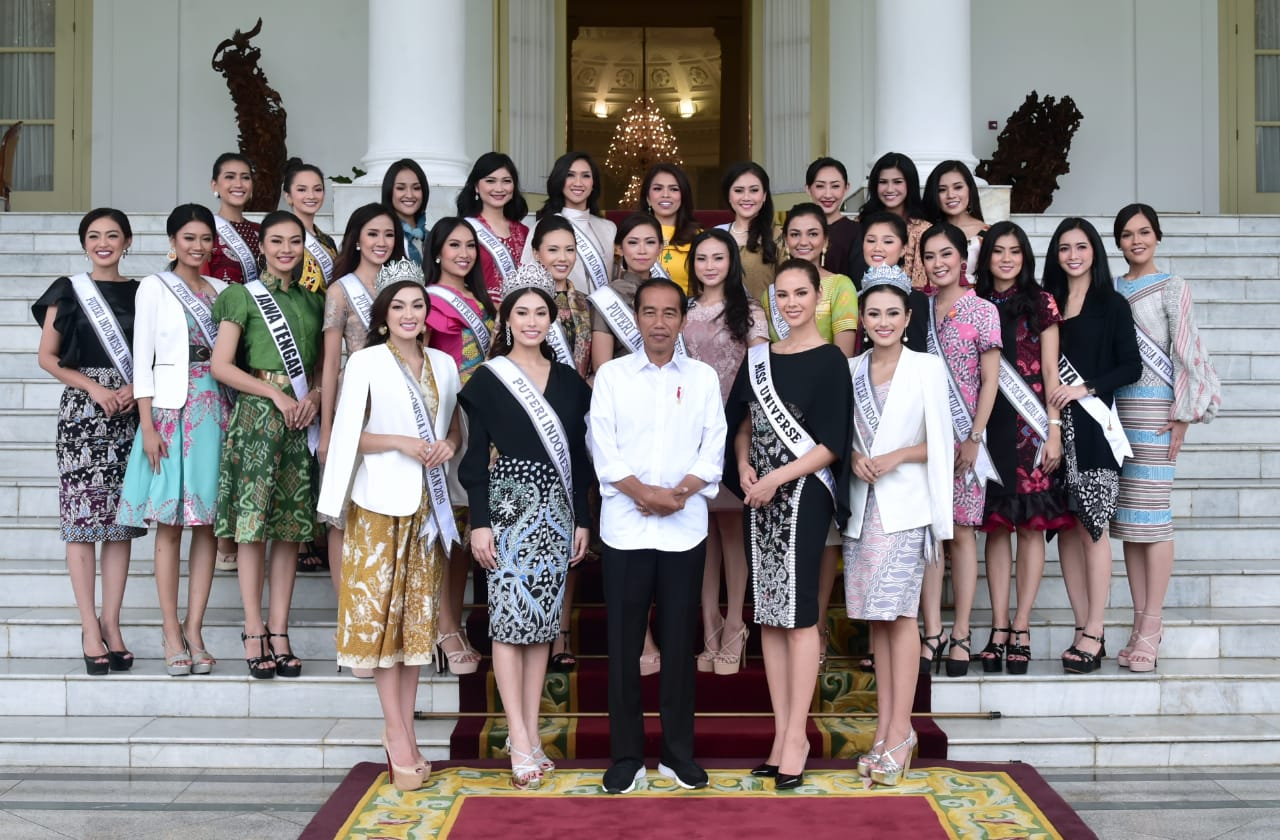
Rotinsulu alongside the contestants and winners of Puteri Indonesia 2019, Frederika Alexis Cull, Jesica Fitriana Martasari Alfharisi and the Miss Universe 2018, Catriona Gray. Meeting with the President Joko Widodo in Bogor Presidential palace in 2019.

"Stereotypes are main problem in this modern society. It put labels on how a person should act or live their life. For example, how a stereotypical person see beauty is not like what others define beauty itself. We must reject stereotypes especially about woman and how to live their life. I'm standing here tonight, calling out to all Indonesian beauties out there to value yourself more, to love yourself more, to focusing on inner beauty and your self actualization. And by that, we can change others, and even better we can change our nation. I'm Jolene Rotinsulu, Puteri Indonesia Sulawesi Utara 2019. Thank you..."

— Sri Juliati, "Profil Jolene Marie Cholock, Runner-up 1 Puteri Indonesia 2019", Tribun Network

During her reign as Puteri Indonesia Lingkungan 2019, She was a speaker at United Nations Environment Programme – Global Landscapes Forum in New York City, United States on September 28, 2019.

=== Miss International 2019 ===
After being crowned as Puteri Indonesia Lingkungan 2019, Cholock-Rotinsulu represented Indonesia at the 59th edition of Miss International 2019 beauty pageant, in Tokyo, Japan which was held on 12 November 2019. Where she finished in the Top 8. Mariem Claret Velazco García of Venezuela crowned her successor Sireethorn Leearamwat of Thailand at the end of the pageant.

== Filmography ==
Rotinsulu has appeared on several music videos as a model and singer. She has acted in several television and cinema film.

=== Film ===
Year	Title	Role	Production compan(ies)	Notes	Ref.
2016	I Am Hope	Mia on Theater	SinemArt		
2021	Paradise Garden	Ayunda	Screenplay Films and Wattpad		
2022	Mendua: The World of Married	Marsha Mahendra	Disney+ Hotstar and Screenplay Films	Originally Doctor Foster by the BBC	
2022	The Sexy Doctor is Mine	Fenina	Screenplay Films and Wattpad		
2023	Lampir	Wendy	Sinergi Pictures and Vision+		
TBA	The Sexy Doctor is Mine 2	Fenina	Screenplay Films and Wattpad		

=== Television films ===
Year	Title	Role	Network	Ref.
2010	Para Pencari Tuhan (Season 4) "God's Seekers (Season 4)"	as Mary	SCTV & FOX	
2012	Mengejar Cinta Olga 5 (Story of Olga) "Chasing the Love of Olga 5 (Story of Olga)"	as Maricha (Icha)	RCTI	

=== Television shows ===
Year	Title	Genre	Role	Production	Ref.
2019-2020	Opera Van Java	Wayang wong-Sitcom	Comedian	Trans7	
2020-2021	Lapor Pak!	Drama-Sitcom	Comedian	Trans7	
2021–present	Anak Sekolah	Drama-Sitcom	Comedian	Trans7	
2021–present	Showbiz News	Infotainment	Presenter	Metro TV	

=== Music videos ===
Year	Title	Role	Singer/Artist	Ref.
2012	Neng Neng Nong Neng (Ku Ingin Terus Lama Pacaran Disini) "I Want To Keep on Dating Here"	as model	T.R.I.A.D, Ahmad Dhani	
2013	Selamat Malam Kekasihku "Goodnite My Lover"	as model & co-singer	Revo Marty feat. Jolene Marie Cholock	
2022	Dimana Jodohku "Where is My Lover"	as model	Tata Janeeta	
2022	Terlalu Percaya Kamu "Trust You Too Much"	as singer	Herself	
2023	Gerimis "Drizzle"	as co-singer	KLa Project feat. Jolene Marie Cholock	

== Awards and nomination ==
Jolene received trophy for their contribution to Indonesian modeling and acting world.

Year	Awards	Category	Nominated work	Result	Ref.
2016	2016 Indonesian Movie Actors Awards	Favorite Newcomer Actress	I am Hope	Won	

== See also ==
- Puteri Indonesia 2019
- Miss International 2019
- Frederika Alexis Cull
- Jesica Fitriana Martasari

Awards and achievements
Preceded by Stevany Carolin Tanjaya Ticoalu	Puteri North Sulawesi; 2019	Succeeded by Desiree Magdalena Roring
Preceded by Vania Fitryanti Herlambang (Banten)	Puteri Indonesia Lingkungan; 2019	Succeeded by Putu Ayu Saraswati (Bali)
