= Pasar Minggu =

- District
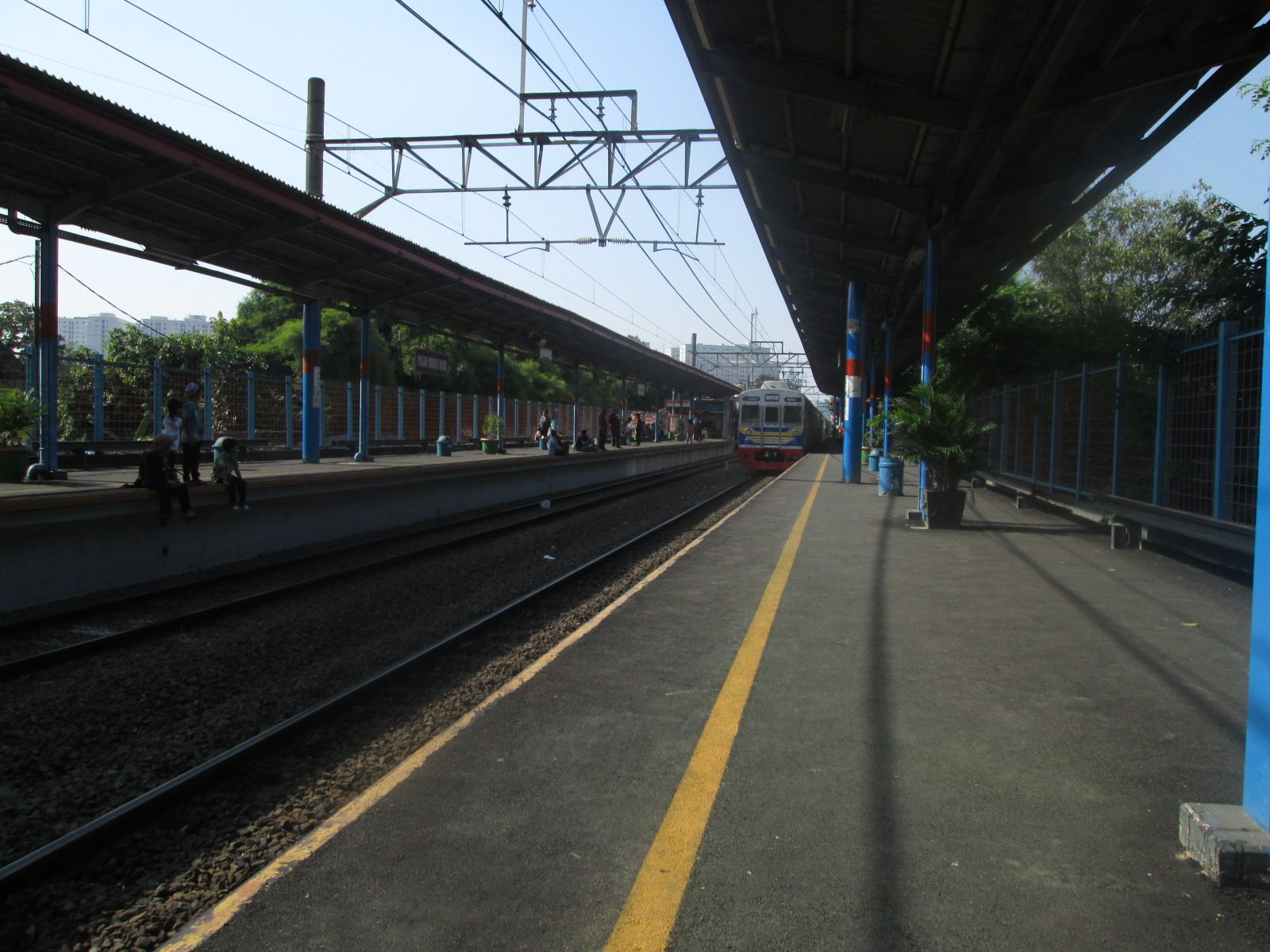
- Pasar Minggu Baru station
- Location in South Jakarta
- Country: Indonesia
- Province: Jakarta
- Administrative city: South Jakarta

Area
  - Total: 21.90 km^{2} (8.46 sq mi)
- Elevation: 36 m (118 ft)
- Postal code: 125XX

Pasar Minggu is a district (Indonesian: kecamatan) in the administrative city of South Jakarta, Indonesia. The area is known for its traditional Sunday market, famous for the fruit market. Historically, Pasar Minggu is a fruit cultivation area developed by the Dutch government during the colonial period. The central point of the cultivation area is the traditional market of Pasar Minggu, located in what is now the lower-division Pasar Minggu subdistrict. Teak forest could also be found in the Pasar Minggu district, notably around the Jati Padang (Javanese for "bright teak") subdistrict. Most of these areas have been converted into residential areas as Jakarta grows southward.

The boundary of Pasar Minggu is Kemang Selatan Road - Warung Jati Timur Road - Kalibata Timur Road to the north, Ciliwung River to the east, and Krukut River to the west.

The southern portion of Jakarta Outer Ring Road passed through Pasar Minggu district.

== Subdistricts ==
The district of Pasar Minggu is divided into seven kelurahan or subdistricts:

Name	Area code
Pejaten Barat	12510
Pejaten Timur	12510
Pasar Minggu	12520
Kebagusan	12520
Jati Padang	12540
Ragunan	12550
Cilandak Timur	12560

== History ==
According to the Dinas Kebudayaan dan Permuseuman DKI Jakarta, as cited by Asep Suryana in Pasar Minggu Tempo Doeloe: Dinamika Sosial Ekonomi Petani Buah 1921–1966, archaeological findings suggest that the Pasar Minggu area had been inhabited since the Neolithic and Bronze–Iron Ages, particularly along the Ciliwung riverbed.

The name Pasar Minggu derives from Pasar Minggu, a state-owned market located in the administrative village of the same name. The neighborhood of Pasar Minggu was – in the 17th-century – an ommelanden of Batavia located uphill. The land is located between the Ciliwung to the east and the stream of Mampang.

In 1706, Chastelein purchased land in Seringsing, located in the southern part of the Onderdistrik Pasar Minggu, along with nearby land in Depok, after achieving success in managing his coffee plantations in Weltevreden.

In the 18th-century, two parcels of land in what is now the district of Pasar Minggu were recorded as the property of Diogo Merendo and Simão Rodrigo who bought the land in mid 17th-century.

Before the construction of roads in 1830, the main transportation route connecting Pasar Minggu and Batavia was the Ciliwung River which was relatively dangerous. Since 31 January 1873, Pasar Minggu was connected to Batavia by a railway line, which included two stations—Pasar Minggu and Lenteng Agung—and one stop, Tanjung-West.

In early twentieth century, the colonial government acquired most of land in Onderdistrik Pasar Minggu. The only region that still had eigendom (private) status was only Lenteng Agung. Before the acquisition by the government, the main commodities of Pasar Minggu were rice and citronella oil. In 1937, after the Dutch surveyed and divided the particuliere landen, around 800 tenant farmers in Pasar Minggu acquired ownership of the land they had been cultivating. Most continued planting rice as their main crop, while secondary crops such as palawija—including vegetables and fruits—were grown only as complements in home gardens. The northern area of the onderdistrik were the first to plant secondary crops to make use of land that lacked irrigation.

On 1 April 1921, the Dutch colonial government established a fruit seedling center (Balai Pembibitan Buah-buahan) in Ragunan. In 1926–1927, the Resident of Batavia, Willemse, reported that fruit gardens in Pasar Minggu covered about 304 RU² and produced an estimated ƒ1,900,000 in value.

In 1934, the colonial government established a fruit market near the Pasar Minggu Station area. In 1938, only about 3 kilometers of road from Pasar Minggu Station toward Batavia were paved, while the remaining road network was still unpaved dirt roads.

In 1930s, Onderdistrik Pasar Minggu was under Distrik Keramat Jati, Regentschap Meester Cornelis.

=== Pasar Minggu Market ===
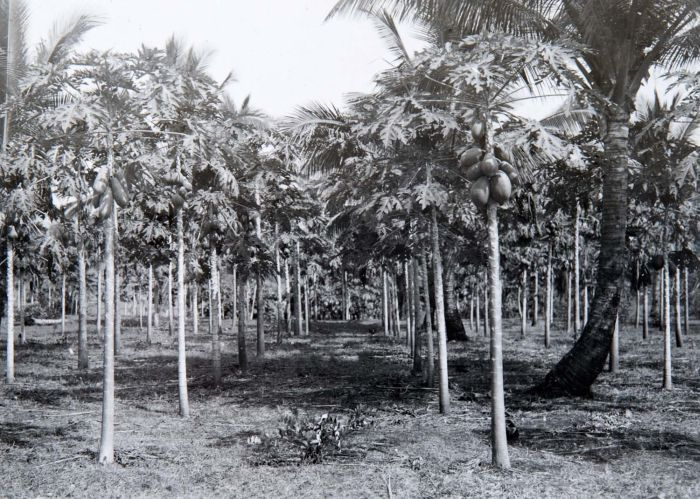
A 1930s picture of an experimental growing station of papaya in Pasar Minggu.

Before 1920, market activity in the area was centered in Kampung Lio, closer to the west bank of the Ciliwung. The market opened every Sunday morning, hence the name Pasar Minggu, Malay for "Sunday Market". Pasar Minggu mainly consisted of bamboo-structured stalls. At this time, the market was also known for its gambling activities and a ronggeng performance known as Doger.

In 1920, the location of the market was shifted closer to the railway line. Chinese merchants began setting up their activity in Pasar Minggu, mainly on rice-selling.

In 1930, land to the west of Jalan Pasar Minggu (formerly the property of Dales, who took residence in Tanjung West) was opened by the colonial government to establish a more permanent building for the market. The first structure built for the market was a simple steel structure topped with a zinc roof. The new market sold a variety of daily necessities e.g. clothing, as well as fruits, mostly collected from the surrounding orchards. Pasar Minggu was also set to open every day. Despite this, Pasar Minggu was still busier on Sunday. In 1931, the road connecting Pasar Minggu with Manggarai was paved, giving more access for people to Pasar Minggu.

Following the expansion of the boundary of the city of Jakarta, the area of Pasar Minggu was planned as a residential area. The plan converts some of the existing orchards into residential.

The present Pasar Minggu building was inaugurated by the governor of Jakarta at that time Governor Tjokropranolo in 1984.

== Landmarks ==
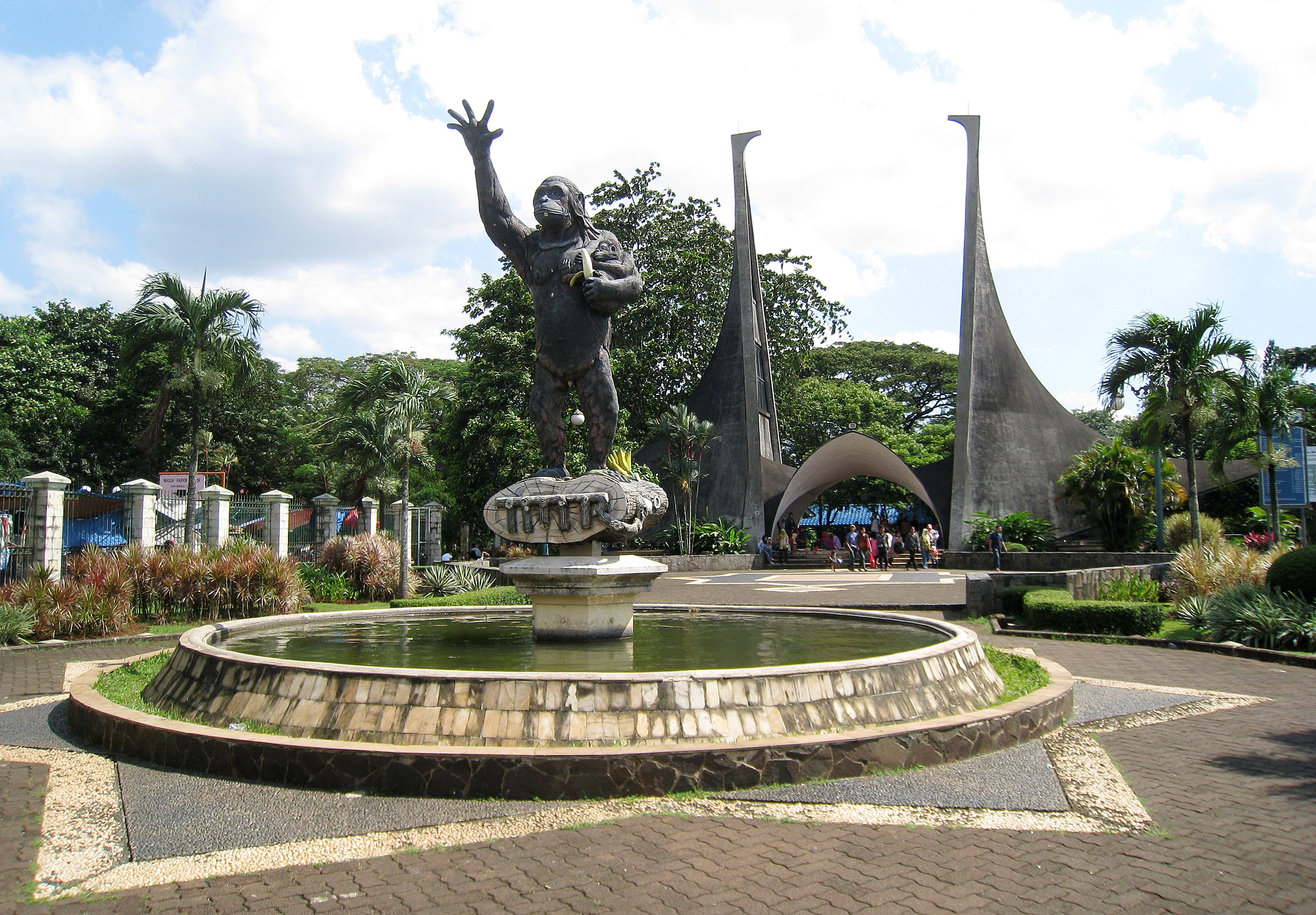
Ragunan Zoo.

- Pasar Minggu market, bus terminal, and railway station.
- Ministry of Agriculture building complex
- Ragunan Zoo
- Republika building

== Cited works ==
- Kaart van Batavia, tusschen de rivier Groot Tsjiakon, de rivier Crocot en het spruytjie Tsiroa [Map of Batavia, between the Great River Tsjiakon, River Krukut and the Stream Tsiroa.] (Map). 50 rhijnlandsche roeden (in Dutch). Cartography by J.J. Bollee. anonymous. c. 1700s.
- Budhisantoso, S.; et al. (1986). Alat Penjaja Tradisional Daerah Khusus Ibukota Jakarta (in Indonesian). Jakarta: Direktorat Jenderal Kebudayaan.
- Suryana, Asep (2012). Pasar Minggu Tempo Doeloe: Dinamika Sosial Ekonomi Petani Buah 1921-1966 (in Indonesian). LIPI Press. ISBN 978-602-496-299-9.
- Irsan, Yandri (2008). Keberadaan preman di Pasar Minggu dan penanganan oleh Polsek Metro Pasar Minggu (PDF) (Tesis Magister). Depok, Indonesia: Universitas Indonesia, Program Pascasarjana, Kajian Ilmu Kepolisian.
