= AIS Indonesia =

Australian Independent School Indonesia
- Jakarta and Bali; Indonesia

Information
- Other name: AIS Indonesia
- Former name: Australian International School-Indonesia
- Type: Private international school
- Motto: Uniting communities, empowering minds
- Established: 1996; 30 years ago
- Founder: Penny Robertson OAM
- Principal: Craig Eldred - Jakarta, John Milliss - Bali
- Years: Pre-school and K-12
- Enrolment: 400
- Mascot: Taipan
- Nickname: AIS
- Affiliations: International Baccalaureate World School; Council of International Schools
- Website: ais-indonesia.com

Australian Independent School Indonesia (AIS Indonesia), formerly the Australian International School-Indonesia, is a private international school that offers an Australian Curriculum pre-school and K-12 education located in three separate campuses in Indonesia.

Established in 1996, the school delivers a pre-school, primary school and secondary school education from its facilities in Pejaten Barat, that also incorporates the old secondary school campus. From its Bali campus, the school delivers a complete pre-school and K-12 education.

The school was granted "World School" status by the International Baccalaureate Organization (IBO) and offers the senior IB Diploma Programme at both the Pejaten and Bali campuses. In 2015, AIS Indonesia was fully accredited by the Council of International Schools (CIS).

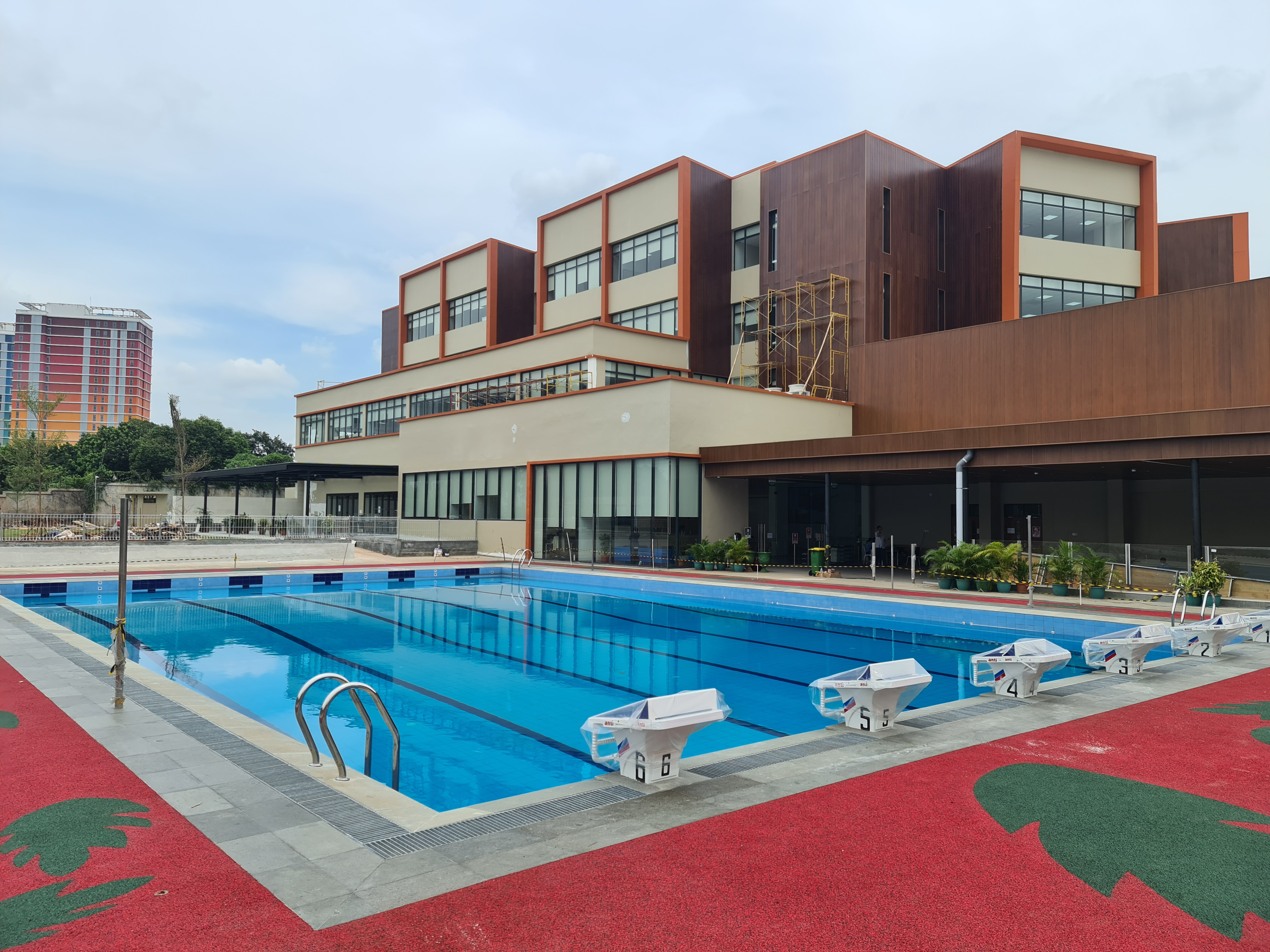
AIS building in Jakarta

== History ==
AIS Indonesia was founded in 1996 in response to a demand for inclusive education within the international schools in Indonesia. Prior to the formation of AIS, children with special educational needs were not accepted by any international school in Jakarta. With the involvement and support of professional educators, diplomatic and commercial representatives as well as a group of parents, the school opened on 15 July 1996 with an enrolment of eleven students. The Bali campus began operation in 1998 in Kerobokan and, in 2018, moved to a new campus in the nearby Imam Bonjol area. The school has also recently completed an exciting campus redevelopment project on land opposite the existing Secondary Campus in Jakarta, allowing all year levels from Preschool to Year 12 to study together on one site in purpose-built, contemporary and innovative learning spaces. These building projects will significantly increase AIS Indonesia's enrolment capacity.

As of 2021, the school includes students from over 25 nationalities and offers Preschool to Year 12 classes with special education for students with learning support needs, limited English language proficiency or physical disabilities.

In 2014, the school changed its name from "Australian International School" to "Australian Independent School" to comply with the Indonesian government's regulations prohibiting the use of the word 'international' in school names.

== Campuses ==
Jakarta
- AIS Jakarta - Pejaten Barat, South Jakarta

Bali

- AIS Bali - Imam Bonjol, Denpasar

== Principals ==
Ordinal	Name	Title	Term start	Term end	Time in office	Notes
1	Penny Robertson	Founding Principal	1996	2007	10–11 years	
2	Bruce Ferres	Principal	2008	2013	4–5 years	
3	Brenton Hall	Principal	2013	2019	12–13 years	
4	Henri Bemelmans	Principal	2019	2022	6–7 years	
5	John Milliss (Bali)	Principal	2019	incumbent	6–7 years	
6	Craig Eldred (Jakarta)	Principal	2025	2025	2–3 years	
7	Dean Cummins (Jakarta)	Principal	2025	incumbent	0 years	

== See also ==
- Australia–Indonesia relations
