= Pinka Hapsari =

Indonesian politician (born 1998)

Member of House of Representatives
- Incumbent
- Assumed office 1 October 2024
- President: Joko Widodo; Prabowo Subianto
- Constituency: Central Java IV

Personal details
- Born: Diah Pikatan Orissa Putri Haprani; December 8, 1998 (age 27) Jakarta
- Party: PDI-P
- Relations: Soekarno (great grandfather); Taufik Kiemas (grandfather); Megawati Soekarnoputri (grandmother)
- Parent(s): Hapsoro Sukmonohadi (father); Puan Maharani (mother)
- Education: SOAS University of London
- Occupation: Politician

Diah Pikatan Orissa Putri Haprani, known popularly as Pinka Hapsari (born 8 December 1998) is an Indonesian politician. A politician from the Indonesian Democratic Party of Struggle, she is currently serving as a member of the House of Representatives since 2024.

She was the daughter of Speaker of the House of Representatives Puan Maharani, granddaughter of former president Megawati Sukarnoputri and great granddaughter of Sukarno. She pursued her education in the field of International Relations at SOAS, University of London.

In the 2024 Indonesian legislative election, she ran in the Central Java IV electoral district, securing 101,125 votes, and was appointed as a member of the House of Representatives of the Republic of Indonesia for the 2024–2029 term.
