= Lampir =

2024 Indonesian film by Kenny Gulardi

- Theatrical release poster
- Directed by: Kenny Gulardi
- Written by: Kenny Gulardi
- Produced by: Gandhi Fernando; Philip Lesmana; Rick Soerafani; Thaleb Wahjudi
- Starring: Jolene Marie; Rory Asyari; Gandhi Fernando; Hana Saraswati; Sheila Salsabila; Ge Pamungkas; Ardina Rasti
- Cinematography: Budi Utomo
- Edited by: Ahmad Rifai
- Production companies: Sinergi Pictures; Vision+; Creator Pictures
- Release date: 2024
- Country: Indonesia
- Language: Indonesian

Lampir is a 2024 Indonesian supernatural horror film written and directed by Kenny Gulardi, and starring Jolene Marie, Rory Asyari, Gandhi Fernando, Hana Saraswati, Sheila Salsabila, Ge Pamungkas, and Ardina Rasti. It is based on the legend of Mak Lampir, a ghost woman who desires eternal beauty.

Lampir received a theatrical release in Indonesia on 14 February 2024.

== Cast ==
- Jolene Marie as Wendy
- Rory Asyari as Angga
- Gandhi Fernando as Robbie
- Hana Saraswati as Nanda
- Sheila Salsabila as Agnez
- Ge Pamungkas as Rizki
- Ardina Rasti as Lampir

== See also ==
- Misteri Gunung Merapi (TV series) – a 1998–2005 TV series featuring the Mak Lampir character
