= Jesica Fitriana =

Miss Supranational Indonesia 2019

Jesica Fitriana Martasari
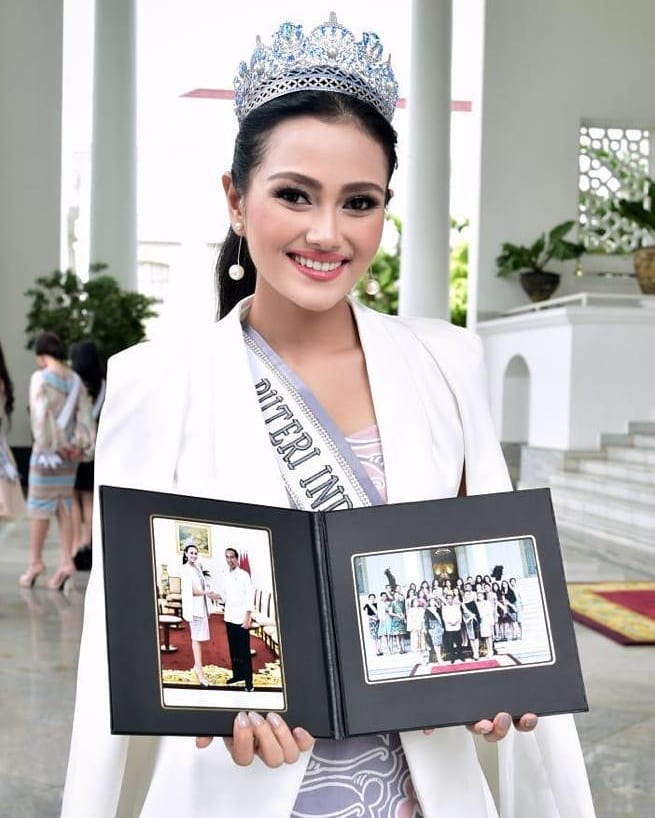
- Fitriana at Bogor Palace, holding photos of her meeting with president Joko Widodo in 2019.
- Born: Jesica Fitriana Martasari Alfharisi; 31 March 1995 (age 31); Bogor, West Java, Indonesia
- Education: Bandung Institute of Technology
- Occupations: Indonesian Ambassador for Ministry of Tourism (Indonesia); HIV/AIDS activist; TV Commercial model; Beauty pageant titleholders
- Height: 5 ft 7 in (1.70 m)
- Beauty pageant titleholder
- Title: Puteri Indonesia Pariwisata 2019; Miss Supranational Indonesia 2019
- Hair color: Black
- Eye color: Brown
- Major competitions: Puteri Indonesia Jawa Barat 2018; (1st Runner-up); Puteri Indonesia Jawa Barat 2019; (Winner); Puteri Indonesia 2019; (2nd Runner-up – Puteri Indonesia Pariwisata); Miss Supranational 2019; (2nd Runner-up)

Jesica Fitriana Martasari Alfharisi (born March 31, 1995) is an Indonesian Ministry of Tourism Ambassador, HIV/AIDS activist, furniture designer, TV commercial model and a beauty pageant titleholder who won the title of Puteri Indonesia Pariwisata 2019. She represented Indonesia at the Miss Supranational 2019 pageant, where she placed as the 2nd Runner-Up, the highest placement of Indonesia at the Miss Supranational pageant, became the sixth Indonesian to be placed as a finalist in Miss Supranational history, continuing the fifth year placement streak of Indonesia, consecutively since Gresya Amanda Maaliwuga in 2015, Intan Aletrinö in 2016, Karina Nadila Niab in 2017 and Wilda Octaviana Situngkir in 2018.

== Early life and education ==
Jesica was born in Bogor, West Java, Indonesia, to a Pakistani-Dutch-born Indonesian father, Malik Alfharisi from Karachi, and an Indonesian mother, Neneng Nurbaiti Martasari from Sundanese ethnic. She has one younger brother named Alris Alfharisi. She has been working as a model since the age of 15, and her hobbies includes dancing and boxing. She has also been working as the Ambassador for Ministry of Tourism of Indonesia since she was crowned as Puteri Indonesia Pariwisata 2019. She holds a bachelor degree in Business Management from Bandung Institute of Technology, Bandung, West Java, Indonesia. After graduated she ran her own furniture design studio, together with her family.

Jesica is an aspirator and activist for an organization that saves and protect toddler and children survivors of HIV/AIDS caused by HIV in Pregnancy issues. To overcome this, in 2016 she collaborated with the local organization to arrange her own NGO, called "ADHA House" in Bogor, which has been active and focusing on "ADHA" (children who fight against HIV/AIDS from their own parents) by giving them access to get free Antiviral therapy, Antiviral therapy, anti-HIV therapy (HAART), proper nutrition for managing this condition and Mental Health for toddler and children.

== Pageantry ==
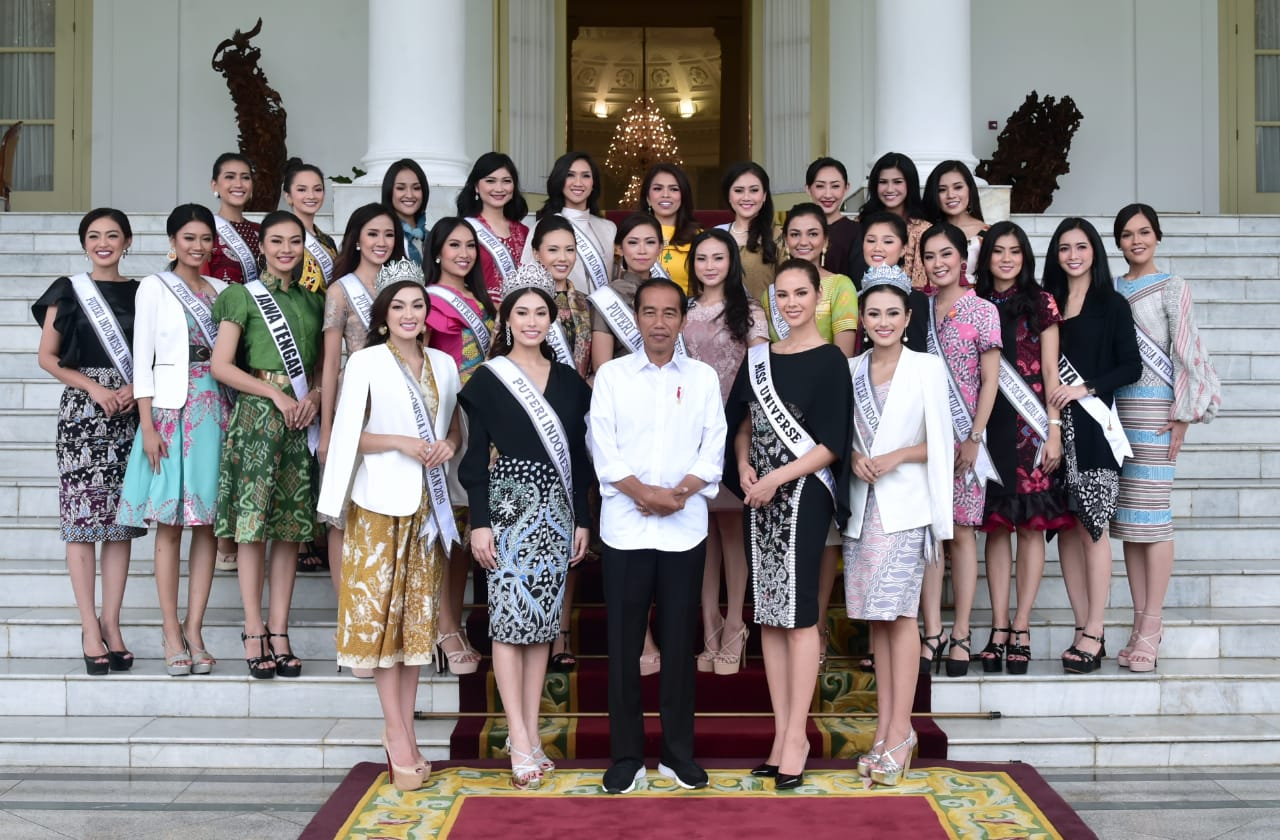
Jesica alongside the contestants and winners of Puteri Indonesia 2019, Jolene Marie Cholock-Rotinsulu, Frederika Alexis Cull and the Miss Universe 2018, Catriona Gray. Meeting with the President Joko Widodo in Bogor Presidential palace in 2019.

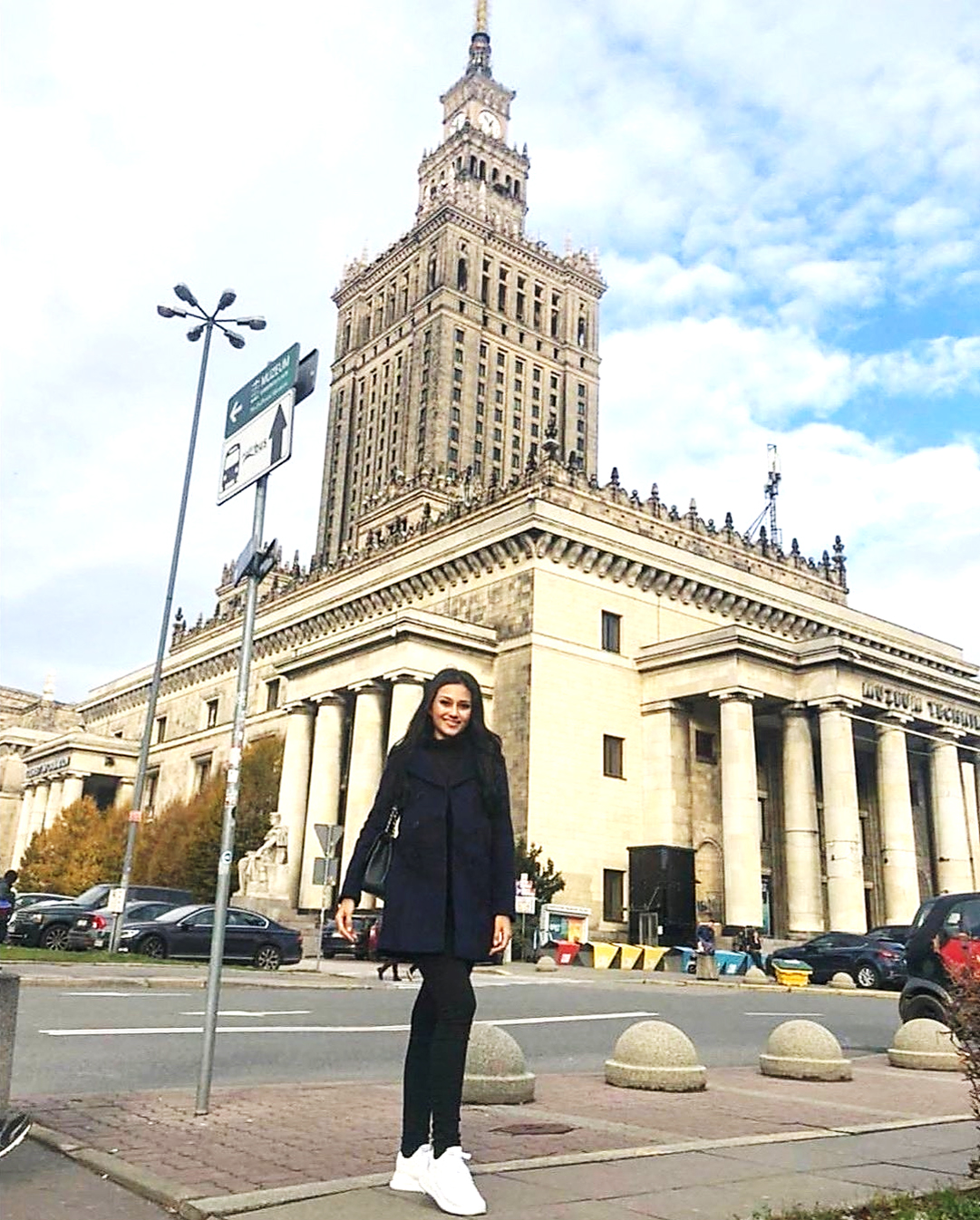
Jesica in front of the Palace of Culture and Science building in Poland, as she ready to compete for Miss Supranational 2019

=== Puteri West Java 2018-2019 ===
Jesica competed in the regional pageant of Puteri West Java Pageant two times in 2018 and 2019, before winning the title to represent her province West Java in Puteri Indonesia 2019.

=== Puteri Indonesia 2019 ===
Jesica represented the West Java province at the pageant, where Jesica was crowned as Puteri Indonesia Pariwisata 2019 at the grand finale held in Jakarta Convention Center on March 8, 2019 (International Women's Day) by the outgoing titleholder of Puteri Indonesia Pariwisata 2018 and the 3rd Runner-up Miss Supranational 2018, Wilda Octaviana Situngkir of West Kalimantan. She was also nominated for the "Best in Talent" award.

At her national competition, during her finale night speech for Puteri Indonesia 2019, Jesica successfully raised the awareness about gender equality topic;

Jesica:"...Due to biological differences between men and women socially constructed behaviors, attribute, activity and also rules that a given society appreciates woman in life. In the past, gender polarization included rules, prevented women with so many thing, such as going to school, attending social event and also other things. But nowadays woman are changing, woman are changing their world, their traits and their future, therefore we women should no longer being polarized as a weaker gender. I am Jesica Fitriana Martasari, I am Puteri Indonesia Jawa Barat 2019, Thank You..."

— "Puteri Indonesia 2019, Top 11 Speech Competition (HD)", Vidio

The finale coronation night of Puteri Indonesia 2019 was attended by the reigning Miss Supranational 2018 - Valeria Vázquez of Puerto Rico as a main Guest-star and Miss Supranational 2017 - Jenny Kim of Korea as part of the selection committee. Jesica was crowned together with Frederika Alexis Cull as Puteri Indonesia 2019 and Jolene Marie Cholock-Rotinsulu as Puteri Indonesia Lingkungan 2019.

=== Miss Supranational 2019 ===
As Puteri Indonesia Pariwisata 2019, Jesica represented Indonesia at the 11th edition of Miss Supranational 2019 pageant in Katowice International Congress Centre, Katowice, Silesian - Poland, the finale coronation night was held on 6 December 2019. Jesica competed with the other 77 countries, where she ended-up crowned as the "2nd runner-up" of Miss Supranational 2019. She is also won several awards; "Supra Fan Vote Winner", "Women of Substance", and "2nd Runner-up Best National Costume". Valeria Vázquez of Puerto Rico crowned her successor Anntonia Porsild of Thailand by the end of the event.

== See also ==
- Puteri Indonesia 2019
- Miss Supranational 2019
- Frederika Alexis Cull
- Jolene Marie Cholock-Rotinsulu

Awards and achievements
Preceded by Tria Devitasari	Puteri West Java; 2019	Succeeded by Jeanatasia Kurniasari Soebagio
Preceded by Wilda Octaviana (West Kalimantan)	Puteri Indonesia Pariwisata; 2019	Succeeded by Jihane Almira Chedid (Central Java)
Preceded by (Poland) Magdalena Bieńkowska	2nd Runner-up Miss Supranational; 2019	Succeeded by (South Africa) Thato Mosehle
