= Pejaten Barat =

West Pejaten (Indonesian: Pejaten Barat, IPA: Pədʒaten) is an administrative village In Pasar Minggu, South Jakarta, Indonesia.
