= Kebagusan =

- Interactive map of Kebagusan
- Country: Indonesia

Kebagusan is administrative village (kelurahan in Indonesian) at Pasar Minggu subdistrict, South Jakarta. The border of Kebagusan are:

- Pasar Minggu administrative village in the north
- Ragunan administrative village in the west
- Lenteng Agung administrative village in Jagakarsa subdistrict, in the east
- Jagakarsa administrative village in Jagakarsa subdistrict, in the south

The zip code of this administrative village is 12520.

Kebagusan is famous as the residence of former Indonesian president, Megawati Sukarnoputri.

== Toponym ==
Kebagusan area was originally a teak forest. The name Kebagusan is said to have come from Nyai Tubagus Latak Lanang, a virtuous woman of Banten known for her beauty. Many men wanted to marry her, but she refused and went into the teak forest to meditate. Later she was killed when fire broke out inside the teak forest. This event is commemorated under the name of the Administrative Village of Jati Padang, which came from the Javanese jati, "teak", and padang, "bright", referring to the brightness of the fire when it happened in the teak forest.
