= Stephen Collins (disambiguation) =

Stephen Collins (born 1947) is an American former actor.

Stephen, Steve, or Steven Collins may also refer to:

== Sport ==
- Steve Collins (baseball) (1918–?), minor league player and manager
- Steve Collins (footballer) (born 1962), English
- Steve Collins (ski jumper) (born 1964), Canadian
- Steve Collins (born 1964), Irish boxer
- Steve Collins (American football) (born 1970), Oklahoma Sooners quarterback
- Steve Collins (rugby league) (born 1974), rugby league footballer of the 1990s and 2000s

== Other ==
- Stephen Collins (politician) (1847–1925), British MP for Kennington
- Steven Collins (archaeologist) (born 1950), American
- Steven Collins (Buddhist studies scholar) (1951–2018), English
- Steve Collins (engineer), American spacecraft engineer
- Stephen Collins (journalist), Irish journalist
- Steve Collins (doctor), Irish doctor and famine researcher
- Steven Collins, computer science lecturer
- Stephen Collins, a character in the BBC series State of Play

== See also ==
- Stephen Dando-Collins (born 1950), Australian historian and novelist
- Stephen Collins House, Ottawa, Ontario
- Collins (surname)
