= Malnutrition in Zimbabwe =

== Overview ==
Zimbabwe, a country in southern Africa, is suffering widespread malnutrition and diseases, such as HIV/AIDS, tuberculosis, and malaria. "One in four human beings is malnourished" in Africa, but Zimbabwe is near the deep end with almost 12,000 children alone suffering from severe malnutrition (Turner 8). Zimbabweans suffer from lack of food, sustenance, and the politicization of food, but these can be fixed by the fortification of basic foods, the resolution of the political problems in Zimbabwe, and continuing aid from non-governmental organizations (NGOs). Causes of malnutrition include unending poverty.
