= Steve Collins (doctor) =

Famine researcher from the UK

Steve Collins (born 1962) is a medical doctor from the UK who is known for transforming the treatment of malnutrition in famine through his NGO Valid International.

== Early life and education ==
Collins is from the United Kingdom and lives in Ireland. He has an MBBS in medicine from St Bartholomew's Hospital in London (1989), a BSc in Philosophy and Anthropology from University College London, and an MD clinical doctorate in nutrition from the University of London in 2001. While he was in medical school, he traveled through the Congo, Chad, and Uganda during wartime, witnessing famine conditions.

== Career ==
Collins' first work was in refugee re-feeding centers in Somalia. He saw issues with both nutrition approaches and failures in procedures and strategies in place to help the starving. He saw that people collecting in feeding centers was a disease risk and parents couldn't be away from work for too long, so he started a program where people would be given food to bring back to their communities. He further refined and studied this idea and in 1998, developed the Community based Therapeutic Care model, a decentralized model now called the community based management of acute malnutrition (CMAM) model.

The CMAM model incorporates ready to use foods, a standard accepted by the World Health Organization. He did CMAM work in Ethiopia, setting up community-based treatment programs, a process which reduced mortality to four percent. The project used Plumpy’Nut, as well as simple screening methods for child malnutrition and was first tested in Ethiopia. The UN and the World Health Organization endorsed the project and it was expanded to Somalia and the Sudan.

Collins is one of the two founders of the companies Valid International and Valid Nutrition with Paul Murphy. The company worked to create and test an amino-acid-enhanced, plant-based ready-to-use therapeutic food. He believes that solutions to global poverty have to be both aid and business driven, to encourage businesses to provide "attractive nutrition" that can use the products of small local farmers.

Collins is a visiting research fellow at the Institute of Child Health in London. His research has been published in Nature and The Lancet.

In 2021, he co-founded Aronia Ireland to develop and market polyphenol-rich supplements to improve metabolic health and prevent chronic illness; the company released the PhyterBerry range of aronia supplements onto the Irish market in 2022.

== Honors and awards ==
In 2001, he received an MBE for his services to humanitarianism. In 2010 was elected a Senior Fellow of Ashoka.

== Personal life ==
Collins became an Irish national in 2020 and now lives with his wife and three children in West Cork, running a regenerative organic farm.
