= Community Therapeutic Care =

Community Therapeutic Care is a new approach to dealing with acute malnutrition.

Community-based Therapeutic Care (CTC) was developed to improve the coverage and impact of selective feeding programs for the treatment of malnutrition. Its central innovation is to provide therapeutic feeding in the home.

Before the development of CTC, the traditional way of treating malnutrition was through therapeutic feeding centers: large centers where patients are admitted for an average of 30 days. Carers of malnourished children often have to travel long distances to access these centers, many having to leave the rest of their children at home for three weeks or longer. Research by Steve Collins and others highlighted the need for at-home solutions.

Until recently, therapeutic feeding centers, that require long inpatient stays, have been the only accepted mode of treatment for severe acute malnutrition. CTC programmes treat the majority of these cases at home and aim to restrict inpatient care to only those suffering from acute malnutrition with medical complications. They use decentralised networks of outpatient treatment sites to provide a take-home food ration known as Ready-to-Use Therapeutic Food (RUTF) along with routine medicines.

By providing easy access and reducing the opportunity costs associated with enrollment in a therapeutic feeding programme, the CTC model increases the coverage and impact of humanitarian feeding interventions.

During the early years, the focus of CTC was on developing and demonstrating a model that can achieve rapid and widespread impact on the mortality and morbidity of children under five in emergency situations. Data from CTC programmes demonstrate that CTC can achieve very high coverage and excellent recovery rates. CTC has gained widespread acceptance in the humanitarian sector and is now the preferred model for selective feeding in emergency contexts.
