= Steve Collins (engineer) =

American physicist and engineer

Steve Collins is an American physicist and engineer best known for his role in NASA's Mars exploration program.

== Education and early-life ==
Collins earned degrees in physics and theater arts from the University of California Santa Cruz He is the son of Emmy winning cinematographer Bob Collins best known for his work on Superman and Miami Vice.

== Career ==
Collins worked in the motion picture industry for a few years after graduation before being hired by NASA's Jet Propulsion Laboratory. He has worked on the Psyche, Deep Impact and Deep Space One missions on attitude, guidance and control. He worked as team lead on the Mars Exploration Program. Collins served as senior guidance and control engineer on the Mars Science Laboratory mission. Collins' long hair along with Bobak Ferdowsi's mohawk, also drew attention as a new face of NASA.

Outside of NASA, Collins acts in community theater including a part in a musical Star Trek parody presented by the Caltech theater arts department. He also plays for JPL's employee soccer team, The Cosmics, and races autocross.
