= Miss Universe Indonesia =

National beauty pageant competition in Indonesia

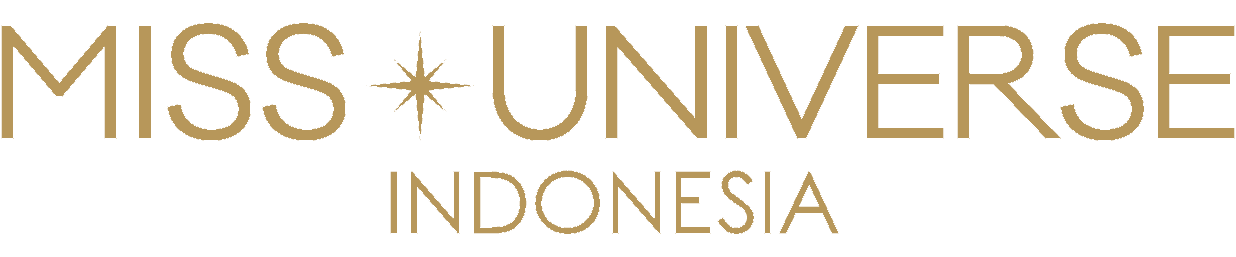
- Type: Beauty pageant
- Country represented: Indonesia
- Qualifies for: Miss Universe
- First edition: 2023
- Most recent edition: 2025
- Current titleholder: Sanly Liu; Bali
- Language: Bahasa Indonesia; English
- Predecessor: Puteri Indonesia

Miss Universe Indonesia (abbreviated as MUID) is a beauty pageant and organization that selects Indonesia's official representative for Miss Universe — one of the Big Four international beauty pageants.

The reigning Miss Universe Indonesia is Sanly Liu of Denpasar who was crowned on September 22, 2025, at the Opus Grand Ballroom, The Tribrata, in Jakarta, Indonesia.

== History ==
Before Puteri Indonesia under PT Mustika Ratu Tbk., the Indonesia's representations were crowned by national pageants called Ratu Indonesia, Miss Indonesia, and Miss Jawa. Andy Nurhayati who owned Andi Beauty Institute Jakarta was the key person who took the franchise for Miss Universe in Indonesia. Began 1980s, the selection held in closed selection by her, since there was banning system from the government about beauty pageants.

- Ratu Indonesia: This beauty event was first held in 1971 and transformed into Puteri Indonesia in the 4th year of implementation, 1975. It had a hiatus for 1 year in 1974 and was officially closed in 1978. During the program there were 3 main titles at Puteri Indonesia in that time: Puteri Indonesia as the Main Winner, Puteri Duta Indonesia as the 1st Runner-up, and Puteri Pariwisata Indonesia as the 2nd Runner-up. In 1992, Mrs. Mooryati Soedibyo began developing the Puteri Indonesia program and officially holds the license for Miss Universe and several other licenses.
- Closed Selection: Andy Nurhayati, as the owner of the Miss Universe license and various world beauty pageants, began trying to carry out a closed selection program to send representatives to several beauty pageants such as Miss Universe. This is done through casting and around 5 winners are appointed between 1978 and 1983.

Puteri Indonesia organization was still sending Indonesia's representative for Miss Universe in 1995 and 1996, however from 1997 until 2004, its winners were forced to withdraw from competing at the Miss Universe pageant by the decision of the former First Lady, Mrs. Tien Suharto. Puteri Indonesia's winners were again sent to the Miss Universe after receiving support and permission from Megawati Soekarnoputri, the first-ever female president of Indonesia. The pageant has been held consecutively every year, with the winner and the runner-ups sent to participate in international beauty pageants, from Artika Sari Devi who represented Indonesia at the Miss Universe 2005 in Thailand until Laksmi Shari De-Neefe Suardana who represented the country in 2022. Under Puteri Indonesia organization, 19 representatives have been sent to Miss Universe pageant in 1995–1996, 2005–2020 and 2022.

On February 8, 2023, the Miss Universe franchise in Indonesia was officially granted to a new organizing body with Poppy Capella as its national director and Eldwen Wang as its CEO and Communication Director, paving the way for the creation of the new Miss Universe Indonesia Organization under PT. Capella Swastika Karya, Inc. Under the new organization, a separate, standalone pageant is now responsible for the selection of the future Miss Universe Indonesia titleholders from 2023 onwards. The press launch of the pageants in Nusa Dua, Bali was attended by the Miss Universe 2022 R'Bonney Gabriel, 2nd runner-up and top 5 of Miss Universe 2022, Andreína Martínez and Gabriëla Dos Santos, respectively.

On August 12, 2023, the Miss Universe Organization officially terminated their franchise contract with PT. Capella Swastika Karya and Capella after a sexual abuse scandal which happened at the Miss Universe Indonesia 2023 event. However, Fabiënne Nicole Groeneveld would still represent Indonesia in Miss Universe 2023.

On July 18, 2024, it was announced that Indonesian actor and businessman Teuku Jordan Zacky was appointed as the new national director for Miss Universe Indonesia pageant.

On May 5, 2025, Zacky announced on his Instagram account that he has resigned from his position since December 2024 after considering many factors, including the fact that the licensing of Miss Universe globally is not under the authority of individual countries, including Indonesia. As a result, it was announced on May 23, 2025, that Indonesian supermodel Kelly Tandiono has taken over Zacky's position as the Miss Universe Indonesia national director.

On May 5, 2026, Nawat Itsaragrisil, the president of the Miss Grand International organization and national director of Miss Universe Thailand, announced on his social media pages that he has acquired the Miss Universe Indonesia license, alongside Miss Universe Vietnam, Miss Universe Laos, Miss Universe Malaysia, and Miss Universe Singapore, effectively ending Kelly's tenure as national director.

== Editions ==
The following is a list of Miss Universe Indonesia editions from its inception in 2023.

Year	Edition	Winner	Date	Venue	Entrants	Host city	Ref
2023	1st	Jakarta	August 3, 2023	Beach City International Stadium, Jakarta	30	Jakarta SCR	
2024	2nd	Banten	September 19, 2024	The H Club SCBD, Jakarta	14	Jakarta SCR	
2025	3rd	Bali	September 22, 2025	The Tribrata, Jakarta	16	Jakarta SCR	
2026	-	-	-	TBA		Jakarta SCR	

== Titleholders ==
The winner of the contest receives the title Miss Universe Indonesia and is eligible to represent Indonesia in the Miss Universe pageant.

Year	Miss Universe Indonesia	1st Runner-up	2nd Runner-up	3rd Runner-up	4th Runner-up
2023	Fabiënne Nicole Groeneveld; Jakarta SCR	Vina Anggi Sitorus; North Sumatra	Muthia Fatika Rahman; West Java	Angela Lillo; Riau Islands	Baby Kristami; Jakarta SCR
2024	Clara Shafira Krebs; Banten	Fiza Javaid Khan; Jakarta SCR	Nadia Ingrida Tjuatja; East Java	Not awarded	
2025	Sanly Liu; Bali	Rita Nurmaliza Alizar; Riau	Kirana Larasati Hanafiah; Jakarta SCR	Not awarded	

== International representations ==
This is a list of Miss Universe Indonesia titleholders who have competed in the Miss Universe pageant since Miss Universe Indonesia's inception in 2023.

Color key

- : Declared as Winner
- : Ended as runner-up
- : Ended as one of the finalists or semi-finalists

Year	Province	Miss Universe Indonesia	International pageant	Placement at Miss Universe	Special awards	Notes
2023	Jakarta SCR	Fabiënne Groeneveld	Miss Universe 2023	Unplaced		Groeneveld competed in Miss Universe under direct auspices of the Miss Universe Organization, as Poppy Capella, the license owner at the time, was dismissed for sexual harassment controversy before Groeneveld could compete.
2024	Banten	Clara Shafira Krebs	Miss Universe 2024	Unplaced		
2025	Bali	Sanly Liu	Miss Universe 2025	Unplaced	Best Skin Award	

== Before Miss Universe Indonesia ==
This is a list of Indonesian titleholders who had competed in the Miss Universe pageant prior to Miss Universe Indonesia pageant's inception in 2023. Indonesia had competed 26 times, placed 8 times, and won several special and sponsor awards, including Best in National Costume in 2014; Popular Vote in 2009; Miss Phoenix Smile in 2016.

Color key

- : Declared as Winner
- : Ended as runner-up
- : Ended as one of the finalists or semi-finalists
- : Ended as Special awards winner

Year	Province	Puteri Indonesia	National title	Placement at Miss Universe	Special awards	Notes
2022	Bali	Laksmi Shari De-Neefe Suardana	Puteri Indonesia 2022	Unplaced		
Did not compete in 2021: Withdrew because of no diplomatic relations between Indonesian government and the host country of Israel .
2020	East Java	Raden Roro Ayu Maulida Putri	Puteri Indonesia 2020	Top 21		Before winning Puteri Indonesia 2020, Ayu won the Face of Asia 2019 in South Korea.
2019	Jakarta SCR	Frederika Alexis Cull	Puteri Indonesia 2019	Top 10		
2018	Bangka Belitung	Sonia Fergina Citra	Puteri Indonesia 2018	Top 20		Sonia was competing at Miss Oriental Tourism 2012 and was achieving the Top 6 at the pageant.
2017	Jakarta SCR	Bunga Jelitha Ibrani	Puteri Indonesia 2017	Unplaced		Bunga experienced in modelling competition and won the Supermodel International 2011, also the Guess Girl Southeast Asia 2015.
2016	North Sulawesi	Kezia Roslin Cikita Warouw	Puteri Indonesia 2016	Top 13	Miss Phoenix Smile; Best National Costume (Top 12)	
2015	Central Java	Anindya Kusuma Putri	Puteri Indonesia 2015	Top 15		
2014	East Java	Elvira Devinamira Wirayanti	Puteri Indonesia 2014	Top 15	Best National Costume	
2013	West Sumatra	Whulandary Herman	Puteri Indonesia 2013	Top 16	Best National Costume (Top 5)	Before winning Puteri Indonesia 2013, Whulandary won the Asian Top Model of the Year 2010 in Hangzhou, China.
2012	Central Java	Maria Selena Nurcahya	Puteri Indonesia 2011	Unplaced	Best National Costume (Top 10)	
2011	Jakarta SCR	Nadine Alexandra Dewi Ames	Puteri Indonesia 2010	Unplaced		
2010	Aceh	Qory Sandioriva	Puteri Indonesia 2009	Unplaced		
2009	Jakarta SCR	Zivanna Letisha Siregar	Puteri Indonesia 2008	Unplaced		Won Best Popularity Vote via Miss Universe Website but this voting was for fun challenge not for special awards
2008	East Java	Gracia Putri Raemawasti Mulyono	Puteri Indonesia 2007	Unplaced		
2007	Central Java	Agni Pratistha Arkadewi Kuswardono	Puteri Indonesia 2006	Unplaced		
2006	Jakarta SCR	Nadine Chandrawinata	Puteri Indonesia 2005	Unplaced		
2005	Bangka Belitung	Artika Sari Devi Kusmayadi	Puteri Indonesia 2004	Top 15		
Did not compete between 1997—2004: Abstained from competing because of Indonesian government's issues prohibition beauty pageants.
1996	Jakarta SCR	Alya Rohali	Puteri Indonesia 1996	Unplaced		
1995	Maluku	Susanty Priscilla Adresina Manuhutu	Puteri Indonesia 1995	Unplaced		
Did not compete between 1984—1994: Abstained from competing because of Indonesian government's prohibition of beauty pageants.
Andi Beauty Institute Jakarta / Andy Nurhayati directorship — a franchise holder to Miss Universe between 1974 and 1983
1983	South Sulawesi	Andi Botenri	Miss Universe Indonesia 1983	Unplaced		In 1982, Andi was one the 5 winners at Miss Indonesia 1982, as Miss World Indonesia. She competed at Miss World 1982 and was designated as Miss Universe Indonesia 1983 by Andi Beauty Institute Jakarta (as the national holder for Indonesia).
1982	East Java	Sri Yulianti Soemardjo	Miss Universe Indonesia 1982	Unplaced	Swimsuit Score (71st) recorded by Miss Universe Incorporation LIVE program	In 1982, there are 5 winners who scheduled to represent Indonesia at international pageants. Sri was the main winner who represented Indonesia at Miss Universe 1982. She titled as Miss Universe Indonesia 1982, together with other titleholders.
1980	South Sulawesi	Andi Nana Riwayatie Basoamier	Appointed	Unplaced	Swimsuit Score (57th) recorded by Miss Universe Incorporation LIVE program	Nana was appointed to represent Indonesia at the Miss Universe from closed election.
Did not compete between 1978—1979: There is complete disagreement about Indonesia's delivery of beauty events from the government.
1977	South Sumatera	Siti Mirza Nuria Arifin	Puteri Indonesia 1977	Unplaced		Winning Puteri Indonesia 1977, Siti was designated as Miss Universe Indonesia 1977.
1976	West Java	Yayu Yuliarti Rahayu	Puteri Indonesia 1976	Unplaced		
1975	Jakarta SCR	Lydia Arlini Wahab	Ratu Indonesia 1973	Unplaced		The Ratu Indonesia 1973 — winner who also represented Indonesia at Miss Asia Pacific 1974, Queen of the Pacific 1974, and Miss International 1974 before competing at Miss Universe 1975.
1974	West Java	Nia Kurniasih Ardikoesoema	Miss Indonesia (Ratu Pariwisata Indonesia) 1973	Unplaced		She was crowned Ratu Pariwisata Indonesia 1973 and has the rights to represent Indonesia to Miss Universe. Nia competed at Ratu Indonesia pageant, represented Jawa Barat at the pageant and won Miss Congeniality award.

=== Number of wins by province ===
Province	Titles	Year(s)
Jakarta SCR	8	1975, 1996, 2006, 2009, 2011, 2017, 2019, 2023
East Java	4	1982, 2008, 2014, 2020
Central Java	3	2007, 2012, 2015
(Bangka Belitung Islands) Bangka Belitung	2	2005, 2018
South Sulawesi	2	1980, 1983
West Java	2	1974, 1976
Bali	2	2022, 2025
Banten	1	2024
North Sulawesi	1	2016
West Sumatra	1	2013
Aceh	1	2010
(Maluku (province)) Maluku	1	1995
South Sumatra	1	1977

=== Unsuccessful attempt ===
Year	Province	Miss Universe Indonesia	National pageant	Placement at Miss Universe	Special awards	Notes
1994	Jakarta SCR	Vena Melinda	Puteri Indonesia 1994	Did not compete		Came as an observer
1993	Jakarta SCR	Indira Sudiro	Puteri Indonesia 1992	Did not compete		Withdrew during competition
1981	Jakarta SCR	Roosje Soeratman	Gadis Teladan 1981	Did not compete		Roosje

== Gallery of titleholders ==
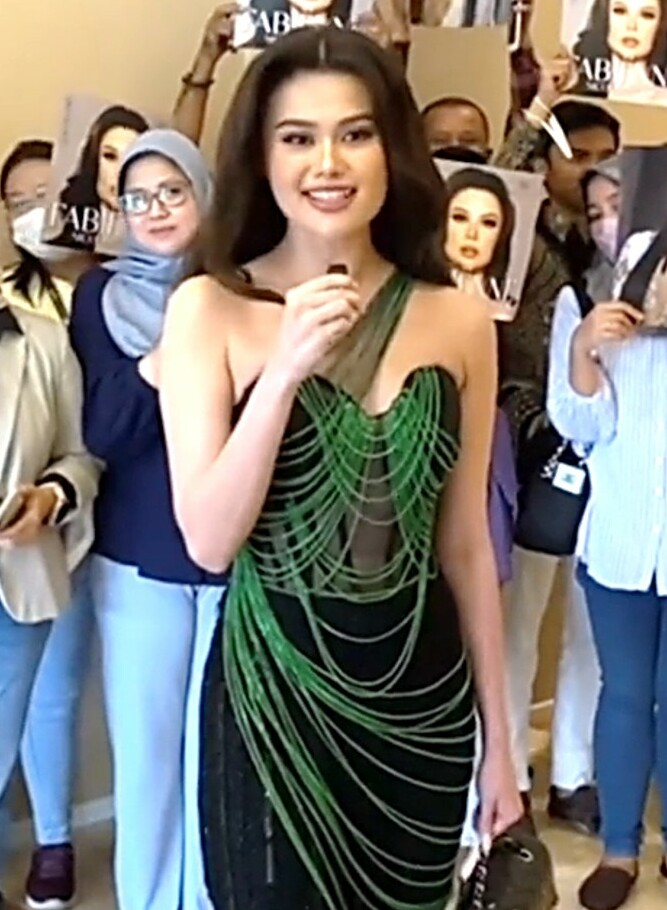
Miss Universe Indonesia 2023
Fabiënne Nicole Groeneveld
Jakarta SCR

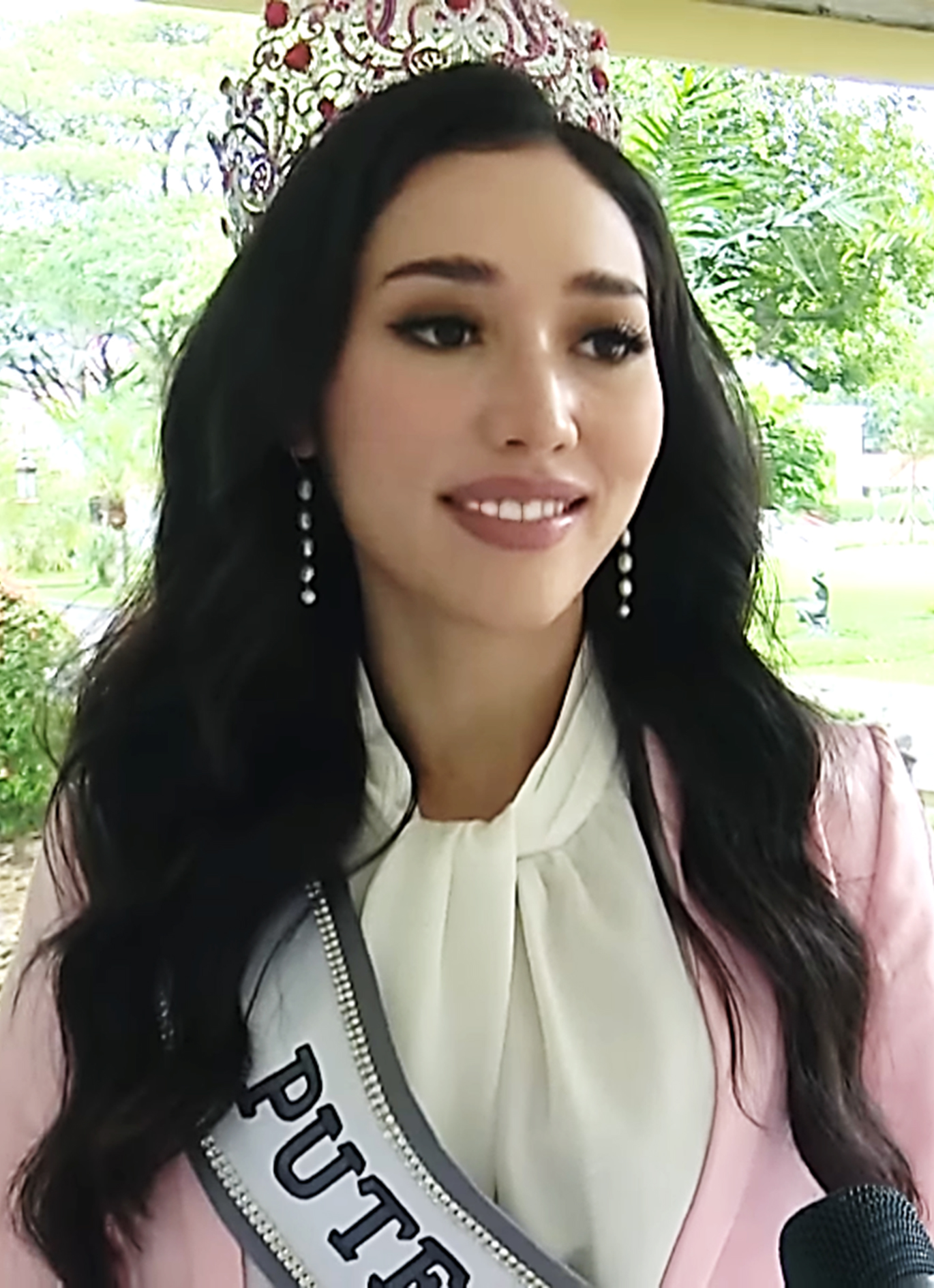
Miss Universe Indonesia 2022
Laksmi Shari De-Neefe Suardana
Bali

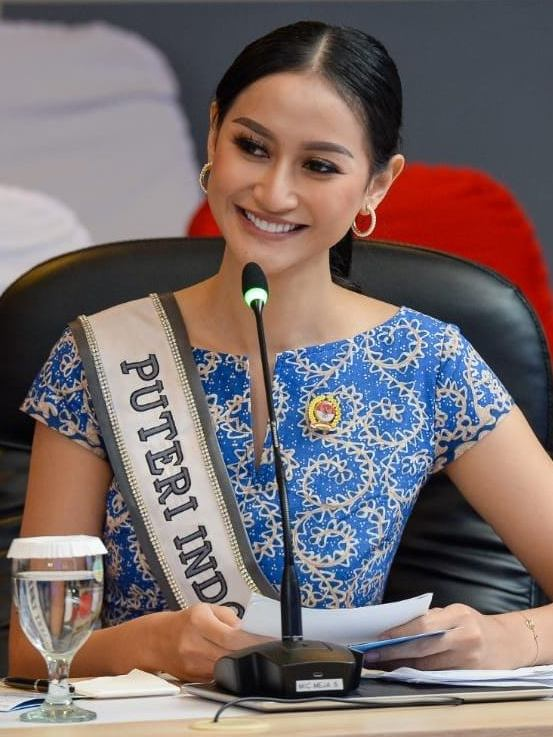
Miss Universe Indonesia 2020
Raden Roro Ayu Maulida Putri
East Java

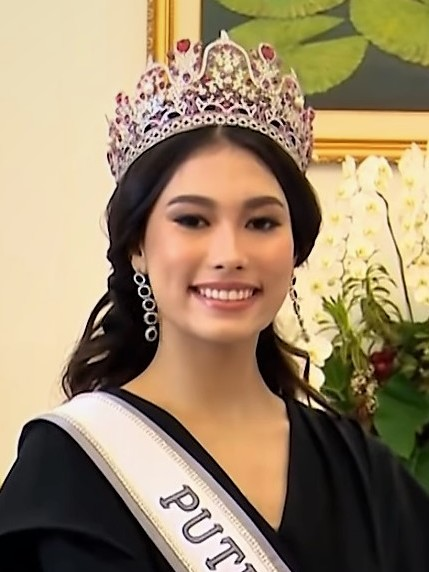
Miss Universe Indonesia 2019
Frederika Alexis Cull
Jakarta SCR

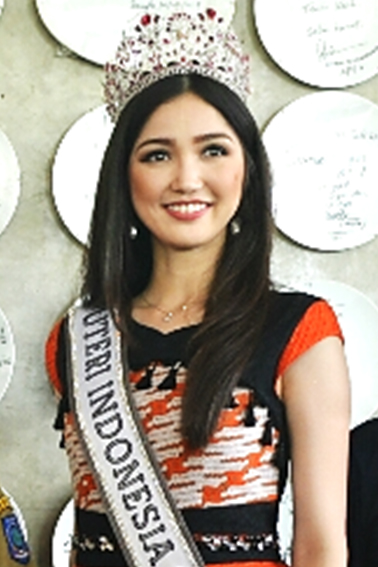
Miss Universe Indonesia 2018
Sonia Fergina Citra
Bangka Belitung

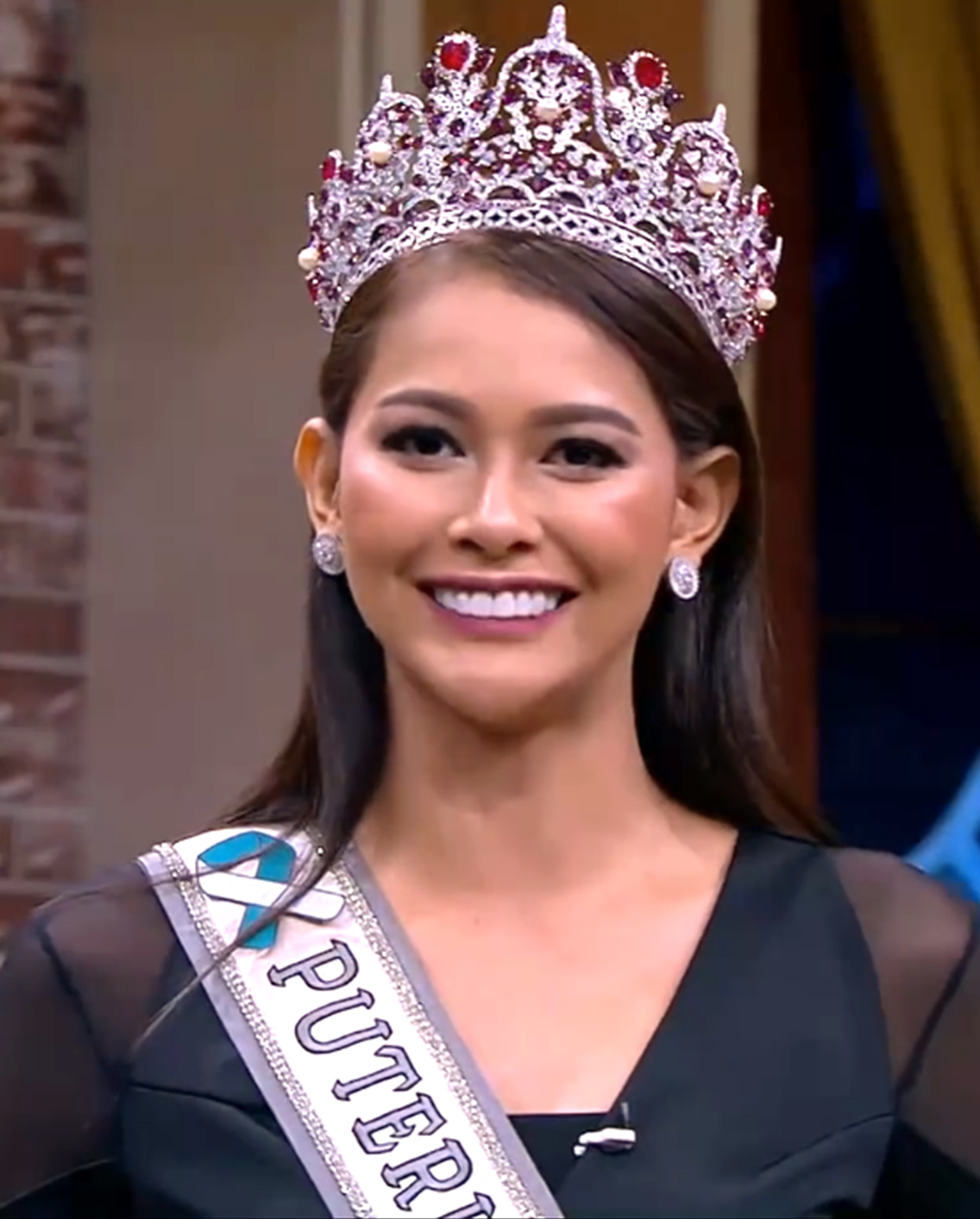
Miss Universe Indonesia 2017
Bunga Jelitha Ibrani
Jakarta SCR

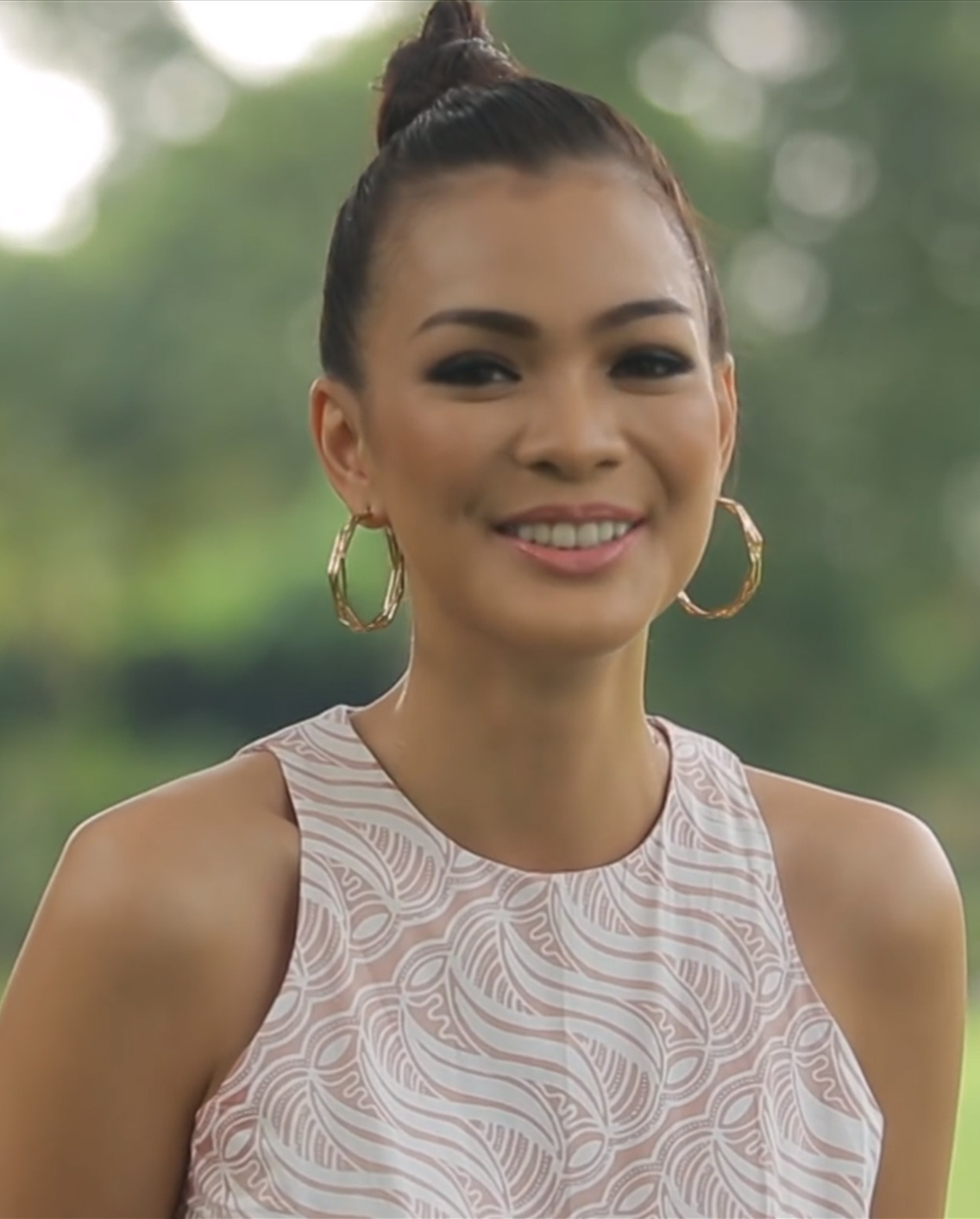
Miss Universe Indonesia 2016
Kezia Roslin Cikita Warouw
North Sulawesi

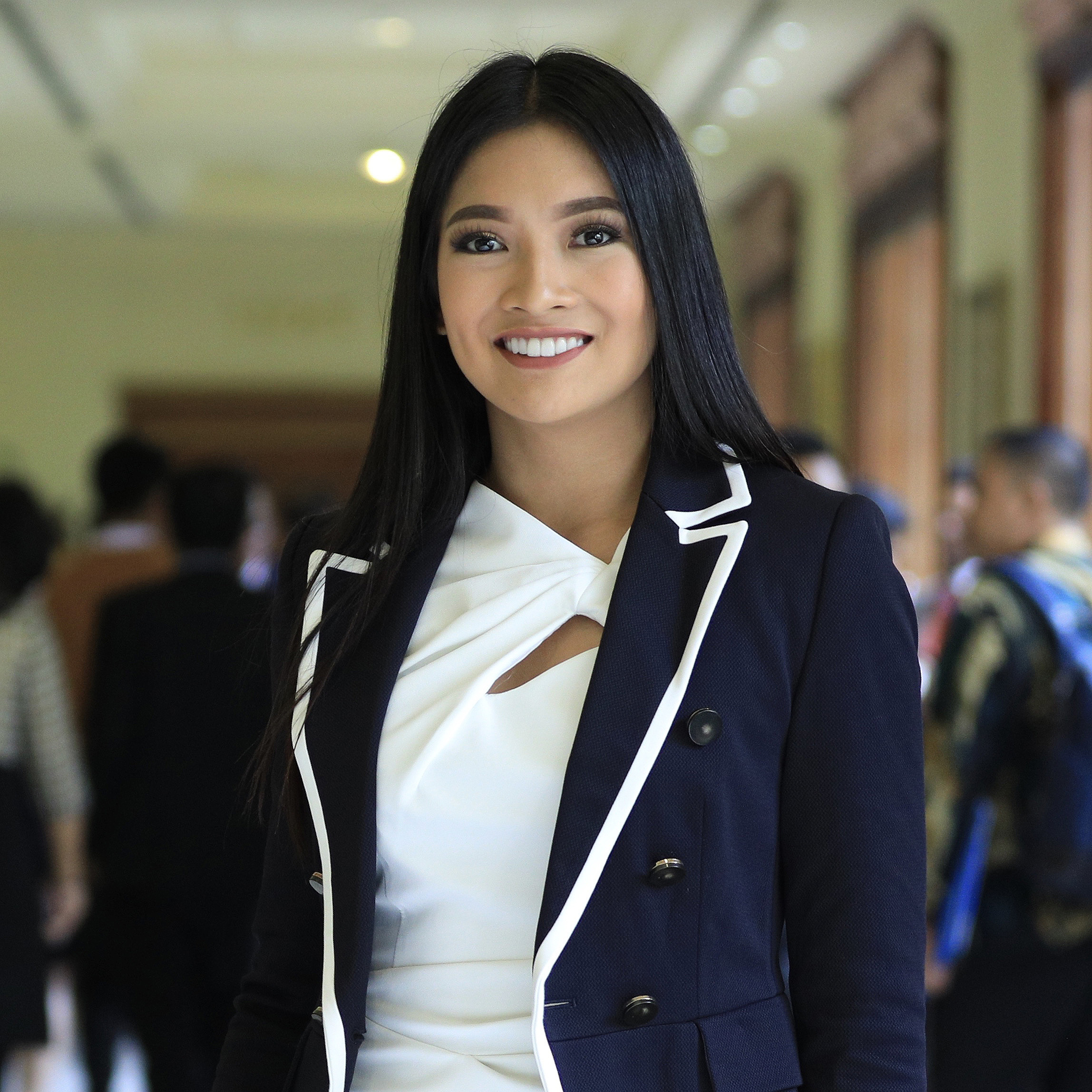
Miss Universe Indonesia 2015
Anindya Kusuma Putri
Central Java

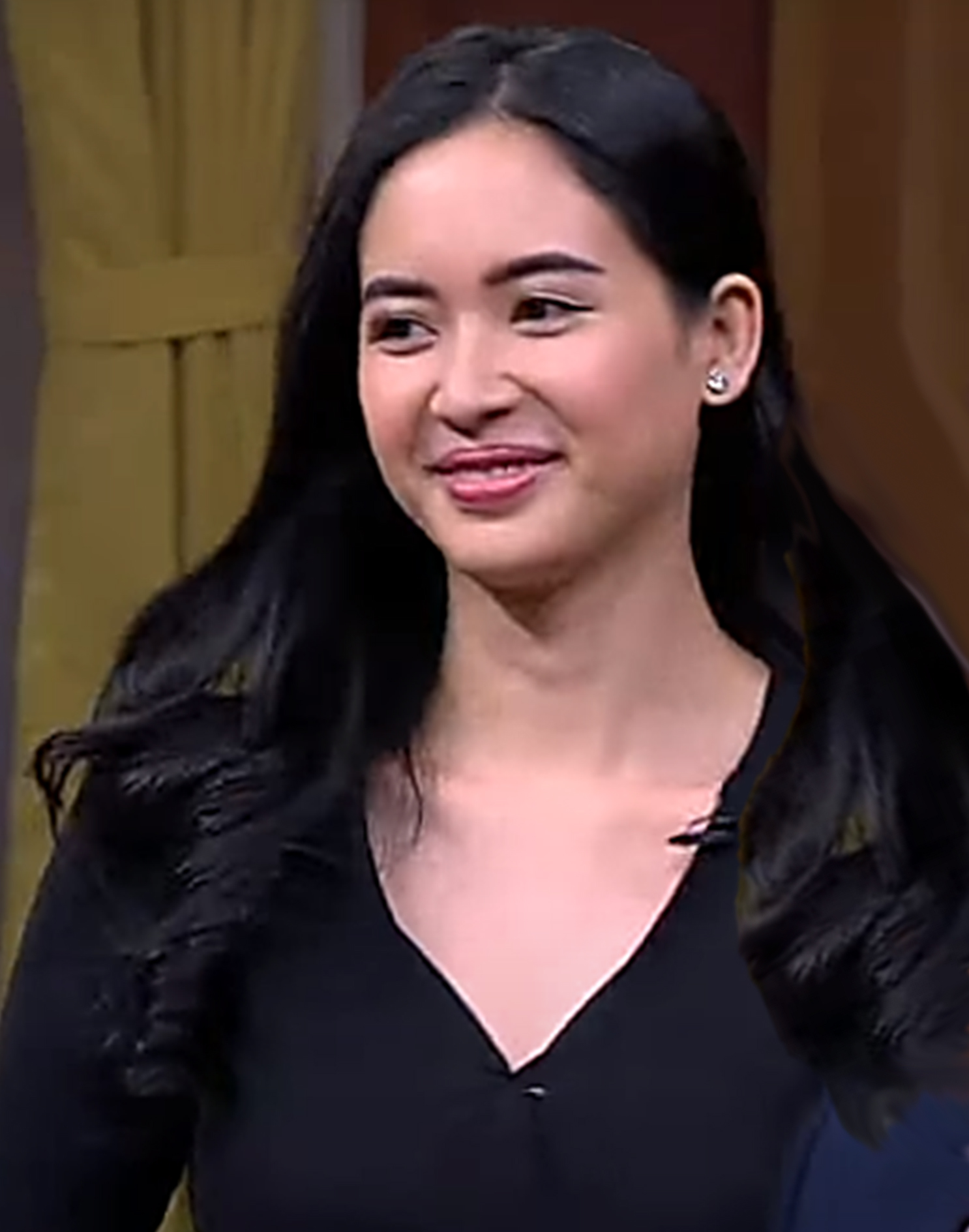
Miss Universe Indonesia 2014
Elvira Devinamira Wirayanti
East Java

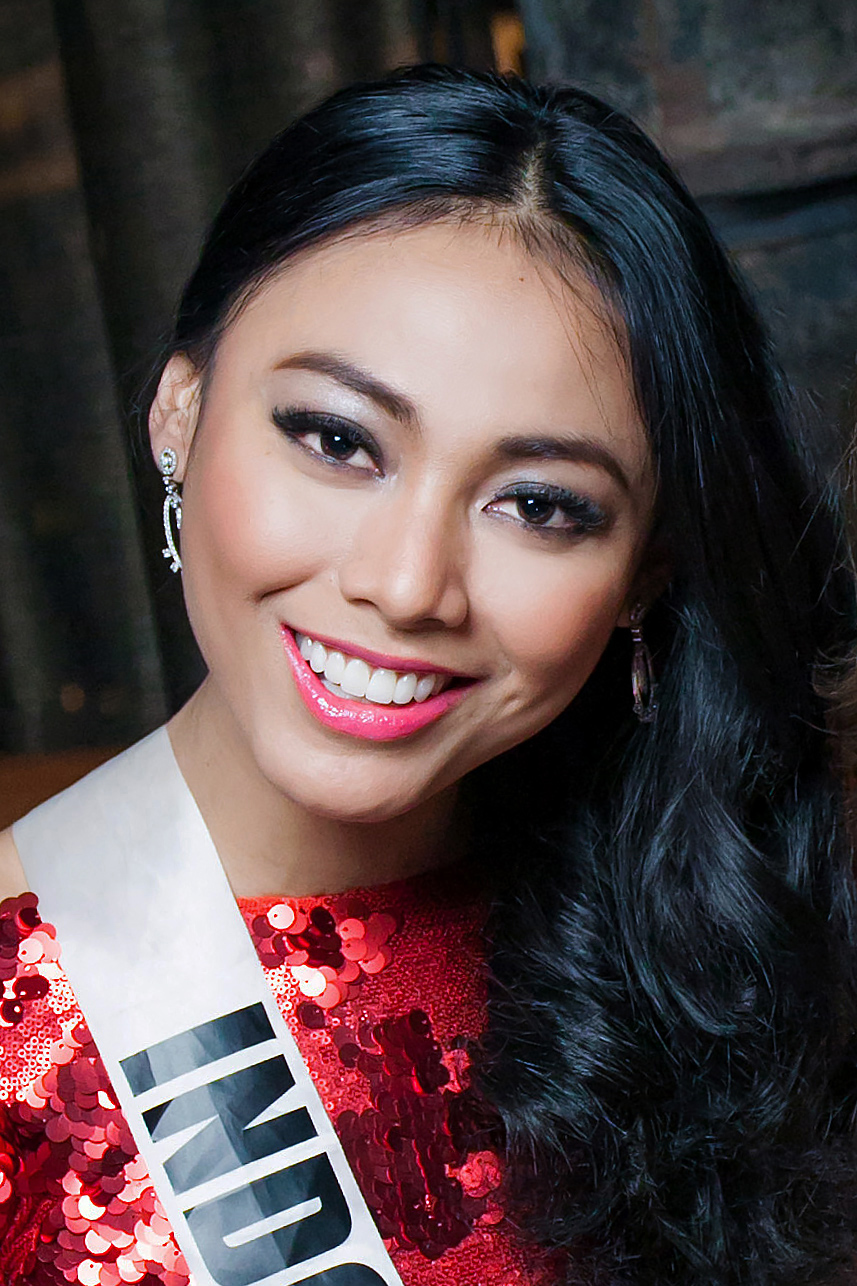
Miss Universe Indonesia 2013
Whulandary Herman
West Sumatra

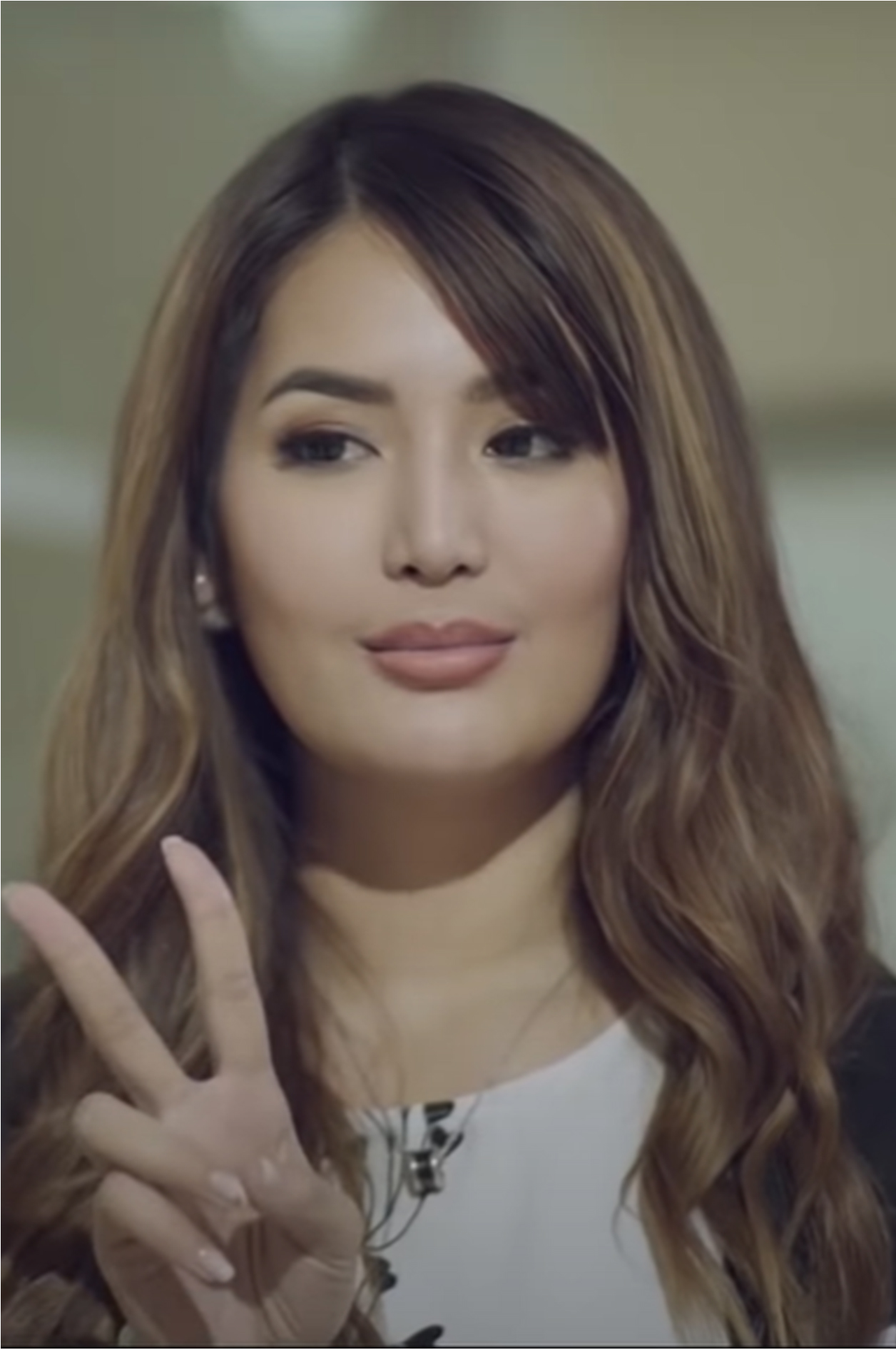
Miss Universe Indonesia 2012
Maria Selena Nurcahya
Central Java

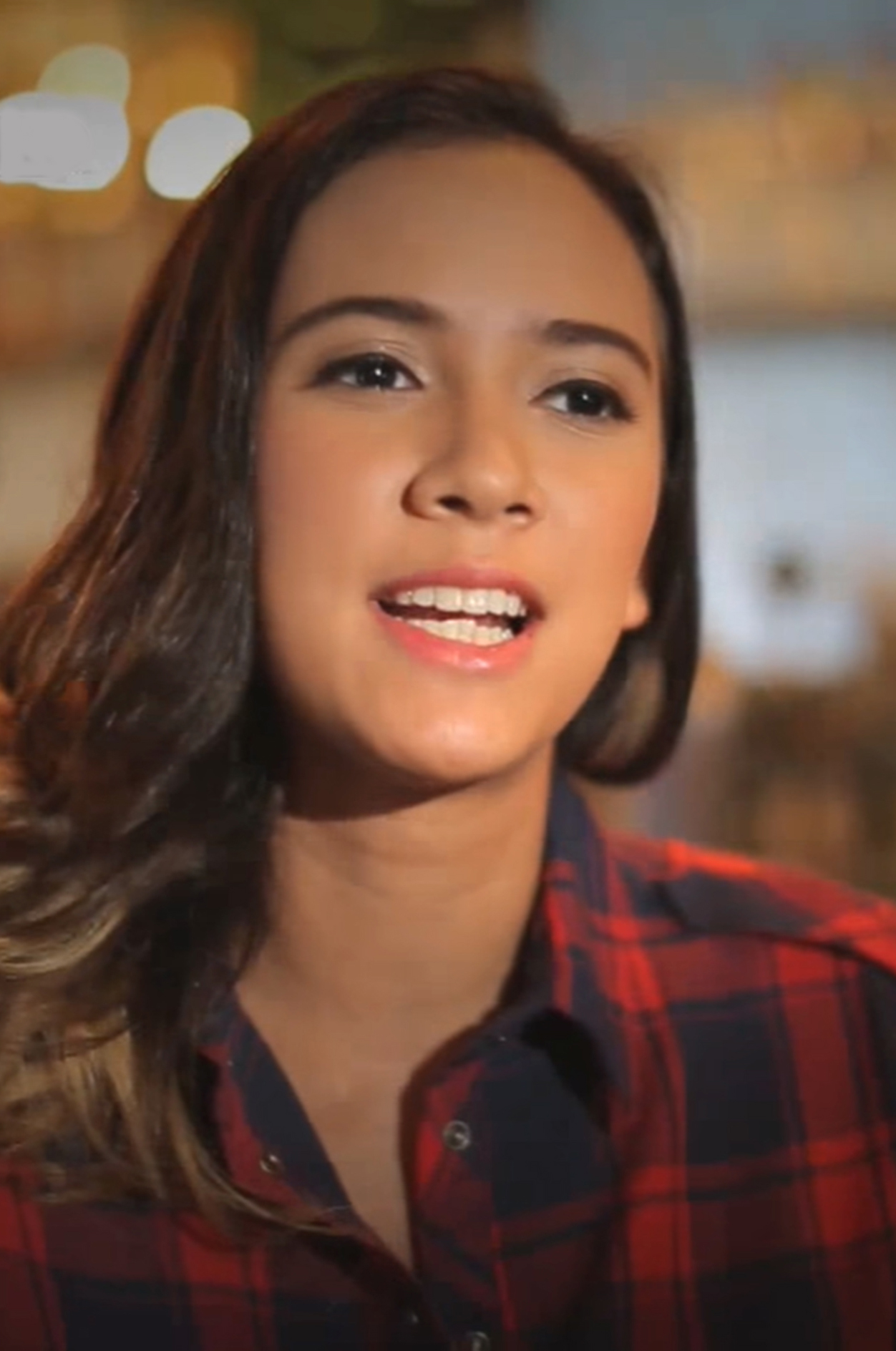
Miss Universe Indonesia 2011
Nadine Alexandra Dewi Ames
Jakarta SCR

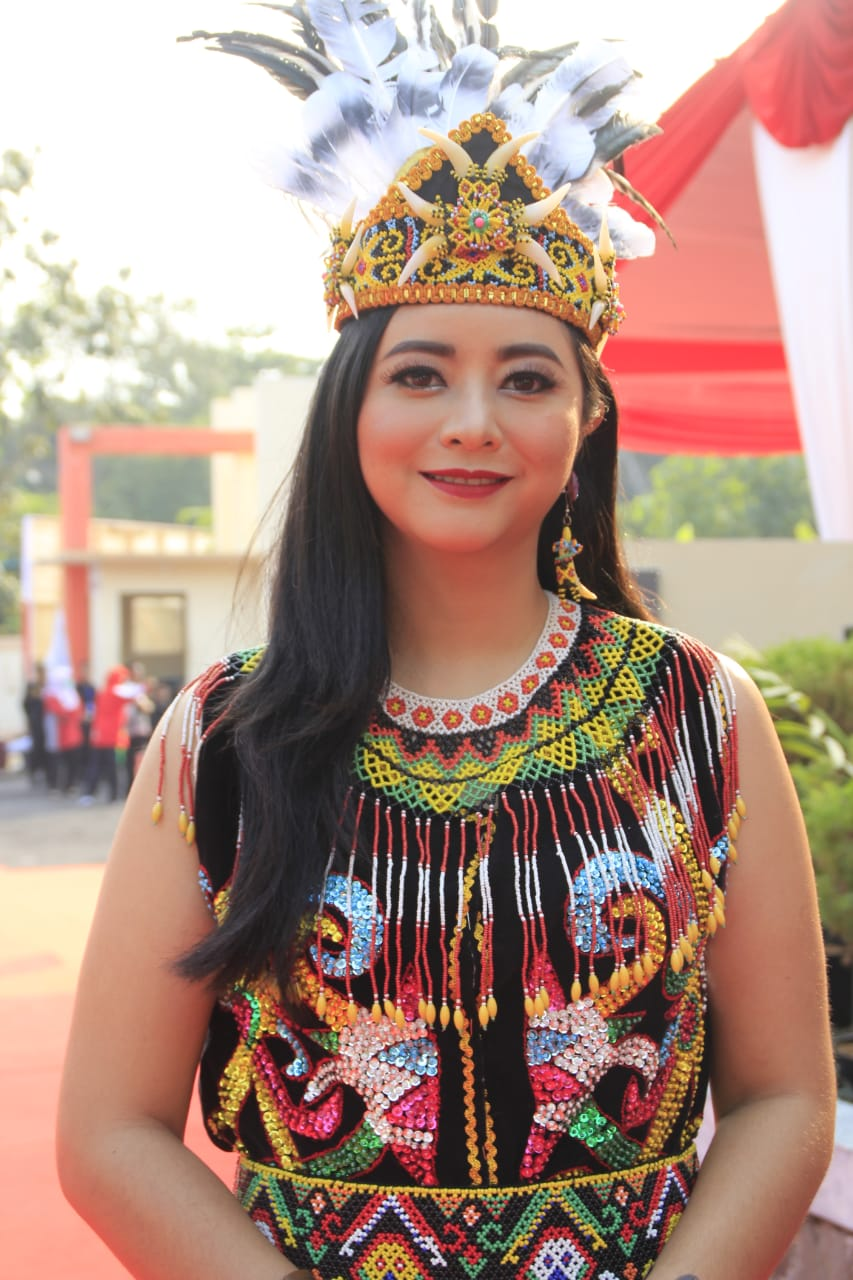
Miss Universe Indonesia 2010
Qory Sandioriva
Aceh

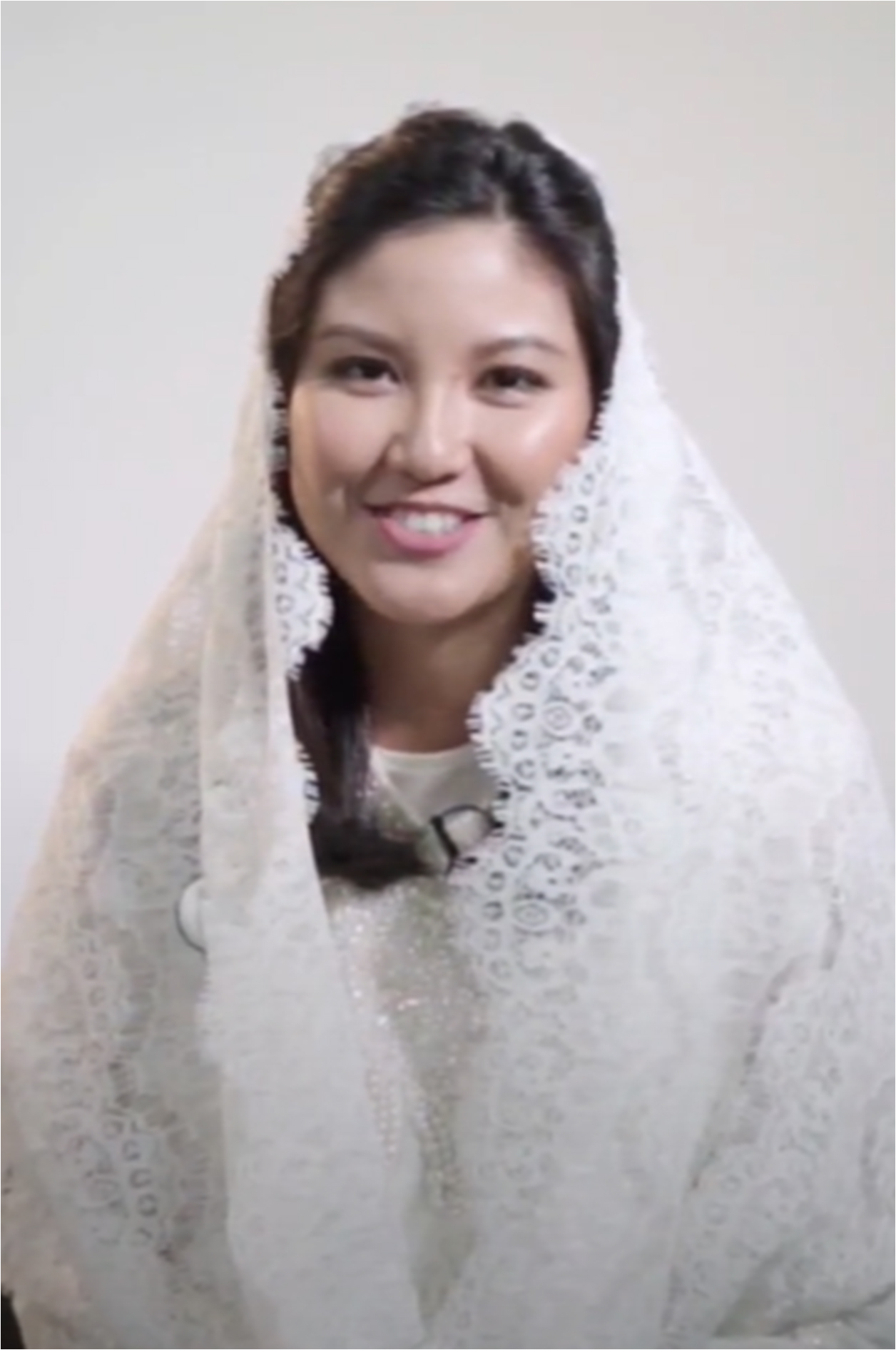
Miss Universe Indonesia 2009
Zivanna Letisha Siregar
Jakarta SCR

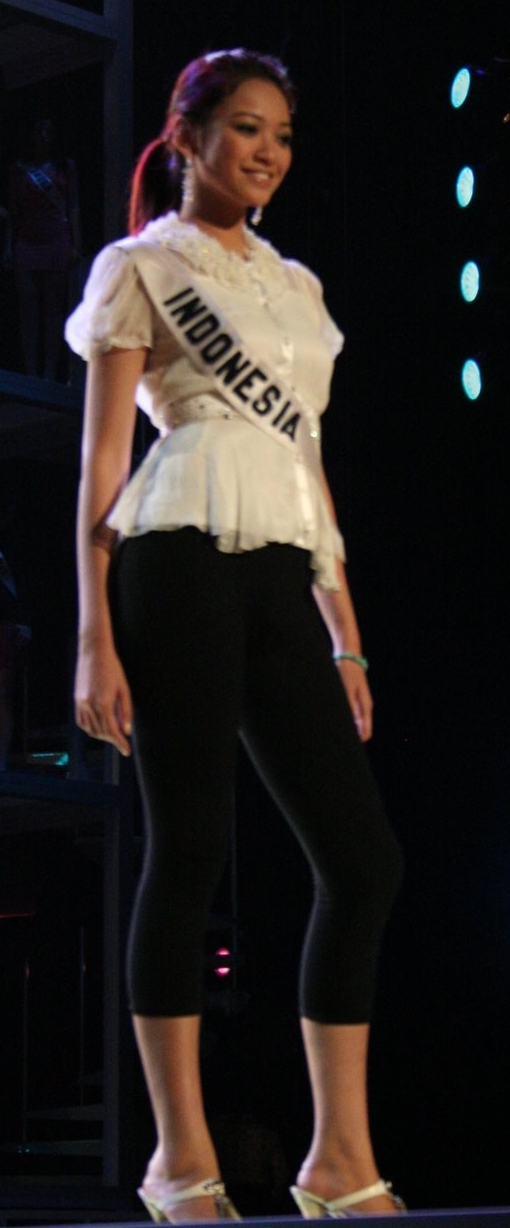
Miss Universe Indonesia 2007
Agni Pratistha Arkadewi Kuswardono
Central Java

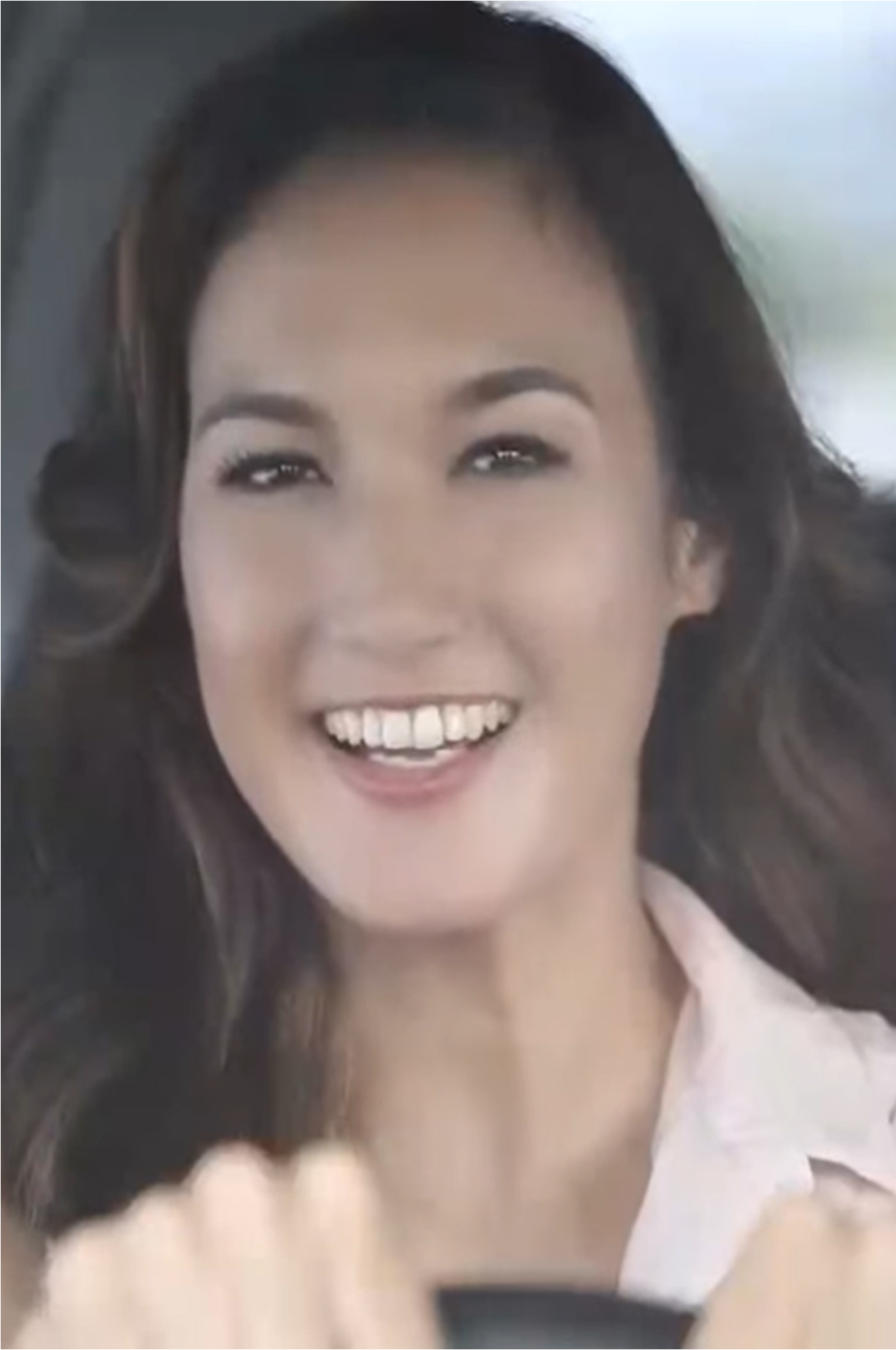
Miss Universe Indonesia 2006
Nadine Chandrawinata
Jakarta SCR

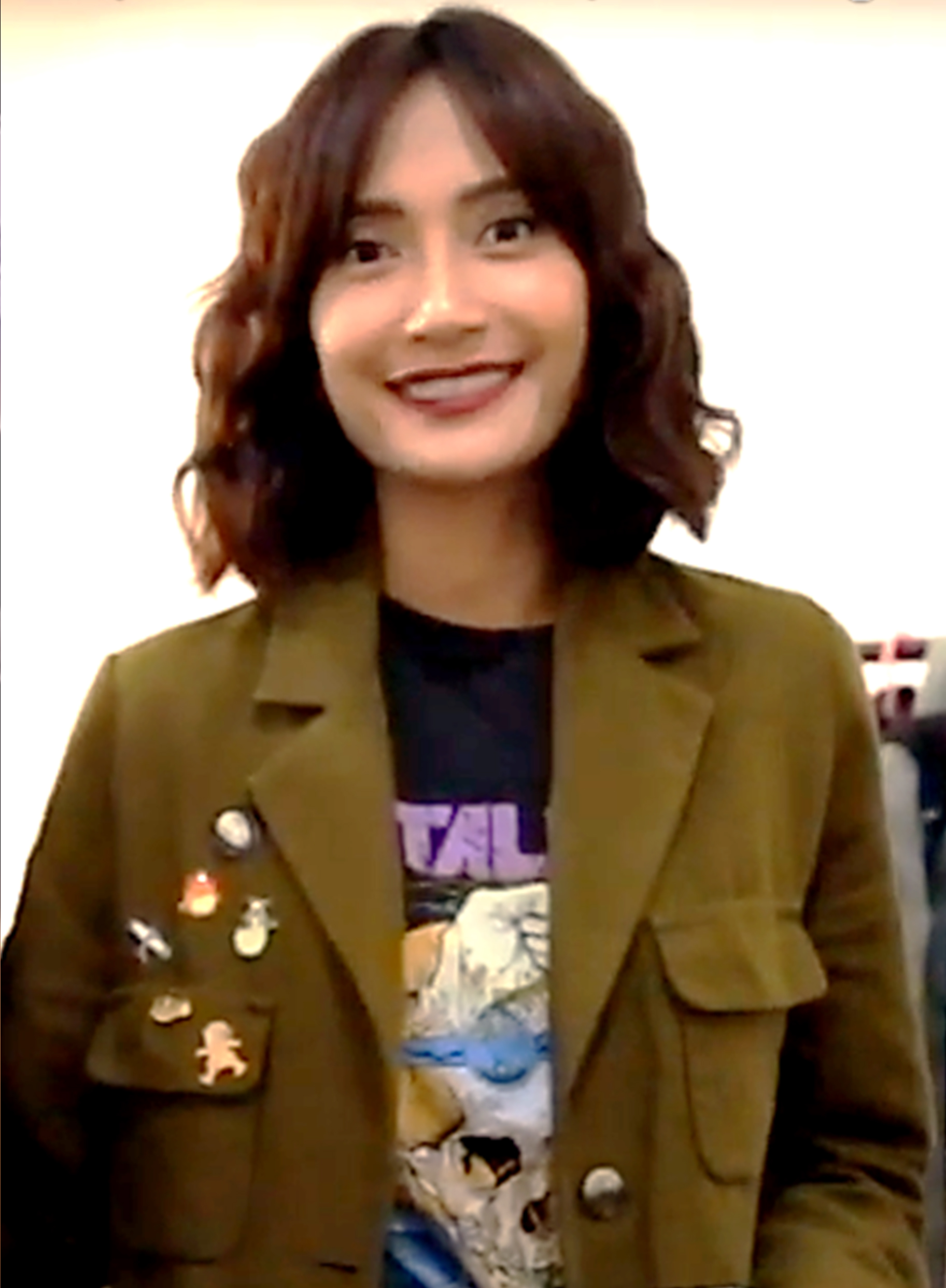
Miss Universe Indonesia 2005
Artika Sari Devi Kusmayadi
Bangka Belitung

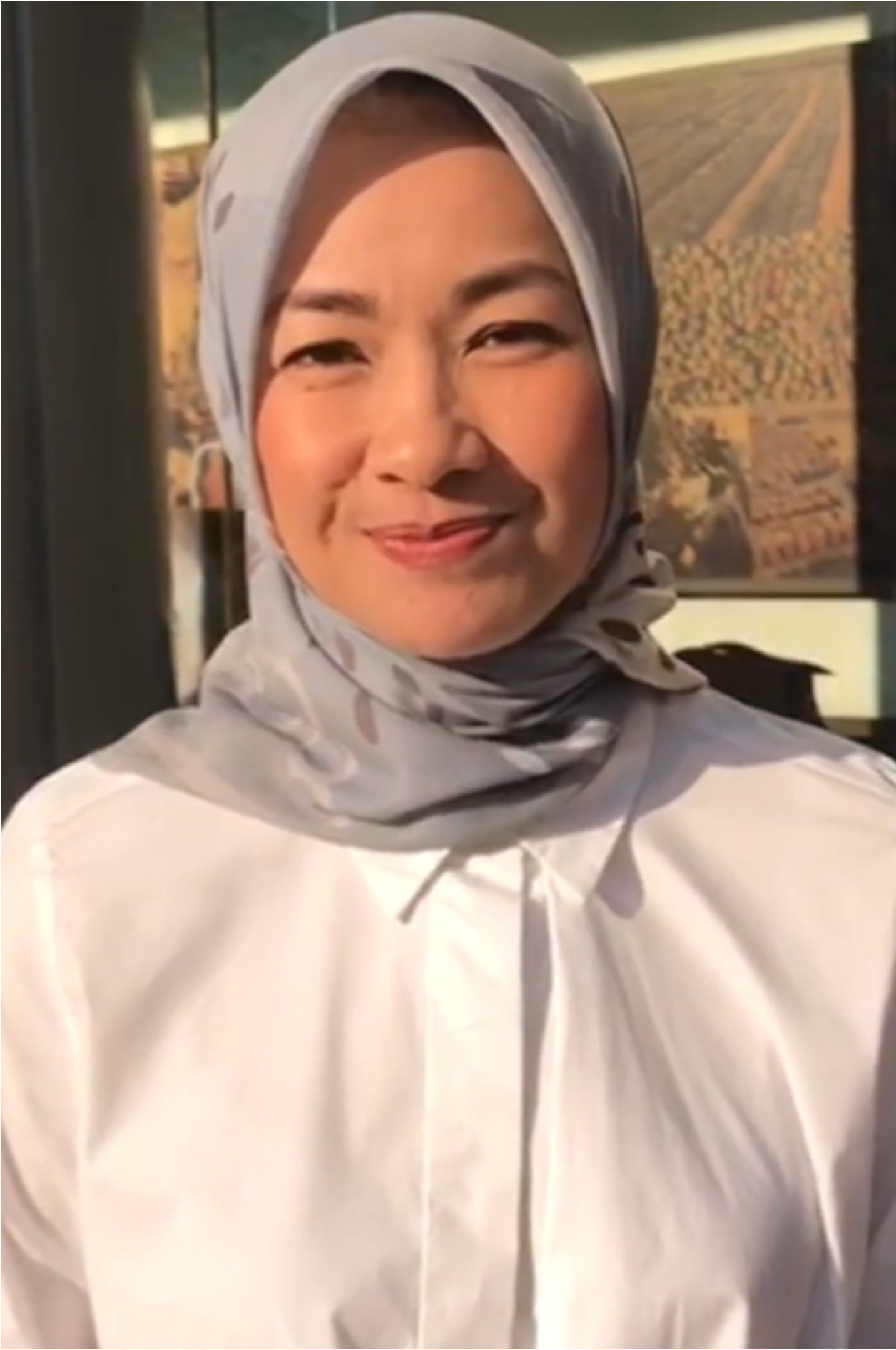
Miss Universe Indonesia 1996
Alya Rohali
Jakarta SCR

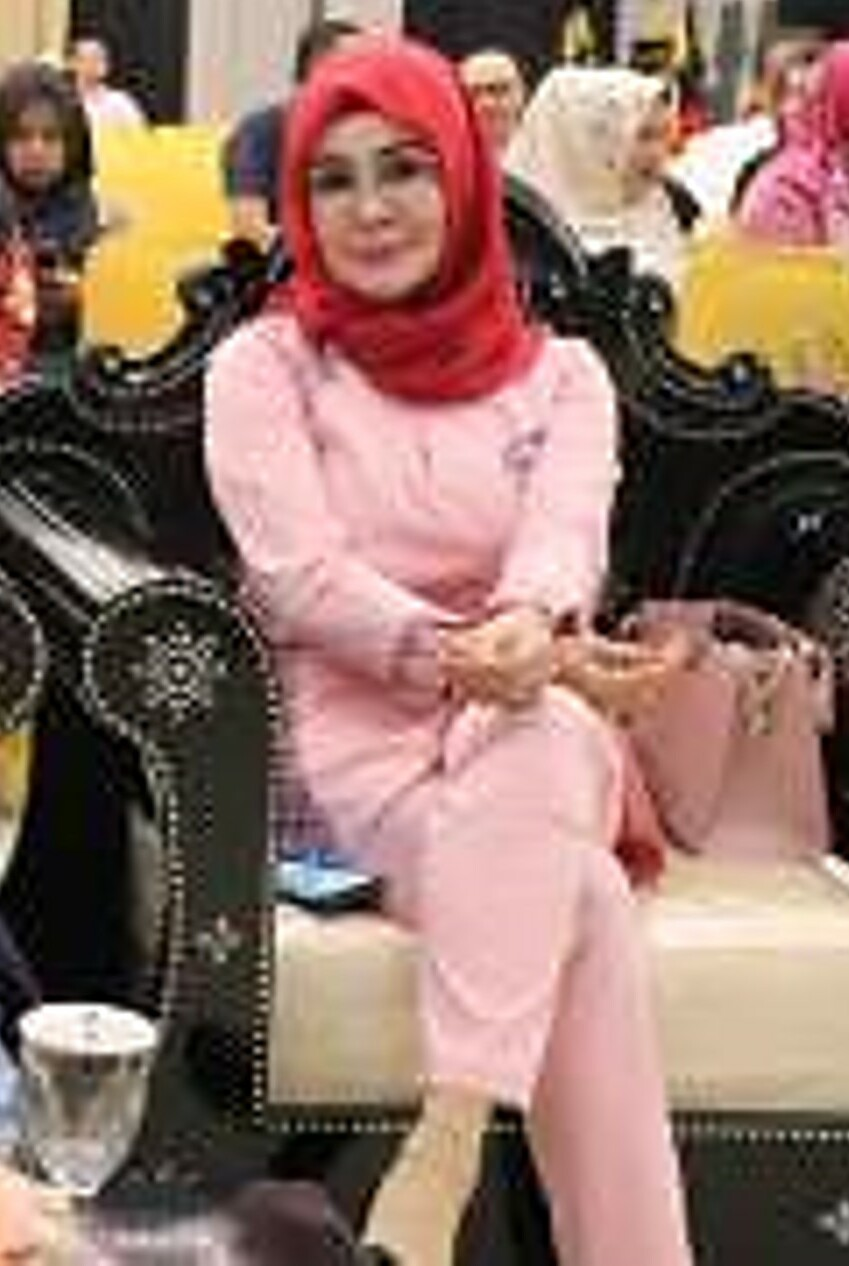
Miss Universe Indonesia 1982
Sri Yulianti Soemardjo
East Java

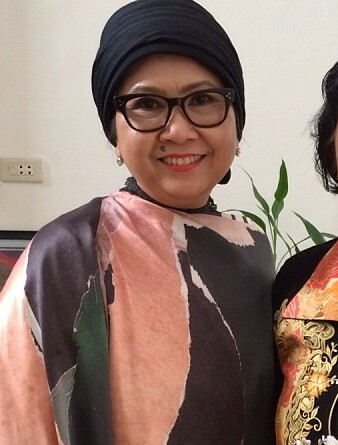
Miss Universe Indonesia 1980
Andi Nana Riwayatie Basoamier
South Sulawesi

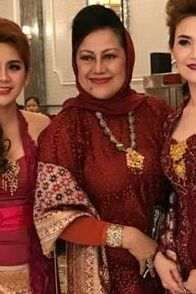
Miss Universe Indonesia 1977
Siti Mirza Nuria Arifin
South Sumatra

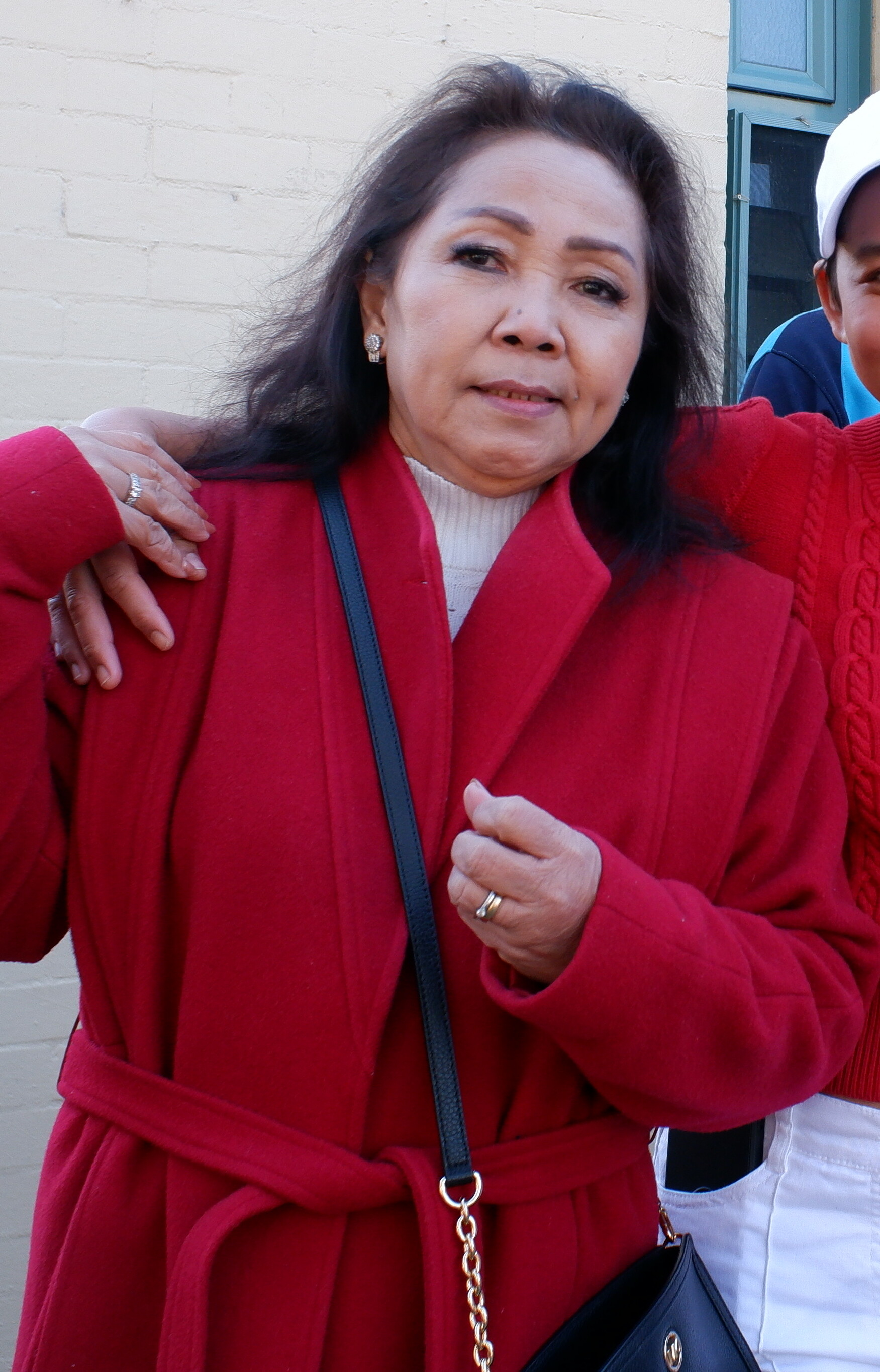
Miss Universe Indonesia 1976
Juliarti Rahayu Gunawan
Banten

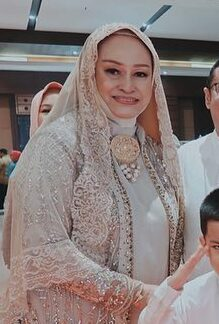
Miss Universe Indonesia 1975
Lydia Arlini Wahab
Jakarta SCR

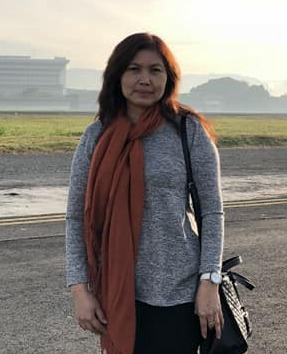
Miss Universe Indonesia 1974
Nia Kurniasih Ardikoesoema †
West Java

== See also ==
- Miss Indonesia
- Puteri Indonesia
- Putri Nusantara
- Miss Mega Bintang Indonesia
- Indonesia at major beauty pageants
- Big Four international beauty pageants
- List of beauty pageants
