= Andi Botenri =

Indonesian beauty pageant titleholder (1965–2018)

- Botenri during Miss World 1982
- Born: Andi Bau Tenri; December 21, 1965; Watampone, South Sulawesi, Indonesia
- Died: April 16, 2018 (aged 52); EMC Healthcare, Bogor, Indonesia
- Other name: Andi Botenri
- Height: 5 ft 6 in (1.68 m)
- Beauty pageant titleholder
- Title: Miss World Indonesia 1982; Miss Universe Indonesia 1983
- Hair color: Black
- Eye color: Brown
- Major competitions: Miss Asia Pacific International 1982; (Top 15); Miss World 1982; (Unplaced); Miss Universe 1983; (Unplaced)

Andi Bau Tenri (December 21, 1965 – April 16, 2018) or popularly known as Andi Botenri was an Indonesian actress, television host, model and beauty pageant titleholder who initially appointed as Miss World Indonesia 1982 and later Miss Universe Indonesia 1983, she went on to represent Indonesia and competed in both Miss World 1982 and Miss Universe 1983 respectively. Tenri became the first and the only Indonesian so far to represent Indonesia in two bigest pageant in the world, She was the second crossover candidate to accomplish this feat by representing Indonesia at two of the Big Four international beauty pageants, after the first ever Lydia Arlini Wahab in Miss International 1974 and Miss Universe 1975.

== Pageantry ==
=== Miss Asia Pacific International ===
Tenri represented Indonesia in Miss Asia Pacific International 1982 in Kuala Lumpur, Malaysia on July 15, 1982, and was the first Indonesian woman to advance to semi-finals, finished in the Top 15 (ranked no. 14). Bone Regency

=== Miss World ===
After being crowned Miss World Indonesia 1982 at the age of 17, Tenri represented Indonesia in Miss World 1982 and was the first Indonesian woman to compete in the Miss World international pageant. The pageant was held in London, United Kingdom.

=== Miss Universe ===
As the winner of Miss Universe Indonesia 1983, Tenri represent Indonesia in the Miss Universe 1983 pageant, Tenri travelled to St. Louis, Missouri, US in early of July to participate in the quarantine events, rehearsals and preliminary competitions with the other eighty delegates, but Tenri arrived ten days late after the activity started, due to visa problems and the protests she received from the Indonesian people and pressure from the government, especially from the former First Lady, Mrs. Tien Suharto who was the wife of the late second president of the Republic of Indonesia, Suharto.

== Life after pageants ==
Later in 1984, although not reported to the police, there was a controversy surrounding Tenri involvement in the Miss World 1982 and Miss Universe 1983 pageant, Tenri was accused of breaking the Code of Law 281, edict number 01/U/1984, regarding cultural and educational conducts, Indonesian law forbids any kind of involvement in international beauty pageants and considers such as immoral.

Tenri died on April 16, 2018, at EMC Healthcare, Bogor due to lung cancer.

== See also ==
- Miss Indonesia
- Miss Universe Indonesia
- Miss World 1982
- Miss Universe 1983
- Susanty Manuhutu

Awards and achievements
New title	Miss World Indonesia; 1982	Succeeded by Jakarta SCR; Titi Dwi Jayati
Preceded by East Java; Sri Yulianti Soemardjo	Miss Universe Indonesia; 1983	Succeeded by Maluku; Susanty Priscilla Adresina Manuhutu
