= Siti Mirza Nuria Arifin =

Indonesian singer, doctor, businesswomen, Miss Universe Indonesia 1977)

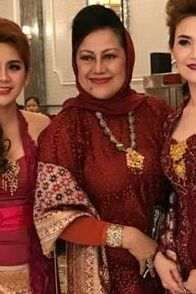
- Siti in 2022
- Born: Siti Mirza Nuria Arifin; December 30, 1953 (age 72); Palembang, South Sumatra, Indonesia
- Other name: Siti Mirza
- Education: Sriwijaya University
- Height: 5 ft 9 in (1.75 m)
- Spouse: Emyr Rasyid (m. 1978)
- Beauty pageant titleholder
- Title: Puteri Indonesia 1977; Miss Universe Indonesia 1977
- Hair color: Black
- Eye color: Brown
- Major competitions: Puteri Indonesia 1977; (Winner); Miss Universe 1977; (Unplaced)

Siti Mirza Nuria Arifin (born December 30, 1953) better known by her screen name Dr. Siti Mirza is an Indonesian obstetrics and gynaecology doctor, businesswoman, singer, model beauty pageant titleholder who initially won Puteri Indonesia 1977, she went to represents Indonesia and competed in Miss Universe 1977 in Santo Domingo, Dominican Republic.

== Early life and career ==
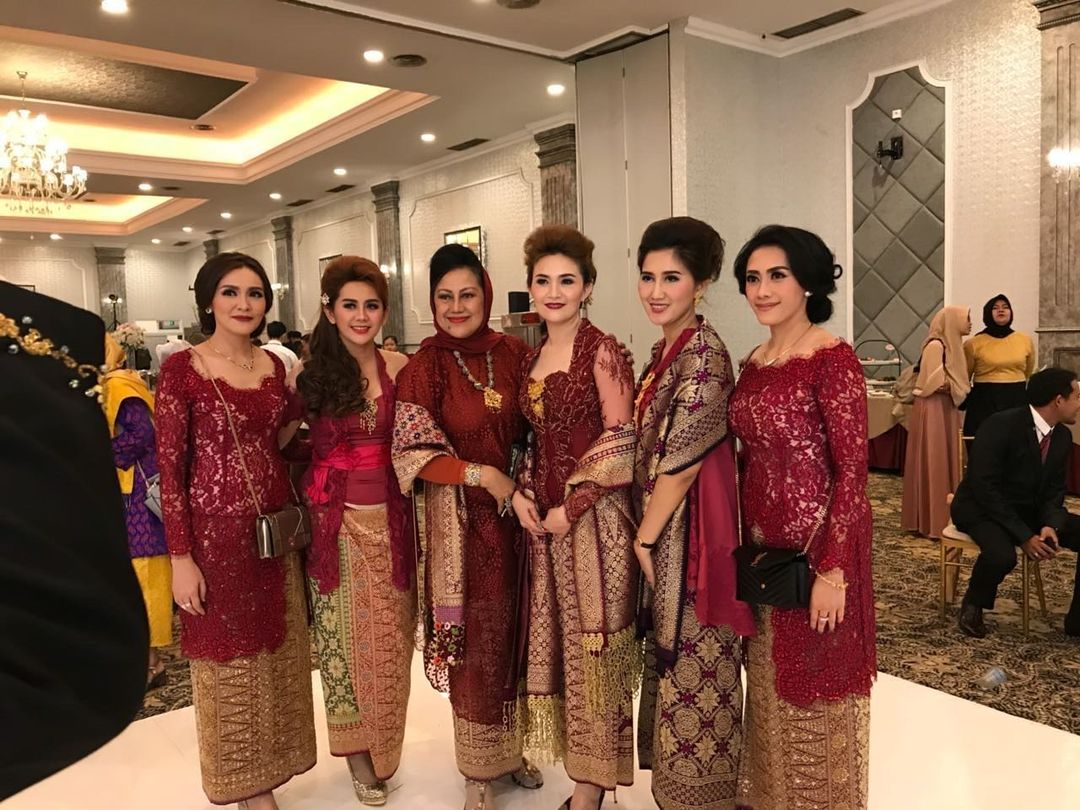
Siti (third from the left) with her family wearing Kebaya and Songket in November 2022.

Siti was born on December 30, 1953, to a Palembangese father, Zainal Arifin Zen and a Palembangese mother, Halimah Nuria. Siti earned her master's degree in Doctor of Obstetrics and Gynaecology from Sriwijaya University in Palembang, South Sumatra, and she currently work as a Obstetrician and Gynaecologist in RSIA Siti Khadijah Palembang and a lecture in Sriwijaya University. Siti is a Polyglot, She fluently speaks Indonesian, English, German, Dutch and French, and this is what public speaking has become her capital and has always brought Siti to become a champion in the women's beauty pageant, she said.

In 1978, a year after competing in Miss Universe 1977, Siti married with Dr. Emyr Rasyid, a doctor and vocalist on "Country Road", an Indonesian 80's music group specializing in country music led by Tantowi Yahya, who previously served as the Indonesian Ambassador to New Zealand and South Pacific countries. Once a week, Siti takes part as a singer who is part of the music group and appears on TVRI every weekend. On 19 September 2020, Siti husband, Dr. Emyr Rasyid died due to heart attack in Central General Hospital Dr. Mohammad Hoesin, Palembang, South Sumatra.

On 3 August 2021, as previously reported, Siti Mirza Nuria Arifin was often called by Doctor Nur. She reported Akidi Tio's youngest child, Heriyanti, to the police regarding cases of fraud and embezzlement. The report was made at the South Sumatra Regional Police SPKT on August 3, 2021, with Case Number; "LP/B/704/VIII/2021/SPKT/South Sumatra Police", where as much as 2 trillion rupiah (equal to USD134.000.000) belonging to Siti was not returned after being borrowed by Heriyanti. This problem also eventually dragged the Singapore Police Intelligence Department (PID) because of the embezzlement of money in several Singapore banks committed by Heriyanti.

== Pageantry ==
=== Miss World ===
Before Siti competed in Miss Universe 1977, she supposedly represented Indonesia at Miss World 1977 in London, for the nation's first debut in the Miss World event. However the Ministry of Foreign Affairs of the Republic of Indonesia in Jakarta announced that Indonesia had decided to withdraw from participating in the Miss World 1977 competition, due to protests over the presence of the "white Miss South Africa", 20-year-old Vanessa Wannenburg.

=== Miss Universe ===
As the winner of Miss Universe Indonesia 1977, at the age of 24, Siti represent Indonesia in the Miss Universe 1977 pageant, She travelled to Santo Domingo, Dominican Republic, she became the fourth Indonesian and the first Sumatran to ever competed in Miss Universe pageant. At the end of the finale, she is not making into the semi-finalist round, but she is placed as one of the "Top 20 in Best in National Costume", out of 80 contestants.

== See also ==
- Miss Universe Indonesia
- Miss Universe 1977

Awards and achievements
Preceded by Banten; Juliarti Rahayu Gunawan	Miss Universe Indonesia; 1977	Succeeded by South Sulawesi; Andi Nana Riwayatie Basoamier
