= Tersanjung the Movie =

2021 Indonesian film

- Directed by: Pandu Adjisurya; Hanung Bramantyo; Nur Jihat Hisyam
- Written by: Hanung Bramantyo; Pandu Adjisurya
- Starring: Clara Bernadeth; Giorgino Abraham; Kevin Ardillova
- Production companies: MVP Pictures; Dapur Film
- Distributed by: Netflix
- Release date: 1 April 2021
- Running time: 114 minutes
- Country: Indonesia
- Language: Indonesian

Tersanjung the Movie is a 2021 Indonesian film directed by Pandu Adjisurya, Hanung Bramantyo and Nur Jihat Hisyam, written by Hanung Bramantyo and Pandu Adjisurya and starring Clara Bernadeth, Giorgino Abraham and Kevin Ardillova.

== Cast ==
- Clara Bernadeth as Yura Diandra Hartono
- Giorgino Abraham as Christian Salim, Yura's bestfriend-turned-boyfriend
- Kevin Ardilova as Oka Saputra, Yura's bestfriend-turned-husband
- Nugie as Gerry Hartono, Yura and Nisa's father, Diandra's ex-husband, Indah's husband
- Kinaryosih as Indah Besari, Yura's stepmother, Nisa's mother, Gerry's second wife
- Alya Rohali as Nisa, Gerry and Indah's daughter, Yura's half-sister
- Ernanto Kusuma as Somad, Michelle's wife, Oka's father
- Sacha Stevenson as Michelle, Somad's husband, Oka's mother
- Febby Febiola as Rachel, Christian's mother, Salim's wife
- Ari Wibowo as Salim, Christian's father, Rachel's husband
- Marthino Lio as Bobby Sadewo, Yura's ex-fiancé
- Djenar Maesa Ayu as Mrs. Sadewo, Bobby's mother
- Enditha as Diandra, Yura's biological mother, Gerry's deceased wife
- Jenny Zhang as Grace, Rachel's assistant
- Bebe Gracia as Young Yura

== Release ==
It was released as a Netflix Original on April 1, 2021.
