= Nana Riwayatie =

Indonesian actress, Miss Universe Indonesia 1980

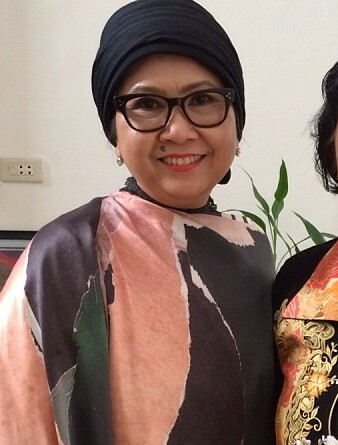
- Nana in 2014
- Born: Andi Nana Riwayatie Basoamier; October 17, 1960 (age 66); Makassar, South Sulawesi, Indonesia
- Other name: Nana Riwayatie
- Education: Trisakti University
- Height: 5 ft 8 in (1.73 m)
- Beauty pageant titleholder
- Title: Miss Universe Indonesia 1980
- Hair color: Black
- Eye color: Brown
- Major competitions: Miss Universe 1980; (Unplaced)

Andi Nana Riwayatie Basoamier (born October 17, 1960) better known by her screen name Nana Riwayatie is an Indonesian actress, businesswomen, model and beauty pageant titleholder who initially appointed as Miss Universe Indonesia 1980, she went to represents Indonesia and competed in Miss Universe 1980 in Seoul, South Korea.

== Early life and career ==
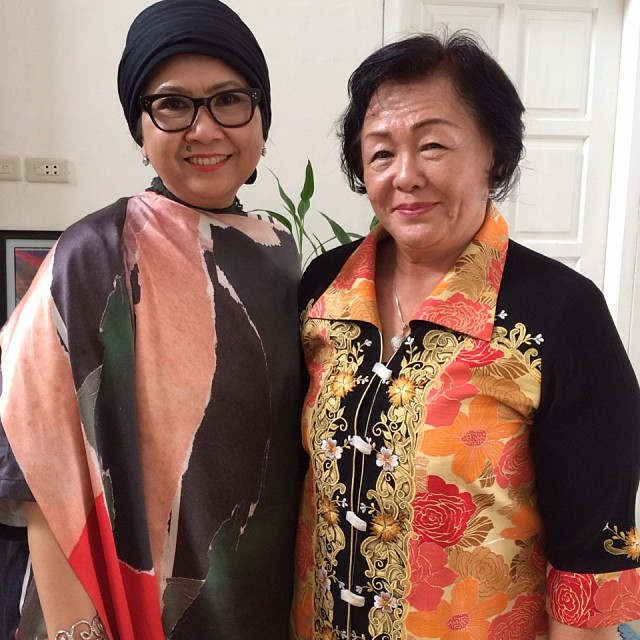
Nana (left) together with Basuki Tjahaja Purnama mother, Buniarti Ningsih.

Nana was born to a Buginese father, Haji Andi Basoamier and Makassarese mother Hajah Misribu Riwayatie, who hail from Bone state and part of Bone Sultanate family. Nana is the half sister of Indonesian politician, Basuki Tjahaja Purnama who previously served as the Governor of Jakarta. She obtain her Bachelor of Fine Arts from Trisakti University in Jakarta, Indonesia.

Growing up in a muslim conservative family, Nana decided to go for Umrah for the first time in early 1999, and since then Nana has started to wear hijab and more conservative about her clothes, these changes then reap hatred and bullies from Indonesian netizen.

On May 10, 2017, Nana led a "'Martyr of Democracy" on the streets voicing Solidarity Night for the Death of Justice, at the Taman Proklamasi Monument. This action was sparked by protests against the December 2016 Jakarta protests, which is also known as the "212 action". Nana protested the legal injustice in Indonesia against her half-brother Basuki Tjahaja Purnama, who was falsely accused of blasphemy for his speech in the Thousand Islands. Where eventually Nana's half-brother was released at the beginning of 2019, after being fully imprisoned for 2 years.

In December 2021, during the COVID-19 pandemic Nana is entrusted to become the General Chairperson of the Ministry of Micro, Small and Medium Enterprises of Indonesia for the 2021–2025 period. Nana was inspired to raise local entrepreneurs, who are producers of traditional clothes Baju Bodo, one of the oldest Indonesian traditional clothing typical of the Bugis people, most frequently worn clothing.

== Pageantry ==
=== Miss Universe ===
Nana was appointed as Miss Universe Indonesia 1980 by the license holder at that time, Andi Nurhayati. At the age of 20, Nana represented Indonesia in the Miss Universe 1980 pageant. Nana travelled to Seoul, South Korea, she became the fifth Indonesian to ever competed in Miss Universe pageant. At the end of the finale she is not making into the semi-finalist round, but she is placed on the 57th rank during the swimsuit competition, out of 69 contestants.

== Filmography ==
After returning to Indonesia, Nana received an offer to act in several films "Tiga Dara Mencari Cinta" in 1980 and "Tomboi" in 1981. Since then, Nana has acted in several film and television films in Indonesia.

=== Movies ===
Year	Title	Genre	Role	Film Production	Ref.
1980	Tiga Dara Mencari Cinta	romance film	as Nana	Gemini Satria Film	
1981	Tomboi	romance film	as Emma	Gemini Satria Film	

== See also ==
- Miss Universe Indonesia
- Miss Universe 1980

Awards and achievements
Preceded by South Sumatra; Siti Mirza Nuria Arifin	Miss Universe Indonesia; 1980	Succeeded by East Java; Sri Yulianti Soemardjo
