= Miss Universe 1983 =

32nd Miss Universe pageant

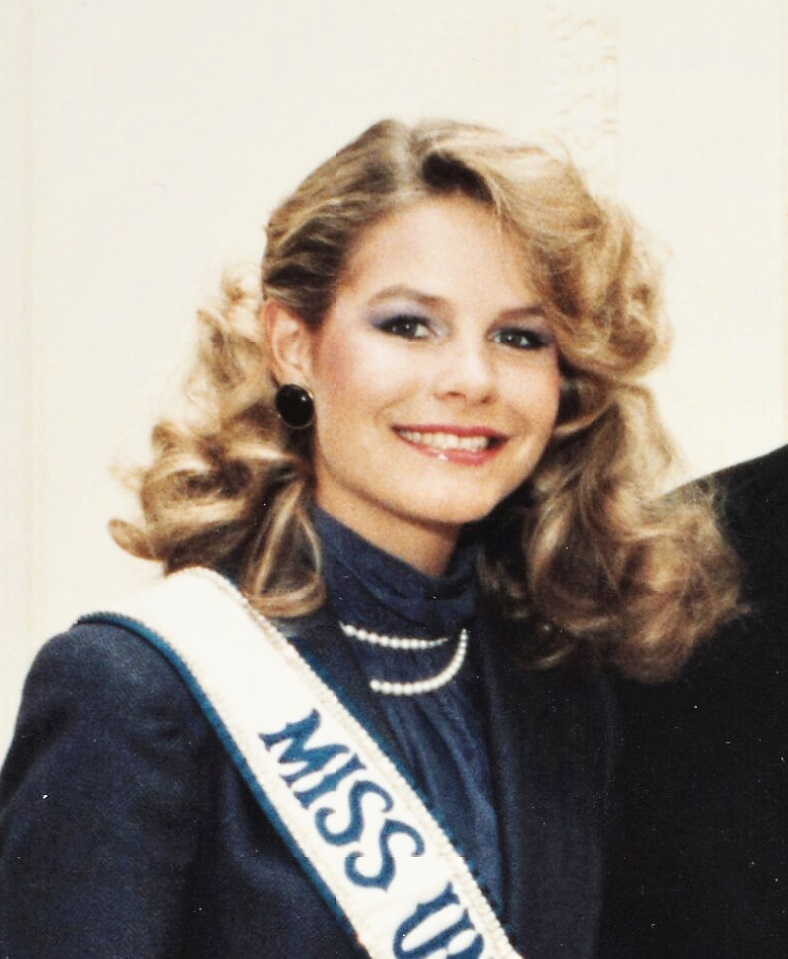
- Miss Universe 1983, Lorraine Downes
- Date: 11 July 1983
- Presenters: Bob Barker; Joan Van Ark
- Entertainment: John Schneider; José Luis Rodríguez "El Puma"
- Venue: Kiel Auditorium, St. Louis, Missouri, United States
- Broadcaster: CBS (KMOX-TV)
- Entrants: 80
- Placements: 12
- Debuts: Cook Islands; Gambia
- Withdrawals: New Caledonia; Sint Maarten; Suriname
- Returns: Cyprus; French Guiana; Gibraltar; Lebanon
- Winner: Lorraine Downes; New Zealand
- Congeniality: Abbey Scattrel Janneh; Gambia
- Best National Costume: Jong-jun Kim; South Korea
- Photogenic: Lolita Morena; Switzerland

Miss Universe 1983 was the 32nd Miss Universe pageant, held at the Kiel Auditorium in St. Louis, Missouri, United States, on 11 July 1983. At the conclusion of the event, Lorraine Downes of New Zealand was crowned by Karen Baldwin of Canada. Eighty contestants competed in this year. This is the first, and so far the only time New Zealand won the pageant.

== Results ==
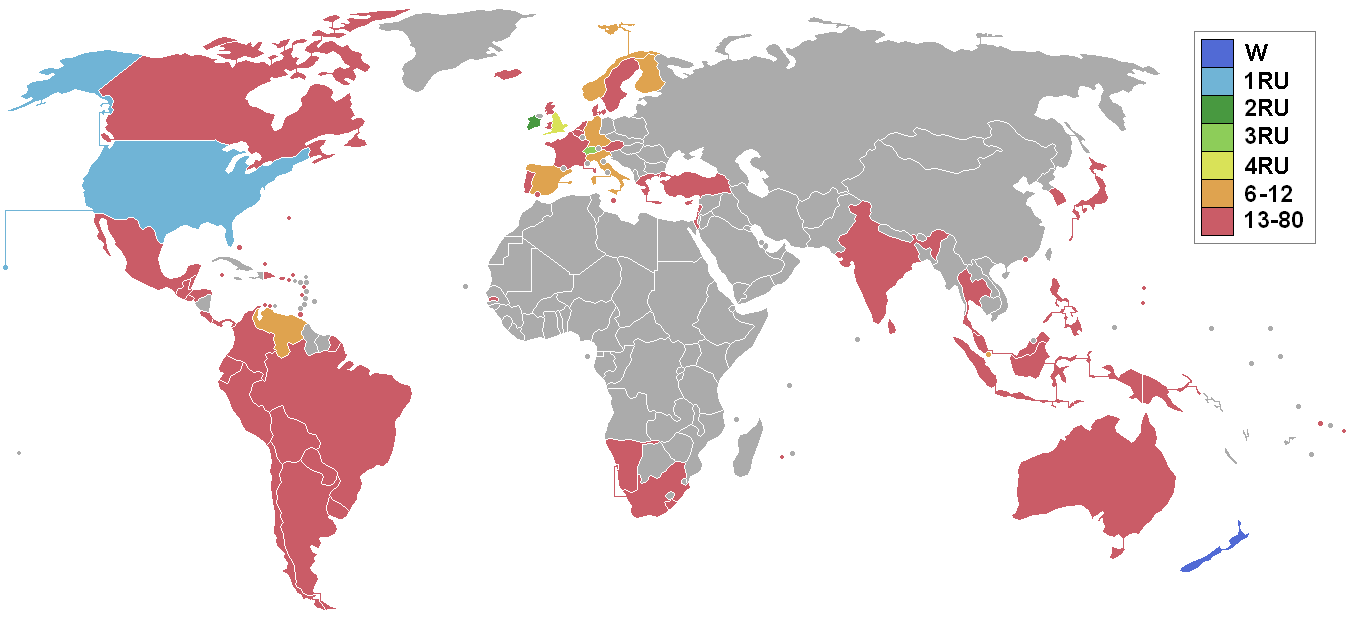
Miss Universe 1983 participating nations and results

=== Placements ===
| Placement | Contestant |
|---|---|
| Miss Universe 1983 | New Zealand – Lorraine Downes |
| 1st Runner-Up | United States – Julie Hayek |
| 2nd Runner-Up | Ireland – Roberta Brown |
| 3rd Runner-Up | Switzerland – Lolita Morena |
| 4th Runner-Up | England – Karen Moore |
| Top 12 | Finland – Nina Rekola; Italy – Federica Moro; Norway – Karen Dobloug; Singapore – Lee Lee Bang; Spain – Isabel Herrero; Venezuela – Paola Ruggeri; West Germany – Loana Radecki |

== Contestants ==
Eighty contestants competed for the title.

| Country/Territory | Contestant | Age (Note: Ages at the time of the pageant) | Hometown |
|---|---|---|---|
| Argentina | María Daniela Carara | 20 | Buenos Aires |
| Aruba | Milva Evertsz | 24 | Oranjestad |
| Australia | Simone Cox | 20 | Sydney |
| Austria | Mercedes Stermitz | 25 | Styria |
| (The Bahamas) Bahamas | Christina Thompson | 18 | Nassau |
| Belgium | Françoise Bostoen | 20 | Roeselare |
| Belize | Shirlene Dianne McKay | - | Belmopan |
| Bermuda | Angelita Diaz | 20 | St. George’s |
| Bolivia | Cecilia Zamora | - | Tarija |
| Brazil | Mariza Fully Coelho | 21 | Manhumirim |
| British Virgin Islands | Anna Maria Joseph | 19 | Tortola |
| Canada | Jodi Yvonne Rutledge | 22 | Winnipeg |
| Cayman Islands | Effie Ebanks | 18 | George Town |
| Chile | María Josefa Isensee Ugarte | 20 | Santiago |
| Colombia | Pauline Sáenz | 17 | Bogotá |
| Cook Islands | Carmena Blake | - | Avarua |
| Costa Rica | María Gabriela Pozuelo | - | San José |
| Curaçao | Maybelline Altagracia Snel | 22 | Willemstad |
| Cyprus | Marina Elena Rauscher | 18 | Limassol |
| Denmark | Inge Ravn Thomsen | 19 | Copenhagen |
| Dominican Republic | Alexandra Astwood | 17 | Santo Domingo |
| Ecuador | Mariela García | 19 | Portoviejo |
| El Salvador | Claudia Oliva | 21 | San Salvador |
| England | Karen Moore | 21 | Southsea |
| Finland | Nina Marjaana Rekkola | 20 | Nakkila |
| France | Frederique Leroy | 20 | Bordeaux |
| French Guiana | Marie Georges Achamana | - | Cayenne |
| (The Gambia) Gambia | Abbey Scattrel Janneh | 19 | Banjul |
| Gibraltar | Louise Gillingwater | 20 | Gibraltar |
| Greece | Plousia Farfaraki | 18 | Athens |
| Guadeloupe | Nicole LeBorgne | - | Basse-Terre |
| Guam | Pamela Booth | 18 | Yigo |
| Guatemala | Berta Victoria Gonzales | 20 | Escuintla |
| (Netherlands) Holland | Nancy Lelleman Heynis | 18 | Zaandam |
| Honduras | Ollie Thompson | 18 | Islas de la Bahía |
| (British Hong Kong) Hong Kong | Cherona Yeung | 19 | Hong Kong |
| Iceland | Unnur Steinsson | 20 | Álftanes |
| India | Rekha Hande | 18 | Bangalore |
| Indonesia | Andi Botenri | 18 | Jakarta |
| (Republic of Ireland) Ireland | Roberta Brown | 20 | Derry |
| Israel | Shimona Hollender | 17 | Tel Aviv |
| Italy | Federica Moro | 18 | Milan |
| Japan | Yuko Yamaguchi | 25 | Osaka |
| Lebanon | May Mansour Chahwan | 19 | Beirut |
| Malaysia | Puspa Mohammed | 21 | Alor Setar |
| Malta | Christine Bonnici | - | Sliema |
| Martinique | Marie Lina Laupa | - | Fort-de-France |
| Mexico | Monica Rosas | 19 | Durango |
| (South Africa) Namibia | Astrid Klotzsch | 22 | Windhoek |
| (New Zealand) New Zealand | Lorraine Downes | 18 | Auckland |
| Northern Mariana Islands | Thelma Mafnas | 17 | Saipan |
| Norway | Karen Elizabeth Dobloug | 21 | Furnes |
| Panama | Elizabeth Bylan Bennett | 17 | Balboa |
| Papua New Guinea | Shannelle Bray | 20 | Port Moresby |
| Paraguay | Mercedes Bosch | - | Asunción |
| Peru | Vivien Griffiths | 22 | Lima |
| Philippines | Rosita Capuyon | 20 | Manila |
| Portugal | Anabella Elisa Ananiades | - | Lisbon |
| Puerto Rico | Carmen Batiz | 18 | Trujillo Alto |
| Réunion | Eliane LeBeau | - | Saint-Denis |
| Scotland | Linda Renton | 22 | Edinburgh |
| Singapore | Kathie Lee | 20 | Singapore |
| South Africa | Leanne Hosking | 18 | Durban |
| South Korea | Kim Jong-jun | - | Seoul |
| Spain | Isabel Herrero | 18 | Zaragoza |
| Sri Lanka | Shyama Fernando | 20 | Colombo |
| Sweden | Viveca Miriam Jung | 17 | Gothenburg |
| Switzerland | Lolita Morena | 22 | Locarno |
| Thailand | Jinda Nernkrang | 22 | Bangkok |
| Transkei | Nomxousi Xokelelo | - | Mthatha |
| Trinidad and Tobago | Sandra Williams | - | Saint George |
| Turkey | Dilara Haraççı | - | Istanbul |
| Turks and Caicos Islands | Lolita Ariza | 21 | Grand Turk |
| United States | Julie Hayek | 20 | La Cañada Flintridge |
| United States Virgin Islands | Julie Elizabeth Woods | - | Charlotte Amalie |
| Uruguay | María Jacqueline Beltrán | 17 | Montevideo |
| Venezuela | Paola Ruggeri | 21 | Caracas |
| Wales | Lianne Gray | 20 | Cardiff |
| West Germany | Loana Katharina Radecki | 20 | Berlin |
| Western Samoa | Falute Mama Aluni | - | Apia |
