= Sri Yulianti Soemardjo =

Indonesian model, Gymnastics instructor, Miss Universe Indonesia 1982

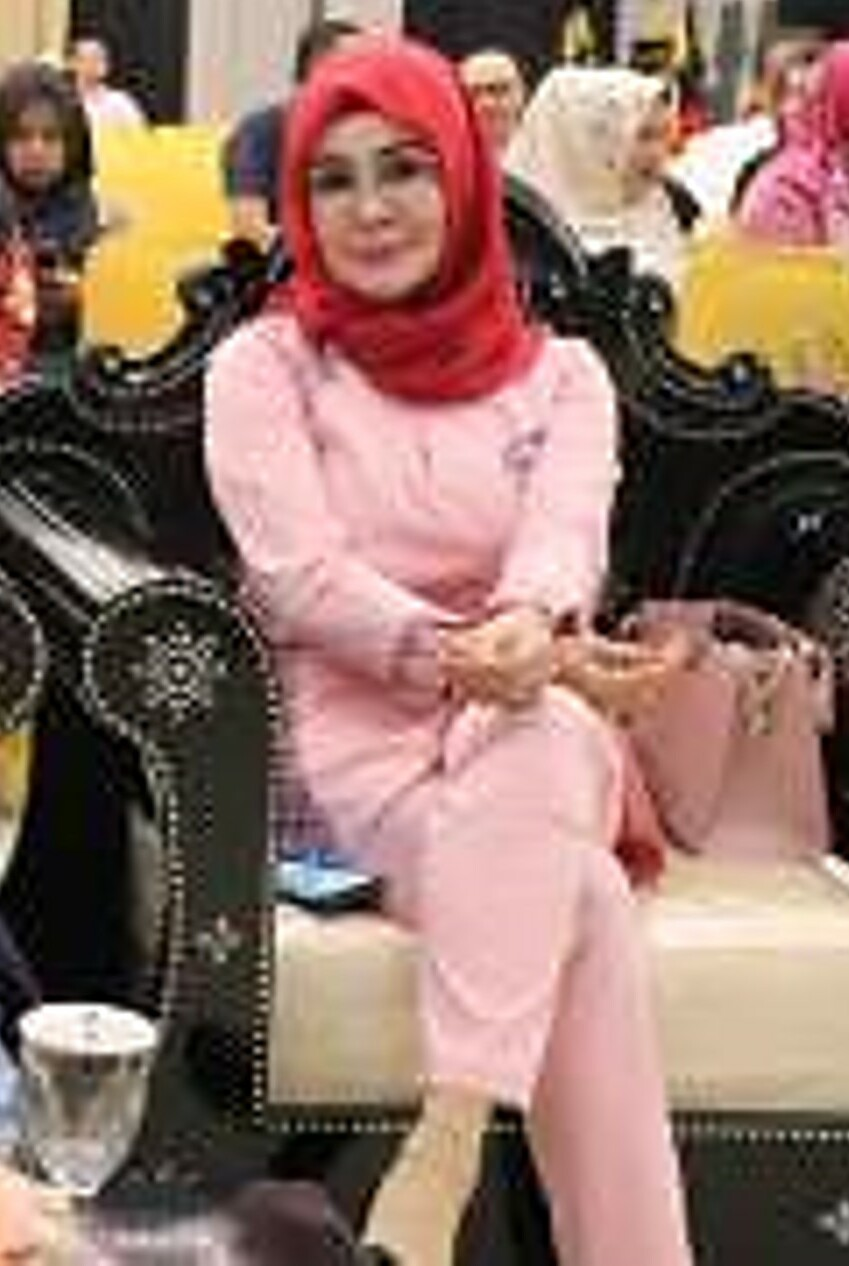
- Yulianti in 2017
- Born: Sri Yulianti Soemardjo; 25 July 1965 (age 61); Jakarta, Indonesia
- Other name: Sri Yulianti
- Height: 5 ft 7 in (1.70 m)
- Beauty pageant titleholder
- Title: Miss Universe Indonesia 1982
- Hair color: Black
- Eye color: Brown
- Major competitions: Miss Universe 1982; (Unplaced)

Hajah Sri Yulianti Soemardjo (born 25 July 1965), popularly known as Hj. Sri Yulianti, is an Indonesian former model, gymnastics instructor and beauty pageant titleholder who appointed as Miss Universe Indonesia 1982, and went on to represent Indonesia in Miss Universe 1982 in Lima, Peru.

== Pageantry ==
=== Miss Universe ===
Yulianti started her foray into the world of pageantry at the age of 17, when was crowned winner of Miss Universe Indonesia 1982. Yulianti represented Indonesia in the Miss Universe 1982 pageant, in Lima, Peru. She was one of 77 contestants, but did not qualify for the semi-final round.

== Life after pageants ==
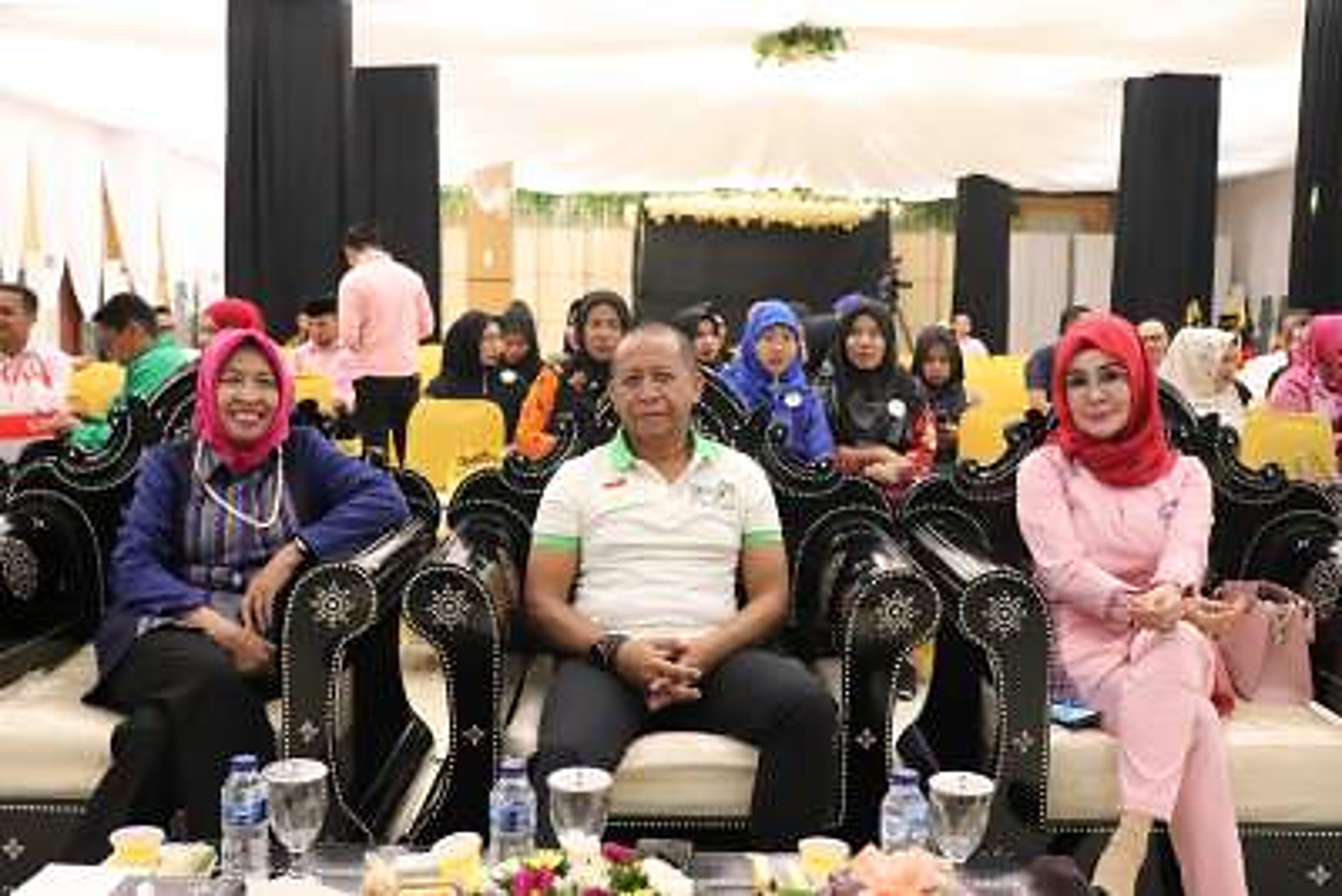
Yulianti (right) as the Chairwomen of the Indonesian Creative Gymnastics Association (IOSKI) for the province of West Nusa Tenggara.

In 1984 there was a controversy surrounding the involvement of Yulianti and Andi Botenri in international beauty pageants in 1982 and 1983, since both had travelled unofficially, and the international pageants were deemed inappropriate by the Indonesian government.

During the COVID-19 pandemic, Yulianti spent time in her gymnastics studio. From 2022 to 2027, Yulianti is Chairwomen of the Indonesian Creative Gymnastics Association (IOSKI) for the province of West Nusa Tenggara. Yulianti is a creative gymnastics instructor, especially to those who are interested in becoming gymnasts with the Indonesian Athletics Association.

== See also ==
- Miss Universe Indonesia
- Miss Universe 1982

Awards and achievements
Preceded by South Sulawesi; Andi Nana Riwayatie Basoamier	Miss Universe Indonesia; 1982	Succeeded by South Sulawesi; Andi Botenri
