= Susanty Manuhutu =

Indonesian model, Presenter and Miss Universe Indonesia 1995

- Born: Susanty Priscilla Adresina Manuhutu; 7 January 1974 (age 52); Jakarta, Indonesia
- Education: Bachelor of Architect
- Alma mater: Christian University of Indonesia
- Occupations: model; architect; engineer; beauty pageant titleholder
- Height: 1.78 m (5 ft 10 in)
- Spouse: Alexander Crabtree (m. 1997)
- Beauty pageant titleholder
- Title: Puteri Indonesia 1995; Miss Universe Indonesia 1995
- Years active: 1995–present
- Major competitions: Puteri Indonesia 1995; (Winner); Miss Universe 1995; (Unplaced)

Susanty Priscilla Adresina Manuhutu (born 7 January 1974) is an Indonesian model, architect, engineer and beauty pageant titleholder who was crowned Puteri Indonesia 1995. She represented Indonesia at the Miss Universe 1995 pageant and went unplace. She is the first and the only eastern Indonesian women who was crowned Puteri Indonesia, where she represented her parents' hometown Maluku at Puteri Indonesia 1995.

== Personal life ==
Susanty was born in Jakarta, Indonesia, on 7 January 1974 to a Moluccan family background, where she also spend her childhood in Ambon, Maluku. She holds a bachelor's degree on architecture from Christian University of Indonesia in Jakarta, Indonesia. She work as a model and being the brand ambassador of Sunsilk hair shampoo and conditioner.

On 30 December 1997, She is married to American businessman Haries Alexander Crabtree in Amankila by Aman Resorts, Bali. In 1999 besides being a full-time mother, she work as the professional engineering in Conoco and ConocoPhillips, now She is currently work as the Corporate Communications Manager for Chevron Corporation Indonesia, allowing her to travel around Jakarta in Indonesia, Atyrau in Kazakhstan, San Francisco and Pittsburgh in the United States.

== Pageantry ==
=== Puteri Indonesia 1995 ===
At the age of 25, Susanty started her foray at the world of pageantry by representing her home province of Maluku in the Puteri Indonesia 1995 pageant, and was crowned on 11 April 1995 in the Jakarta Convention Center, the finale night was attended by Miss Universe 1994, Sushmita Sen of India.

=== Miss Universe 1995 ===
Susanty represented Indonesia in Miss Universe 1995 was held on 12 May 1995 at the Windhoek Country Club Resort in Windhoek, Namibia. and was the first Puteri Indonesia winner to represent Indonesia in Miss Universe history. She did not place at the competition.

== See also ==
- Puteri Indonesia
- Miss Universe 1995
- Andi Botenri
- Alya Rohali

Awards and achievements
Preceded by Yosefanny Maria Ursula Waas	Puteri Maluku; 1995	Succeeded by Caroline Jeanette Wairisal
Preceded by Jakarta SCR – Venna Melinda Bruglia	Puteri Indonesia; 1995	Succeeded by Jakarta SCR – Alya Rohali
Preceded by South Sulawesi; Andi Botenri	Miss Universe Indonesia; 1995	Succeeded by Jakarta SCR – Alya Rohali
