= Yuliarti Rahayu =

Miss Universe Indonesia 1976

- Born: Yuliarti Rahayuningsih Merati; Jakarta July 29, 1954 (age 72)
- Education: Bandung Institute of Technology
- Beauty pageant titleholder
- Title: Puteri Indonesia 1976; Miss Universe Indonesia 1976
- Major competitions: Puteri Indonesia 1976; (Winner); Miss Universe 1976; (Unplaced)

Yuliarti Rahayuningsih Merati (born July 29, 1954), also known as Yuliarti Rahayu, is an Indonesian pharmacist and beauty pageant titleholder who won Puteri Indonesia 1976 contest and subsequently competed at Miss Universe 1976 in Hong Kong.

She spent her career at a state owned pharmaceutical company, Indofarma.

== Pageantry ==
=== Miss Universe ===
As the winner of Puteri Indonesia 1976, at the age of 22, Yuliarti travelled to Hong Kong and represent Indonesia in the Miss Universe 1976 pageant and became the third Indonesian to ever competed in Miss Universe pageant.

== See also ==
- Miss Universe Indonesia
- Miss Universe 1976

Awards and achievements
Preceded by Jakarta SCR; Lydia Arlini Wahab	Miss Universe Indonesia; 1976	Succeeded by South Sumatra; Siti Mirza Nuria Arifin
