= Miss Universe 1982 =

31st Miss Universe pageant

- Date: 26 July 1982
- Presenters: Bob Barker; Joan Van Ark
- Entertainment: Rex Smith; José Luis Rodríguez
- Venue: Coliseo Amauta, Lima, Peru
- Broadcaster: CBS (international); Panamericana (official broadcaster)
- Entrants: 77
- Placements: 12
- Debuts: New Caledonia
- Withdrawals: Cyprus; Fiji; Gibraltar; Saint Kitts; Tahiti
- Returns: El Salvador; Indonesia; Papua New Guinea; Sint Maarten; Suriname
- Winner: Karen Baldwin; Canada
- Congeniality: Maureen Lewis (Cayman Islands)
- Best National Costume: Francesca Zaza (Peru)
- Photogenic: Ava Marilyn Burke (Bahamas)

Miss Universe 1982 was the 31st Miss Universe pageant, held at the Coliseo Amauta in Lima, Peru, on 26 July 1982. It was the first time in the pageant's history that the event was held in South America. Seventy-seven contestants competed in the pageant. At the conclusion of the event, Karen Baldwin of Canada was crowned by Irene Saez of Venezuela. This is the first time Canada won the pageant.

The stadium where the contest was taking place was attacked with dynamite on 26 July, during the contest's finale.

== Results ==
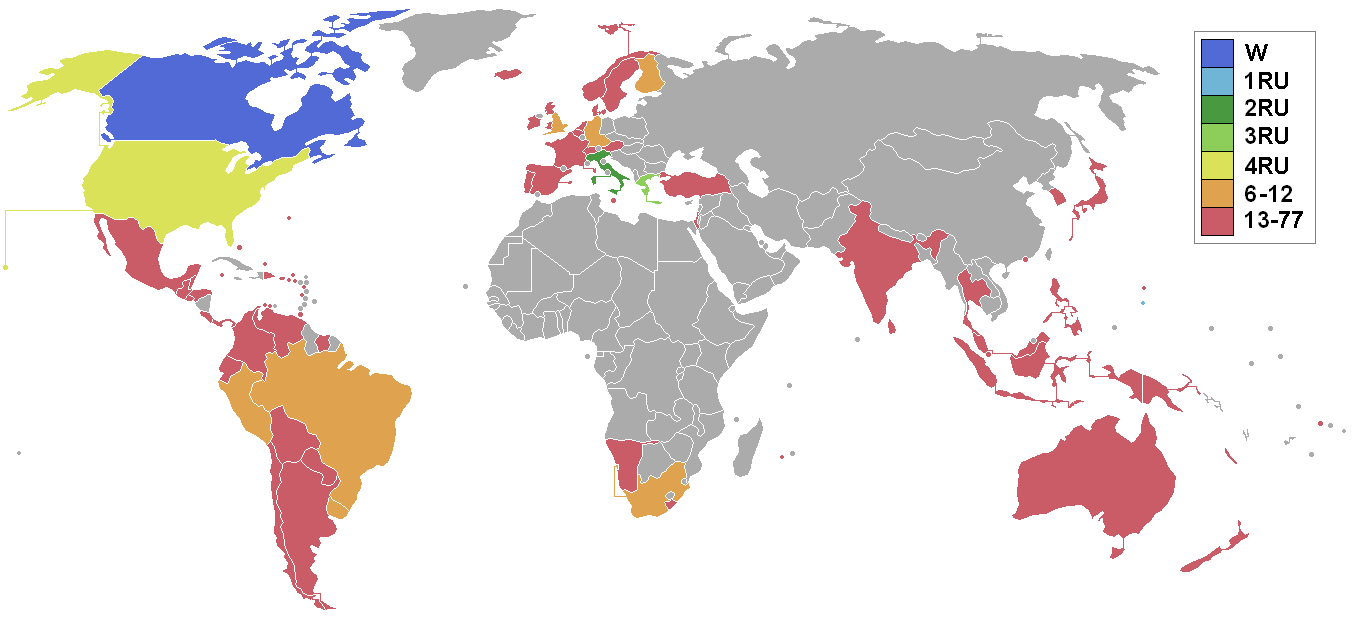
Miss Universe 1982 participating nations and results

=== Placements ===
Placement	Contestant
Miss Universe 1982	Canada – Karen Baldwin
1st Runner-Up	Guam – Patty Chong Kerkos
2nd Runner-Up	Italy – Cinzia Fiordeponti
3rd Runner-Up	Greece – Tina Roussou
4th Runner-Up	United States – Terri Utley
Top 12	Brazil – Celice Marques; England – Della Dolan; Finland – Sari Aspholm; Peru – Francesca Zaza; South Africa – Odette Scrooby; Uruguay – Silvia Vila; West Germany – Kerstin Paeserack

==== Final Scores ====
Country/Territory	Preliminary Average	Interview	Swimsuit	Evening Gown	Semifinal Average
Canada	7.761 (9)	8.400 (5)	8.275 (3)	8.525 (3)	8.400 (2)
Guam	7.892 (5)	8.867 (1)	8.692 (1)	8.355 (4)	8.638 (1)
Italy	7.714 (11)	7.925 (9)	8.067 (5)	8.608 (2)	8.200 (4)
Greece	7.847 (6)	8.042 (8)	8.325 (2)	8.317 (5)	8.228 (3)
United States	8.131 (2)	8.425 (4)	8.192 (4)	7.925 (8)	8.181 (5)
South Africa	8.406 (1)	8.583 (2)	7.225 (10)	8.707 (1)	8.172 (6)
England	8.100 (3)	8.433 (3)	7.808 (7)	8.167 (7)	8.136 (7)
Peru	7.797 (8)	8.218 (6)	7.508 (8)	8.292 (6)	8.006 (8)
Brazil	8.011 (4)	8.133 (7)	7.892 (6)	7.917 (9)	7.981 (9)
Finland	7.719 (10)	7.808 (10)	7.408 (9)	7.908 (10)	7.708 (10)
Uruguay	7.594 (12)	7.692 (11)	7.167 (11)	7.783 (11)	7.547 (11)
Germany	7.808 (7)	7.204 (12)	7.008 (12)	7.483 (12)	7.232 (12)

== Contestants ==
- Argentina – María Alejandra Basile
- Aruba – Noriza Antonio Helder
- Australia – Lou Ann Ronchi
- Austria – Elisabeth Kawan
- Bahamas – Ava Marilyn Burke
- Belgium – Marie-Pierre Lemaitre
- Belize – Sharon Kay Auxilliou
- Bermuda – Heather Ross
- Bolivia – Sandra Villaroel
- Brazil – Celice Márques
- British Virgin Islands – Luce Dahlia Hodge
- Canada – Karen Baldwin
- Cayman Islands – Maureen Theresa Lewis
- Chile – Jenny Purto Arab
- Colombia – Nadya Santacruz
- Costa Rica – Liliana Corella Espinoza
- Curaçao – Minerva Ranila Heiroms
- Denmark – Tina Maria Nielsen
- Dominican Republic – Soraya Morey
- Ecuador – Jacqueline Burgos
- El Salvador – Jeanette Marroquín
- England – Della Dolan
- Finland – Sari Aspholm
- France – Martine Philipps
- Greece – Tina Roussou
- Guadeloupe – Lydia Galin
- Guam – Patty Chong Kerkos
- Guatemala – Edith Whitbeck
- Holland – Brigitte Diereckx
- Honduras – Eva Lissethe Barahona
- Hong Kong – Angie Leung
- Iceland – Gudrun Moller
- India – Pamela Singh
- Indonesia – Sri Yulianti Soemardjo
- Ireland – Geraldine McGrory
- Israel – Deborah Naomi Hess
- Italy – Cinzia Fiordeponti
- Japan – Eri Okuwaki
- Malaysia – Siti Rohani Wahid
- Malta – Rita Falzon
- Martinique – Corine Soler
- Mexico – María del Carmen López
- (South Africa) Namibia – Deseree Anita Kotze
- New Caledonia – Lenka Topalovitch
- New Zealand – Sandra Dexter
- Northern Mariana Islands – Sheryl Sonoda Sizemore
- Norway – Janett Krefting
- Panama – Isora de Lourdes López
- Papua New Guinea – Moi Eli
- Paraguay – Maris Villalba
- Peru – Francesca Zaza
- Philippines – Maria Isabel Lopez
- Portugal – Ana Maria Valdiz
- Puerto Rico – Lourdes Milagros Mantero Hormazábal
- Réunion – Ginon Manthe
- Scotland – Georgina Kearney
- Singapore – Judicia Nonis
- Sint Maarten – Liana Elviara Brown
- South Africa – Odette Scrooby
- South Korea – Sun-hee Park
- Spain – Cristina Pérez Cottrell
- Sri Lanka – Ann Monica Tradigo
- Suriname – Vanessa de Vries
- Sweden – Anna Kari Maria Bergström
- Switzerland – Jeannette Linkenheill
- Thailand – Nipaporn Tarapanich
- Transkei – Noxolisi Mji
- Trinidad and Tobago – Suzanne Traboulay
- Turkey – Canan Kakmaci
- Turks and Caicos Islands – Jacqueline Astwood
- United States – Terri Utley
- United States Virgin Islands – Ingeborg Hendricks
- Uruguay – Silvia Vila
- Venezuela – Ana Teresa Oropeza
- Wales – Michelle Donelly
- West Germany – Kerstin Paeserack
- Western Samoa – Ivy Evelyn Warner
