= Lydia Arlini Wahab =

Indonesian lawyer and model (born 1953)

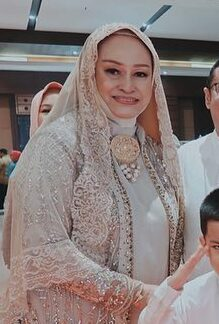
- Wahab in 2019
- Born: Lydia Arlini Wahab; 13 December 1953 (age 72); Jakarta, Indonesia
- Other name: Lydia Wahab
- Education: University of Indonesia
- Height: 5 ft 10 in (1.78 m)
- Beauty pageant titleholder
- Title: Ratu Indonesia 1973; Miss International Indonesia 1974; Miss Universe Indonesia 1975
- Hair color: Brown
- Eye color: Brown
- Major competitions: Ratu Indonesia 1973; (Winner); Miss Asia Pacific International 1974; (Unplaced); Miss International 1974; (Unplaced); Miss Universe 1975; (Unplaced)

Lydia Arlini Wahab (born 13 December 1953) is an Indonesian lawyer, model and beauty pageant titleholder who initially appointed as Miss International Indonesia 1974 and later Miss Universe Indonesia 1975. She went on to represent Indonesia and competed in both Miss International 1974 and Miss Universe 1975 respectively. Wahab became the very first Indonesian woman to represent Indonesia at two different major international pageant. She was the very first crossover candidate to accomplish this feat by representing Indonesia at two of the Big Four international beauty pageants.

== Early life, background and career ==
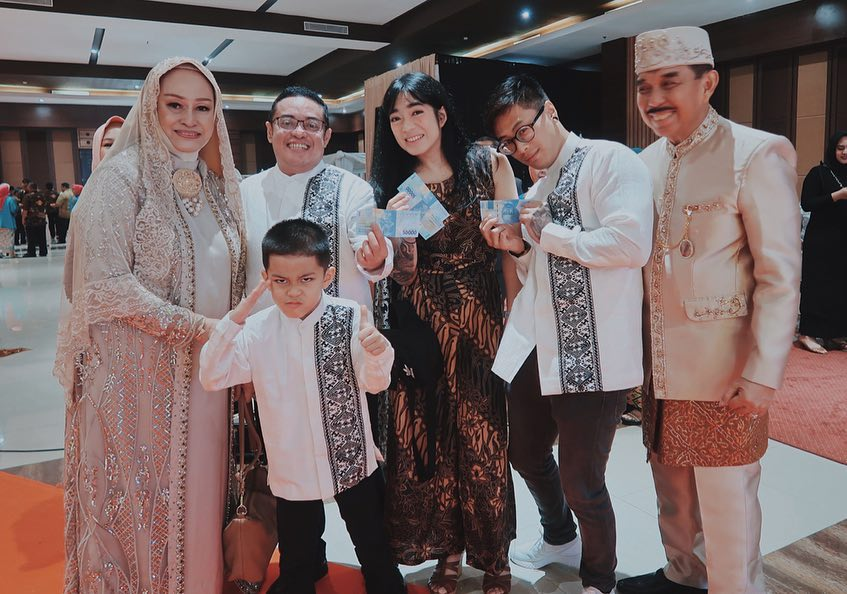
Wahab (left) together with her family on 20 April 2019.

Wahab was born on 13 December 1953, to a Betawis parents. She obtained her Master of Law degree from University of Indonesia in Jakarta, Indonesia, and currently works as a lawyer and accountant.

On 6 August 1976, a year after competing in Miss Universe 1975, Wahab married an Indonesian National Armed Forces, Lieutenant commander Rianzi Julidar, they married according to Lampung cultural customs, the wedding was attended by several well-known Indonesian artists. Soon after her marriage, Wahab giving a birth to her daughter Prisa Adinda Arini Rianzi on 6 January 1988, who later become a singer and actress.

On 10 July 2017, Wahab had to face stage 3C ovarian cancer. Since then, Wahab became a cancer survivor, she began to change her lifestyle to be healthier by doing exercises. Wahab also participates in the Indonesian Cancer Foundation, "Yayasan Sahabat Bangsal Anak", to provide motivation to the young cancer survivors in Indonesia.

== Pageantry ==
=== Miss Asia Pacific International ===
Wahab represented Indonesia in the 7th edition of Miss Asia Pacific International 1974, hold in Manila, the Philippines, during the finale coronation night she won a "Miss Crowning Glory" special award.

=== Miss International ===
After being crowned Miss International Indonesia 1974 at the age of 21, Wahab represented Indonesia in Miss International 1974 and was the fifth Indonesian woman to compete in the Miss International beauty pageant. The pageant was held in Tokyo, Japan.

=== Miss Universe ===
As the winner of Miss Universe Indonesia 1975, Wahab represent Indonesia in the Miss Universe 1975 pageant, Wahab became the second Indonesian woman to ever compete in Miss Universe history, she travelled to San Salvador, El Salvador.

== See also ==
- Puteri Indonesia
- Miss Universe Indonesia
- Miss International 1974
- Miss Universe 1975

Awards and achievements
Preceded by North Sulawesi; Louise Maria Dominique Maengkom	Miss International Indonesia; 1974	Succeeded by Central Java; Yayuk Rahayu Sosiawati
Preceded by West Java; Nia Kurniasih Ardikoesoema	Miss Universe Indonesia; 1975	Succeeded by Banten; Juliarti Rahayu Gunawan
