= Karen Dianne Baldwin =

Canadian actress, television host and beauty queen (born 1963)

Karen Baldwin
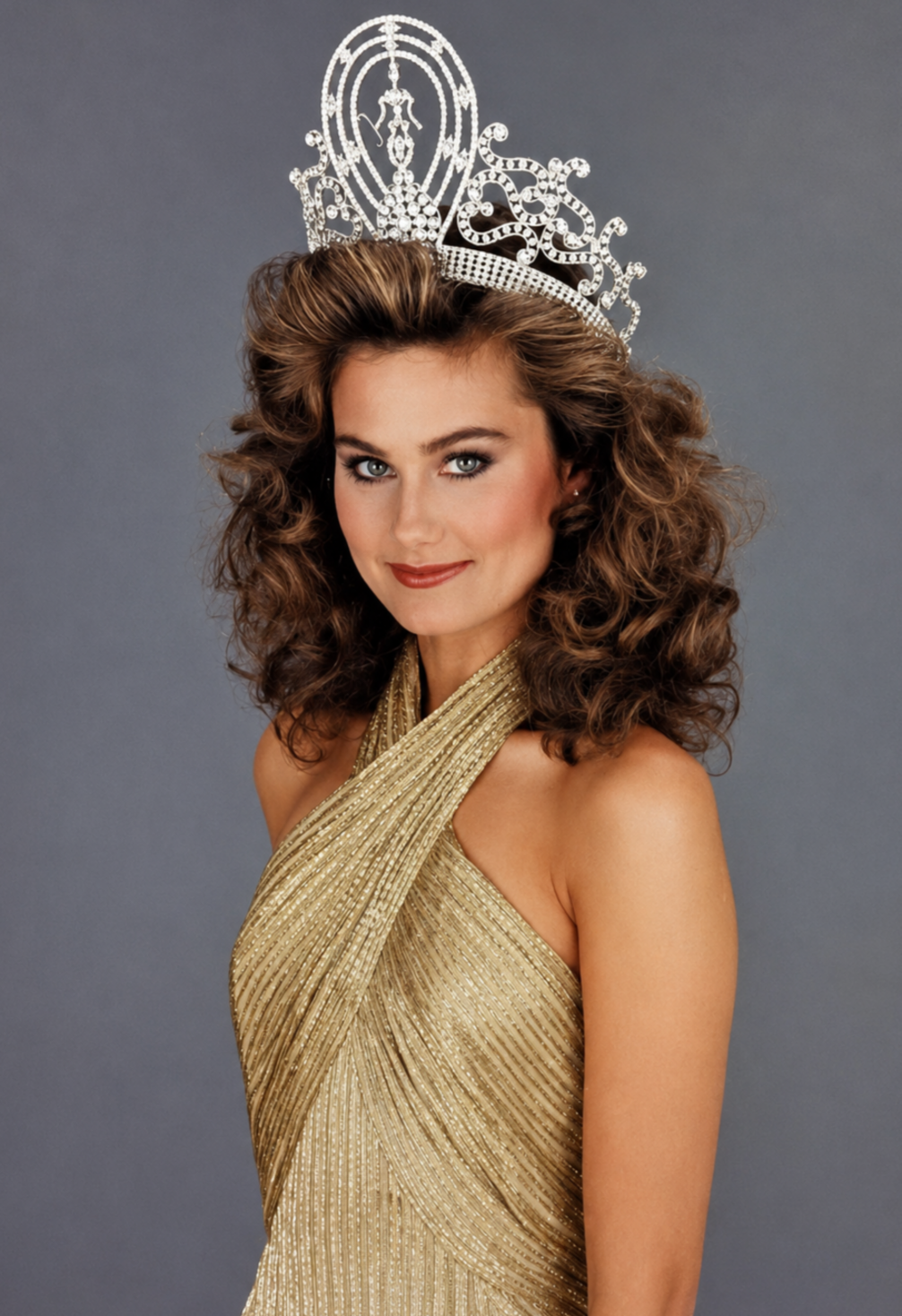
- Born: Karen Dianne Baldwin; September 6, 1963 (age 63); London, Ontario, Canada
- Height: 1.78 m (5 ft 10 in)
- Spouses: Jack Scalia (m. 1987–1996); Nicholas Karazissis
- Children: 2
- Beauty pageant titleholder
- Title: Miss Canada 1982; Miss Universe 1982
- Hair colour: Brown
- Eye colour: Blue green

Karen Dianne Baldwin (born September 6, 1963) is a Canadian actress, tv host and beauty pageant titleholder who was crowned Miss Universe 1982. She is the first Canadian to win the Miss Universe title.

== Early life ==
Baldwin was born in London, Ontario. Her father William is president of a real estate agency. Her mother Marion is a real estate broker. She has two brothers. Before becoming Miss Universe, she attended London Central Secondary School in London, Ontario.

== Miss Universe ==
Baldwin was the winner of the 1982 Miss Canada pageant and was crowned Miss Universe in Lima, Peru. She then relinquished her crown to Lorraine Downes the following year in the United States.

== Life after Miss Universe ==
She hosted The New You, a Canadian fashion and lifestyle television program and was one of the co-hosts for the 1989 Miss Universe pageant, held in Cancún, Mexico.

She was featured in the comedy movie Who's That Girl, starring Madonna and Griffin Dunne, as "Heather", one of the kidnapped bridesmaids. She also appeared in the movies: Spellbinder, Night Eyes, Last Call, T-Force and Sudden Death.

She works as a realtor for Baldwin Scott Thomas Team in Calabasas, California.

== Personal life ==
She married actor Jack Scalia in 1987 and they had two daughters. They were divorced in 1996. Her second husband is Nicholas Karazissis.

Awards and achievements
Preceded by (Venezuela) Irene Sáez	Miss Universe; 1982	Succeeded by (New Zealand) Lorraine Downes
Media offices
Preceded by Tracy Scoggins	Miss Universe colour commentator (with Emma Samms); 1989	Succeeded by Leeza Gibbons and Margaret Gardiner
Preceded by Jodi Yvonne Rutledge	Miss Canada colour commentator 1982	Succeeded by Terry MacKay
