= Alya Rohali =

Indonesian actress (born 1976)

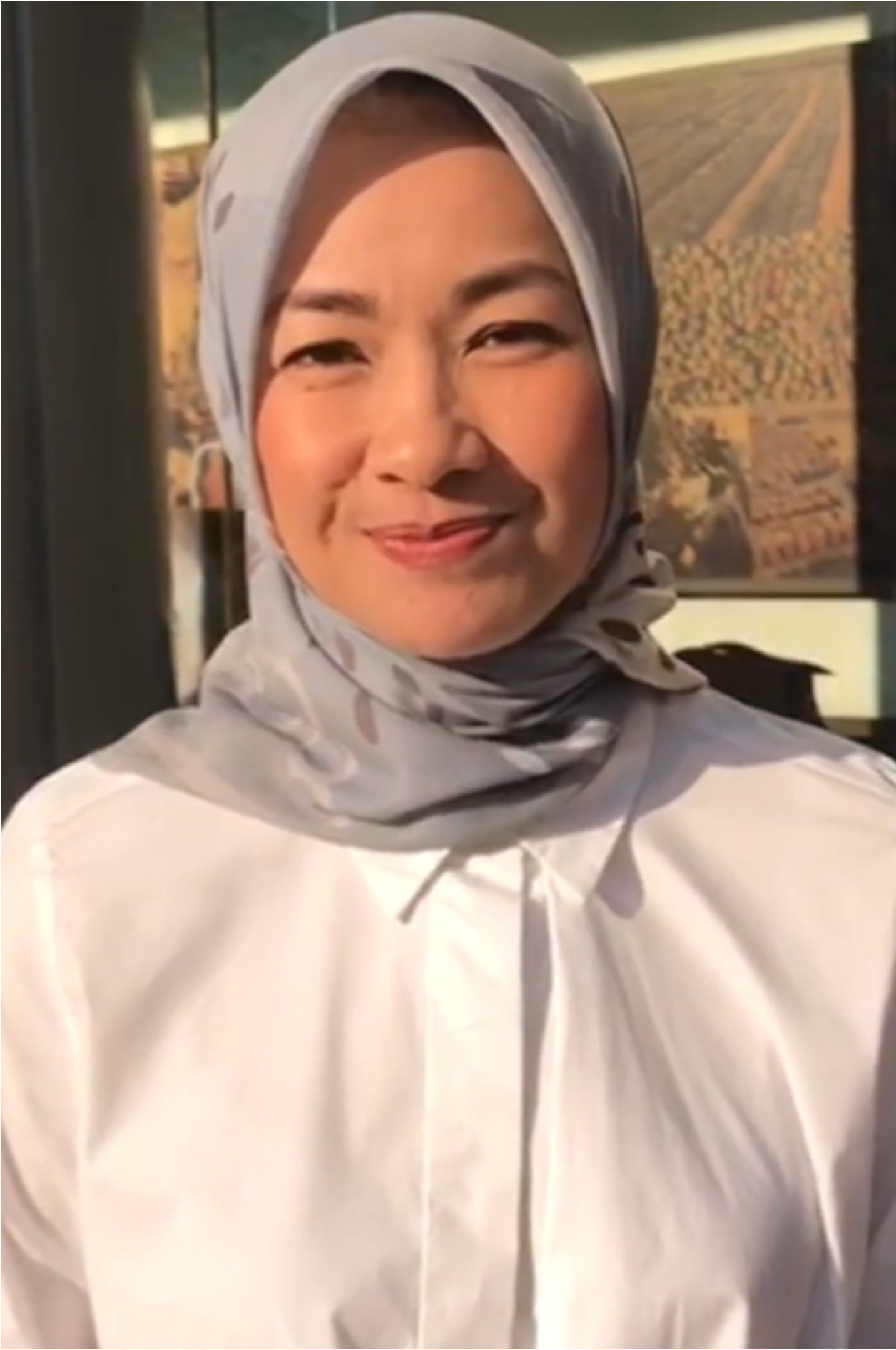
- Alya Rohali for Zayyan TV in April 2020
- Born: Alya Rohali; 1 December 1976 (age 49); Jakarta, Indonesia
- Education: University of Trisakti, University of Indonesia
- Height: 1.70 m (5 ft 7 in)
- Beauty pageant titleholder
- Title: Puteri Indonesia 1996; Miss Universe Indonesia 1996
- Major competitions: Puteri Indonesia 1996; (Winner); Miss Universe 1996; (Unplaced)

Alya Rohali (born 1 December 1976) is an Indonesian film and soap opera actress, television show host, notary, model and a beauty pageant titleholder, who was crowned Puteri Indonesia 1996. She represented Indonesia at the Miss Universe 1996 pageant. She was the first (and only) person to hold the title of Puteri Indonesia (i.e., the Indonesian representative to all of the international beauty competitions) to hold the title for four consecutive years (1996, 1997, 1998 and 1999).

== Early life and career ==
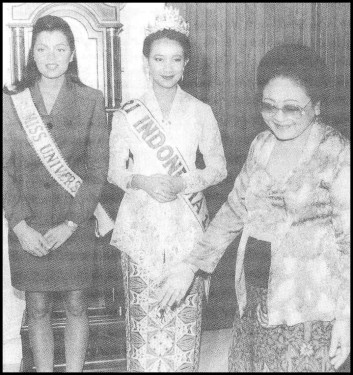
Rohali (middle) together with Miss Universe 1995, Chelsi Smith (left) and Indonesian First Lady, Siti Hartinah (right) in 1997.

Alya Rohali was born in Jakarta on 1 December 1976, the fourth child to Rohali Sani and his wife Atit Tresnawati. She received her Bachelor of Law degree from Trisakti University. She was a witness to the riots engendered by the 12 May 1998 shooting of 4 university students. Despite being within the campus, she became a victim of tear gas used by the security forces to control the rioters at the university gates.

Fellow model Okky Asokawati guided Rohali during the initial period of her modelling career. She was crowned Puteri Indonesia 1996 and represented her country at Miss Universe 1996 beauty pageant but could not make it to the Final 10. Previous Indonesian representatives were sent as observers. However, Rohali was made a participant and her wearing a swimsuit at the event was received negatively by Indonesian media. She received threats and was eventually attacked by people who considered her participation in the event an "immoral activity". Mien Sugandhi, former State Minister heading the Ministry of Women Empowerment and Child Protection from March 1993 to March 1998, criticised the event and called her participation in it an "insult to the government". It was not until 2005, that Indonesia was represented at Miss Universe pageant.

Helmy Yahya and Rohali hosted the popular TV quiz show Siapa Berani?.Together they won the Panasonic Gobel Awards 2002 in the "Best Male and Female Quiz Show Host category". Rohali, following her transition to television roles, has been cited as the "most successful" Indonesian beauty pageant winner who entered the entertainment industry. After she reduced her weight by 10 kg in 2 months, a slimming center appointed her its celebrity spokesperson. Rohali holds a Master's degree in Law from University of Indonesia. She's also a notary.

Rohali made her film debut with Jose Poernomo-directed drama Moga Bunda Disayang Allah (2013). Her second film role in Di Balik 98 (2015), earned her a nomination in Best Supporting Actress category at the Indonesian Box Office Movie Awards 2016.

== Personal life ==
Rohali married Eri Surya Kelana in 1999 and has a daughter with him. However the couple separated in 2003. Three years later she married a Madurese businessman Faiz Ramzy Rachbini. Rohali's second child was born on 10 October 2010.

== Filmography ==
Rohali has acted on several television series and film, she is also presenting some TV Show programme.

=== Movie ===
Year	Title	Genre	Role	Film Production	Ref.
2013	Moga Bunda Disayang Allah; Hope God Loves You, Mom	drama	as Bunda HK	Soraya Intercine Film	
2015	Di Balik 98; Behind 98	reality	as Dayu	MNC Corporation	
2021	Tersanjung the Movie	romance	as Nisa	Netflix	
2022	12 Cerita Glen Anggara; The Twelve Stories of Glen Anggara	romance	as Huna	Kharisma Starvision Plus; Falcon Pictures	

=== TV Series ===
Year	Title	Genre	Role	Film Production	Broadcaster	Ref.
1997-1998	Serpihan Mutiara Retak	melodrama	as Tica Pratiwi	Rapi Films	Indosiar	
2000-2001	Meniti Cinta	melodrama	as Wina	Rapi Films	RCTI	
2005-2007	Kejar Kusnadi	comedy-drama	as Lasmi	Soraya Intercine Film	RCTI	
2020-2021	Istri Impian	drama	as Diana	Mega Kreasi Films	Indosiar	

=== TV Show ===
Year	Title	Genre	Role	Film Production	Broadcaster	Ref.
2001–present	Siapa Berani?	comedy-quiz	as Herself	Soraya Intercine Film	TVRI and Indosiar	

== Awards and nomination ==
Year	Awards	Category	Nominated work	Result	Ref.
2002	Panasonic Gobel Awards	Best Female Quiz Show Host	Siapa Berani?	Won	
2016	Indonesian Box Office Movie Awards	Best Female Actress	Di Balik 98	Nominated	

== See also ==
- Puteri Indonesia
- Miss Universe 1996
- Susanty Priscilla Adresina Manuhutu

== Bibliography ==
- Anderson, Benedict Richard O'Gorman (2001). Violence and the State in Suharto's Indonesia. SEAP Publications. ISBN 978-0-87727-729-3.
- Bennett, Linda Rae; Davies, Sharyn Graham (2014). Sex and Sexualities in Contemporary Indonesia: Sexual Politics, Health, Diversity and Representations. Routledge. ISBN 978-1-317-91097-8.

Awards and achievements
Preceded by Shahnaz Haque	Puteri Jakarta SCR 1; 1996	Succeeded by Windy Wulandari Rahayu
Preceded by Maluku – Susanty Priscilla Adresina Manuhutu	Puteri Indonesia; 1996	Succeeded by Jakarta SCR 3 – Bernika Irnadianis Ifada

Puteri Indonesia titleholders (1996)
Puteri Indonesia 1996 (Miss Universe Indonesia 1996); Jakarta – Alya Rohali	Puteri Indonesia 1996 1st Runner-up (Puteri Indonesia 1996 1st Runner-Up); Central Java – Dyah Palipur Yudhawati	Puteri Indonesia 1996 2nd Runner-up (Puteri Indonesia 1996 2nd Runner-Up); West Sumatra – Gusria Setiani
