= Miss Canada (disambiguation) =

Miss Canada is a beauty pageant for young women in Canada.

Miss Canada may also refer to:

- Miss Dominion of Canada (1959–1979), selected Canada's representatives to various international contests
- Miss Universe Canada (2003– ), selects winners for the Miss Universe pageant
- Miss World Canada, selects winners for the Miss World competition
- Miss Earth Canada (2001– ), selects winners for the Miss Earth competition
- Miss Teen Canada (1969–1990)
- Miss Canada International (1995– )
- Miss Canada Icon, a national personification of Canada

== See also ==
- Mr. Canada (disambiguation)
