= Miss BC =

Miss, Mrs., & Miss Teen BC Pageant

Miss, Mrs., & Miss Teen BC
- Formation: 2002
- Type: Beauty pageant
- Headquarters: Langley
- Location: Canada
- Members: Miss World Canada
- Official language: English
- Parent organization: Courage Productions
- Website: missbc.ca

Courage Productions runs the Miss BC pageant, including the Mrs. BC, Miss Teen BC, and Miss Charity BC titles. It was founded in 2002 inLangley, British Columbia by Darren Storsley, and the final pageant night is televised by Shaw TV. The pageant has not been held since 2019 due to the COVID-19 pandemic.

== History ==
The Miss BC pageant is organized by Darren Storsley and is part of Courage Productions. Since 2006, the pageant has been held at the Langley Fine Arts School in Fort Langley, British Columbia. Miss BC does not have limitations on its contestants' height, weight, and age, but instead claims to focus on "inner beauty", with an emphasis on life skills and charity fundraising. In 2017, the pageant announced a 15-year reunion, with many of the past winners joining in celebration. Miss BC pageants raise money for the Canadian Cancer Society's Cops for Cancer fundraiser. To date, the pageants have raised over $400,000 for the charity.

Famous guests have occasionally attended to assist with hosting or performing, such as Monte Durham from Say Yes to the Dress:Atlanta.

Courage Productions also briefly ran the Top Teen of Canada pageant in 2008–2009, which was discontinued.

=== Titles ===
The primary titles awarded at the Miss BC pageant are Miss BC, Mrs. BC, Miss Teen BC, and Miss Charity BC. The Mrs. BC title was introduced in 2011 and is a category specifically aimed at married women. As part of the 15th Miss BC pageant, the competition introduced the Junior Miss BC title for girls aged 9 to 12. The runners up in the Junior Miss BC competition are given the title "Sparkle Ambassadors".

The Miss BC pageant also awards regional titles for the Fraser Valley, the Greater Vancouver area, the Lower Mainland, Northern BC, Vancouver Island, BC Interior and most recently, Southwest BC. In addition, the pageant gives out a Miss Congeniality award and a Heart & Soul award as voted on by contestants, and has a People's Choice Award as voted on by British Columbians.

== Winners ==
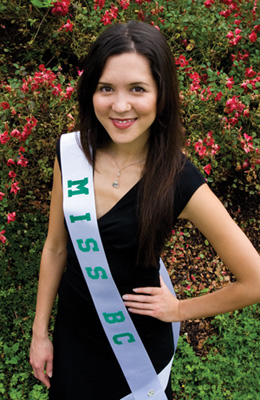
Tara Teng, Miss BC 2010

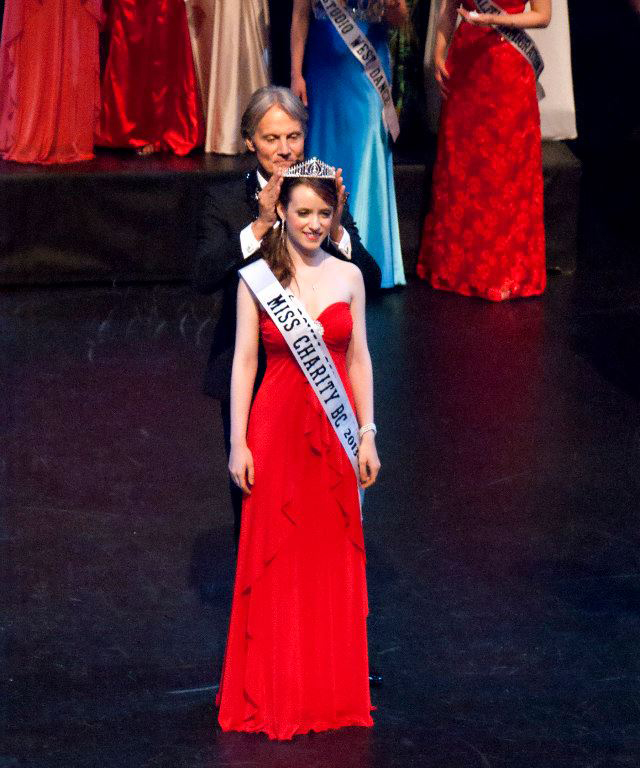
Patricia Celan, Miss Charity BC 2013

| Year | Miss BC | Mrs. BC | Miss Teen BC | Miss Charity BC | Junior Miss BC | Ref. |
|---|---|---|---|---|---|---|
| 2019 | Bremiella De Guzman | Sascia Sahota | Aria Krilanovich | Bonnie Johnstone | Isabella Reid | |
| 2018 | Christine Jamieson | Taylor Aller | Michelle Ahmadi | Cheryl Schindler | | |
| 2017 | Arsheep Purba | Genicca Whitney | Sallee Whitewing | Reshmi Chandra | Melarie Eustaquio | |
| 2016 | Gloren Guelos | Tetyana Golota | Alisha Kalia | Ramneek Jawandha | n/a | |
| 2015 | Shakti Shunmugam | Shalini Gambhir | Shalom Reimer | Zana Ng | n/a | |
| 2014 | Taylor Scott | Stanislava Kotyakov | Brette Joyal | Tanpreet Parmar | n/a | |
| 2013 | Ava Vanderstarren | Ashley Banuelos | Rebecca Ketler | Patricia Celan | n/a | |
| 2012 | Hannah Smith | Ami Muranetz | Charmaine Laride | Desiree Tremblay | n/a | |
| 2011 | Cheryl Dietrich | Carla Littlechief | | Alyssia Tang | n/a | |
| 2010 | Tara Teng | n/a | | Courtnee Anderson | n/a | |
| 2009 | Sandra Gin | n/a | | | n/a | |
| 2008 | Shaela Rae | n/a | Meghan Price | | n/a | |
| 2007 | | n/a | Jovan Stefani | | n/a | |
| 2006 | Natalie Vickery | n/a | Alex Keizer | | n/a | |
| 2005 | | n/a | Grace Pacifica Chen | | n/a | |
| 2004 | | n/a | | | n/a | |
| 2003 | | n/a | | | n/a | |
| 2002 | | n/a | | | n/a | |

- Meghan Price was the Top Teen of Canada winner in 2008.

== Miss BC at national and international pageants ==
The Miss BC pageant is a Miss World Canada qualifier. Several of the pageant winners have gone on to win or compete in national and international pageants.

Notable examples include:

- Bremiella de Guzman won the Miss Canada pageant in 2020.
- Christine Jamieson won the Miss Canada pageant in 2019 and placed 2nd runner up at the Miss Continents 2019 pageant.
- Tara Teng won Miss Canada in 2011 and Miss World Canada in 2012. She was also a contestant in the 2012 Miss World pageant.
- Shalom Reimer won the Miss Teen Canada pageant in 2016.
- Gloren Guelos won Miss Supranational Canada 2019. She was also a contestant in the Miss Universe Canada 2018 pageant and in the Miss World Canada 2019 pageant.
- Patricia Celan won Mrs. Canada 2021 and made international headlines for shaving her head for a cancer charity following her Miss Charity BC 2013 crowning.
- Grace Pacifica Chen was a contestant in Miss Chinese Vancouver 2009. She was also a contestant in Miss Supranational 2015 and Miss Grand International 2016.
- Courtnee Anderson was a contestant in the Miss Earth Canada pageant in 2011.

== Hosts and judges ==
Darren Storsley is the host and founder of the pageant. He was also a pageant winner himself; Mr. Canada in 2003, winner of the Canadian Male Model Search in 2004, and Mr. World Canada in 2007. Storsley is employed as a teacher at Langley Fine Arts School. He is a gay man, is the faculty advisor for the school's gay–straight alliance, and represented Canada at Manhunt International.

Notable judges include previous titleholders such as Sandra Gin, Tara Teng, Patricia Celan, Grace Pacifica Chen, and former Mr. World Canada and Mister International Canada Ron Wear.

== See also ==
- Miss World Canada
