= Miss Grand Canada =

Beauty pageant in Canada

- Formation: 2017
- Founder: Angelo Di Benedetto
- Type: Beauty pageant
- Headquarters: Calgary
- Location: Canada
- Members: Miss Grand International
- Official language: English
- National Director: Michelle Weswaldi
- Parent organization: Pageant Group Canada Inc. (2019 – Present)
- Website: MissGrandCanada.com

Miss Grand Canada licensee timeline

Miss Grand Canada is a national beauty pageant, founded in 2017 in Calgary by Angelo Di Benedetto of Di Benedetto Model Agency. The contest winner represented the country in its parent international platform, Miss Grand International. After the license was taken over by Pageant Group Canada Inc. in 2019, most Canadian candidates at Miss Grand International were determined through the Miss World Canada pageant.

Canada has been sending its delegates to compete in the Miss Grand International since 2013. The highest achievement was the second runner-up, won in 2014 by a model and actress from Alberta, Kathryn Kohut.

== Background ==
From 2013 to 2015, the Miss Grand Canada license belonged to the Miss Earth Canada organizer, Rosotro Productions, headed by a Montréal-based Filipino-Canadian organizer, Ronaldo Soriano Trono. The Canadian representatives to Miss Grand International during such a period were elected through the Miss Earth Canada pageant.

Canada began to organize the separate event for the Miss Grand International pageant in 2017, under the management of the Calgary-based model agency Di Benedetto Models, headed by Angelo Di Benedetto. However, the pageant's winner, Maddison Fysh, resigned the title, which caused the organizer to appoint their affiliated model –Natalie Allin – to instead compete in the international competition. The same incident also happen in 2018, when the runner-up Grace Diamani was promoted to take over the position after the original winner – Veronica Rodriguez – had relinquished the national title for undisclosed reasons.

In 2019, Benedetto lost the franchise to Michelle Weswaldi, the president of the Miss World Canada pageant and Pageant Group Canada. Since then, the first runner-up of the said national contest has automatically been assumed Miss Grand Canada, Except in 2021, the Miss World 2020 contest was canceled due to the COVID-19 pandemic, which caused the winner of Miss World Canada 2020 to compete at Miss World 2021 instead, and the 2021 national contest was also delayed, the organizer then decided to hold an ad hoc virtual contest to determine the country representative for Miss Grand International 2021. The contest featured 23 national finalists, in which a Ukrainian-Canadian model, Olga Bykadorova, was announced as the winner.

== Editions ==
=== Location and date ===
The Miss Grand Canada was organized as a stand-alone pageant three times; in 2017 and 2018 by the Di Benedetto Model agency, and the online pageant in 2021 by the MTC-W Inc.

Edition	Date	Final venue	Entrants	Ref.
1st	16 July 2017	Holiday Inn Express & Suites Calgary, Calgary	12	
2nd	26 August 2018	Chinese Cultural Center, Calgary	15	
3rd	18 June 2021	Online pageant	23	

== International competition ==
The following is a list of Canadian representatives at the Miss Grand International contest.

Color keys

- : Declared as the winner
- : Ended as a runner-up (Top 5)
- : Ended as a finalist (Top 10)
- : Ended as a semifinalist (Top 20/21)
- : Ended as special awards winner

Year	Province	Miss Grand Canada	National qualification	Placement	Special Awards	Notes	National Director
2026	British Columbia	Patricia Seward	Miss Grand Canada 2026	Unplaced		List: Previously crowned Miss World British Columbia 2022 and Miss Intercontinental Canada 2022 (Unplaced at Miss Intercontinental 2022).; Placed 3rd runner-up at Miss Universe Canada 2026 and received the Humanitarian Award.	Michelle Weswaldi
2025	British Columbia	Layanna Robinson	Miss Grand Canada 2025 (Note: Supplemental title in the Miss World Canada pageant.)	Unplaced	Top 10-Swimsuit competition (Judge's Choice)	List: Previously crowned Miss Earth Canada 2023 (Top 20 at Miss Earth 2023).	Michelle Weswaldi
2024	Ontario	Alivia Croal	Miss Grand Canada 2024	Unplaced	Top 15-Grand Voice award		Michelle Weswaldi
2023	Saskatchewan	Yuliya Shcherban	Miss Grand Canada 2023	Unplaced		List: 2nd runner-up at Miss Universe Canada 2022.	Michelle Weswaldi
2022	Alberta	Mildred Rincon	Miss Grand Canada 2022	Unplaced	Top 10 Selected by the Judges-Best National Costume	List: Later won Miss Fitness Supermodel World 2025, competed at Reina Hispanoamericana 2025 (Unplaced; Miss Congeniality).; Top 10 at Miss Universe Canada 2023 and Miss Universe Canada 2024.	Michelle Weswaldi
2021	Quebec	Olga Bykadorova	Miss Grand Canada 2021	Unplaced		List: Top 15 at Top Model of the World 2021 and also competed Miss Multiverse 2020.; Previously placed in the Top 15 and Top 8 at Miss World Canada 2019 and Miss World Canada 2020, respectively.; Later placed 4th runner-up and Top 10 at Miss Universe Canada 2023 and Miss Universe Canada 2024, respectively.	Michelle Weswaldi
2020	British Columbia	Sara Winter	Miss Grand Canada 2020	Unplaced		List: Previously competed at Supermodel International 2012 and Top 15 at Top Model of the World 2014.; 1st runner-up at Miss World Canada 2020.; Competed at Miss Universe Canada thrice, Top 20 at Miss Universe Canada 2014, Top 10 at Both Miss Universe Canada 2019 and Miss Universe Canada 2020, respectively.; Previously competed at Miss Teen Canada 2011 (Miss Photogenic).	Michelle Weswaldi
2019	Quebec	Brianna Plouffe	Appointed	Unplaced		List: 1st runner-up at Miss Globe Canada 2019.	Michelle Weswaldi
2018	Ontario	Veronica Rodriguez	Miss Grand Canada 2018	Did not compete			Angelo Di Benedetto
2018	Ontario	Grace Diamani	Finalist Miss Grand Canada 2018	Unplaced		List: Replacement of the formerly crowned winner Veronica Rodriguez, Miss Grand Canada 2018.; Previously crowned Miss Glamour Look International Canada 2018 at the finale of Miss Grand Canada 2018.	Angelo Di Benedetto
2017	Ontario	Maddison Fysh	Miss Grand Canada 2017	Did not compete			Angelo Di Benedetto
2017	Alberta	Natalie Allin	Top 6 Miss World Canada 2017	Unplaced		List: Later competed at Miss Cosmo World 2019.; Top 5 at Miss World Canada 2017.; Top 12 at Miss Earth Canada 2019	Angelo Di Benedetto
2016	Alberta	Monika Horvat	Appointed	Unplaced		List: Unplaced at Miss Universe Canada 2015.	Angelo Di Benedetto
By Rosotro Productions (Miss Earth Canada); 2013–2015
2015	Ontario	Jade Caron	Finalist Miss Earth Canada 2015	Unplaced		List: 3rd Runner-up at Miss Earth Canada 2015.	Ronaldo Soriano Trono
2014	Alberta	Kathryn Kohut	Finalist Miss Earth Canada 2014	2nd runner-up		List: Unplaced at Miss International 2015.; Competed at Miss Universe Canada thrice, 1st runner-up and 4th runner-up at Miss Universe Canada 2015 and Miss Universe Canada 2017, respectively. Unplaced at Miss Universe Canada 2013.; 1st runner-up at Miss Earth Canada 2014.	Ronaldo Soriano Trono
2013	Ontario	Natalie Carriere	Finalist Miss Earth Canada 2013	Unplaced	Top 20 Best in Swimsuit	List: Top 15 at Miss Asia Pacific International 2016.; Winner of Miss North Ontario 2011 and Canada’s Perfect Miss 2015.; Competed at Miss Earth Canada thrice, 1st Runner-up at Miss Earth Canada 2020 (Virtual Edition) and 4th Runner-up at Both Miss Earth Canada 2013 and Miss Earth Canada 2016.; Top 10 at Miss World Canada 2018 (Beauty with a Purpose Award Winner) and Top 20 at Miss Universe Canada 2016.; Previously Top 10 at Miss Teen Canada World 2010 (Also won Miss Teen Ontario North 2009 & Miss Teen Ontario 2009 ).	Ronaldo Soriano Trono

=== Winners by Province ===
Province	Titles	Winning Years
Ontario	4	2013, 2015, 2018, 2024
Alberta	3	2014, 2017, 2022
British Columbia	3	2020, 2025, 2026
Quebec	2	2019, 2021
Saskatchewan	1	2016

== Gallery ==
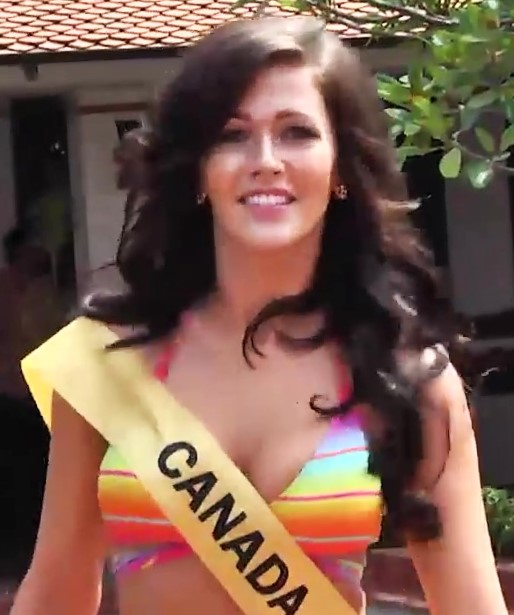
Miss Grand Canada 2014
Kathryn Kohut

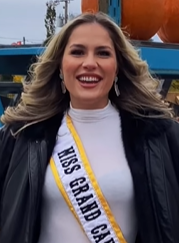
Miss Grand Canada 2021
Olga Bykadorova

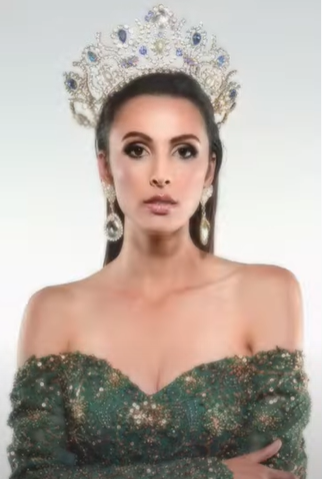
Miss Grand Canada 2022
Mildred Rincon

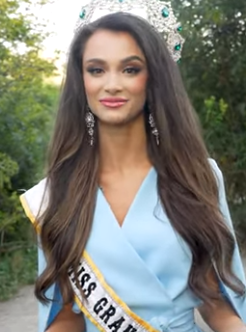
Miss Grand Canada 2023
Yuliya Shcherban

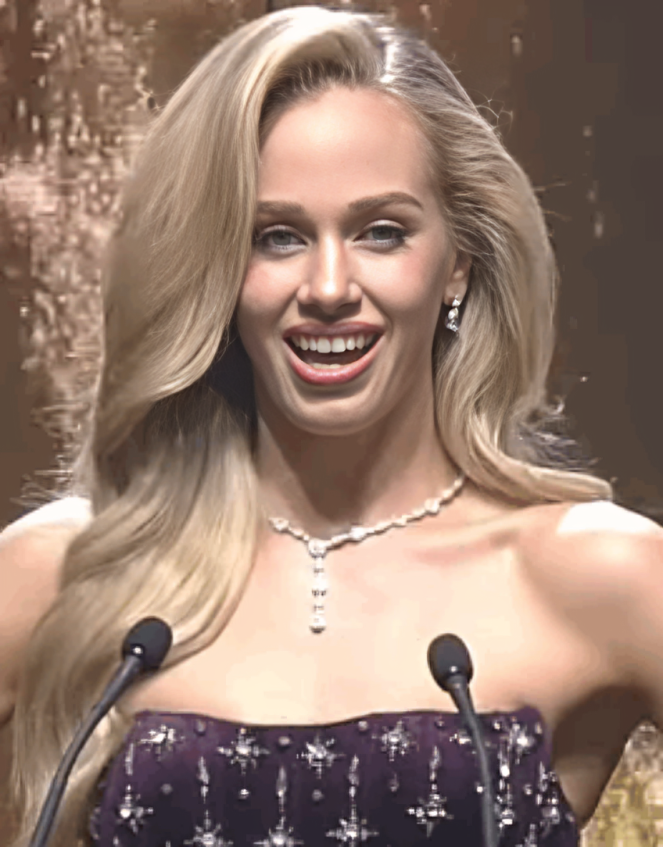
Miss Grand Canada 2024
Alivia Croal

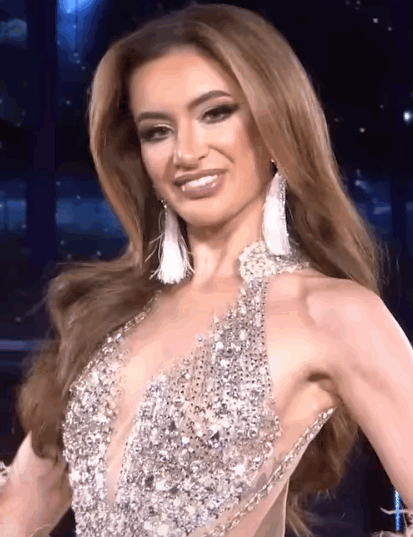
Miss Grand Canada 2025
Layanna Robinson
