= Mr World Canada =

National male beauty pageant competition in Canada

- Formation: 2007; 19 years ago
- Type: NGO
- Purpose: Carries a message of style and purpose, embodying qualities of resilience, confidence, and a commitment to making a positive national impact.
- Headquarters: Toronto
- Location: Canada
- Members: Mister World
- Official language: English; French
- Affiliations: Miss World Canada

Mr World Canada (sometimes informally referred to as Mr Canada) is a Canadian male beauty pageant that runs in parallel with the Miss World Canada pageant, the two sending their winners to compete in the Mister World and Miss World pageants respectively.

== Winners ==
- 2007: Darren Storsley of Langley, British Columbia, the organizer of the Miss BC World pageant, was named Mr. World Canada in 2007.
- 2010: Ron Wear of Edmonton, Alberta, a Canadian model and actor, won the competition in 2010. Wear went on to compete in Mister World 2010, but he did not win. Wear attested to his Mr. World Canada duties preventing him from pursuing an acting career to the extent that he would have liked. He won Mister International Canada in 2012.
- 2012: Frankie Cena of Burnaby, British Columbia won the Mr. World Canada competition in 2012. When he represented Canada at Mister World 2012, Cena ranked first at the talent show, second in the multimedia competition, and tenth overall. While Mr. World Canada, Cena sang at the Warmth of Light Musical Banquet hosted by Miss World Canada contestant Selina Yue. He went on to co-host multiple Mr. World and Miss World competitions.
- 2014: Jin Stewart of Vancouver, British Columbia won the Mr. World Canada competition in 2014. He later hosted Miss World Canada in 2015 and won Mister Global Canada in 2016.
- 2015: Jinder Atwal of Terrace, British Columbia was named Mr. World Canada in 2015.
- 2019: Alessandro Coward of Vancouver, British Columbia won the competition in 2019. He spoke openly about his struggles with his autism diagnosis.
- 2024: Travis Edward of Halifax, Nova Scotia is an East Coast Canadian model and performer.

== Representatives at Mister World Canada ==
=== Mister World ===
Color key

- : Declared as Winner
- : Ended as runner-up or top 5/6 qualification
- : Ended as one of the finalists or semifinalists
- : Ended as special awards

Year	Mister World Canada	Represented	Placement at Mister World	Special Awards
2007	Darren Storsley	Langley, British Columbia	Unplaced	
2010	Ron Wear	Edmonton, Alberta	Unplaced	
2012	Francesco "Frankie" Anthony Cena	Burnaby, British Columbia	Top 5	Talent & Creativity
2014	Jin Stewart	Vancouver, British Columbia	Unplaced	
2016	Jinder Atwal	Terrace, British Columbia	Unplaced	
2019	Alessandro Coward	Vancouver, British Columbia	Unplaced	
2024	Travis Edward	Halifax, Nova Scotia	Unplaced	

== See also ==
- Miss World Canada
- Miss Universe Canada
- Miss Canada
- Miss Earth Canada
