= Danielle House =

Canadian model (born 1976)

Danielle House (born 1976 in Daniel's Harbour, Newfoundland) was crowned Miss Newfoundland in 1995 and Miss Canada International in 1996. House was stripped of her Miss Canada International title when she was convicted of assaulting in a bar a woman who was dating her ex-boyfriend.

== Personal life ==
House was born in Daniel's Harbour, Newfoundland, Canada. She studied nursing at Memorial University, Newfoundland.

In a 2021 interview, House says she now lives in California, working in healthcare. She married an American man in 2002. They have two sons and one daughter.

== Career ==
She was the guest Chicken Cannon shooter on the November 22, 1996 episode of Air Farce. Later, she achieved greater exposure in a nude pictorial for Playboy magazine's December 1997 issue. The issue referred to her with the mistaken title "Miss Canada". However, the last "Miss Canada" was named for 1992. In 2000 she co-starred in the film Solid Cover 2.

== See also ==
- List of people of Newfoundland and Labrador
