= Bradford, Ontario =

Community in Ontario, Canada

Bradford
- Unincorporated community (dissolved town)
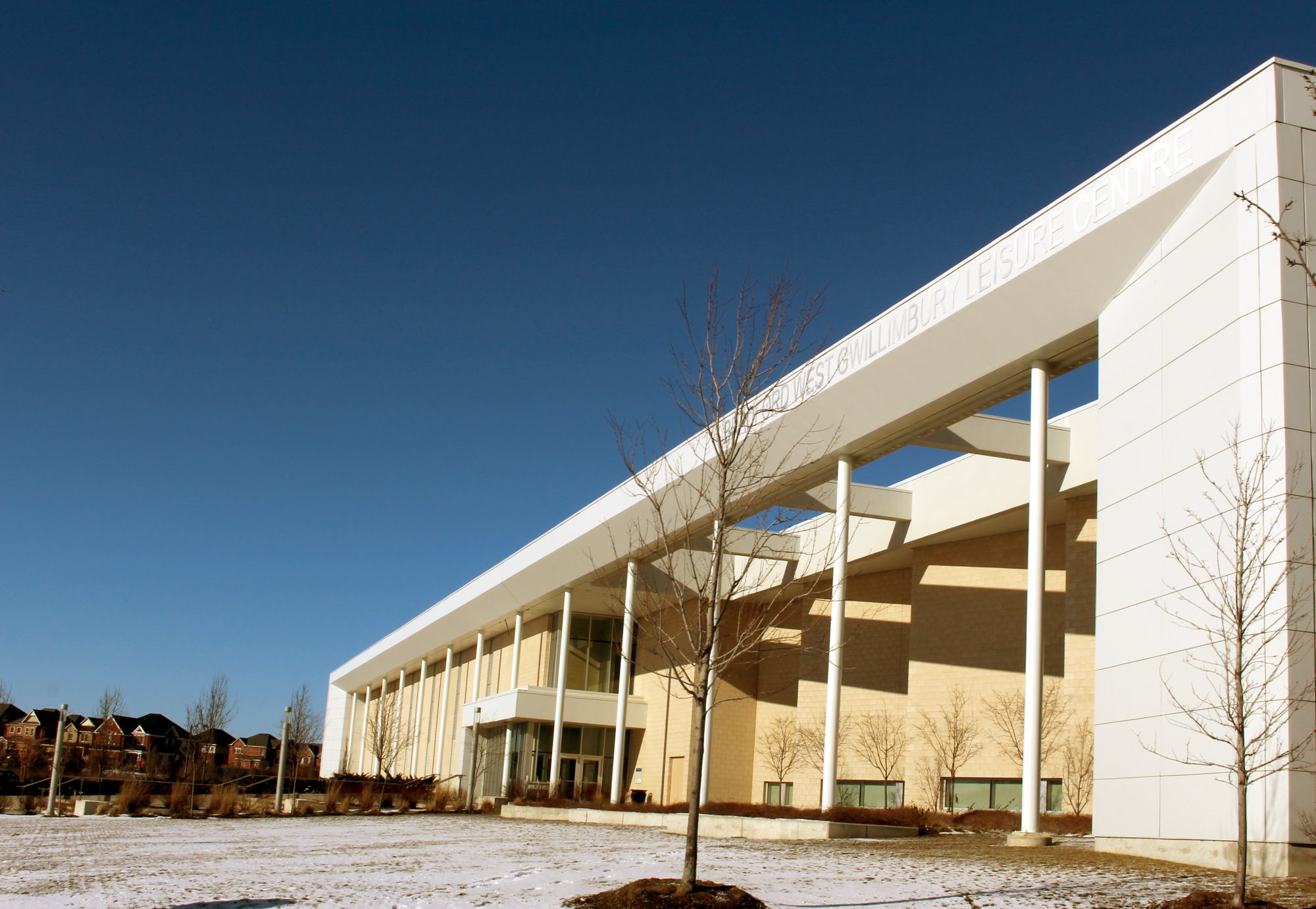
- Bradford West Gwillimbury Leisure Centre

- Location within Southern Ontario
- Coordinates: 44°07′N 79°34′W
- Country: Canada
- Province: Ontario
- County: Simcoe
- Municipality: Bradford West Gwillimbury
- Settled: 1819
- Incorporated: 1857
- Dissolved (amalgamated): January 1, 1991
- Named for: Bradford, England

Government
  - Fed. riding: New Tecumseth—Gwillimbury
  - Prov. riding: York—Simcoe

Area
  - Land: 16.10 km^{2} (6.22 sq mi)

Population (2021)
  - Total: 38,128
  - Density: 2,368.2/km^{2} (6,134/sq mi)
- Time zone: UTC-5 (EST)
  - Summer (DST): UTC-4 (EDT)
- Postal code FSA: L3Z
- Area codes: 905

Bradford is the primary country urban area of the Town of Bradford West Gwillimbury, Ontario, in Canada. It overlooks a farming community, known as The Holland Marsh, located on the Holland River that flows into Lake Simcoe.

== History ==
The eastern boundary of Bradford is the Holland River, named for Samuel Holland, first Surveyor General of British North America, who passed this way on an exploration from Toronto to Balsam Lake, by way of Lake Simcoe, in 1791.

For several years the Holland River and Lake Simcoe provided the only means of transportation. Holland Landing was the northern terminus of Yonge Street. The military route to Georgian Bay during the War of 1812 crossed Lake Simcoe to Kempenfelt Bay, then by the Nine Mile Portage to Willow Creek and the Nottawasaga River. The Penetanguishene Road, built between 1814 and 1815 from Kempenfelt Bay, provided an alternate route to Georgian Bay. However, early settlers also used this route to get to the frontier of Simcoe County, bypassing the areas of West Gwillimbury and Essa townships.

The first settlers to cross the Holland River, arriving in the fall of 1819, were three Irishmen: James Wallace, Lewis Algeo and Robert Armstrong. This was about the same time as the Auld Kirk Scotch Settlement was established. However, the pioneers of West Gwillimbury were mostly Protestants from Northern Ireland.

The new settlers sent a petition to the province of Upper Canada early in 1824, stating they were separated from the settlements of Yonge Street, by an impassable swamp. On January 24 the Legislative Assembly of Upper Canada made a grant for the first main road in West Gwillimbury (4 Geo. 1V., chap 29). The contract for the first corduroy road across the Holland Marsh was completed by Robert Armstrong and his sons in the fall of 1825. Connecting with other contactors sections and the previously constructed road from Kempenfelt Bay, the road became known as Penetanguishene Road. It later became part of Yonge Street, and is now Simcoe County Road 4.

The original road (Bridge Street) did not curve onto Holland Street, but continued straight to what is now Scanlon Ave. near Colborne Street; from there the road continued north, while another road led southwest to the Scottish settlement. It was at this junction that the settlement was first established. William Milloy, formerly of Coulson's Corners, built a small log tavern there in the fall of 1829. Other businessmen included James Drury, merchant; James Campbell, shoemaker and Thomas Driffel, blacksmith. John Peacock, an old soldier from London, England, had settled as a merchant and became the first postmaster in 1835.

=== Name ===
Initially, the place was known as Milloy's Tavern and later was called Edmanson's Corners. In 1840, Joel Flesher Robinson named it after his home town in West Yorkshire, England.

=== Bradford becomes a town ===
Bradford was incorporated as a village in 1857, with a population of about 1,000 people. Only a few years prior to this, the Northern Railway of Canada was built through the town. The train station was constructed by the Grand Trunk Railway and later used by the CNR. Bradford was incorporated as a town in 1960.

The Downtown Core has survived two fires. The first, on May 23, 1871, destroyed upwards of one hundred homes including all of the business part of the village except two hotels being consumed. However, a new downtown area arose where most buildings were made of brick. Today many of the buildings still exist and make up the downtown core. The second fire was in the 1960s with damage only to the northwest corner of the intersection at Highway 11 and Highway 88.

One of its famous historical landmarks that still operates to this day is the Village Inn Hotel. Its architect was E. J. Lennox, one of Toronto's foremost architects who also built Toronto's Old City Hall, the West Wing of the Ontario Legislative Building (known as Queen's Park), and the King Edward Hotel. The Village Inn is situated at the crossroads of Highway 88 and Highway 11, and is the landmark at the four corners of Bradford. Food, lodgings, and hospitality serve as its trademark. This history goes back to the 1900s, to horse and buggy days, when the Village Inn was a favourite meeting place for local residents and travellers en route for other parts of the country. The building survived a couple of fires including the great downtown fire of 1957. In 1980, it was hit by a crane that was trying to negotiate the intersection. It has since been extensively remodeled.

=== Early industry ===
The village of Bradford was established to supply the agricultural interests of its surrounding area, and for a brief period in the mid-19th century, lumbering was a major industry, as trees had to be removed in order to commence farming.

In 1824 entrepreneurs John Thorpe and Mark Scanlon obtained a government grant for the construction of a grist mill on a stream north of the settlement; although the partnership was dissolved about 1832, Scanlon built two sawmills in that vicinity. Water power being the only means of motive power at the time, as many as six mills were located on Scanlon Creek at one time. The family of Thomas Maconchy, one of the early settlers of Gilford, built a sawmill in Bradford at the bridge over the Holland River, in 1840. It was the first mill at that location.

When the Ontario, Simcoe and Huron Railway was constructed, it was said to be through an almost continuous forest for most of the distance from Toronto to Barrie. Sometime after the line opened, Toronto lumber merchant Thompson Smith put up a large sawmill on the river near the Bradford station. First evidence of Smith in the village was 1862 when his partner James Durham cut the Holland River bridge in two, while driving logs to the mill.

Thompson Smith's mill was the second largest in the area, next to the Sage mill at Bell Ewart. Smith added a second mill at Bradford, as well as contracting with Durham's mill in Barrie. Only a decade after the arrival of the railway at Lake Simcoe, pine for the mills was running low. In 1867 H. W. Sage persuaded Thompson Smith to join with him in the formation of the Rama Timber Transport Company, to supply Lake Simcoe mills with timber. With logs coming from as distant as Head Lake, Smith put up a third mill, south of the Holland River bridge in 1869.

Following an example set by American lumberman Henry W. Sage, Thompson Smith established a number of mills at Cheboygan, Michigan.

In 1923, William Henry Day began the drainage system that turned the wetlands of the Holland Marsh into arable land, which now consists of thousands of acres where fresh vegetables are grown.

== Demographics ==
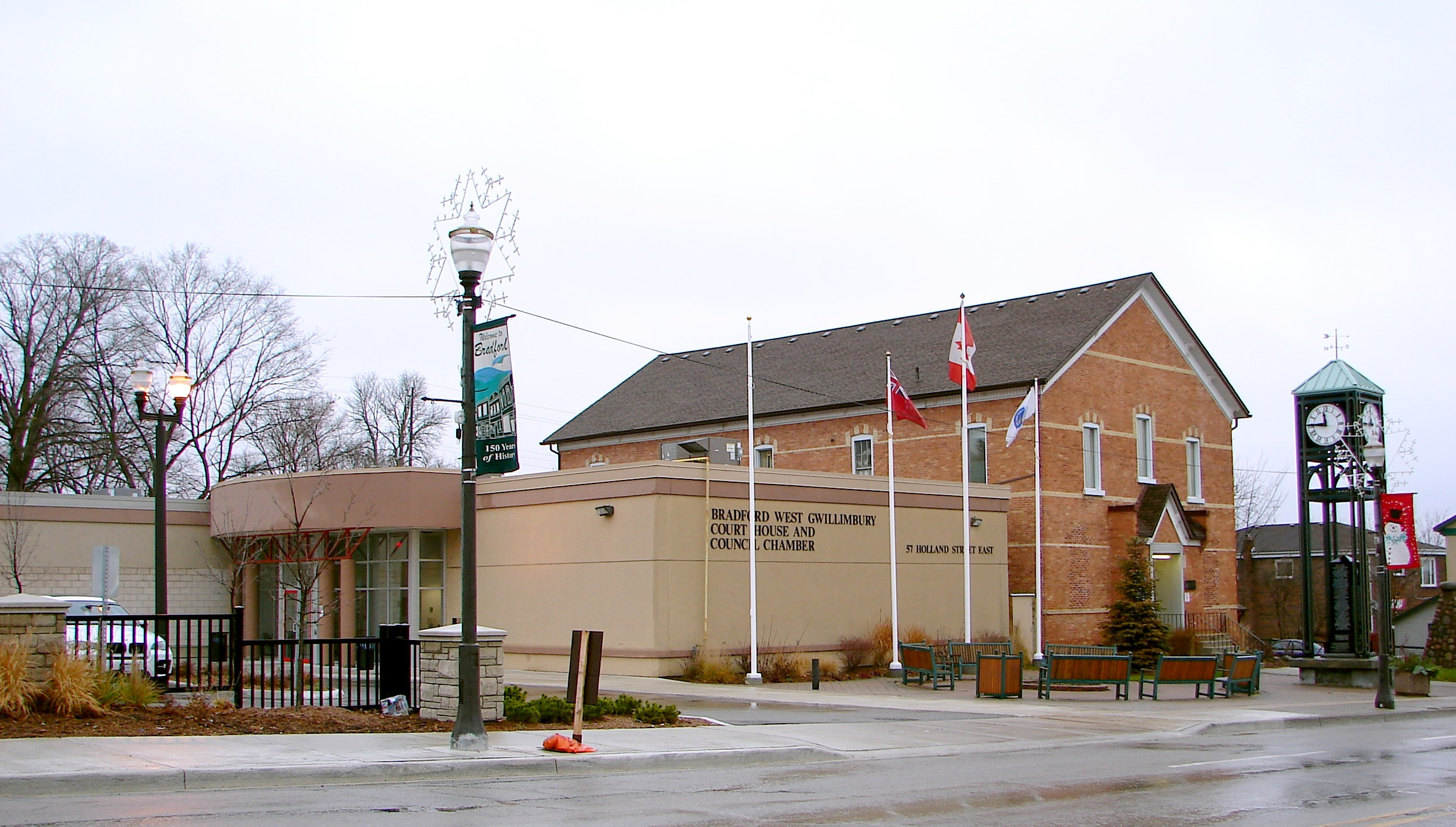
Bradford Court House

In the 2021 Canadian census, the population centre of Bradford had a population of 38,128 in an area of 16.10 square kilometres (6.22 sq mi), and occupying 11,809 private dwellings out of 12,210 total dwellings.

The 2006 Statistics Canada Census lists the population of Bradford West Gwillimbury (the local census unit) as 24,039.

Bradford West Gwillimbury has people from many different backgrounds ranging from Portugal, Italy, the Netherlands, Germany, United Kingdom, Hungary, and Ukraine. The overwhelming majority of Bradford's residents are of European descent.

Historical census populations – Bradford (Population centre)

Year	Pop.	±%
1871	1,130	—
1881	1,176	+4.1%
1891	996	−15.3%
1901	984	−1.2%
1911	946	−3.9%
1921	961	+1.6%
1931	972	+1.1%

Year	Pop.	±%
1941	1,033	+6.3%
1951	1,483	+43.6%
1956	2,010	+35.5%
1961	2,342	+16.5%
1966	2,529	+8.0%
1971	3,401	+34.5%
1976	5,080	+49.4%

Year	Pop.	±%
1981	7,370	+45.1%
1986	8,825	+19.7%
2001	16,978	+92.4%
2006	19,212	+13.2%
2011	22,378	+16.5%
2016	30,765	+37.5%
2021	38,128	+23.9%

Population counts prior to 1991 are for Bradford (Town).
Source: Statistics Canada

== Transportation ==
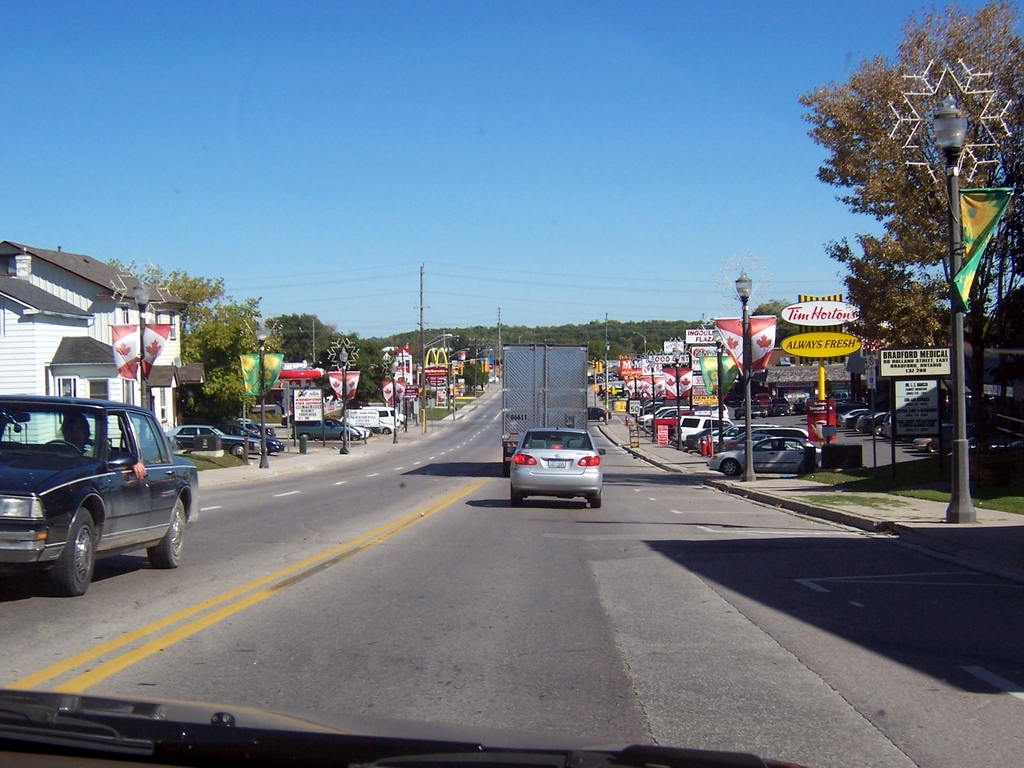
Holland St. East (Cty. Rd. 88) in Bradford on a Saturday afternoon.

Bradford's downtown core is situated at the intersection of former Highway 11 (now, County Road 4) and 88 (now, County Road 88). County Road 88 interchanges with Highway 400, a limited-access freeway that connects to Toronto in the south and "cottage country" in the north. This portion of Highway 11 is one of the few connecting routes between Highway 404 to the east and the 400 to the west, creating considerable through traffic. It can be tough to drive through the town on long weekends.

The town's local transit services consist of 2 bus routes, which are operated by the town's local bus service, BWG Transit. GO Transit has bus routes that connect the town to Barrie and Newmarket, and Bradford also has a station on GO Transit's commuter train network. The GO Train service had its first inaugural run through Bradford in 1982. At the time, the commuter train went as far north as Barrie. Over the years the service to Barrie was stopped. This caused Bradford to be a terminus for the commuter trains to Toronto. However, the City of Barrie purchased the rail line north of Bradford with the hope of reintroducing rail service to Barrie. GO Train service resumed as of December 2007 to the city of Barrie.

== Sports ==
Bradford has two junior hockey teams that play in the GMHL; the Bradford Bulls and the Bradford Rattlers.

== Education ==
There are 13 schools in the town, including two secondary schools:

- Bradford District High School (Public)
- Holy Trinity High School (Catholic).

Elementary schools include:

- Chris Hadfield Public School
- Fred C. Cook Public School
- Fieldcrest Elementary School
- Harvest Hills Public School
- Hon. Earl Rowe Public School
- Marie of the Incarnation Catholic School
- St. Teresa of Calcutta Catholic School
- Sir William Osler Public School
- St. Charles Catholic School
- St. Jean de Brebeuf Catholic School
- St. Angela Merici Catholic School
- W.H Day Elementary School
- Marshview Public School

There are no university or college campuses in Bradford.

== Notable people ==
- Scott Cavalheiro, actor and filmmaker
- Denise Garrido, Miss Earth Canada 2008 and Miss World Canada 2010
- Mike Kilkenny, major league baseball player
- Brandon Mashinter, NHL hockey player with the Chicago Blackhawks
- Ambrose Small, millionaire entrepreneur who mysteriously disappeared in December 1919
- Rob Zepp, hockey player with the Eisbären Berlin of the DEL
