= Riza Santos =

Canadian actress

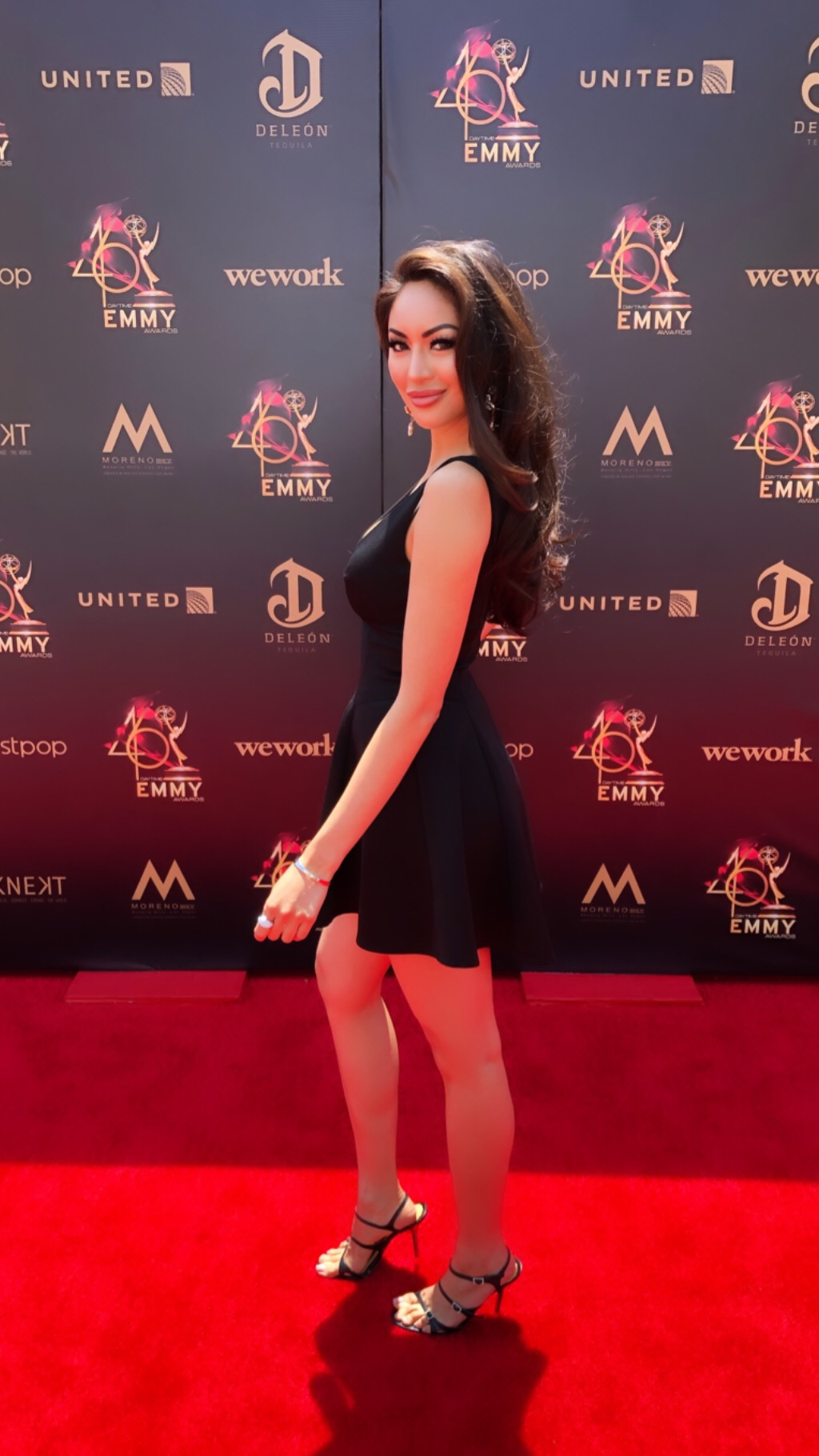
- Riza Raquel Santos at the 2019 Daytime Emmy Awards.
- Born: Riza Raquel Santos; August 31, 1989 (age 37); Calgary, Alberta, Canada
- Height: 1.70 m (5 ft 7 in)
- Beauty pageant titleholder
- Title: Miss Earth Canada 2006; Miss World Canada 2011; Miss Universe Canada 2013
- Hair colour: Black
- Eye colour: Brown
- Major competitions: Miss Earth Canada 2006 (Winner); Miss Earth 2006 (Unplaced); Miss Aura International 2006 (4th Runner-Up); Miss World Canada 2011 (Winner); Miss World 2011 (Top 31); Miss Universe Canada 2013 (Winner); Miss Universe 2013 (Unplaced); Miss Global Philippines 2019 (Winner); Miss Global 2019 (3rd Runner-Up)
- Website: www.rizaraquel.com

Riza Raquel Santos (born August 31, 1986) is a Canadian former actress, TV host, model and beauty pageant titleholder. She is currently the Vice President of Argyle Fox Inc., a technology firm headquartered in Calgary. She achieved the "Canada's Triple Crown": Miss Earth Canada 2006, Miss World Canada 2011 and Miss Universe Canada 2013.

== Personal life ==
Santos was born and raised in Calgary, Alberta. She is of Filipino descent.

As an advocate for environmental protection, Santos worked with the Canadian International Development Agency upon graduating high school. She also served with the Canadian Forces Army Reserve. Riza attended Rocky Mountain Bible and the University of Calgary's Schulich School of Engineering.

== Television experience ==
During her participation with Pinoy Big Brother: Celebrity Edition 2, she played for Bantay Bata, ABS-CBN Foundation's charitable institution. On Day 84, she was proclaimed the second-place winner of the show. In 2008 and 2009, she hosted the Asian Poker Tour. She has made several other television and film appearances.

== Pageant career ==
Santos was a Triple National Pageant winner, having gone on to compete in three of the Big Four international beauty pageants. She competed and won Miss Earth Canada 2006, Miss World Canada 2011 and most recently Miss Universe Canada 2013. She competed in the Miss Earth 2006 pageant, in which she was given the Miss Earth Photogenic 2006, Miss Earth Talent 2006 Finalist, 5 Special Awards, after that she gain the right to represent Canada in Miss Aura International 2006, where she ended as the 4th Runner-Up. She also competed in Miss World 2011 contest, where she placed 30th out of 120 contestants and she also placed 4th in the Sport Talent competition. She later represented Canada at the Miss Universe 2013 competition in Moscow, Russia.

=== Miss Universe Canada 2013 ===
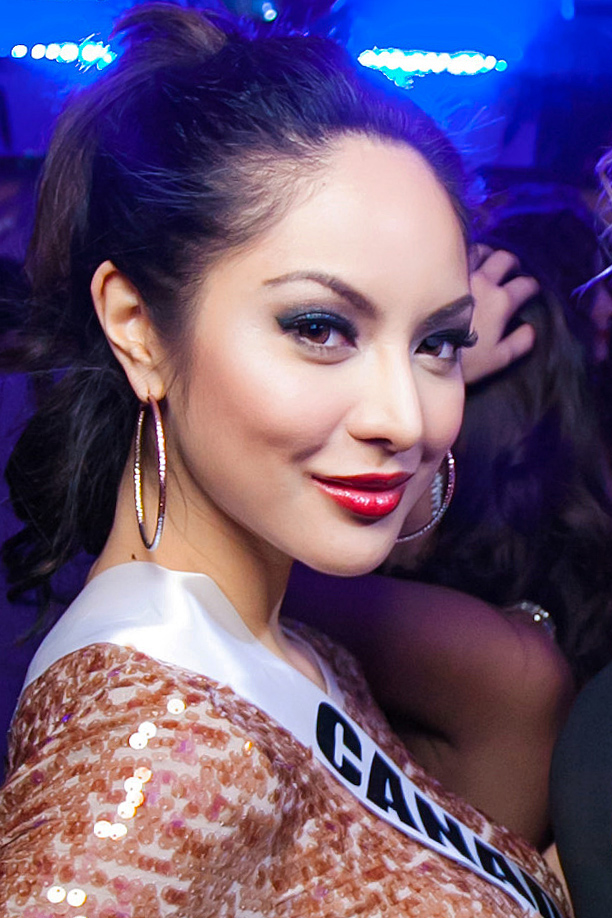
Riza Santos at the Miss Universe 2013 in Moscow

Santos competed at the 2013 edition of Miss Universe Canada held in Toronto where she was hailed 1st Runner up to Denise Garrido. However, 24 hours later, it was later revealed that she originally won due to a typo error in the ratings of the Top 5 entries, which afterwards, significantly impacted the final results of the competition. A week later, she was officially crowned as the new Miss Universe Canada 2013 in her hometown, Calgary, Alberta. This is the first instance of this type of error in the 11 years that Beauties of Canada (BOC) has produced the Miss Universe Canada pageant. Garrido has actually ranked as third runner-up.

== Filmography ==
=== Film ===
Year	Title	Role	Ref.
2008	When Love Begins	Christine	
2008	Ikaw Pa Rin: Bongga ka boy!	Miss Canada	
2008	Dobol Trobol: Lets Get Redi 2 Rambol!	Boni	
2014	Water Wars	Eryn	
2015	Painkillers	Madelline	

=== Television ===
Year	Title	Role	Ref.
2007	Pinoy Big Brother: Celebrity Edition 2	Celebrity Housemate; Runner-up	
2008	ASAP	Herself (singer/dancer)	
2008	Love Spell	Living Doll	
2008	Palos	Lady Simona	
2008	Lovebooks Presents	Giselle	
2008	Miss Earth	Television Host	
2008	I Love Betty La Fea	Amanda (model)	
2008–09	Asian Poker Tour	Official Television Host	
2015	The King of Fighters 2000: 10 YEARS AFTER	Bonne Jenet (voice only)	

== Notes ==
Awards and achievements
Preceded by Katherine McClure	Miss Earth Canada; 2006	Succeeded by Jessica Trisko
Preceded by Denise Garrido	Miss World Canada; 2011	Succeeded by Tara Teng
Preceded by Sahar Biniaz	Miss Universe Canada; 2013	Succeeded by Chanel Beckenlehner
Preceded by (Haiti) Seydina Allen	3rd Runner-up Miss Global; 2019	Succeeded by (Lithuania) Sandra Boris
