= Emma Morrison (pageant titleholder) =

First indigenous person to win Miss Canada

- Beauty pageant titleholder
- Title: Miss World Canada 2022 Miss World Canada Beauty with a Purpose 2022
- Hair color: Brown
- Eye color: Brown
- Major competition: Miss World Canada 2022 (Winner)

Emma Morrison (born 2000) is a Canadian pageant titleholder and the first indigenous person to win Miss Teenage Canada, in 2017, and Miss World Canada, in 2022.

== Biography ==
Born to Roland Morrison & Vanessa Bedard, Morrison is originally from Chapleau, Ontario, Canada and identifies as Mushkegowuk Cree First Nations woman. At present, she lives in Ottawa, Canada. Morrison studied Indigenous preparatory studies and tourism as well as aesthetics and hair.

== Pageantry ==
Morrison began competing in pageants in 2017 when she entered in the Miss North Ontario Regional Canada. One of three Indigenous contestants of the total 39 competitors, Morrison won the pageant, claiming the title Miss North Ontario.

Ten months later, in 2018, she competed and won Miss Teenage Canada and went on to represent Canada at her first international pageant, Miss Teenager Universe in 2018. She did not place, nor receive any awards.

In 2022, of 50 competitors, Morrison won Miss World Canada, and also received the Beauty with a Purpose award, for her ribbon skirts. She went on to represent Canada in the 72nd Miss World competition in 2023. While she did not place, she is notable for being the first Indigenous woman to represent Canada at the pageant.

== Awards ==
- Miss World Canada 2022
- Miss World Canada 2022 Beauty With A Purpose Award
- Miss Teenage Canada in August 2018
- Miss Northern Ontario 2017
