= Denise Garrido =

Canadian model and beauty pageant titleholder

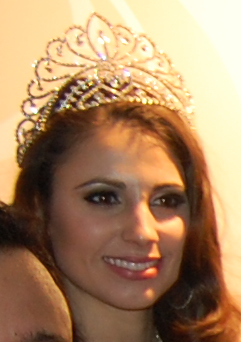
- Garrido in 2011
- Born: Denise Garrido; December 8, 1986 (age 39); Bradford, Ontario, Canada
- Height: 1.75 m (5 ft 9 in)
- Beauty pageant titleholder
- Title: Miss Earth Canada 2008; Miss World Canada 2010; Mrs Galaxy Canada 2020–21; Mrs Galaxy Northern Canada 2023
- Hair colour: Brown
- Eye colour: Brown
- Major competitions: Miss Earth Canada 2008 (Winner); Miss Earth 2008 (Unplaced); Miss World Canada 2010 (Winner); Miss World 2010 (Top 25); Miss Universe Canada 2013 (3rd runner-up); Mrs Galaxy Northern Canada 2023 (Winner); Mrs Galaxy Canada 2020–21 (Winner)

Denise Garrido (born December 8, 1986) is a Canadian model and beauty pageant titleholder. Garrido was the first Canadian to win two National Grand Slam Pageants, Miss Earth Canada 2008 and Miss World Canada 2010, and she appeared to be the first to win all three National Grand Slam Pageants when she was wrongly crowned as Miss Universe Canada 2013. However, it was discovered the following day that there had been a human error when entering the final scores. This error changed the final order of the Top 5. By the judges' score cards, Garrido had placed 3rd runner-up. Only 24 hours after being crowned, Garrido handed over her crown and sash to Riza Santos, the rightful Miss Universe Canada 2013. She went on to win Miss Galaxy Canada in 2020 and held the title for two years 2021. Currently, she is Miss Galaxy Canada Northern Canada 2023.

== Early life and career ==
Denise Garrido studied biomedical sciences at Laurentian University. Her parents are Portuguese and Brazilian.

Garrido won Miss Earth Canada in 2008. She continued on to the Miss Earth 2008 in Manila, Philippines, where she did not place, but won the Miss Puerto Princesa swimsuit award.

Garrido won Miss World Canada in 2010, and she was one of the Top 25 semi-finalists, out of 115 countries, at the Miss World 2010 in Sanya, China. She also placed Top 10 in talent and Top 20 in sport.

Garrido was crowned Miss Universe Canada 2013 during the 11th edition of the pageant held in Toronto on May 25. However, on 27 May 2013, two days after the pageant, it was publicly announced that an error had been uncovered. Pageant director Denis Davila stated, "During the validation of the computerized scoring results (which occurs the following day), a typo was discovered in the top five entries, which significantly impacted the final results of the competition." After the results were corrected, Calgary's Riza Santos was named the winner and Garrido the 3rd runner-up.

From November 2011 through January 2012, Garrido toured throughout India with the children's charity "Healthy Kids, Happy Kids". Founded by Satish Sikha, they provided food, clothing and medical treatment to thousands of children in need.

== Notes ==
Originally held the title for 24 hours but was replaced by Riza Santos due to a human input error when entering final scores.

Awards and achievements
Preceded by Jessica Trisko	Miss Earth Canada; 2008	Succeeded by Lateesha Ector
Preceded by Lena Ma	Miss World Canada; 2010	Succeeded by Riza Santos
Preceded by Sahar Biniaz	Miss Universe Canada; 2013	Succeeded by Riza Santos
