= Claudia Arce =

Bolivian actress, singer, model

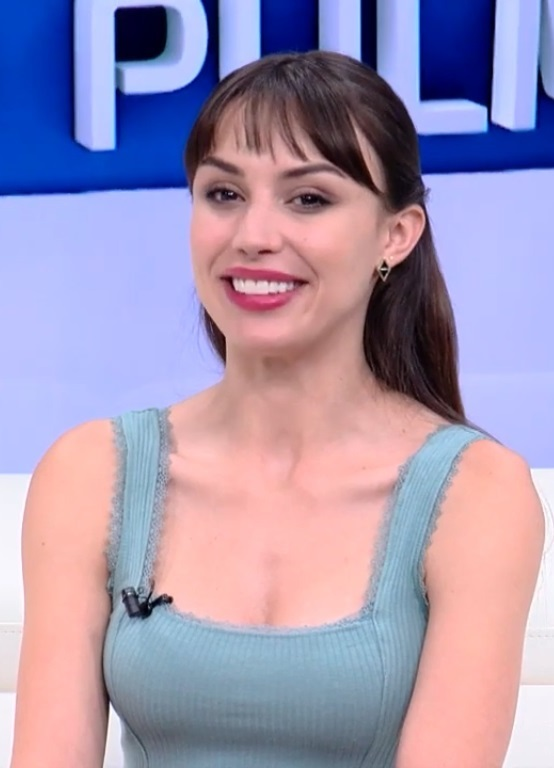
- Born: Claudia Arce Lemaitre; 4 April 1991 (age 35); Sucre, Bolivia
- Occupations: Actress, model
- Height: 1.725 m (5 ft 8 in)
- Beauty pageant titleholder
- Title: Miss Bolivia 2009
- Years active: 2009–present
- Major competitions: Miss Bolivia 2009 (Winner); Miss Universe 2010 (Unplaced)
- Website: www.claudiaarce.quieresapostar.com

Claudia Arce Lemaitre (born April 4, 1991 in Sucre, Bolivia) is a Bolivian actress, singer, model and beauty pageant titleholder who was crowned Miss Bolivia 2009, representing the Department of Chuquisaca. In the development of the contest she won titles as Yanbal Face Best Smile and Best National Costume. Claudia stood for Bolivia in the Queen of the World 2009 contest held at Berlin, Germany, and also in Miss Universe 2010, without success. She was the first woman born in Bolivia's Department of Chuquisaca who participated in Miss Universe.

== Early life ==
Claudia Arce was born on April 4, 1991, in the city of Sucre, Bolivia. She is the daughter of Marcelo Arce Scott and Denisse Lourdes Lemaitre Zilvetti. Arce is a direct descendant of Aniceto Arce, a Bolivian lawyer and politician who served as the 22nd president of Bolivia from 1888 to 1892.

She began studying industrial engineering but then switched to business administration at Private University of Valley.

Claudia also won the first place in her country's national competitions of Physics, Chemistry, Astronomy and Astrophysics held between 2005 and 2007. In 2008 she was nominated for the International Olympiad on Astronomy and Astrophysics in Indonesia.

She speaks three languages: English, German, and Spanish.

She was a special guest on the Bicentennial of the first cry for freedom in South America in her hometown, Sucre, as well as on the Bicentennial anniversary of La Paz.

== Miss Bolivia ==
Amongst her queen agenda, Claudia has officially visited several municipalities in Beni and traveled to Lima, Peru for a photo shoot of the Yanbal year end catalog. She also appeared as the company image of Fancesa in Fexpocruz 2009 and was a Samsung's Teleinformática fair's model, among many other ones. Claudia Arce has been the only Miss Bolivia to date with the longest reign in history, due to a decision of the event's organization, which held the annual event in August instead of May.

From November 2011 through December 2011, Claudia Arce Lemaitre toured through India with the “Healthy Kids, Happy Kids” children's charity organization. Founded by Satish Sikha, they provided food, clothing and medical treatment to thousands of children in need.

=== Post pageant ===
Since 2013, she has been an entertaining and news host in Bolivia's ATB television network, and also performed as actress in a few local theatrical shows.

== Music video ==
Claudia sang and acted in a music video "The Full Moon (Luna Llena)" directed and produced by Gotham Skyline Productions.
