= Mr. Canada =

Mr. Canada may refer to:

- Mr. Canada (broadcaster), nickname for Peter Gzowski (1934–2002), Canadian broadcaster, writer and reporter
- Mr. World Canada, a Canadian male beauty pageant

== See also ==
- Miss Canada
