= Tijana Arnautović =

Bosnian-Canadian beauty pageant titleholder and model

Tijana Petković
- Born: Tijana Arnautović; August 15, 1986 (age 40); Konjic, SR Bosnia and Herzegovina, SFR Yugoslavia
- Height: 1.80 m (5 ft 11 in)
- Beauty pageant titleholder
- Title: Miss World Canada 2004
- Hair color: Brown
- Eye color: Gray
- Major competitions: Miss World Canada 2004 (winner); Miss World 2004

Tijana Petković (Serbian Cyrillic: Тијана Петковић; born August 15, 1986), née Tijana Arnautović, is Bosnian Canadian beauty pageant titleholder and model who won the title of Miss Canada in 2004 and represented her country in Miss World 2004.

== Early life ==
Arnautović was born in Konjic, SR Bosnia and Herzegovina, SFR Yugoslavia, where the family lived until the Bosnian War. Her family fled and stayed in Belgrade, Serbia before arriving in Canada in 1994 when Arnautović was seven years old.

== Miss Canada ==
In 2004, then a Carleton University student, Arnautović was named Miss World Canada.

== Professional engagement ==
Tijana worked as Business Development Manager for Ominiglobe Business Solutions and most recently she was welcomed to a new role with German international company TITUS where she is employed as German Account Executive.

== Community work ==
Once moved to Canada Tiјana was active in the local Serbian community as a volunteer. After she was crowned as Miss Canada in 2004 Tiјana dedicated her time to promote youth leadership and community engagement. Tiјana founded and led The International Diaspora Youth Leadership Conference from 2009 to 2011.

Preceded by Nazanin Afshin-Jam	Miss World Canada; 2004	Succeeded by Ramona Amiri
