= Jovana Marjanović =

- Born: Jovana Marjanović
- Beauty pageant titleholder
- Title: Miss Earth Fire 2005
- Hair color: Brown
- Eye color: Brown
- Major competitions: Miss Earth 2005 (Miss Earth – Fire)

Jovana Marjanović (Serbian Cyrillic: Јована Марјановић) (born c. 1987 in Novi Sad, Yugoslavia) represented her country (which was then Serbia and Montenegro) in the Miss Earth 2005 pageant, held in Quezon City, Philippines on 23 October 2005, where she was crowned Miss Earth-Fire (3rd runner-up).
