= Katherine McClure =

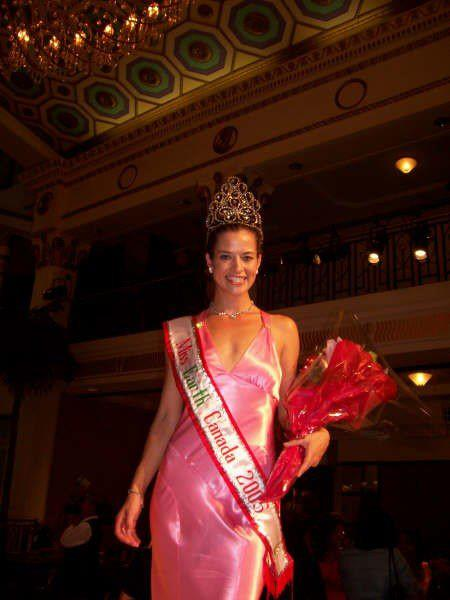
- Miss Earth Canada 2005
- Born: Katherine McClure; April 16, 1981 (age 44); Canada
- Beauty pageant titleholder
- Title: Miss Earth Canada 2005
- Hair colour: Brown
- Eye colour: Brown

Katherine McClure (born April 16, 1981) is a Canadian actress and beauty pageant titleholder. She won Miss Earth Canada 2005 and represented her country in the 2005 Miss Earth pageant.

== Pageantry ==
McClure has participated in several Canadian pageantry competitions, including Miss Toronto International (2003), Miss Canada International (2004), and Miss Toronto Galaxy (2004). She won Miss Congeniality in the Miss Earth 2005 pageant that took place on October 23, 2005, in Quezon City, Philippines.

== Advocacy ==
McClure is an advocate for Amnesty International, Plan Canada, Earthroots Canada, The Equator Initiative, and the Kalinga Mission for Indigenous Children and Youth Development.

== Acting career ==
McClure has performed in a number of Canadian theater productions.

Acting roles
Role	Production	Theater	Date
Liesl von Trapp	The Sound of Music	Vaughan City Playhouse and Newmarket Theatre	2004
Maria	West Side Story	Leah Posluns Theatre	2005
Carmen Diaz	Fame	Stephen Leacock Theatre	2007
Natalie Channeuse	Jenny’s House of Joy	Newmarket Stage Company	2008
Lola Lamar	Copacabana	Stephen Leacock Theatre	2009
Eugenia Bale	The Glorious 12th	Aurora Theatre	2012
Maria Rainer	The Sound of Music	The Richmond Hill Centre for the Performing Arts and Newmarket Theatre	2013
