= Tara Teng =

Canadian former pageant winner (born 1988)

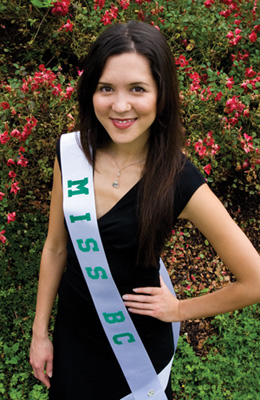
- Teng in 2013
- Born: August 16, 1988 (age 38); Fort Langley, British Columbia, Canada
- Education: Trinity Western University
- Occupation: Former pageant winner
- Beauty pageant titleholder
- Title: Miss BC World; Miss Canada; Miss World Canada
- Years active: 2010–2012
- Major competition: Miss World 2012

Chinese name
- Traditional Chinese: 鄧愛群
- Simplified Chinese: 邓爱群
Transcriptions
Standard Mandarin
- Hanyu Pinyin: Dèng' Àiqún
- Wade–Giles: Teng Oi Kwan
Yue: Cantonese
- Jyutping: Dang^{6} Ngoi^{3} Kwan^{4}
- Website: tarateng.com

Tara Oi-kwan Teng (Chinese: 鄧愛群; Wade–Giles: Teng Oi Kwan; born August 17, 1988), is a Canadian former pageant winner. She was crowned Miss Canada 2011 and also Miss World Canada 2012. During her title reigns she was an advocate for human rights and spoke about human trafficking.

== Early life and education ==
Teng is the daughter of a Chinese Singaporean church pastor father and a white Canadian mother, and she was raised as a Christian. She was homeschooled until the age of 15. She received a Bachelor of Education from Trinity Western University (TWU).

Teng spent four months studying at TWU's Laurentian Leadership Centre (LLC) in Ottawa, participating in the Laurentian Leadership Program. While in Ottawa, she had a year-long internship with Joy Smith, Member of Parliament (MP) for Kildonan—St. Paul in Winnipeg, who had been working to implement laws to reduce the demand for prostitution in Canada and on improving awareness about human trafficking.

== Pageants ==
In 2010 Teng won the Miss BC World contest and the pageant's online People's Choice Award. In 2011, she was crowned Miss Canada. She won the Miss World Canada pageant in 2012, and represented Canada at the 2012 Miss World pageant, although she did not place as a finalist in the Beauty with a Purpose segment of the competition or as a top 30 quarter-finalist.

== Activism ==
=== In Canada ===
Teng was inspired to begin working against human trafficking when, at age 16, she moved to suburban Vancouver and met a neighbour whose daughter had been lost to human trafficking when she was 14 and prostituted by the girl's then-boyfriend.

In October 2010, Teng met with Canada's Prime Minister, Stephen Harper, to discuss human trafficking. In November 2011, Joy Smith and Bruce Stanton, Assistant Deputy Speaker of the House of Commons, hosted a reception in Teng's honour, at which she gave a speech to Senators and MPs about human trafficking.

Teng participated in "Buying Sex is Not a Sport", a campaign during the 2010 Winter Olympics. After participating in Toronto's second annual Freedom Walk in March 2011, she organized the Freedom Week campaign in the Lower Mainland, British Columbia with Todd Hauptman. That August, she participated in the Ignite the Road to Justice Mission Tour, beginning in Vancouver. The tour continued across the country eastwards.

Teng participated in an anti-human trafficking task force in her hometown of Langley, British Columbia, producing a report on measures the community could do to tackle it. In April 2012, Teng and Hauptman presented Langley Township with an "action plan" and asked the township to accept the plan's first two stages, dealing with prevention and education.

Teng partnered with World Vision International to give speeches at events raising funds for International Justice Mission, which rescues children from brothels.

=== In Asia ===
In June 2011, Teng visited towns and slums in Cambodia and Thailand where families had sold their daughters to sexual slavery. These included Patpong, Thailand where she partnered with Rahab Ministries Thailand to spend time with female human trafficking survivors. In Chiang Mai, Thailand, Teng spoke to an audience of 40,000 people at the MTV Freedom Concert in support of MTV EXIT, a campaign to end human trafficking and exploitation. The Cambodia trip was supported by the advocacy group Traffic Jam and World Orphans.

In February 2012, Teng was a keynote speaker at the Freedom and Honor Conference in Seoul. Later in the year, she travelled to Sri Lanka. There, she visited World Vision's development programs in Thanamalvila Divisional Secretariat and Bogawantalawa to help fundraising efforts.

== Post-pageant life ==
Teng currently works as a life and style blogger and is the B.C. director of the Joy Smith Foundation, an organization which serves to combat human trafficking and help survivors. She also works as a life coach in Vancouver working within the faith deconstruction movement. Her book, Your Body is a Revolution: Healing Our Relationships with Our Bodies, Each Other and the Earth was published in 2023.

== Honours ==
In 2011, Chatelaine named her one of Canada's "Hot 20 Under 30" women. In 2012 she was one of 30 Langley residents to receive the Queen Elizabeth II Diamond Jubilee Medal. That same year the Joy Smith Foundation recognised her work in human rights by giving her its International Freedom Award, and she was added to the Catalyst Conference's Young Influencers List.

== Personal life ==
Teng married husband Chris Yamauchi in May 2013. They had two children together. In November 2019, she announced that her marriage had ended and she had been living as a single mother for a full year.

Since her divorce, Teng has come out as bisexual. She left mainstream Christianity due to the scrutiny she faced as an Asian bisexual woman.

In November 2021, she announced that she and her fiancé Anthony Lively are expecting a child in 2022.

Preceded by Sandra Gin	Miss BC World; 2010	Succeeded by Cheryl Dietrich
Preceded by Mélanie Paquin	Miss Canada; 2011	Succeeded by Jaclyn Miles
Preceded by Riza Santos	Miss World Canada; 2012	Succeeded by Camille Munro
