= Daisi Pollard =

- Born: Juél-Maddie Daisi Pollard Sepulveda; 21 May 1980 (age 46); Newark, New Jersey, U.S.
- Occupations: Model, actress, business woman, author
- Years active: 1992–present
- Modeling information
- Height: 5 ft 8 in (1.73 m)
- Hair color: Blonde reference
- Eye color: Brown
- Agency: Models Only LA (Los Angeles)

Juél-Maddie Daisi Pollard Sepulveda (born May 21, 1980) is an American-Jamaican actress, model, businesswoman, author and beauty pageant titleholder. In 2005 she was crowned Miss Jamaica International, which led her to compete at a higher level. She was the first Jamaican candidate to compete in the Miss Earth 2005, Miss Asia Pacific 2005, and Miss Beauty Queen World 2005, and is the only known candidate to hold three different national titles throughout a single pageant career.

In addition to her pageant and modeling career, she has embarked on other endeavors, which include business ventures, public speaking engagements, books, and appearances in films and television. Pollard Sepulveda is involved in charity work for various causes, most notably her association with meningitis.

== Early life ==
Pollard Sepulveda was born in Newark, New Jersey, and raised in New York City. She is of Jamaican and Middle-Eastern descent. Pollard Sepulveda was born with a minor birth deformity in her left eye, called an upper eyelid coloboma, which hindered her early years both socially and professionally as a result of childhood bullying and low self-esteem. She had reconstructive surgery at the age of 22.

After her father died, Pollard Sepulveda and her mother moved from New York City to Virginia where her mother remarried. Shortly thereafter, she entered into the foster care system after her mother and step-father were charged with child neglect. At the age of 12, Pollard Sepulveda was adopted by her paternal grandmother and moved to Connecticut. Her grandmother thought she had potential as a model, actor and dancer and enrolled her in the Barbizon School of Modeling in Stamford, Connecticut; she studied theater and ballet concurrently.

== Modeling ==
Pollard Sepulveda began modeling at age 12. Her early work involved regular appearances as a showroom model, department store fashion shows, catalogs and runway modeling at the New York Fashion Cafe. Her body of work includes Los Angeles Fashion Week, New York Fashion Week, LA Urban Fashion Week, Jam Vibez magazine, Reggae Planet, Gap, Old Navy, MTV, Lifetime's: How to Look Good Naked (episode 2.2), Bravo's Launch My Line. "Bare Minimal" (episode 4) and Good Day LA. She has also appeared on international networks TVJ, and CVM's Smile Jamaica and Star World ABS-CBN in Asia.

She had small parts in the films King of the Streets by Laguna Productions and Box of Shadows (2010). In 2014, Sepulveda walked for Laurie Elyse in the 2014 New York Couture Fashion Week. In 2015, she made a cameo appearance in the German movie ABC's of Superheroes. She is the spokesmodel for the clothing company VencciLA.

== Pageants ==
Pollard Sepulveda has held the following titles: Miss Jamaica International 2005, Miss Asia Pacific International Jamaica 2005, Miss Earth Jamaica 2005, Miss Beauty Queen World Jamaica 2005, Miss Beauty Queen World 2005, Miss Asia USA Israel 2005, Miss Asia USA 2006, Mrs. Jamaica 2011 and Mrs. Ethnic World International 2012.

During the Miss Asia Pacific International 2005 competition in Guangzhou, China, Pollard Sepulveda was most notable for her on-stage protest over the poor treatment of contestants by the organizers. Prior to the pageant's final dress rehearsal, candidates had been told that the rehearsal would just be a "run through" and so many of them declined to wear makeup. However, the candidates were not informed that judges would be present, and that the rehearsal was being taped for television. Many of the delegates felt extremely uncomfortable about the situation and were crying backstage. Being one of the more media-friendly delegates, Pollard Sepulveda decided to speak up about the situation. When it was her turn to hit the stage, she interrupted the taping by walking across the stage to the microphone and emphatically protesting. Pollard Sepulveda was escorted off stage and judges were eventually removed from the rehearsal.

In 2011, she represented Jamaican married women in the Mrs. Ethnic World International competition, which took place in Los Angeles, California. During the competition, Pollard Sepulveda performed the Japanese martial art Shurikenjutsu. Some of her sponsors included Laurie Elyse, The Grammy Museum, 1010 Wilshire, and several Martial Arts companies. Through this pageant, she was also able to co-produce and star in a documentary called Living Jamerican, which allowed the viewer an inside look into a day in the life of a Jamaican-American beauty queen. Pollard Sepúlveda was crowned Mrs. Ethnic World International 2012.

== Charity work ==
She has volunteered with organizations such as the LA Prom Closet, a nonprofit that gives underprivileged girls the chance to fully enjoy their prom, complete with dress and shoes. She has supported AIDS awareness organizations including the Red Pump Project to support National Women & Girl's HIV/AIDS Awareness Day, and the TransgiaDivas event organized by the Minority AIDS Project.

During her Miss Jamaica International 2005 reign, Pollard Sepulveda promoted computer and technology literacy for the CCGI Foundation in Jamaica, gaining support from Governor General, Sir Howard Cooke, Mayor of Kingston, Desmond McKenzie, Minister of Education, Maxine Henry-Wilson and the Jamaica Tourist Board. From 2006 to 2008, she toured as a keynote speaker for Barbizon International to promote their $100,000 scholarship program.

During her reign as Mrs. Ethnic World International 2012, Pollard Sepulveda focused on a series of small charitable efforts titled Legacy Projects, where she noted the significance of showing others how to leave part of yourself behind in small ways. Through the nonprofit Dress for Success, she was able to donate several outfits to help women feel prepared to take on new employment opportunities. Pollard Sepulveda has also partnered with the National Ladies Professional Group, the Asian Professional Exchange, AIDS Project Los Angeles (APLA), and the Red Cross.

In 2012, Pollard Sepulveda was elected chairwoman of The Meningitis Foundation of America, Inc., having previously been an honorary committee member for the National Meningitis Association. As a survivor of viral meningitis, she felt a need to spread awareness of the disease. She resigned from the position in early 2014.

== Business ==
In 2005 Pollard Sepulveda used her pageant and sponsorship platform to leverage her way into various business opportunities including a modeling agency, real estate, and several micro startups.

In 2014, she founded Daisi Media Corp, a digital media company which houses a multi-channel network, a blog network, and manages the digital properties, images, and video for Pollard Sepulveda. The company's most notable digital property is Daisi Jo Reviews, which gives reviews on products in the worlds of fashion, beauty, and other product categories. The site has partnered with brands such as RocksBox, MagnetStreet.com, Andre Lorent, Avon, Healthy Delights, and Thin Tea. Daisi Media Corp. also owns 50% of Venccila.com, for which Pollard Sepulveda is the sole spokesmodel, and several other e-commerce brands.

== Authorship ==
Pollard Sepulveda self-published all three of her books through her media company, Daisi Media Corp. She wrote To Be A Queen, a look into what it takes to be a beauty queen, and Starter Model, a guide for new models trying to break into the industry. She also republished her great-grandfather's book, The Tin Box, originally written by Jerome Aredell Williams which tells the story of an heiress, cowboy, and an oil and cattle con artist during the gold rush era. Pollard Sepulveda wrote the prologue, introduction, and preface.
