= Linda Douma =

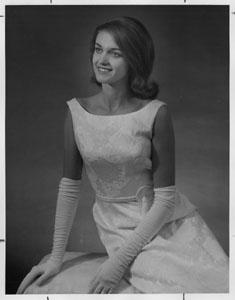
- Linda Douma
- Born: 1944 (age 80–81); Tofino, Canada

Linda Douma (born 1944) is a former Miss Canada.

Douma was born in Tofino and raised in Sidney, British Columbia, where her family moved when she was two years old. She studied Spanish and French at the University of Victoria. She won the Miss Sidney and Miss PNE (Pacific National Exhibition) Pageants in 1963 as well.

Her selection in 1964 as Miss Canada was based on a talent competition, where she sang a folk song, and on her appearance in a bathing suit and in an evening dress. Her prizes were a $1000 scholarship and $5000 in various tokens, which included a watch, a necklace, a console radio-phonograph, a wardrobe, and a three-week trip to Hawaii. She was also secured a job with an annual salary exceeding $5000, and was selected to represent Canada at various public events around the world. According to numerous press releases of that time, her victory "put Sidney on the map".

Douma was the first Miss Canada winner to travel abroad, which included trips to India, Hong Kong, Japan, Hawaii and Cyprus. Those trips indirectly promoted the Miss Canada competition worldwide, both as a prestigious event and a business investment opportunity. They were also used as part of military diplomacy, supporting the Canadian troops that helped to regulate the Cypriot crisis and the arrival of two Canadian naval destroyers to Hawaii. Her trip to Japan was part of a major commercial campaign aiming to promote Canada-Japan trade ties. Apart from numerous business and modelling offers, those trips also attracted Douma to Buddhism, so much that by 1967 she moved to Nepal to study its culture and live ascetic life.
