= Alesia Fieldberg =

Canadian journalist

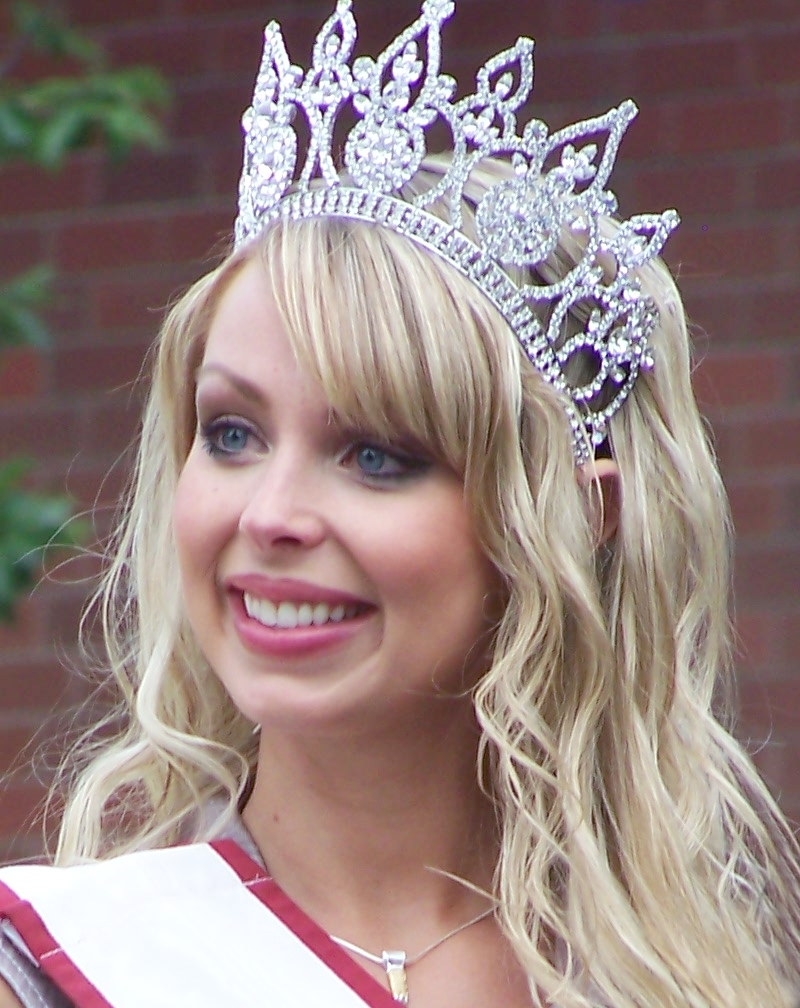
- Miss Canada International 2008 Alesia Fieldberg
- Occupation: TV reporter
- Known for: Miss Canada International 2008

Alesia Fieldberg is a Canadian journalist currently working with CTV Calgary as a reporter and anchor. She came to Calgary after working for CTV Winnipeg. Prior to Winnipeg, she worked at CTV Lethbridge. Before CTV she hosted an Alberta Travel show for Shaw TV.

== Early life ==
Fieldberg holds an International Relations Degree from the University of Calgary and graduated from the Broadcast News program at the Southern Alberta Institute of Technology. Fieldberg was selected Miss Canada International 2008 on August 18, 2007. She was previously selected "Miss Calgary, AB" on March 17, 2007.
