= Cynthia Loewen =

Canadian beauty pageant titleholder (born 1993)

- Born: Cynthia Loewen; November 13, 1993 (age 32); LaSalle, Ontario, Canada
- Height: 1.73 m (5 ft 8 in)
- Spouse: Jonathan Seguin (m. 2016)
- Children: 2
- Beauty pageant titleholder
- Title: Miss Teen Face of Beauty International Canada 2012, Miss Earth Canada 2014
- Hair colour: Blonde
- Eye colour: Blue
- Major competitions: Miss Teen Face of Beauty International 2012 (2nd Runner up); Miss Earth Canada 2012 (1st Runner up); Miss Earth Canada 2014 (winner); Miss Earth 2014 (finalist)

Cynthia Dussault Loewen (born November 13, 1993) is a Canadian blogger, model and beauty pageant titleholder who was crowned Miss Earth Canada 2014 in Montreal, Canada on August 23, 2014. She represented Canada in the Miss Earth 2014 pageant.

== Early life ==
Loewen is of German, Dutch and French descent. She is the daughter of a retired special-needs educator, and a prosthetist. Her younger brother, Garrick Loewen, is a professional triathlete.

In spring 2016, Cynthia received her Bachelors of Arts and Science with distinction from the University of Windsor, specializing in Biological Sciences and French. She played competitive hockey for many years. She had been considering a career in medicine before choosing to become a full-time homemaker.

== Pageantry ==
Cynthia represented Canada in the Miss Teen Face of Beauty International pageant in 2012 in Chiang Mai, Thailand. She placed second runner-up and currently holds the record for highest Canadian placement in this competition.

Cynthia joined the Miss Earth Canada pageant for the first time in 2012, where she placed first runner-up. The crown was won by Valérie Rémillard.

Cynthia joined the Miss Earth Canada pageant once again in 2014, where she then won the title. Under the training of Miss Earth Canada 2001, Michelle Weswaldi, she represented Canada as a finalist in the Miss Earth 2014 competition.

== Content creation ==
In 2019, she created a YouTube channel which focuses on similar themes.

== Personal life ==
On August 26, 2016, Loewen married former Canadian MMA fighter Jonathan Sequin in a Catholic ceremony. Loewen experienced a miscarriage in 2020. The couple have one son born in 2021 and a daughter born in 2022.

Loewen is friends with fellow Canadian beauty queen Lauren Howe. She is a practicing Roman Catholic and speaks French.

Awards and achievements
Preceded by Sofiya Chorniy	Miss Earth Canada; 2014	Succeeded by Tatiana Maranhao
