= Miss Earth 2005 =

5th Miss Earth pageant

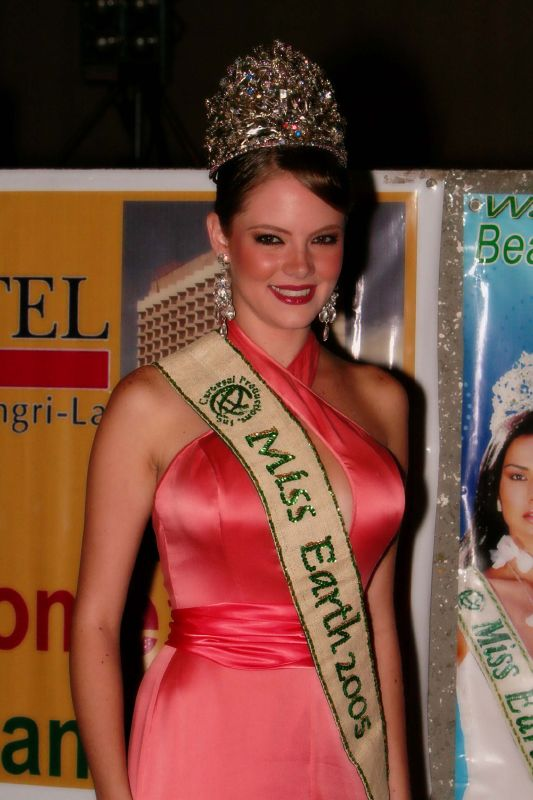
- Alexandra Braun
- Date: October 23, 2005
- Presenters: Ariel Ureta; Amanda Griffin
- Venue: UP Theater, Quezon City, Philippines
- Broadcaster: ABS-CBN; The Filipino Channel; Star World
- Entrants: 80
- Placements: 16
- Debuts: Bahamas; Cambodia; Cameroon; Haiti; Hong Kong; Indonesia; Jamaica; Macau; Mauritius; Mongolia; Niue; Pakistan; Romania; Saint Lucia; Samoa; Slovak Republic; Tokelau; Turks and Caicos Islands; Zambia
- Withdrawals: Albania; Bulgaria; Chad; Costa Rica; Ethiopia; Guatemala; Switzerland; Trinidad and Tobago; Uruguay
- Returns: Afghanistan; Czech Republic; Germany; Japan; Latvia; Panama; Russia; Ukraine; Venezuela
- Winner: Alexandra Braun; Venezuela

Miss Earth 2005 was the fifth edition of the Miss Earth pageant, held at the University of the Philippines Theater in Quezon City, Metro Manila, Philippines, on October 23, 2005.

Priscilla Meirelles of Brazil crowned Alexandra Braun of Venezuela as her successor at the end of the event. Like Brazil, Venezuela made history by becoming the second country to win all the Big Four international beauty pageants.

== Results ==
=== Placements ===
Placement	Contestant
Miss Earth 2005	Venezuela – Alexandra Braun
Miss Earth – Air 2005	Dominican Republic – Amell Santana
Miss Earth – Water 2005	Poland – Katarzyna Borowicz
Miss Earth – Fire 2005	Serbia and Montenegro – Jovana Marjanovic
Top 8	Chile – Nataly Chilet; Paraguay – Tania Domaniczky; Puerto Rico – Vanessa De Roide; United States – Amanda Kimmel
Top 16	Bosnia and Herzegovina – Sanja Susnja; Czech Republic – Zuzana Štěpanovská; Ecuador – Cristina Eugenia Reyes; El Salvador – Irma Dimas; South Korea – Hye-mi Yoo; Philippines – Genebelle Raagas; Russia – Tatyana Yamova; Tanzania – Rehema Sudi

=== Special awards ===
==== Major awards ====
Awards	Contestant
Miss Friendship	Canada – Katherine McClure
Miss Photogenic	Chile – Nataly Chilet
Miss Talent	Ukraine – Yevgeniya Rudenko
Best in National Costume	South Korea – Hye-mi Yoo
Best in Evening Gown	Puerto Rico – Vanessa De Roide
Best in Swimsuit	Venezuela – Alexandra Braun

==== Minor/Sponsor awards ====
Awards	Contestant
Miss Cyber Press Earth	Poland – Katarzyna Borowicz
Miss Pond's	South Korea – Hye-mi Yoo
Miss Pond's	Venezuela – Alexandra Braun
Miss Pond's	Dominican Republic – Amell Santana
Miss Pond's	Puerto Rico – Vanessa De Roide
Miss Pond's	Poland – Katarzyna Borowicz

== Contestants ==
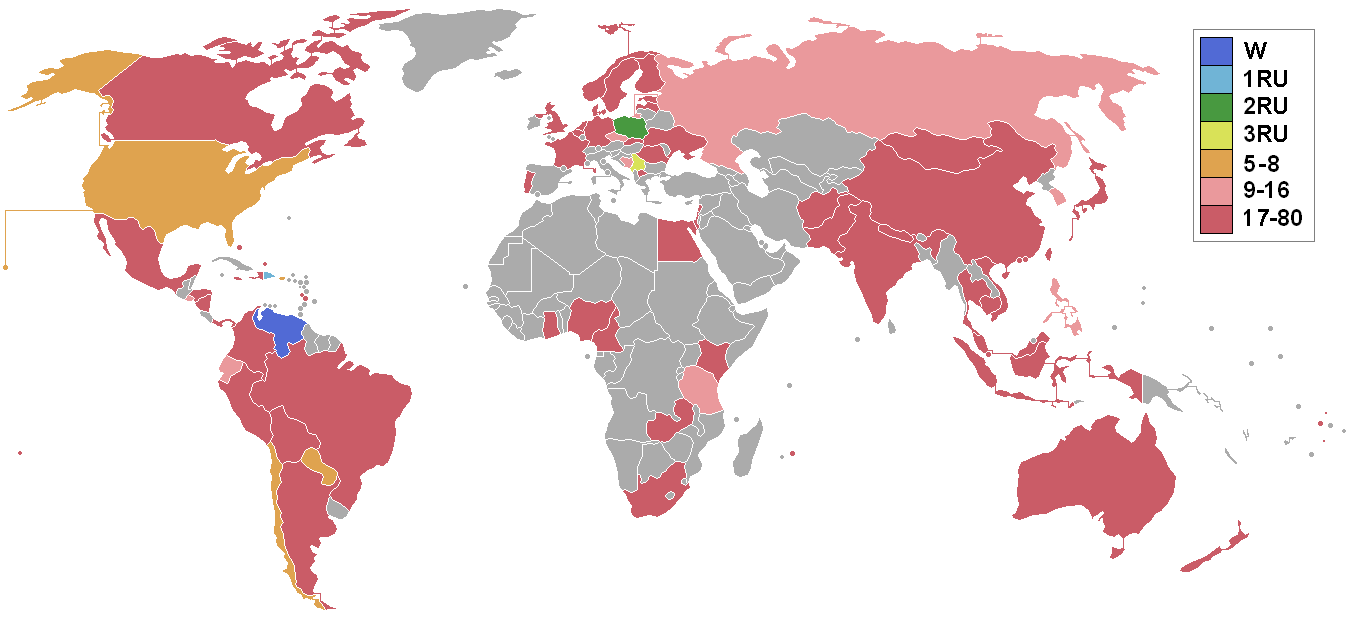
Countries and territories which sent delegates and results

80 contestants participated in Miss Earth 2005:

- Afghanistan – Sitara Bahrami
- Argentina – Eliana Ocolotobiche
- Australia – Anne-Maree Bowdler
- Bahamas – Nadia Cash
- Belgium – Isabel van Rompaey
- Bolivia – Vanessa Patricia Morón Jarzun
- Bosnia and Herzegovina – Sanja Susnja
- Brazil – Isabella Chaves
- Cambodia – Mealea Pich
- Cameroon – Wonja Ngeah Ginette Martine
- Canada – Katherine McClure
- Chile – Nataly Chilet
- China – Noelle Li Yi-Jia
- Colombia – Lia Patricia Correal Lopera
- Czech Republic – Zuzana Štěpanovská
- Denmark – Heidi Zadeh
- Dominican Republic – Amell Santana
- Ecuador – Cristina Eugenia Reyes Hidalgo
- Egypt – Elham Wagdi
- El Salvador – Irma Marina Dimas Pineda
- Estonia – Anastassija Balak
- Finland – Rita Aaltolahti
- France – Alexandra Uhan
- Germany – Rebecca Kunikowski
- Ghana – Faustina Adjao Akoto
- Haiti – Channa Cius
- Honduras – Ruth María Arita
- Hong Kong – Aisha Gu Reu
- India – Niharika Singh
- Indonesia – Jenny Graciella Jevinzky Sutjiono
- Israel – Avivit Meirson
- Jamaica – Daisi Pollard
- Japan – Emi Suzuki
- Kenya – Stella Malis
- Latvia – Nora Reinholde
- Lebanon – Chantal Karam
- Macau – Rebecca Qian Qiong
- Macedonia – Jana Stojanovska
- Malaysia – Jamie Pang Hui Ting
- Martinique – Elle Narayanan
- Mauritius – Loshanee Moodaley
- Mexico – Lorena Jaime Hochstrasser
- Mongolia – Sarnai Amar
- Nepal – Shavona Shrestha
- Netherlands – Dagmar Saija
- New Zealand – Tiffany Pickford
- Nicaragua – Sandra Maritza Ríos Hernández
- Nigeria – Ethel Okosuns
- Niue – Ngiar Pearson
- Norway – Vibeke Hansen
- Pakistan – Naomi Zaman
- Panama – Rosemary Isabel Suárez Machazek
- Paraguay – Tania María Domaniczky Vargas
- Peru – Sara María Paredes Valdivia
- Philippines – Genebelle Francisco Raagas
- Poland – Katarzyna Weronika Borowicz
- Portugal – Ângela Maria Fonseca Spínola
- Puerto Rico – Vanessa De Roide
- Romania – Adina Dimitru
- Russia – Tatyana Yamova
- Saint Lucia – Hanna Gabrielle Fitz
- Samoa – Josephine Meisake
- Serbia and Montenegro – Jovana Marjanovic
- Singapore – Sim Pei Yee
- Slovak Republic – Diana Ondrejickova
- South Africa – Jacqueline Postma
- South Korea – Hye-mi Yoo
- Sweden – Therese Denitton
- Tahiti – Vaimiti Herlaud
- Taiwan – Carolyn Lin Yi-Fan
- Tanzania – Rehema Sudi
- Thailand – Kanokwan Sesthaphongvanich
- Tokelau – Landy Tyrell
- Turks and Caicos Islands – Trina Adams
- Ukraine – Yevgeniya Rudenko
- United Kingdom – Emma Corten
- United States – Amanda Kimmel
- Venezuela – Alexandra Braun
- Vietnam – Đào Thanh Hoài
- Zambia – Cynthia Kanema
