= Leanne Baird =

Canadian beauty pageant titleholder

Leanne Baird (now Marrazzo)
- Born: Leanne Baird; Stoney Creek (now Hamilton), Ontario
- Height: 1.70 m (5 ft 7 in)
- Beauty pageant titleholder
- Title: Miss Canada International 1998
- Hair colour: Brown
- Eye colour: Blue
- Major competitions: Miss Canada International 1998 (winner); Miss World 1998

Leanne Baird is a Canadian teacher and beauty pageant titleholder. She was Miss Canada International 1998. She was chosen Miss Canada International in August 1998 and went to the Seychelles for the Miss World pageant on 26 November 1998. She did not win Miss World 1998, but her roommate, Miss Israel 1998 Linor Abargil, did.

== Early life ==
Leanne Baird was born in Stoney Creek, Ontario. She also won Miss Winona Peach Queen in her late teens. After her reign, she and her sister ran the Miss Winona Peach Queen Pageant in Winona Ontario for several years.

== Career ==
After her reign was completed, she finished Teachers College in Canada. She has been an English teacher and now a Guidance Counsellor at Cathedral High School in Hamilton Ontario. She currently works as Head Guidance Counsellor in a High School in Hamilton. She has been a special needs worker and a camp supervisor working with children. She has also volunteered for many camps, youth organizations, and hospitals. She married in 2007 and has three daughters.
