= Miss Universe Canada 2026 =

- Date: 8 August 2026
- Venue: Le Casino, Montreal, Quebec
- Broadcaster: Livestream
- Entrants: 35
- Placements: 12
- Winner: Aslihan Morali

Miss Universe Canada 2026 was the 23rd Miss Universe Canada pageant held on 8 August 2026.

== Final results ==
Final results	Contestant
Miss Universe Canada 2026	Ontario – Aslihan Morali
1st Runner-Up (Miss Cosmo Canada 2026)	Ontario – Jabili Kandula
2nd Runner-Up	Ontario – Emilie Vos
3rd Runner-Up	British Columbia – Patricia Rosalyn Seward
4th Runner-Up	Ontario – Naomi Colford

== Official delegates ==
Meet the 35 national delegates competing for the title of Miss Universe Canada 2026:

Represents	Contestant	Age	Hometown
Alberta	Lana Antonio		Edmonton
Alberta	Jady Peng		Calgary
Alberta	Susan Belter		Coalhurst
British Columbia	Jasvinne Gill		Vancouver Island
British Columbia	Elmira Bijarchian		North Vancouver
British Columbia	Leilany Chan		Vancouver
British Columbia	Vanessa Chauhan		Vancouver
British Columbia	Lynette Lee		Burnaby
British Columbia	Patricia Rosalyn Seward		Burnaby
Ontario	Alexandra Zanela		Toronto
Ontario	Aslihan Morali	28	Ancaster
Ontario	Bahar Zendagi		Scarborough
Ontario	Brianna Christopher		Aurora
Ontario	Brinda Joseph Benher		LaSalle
Ontario	Daphne Moyo		Sherwood Park
Ontario	Emilie Vos		Toronto
Ontario	Jabili Kandula	26	London
Ontario	Jasleen Kaily		Kitchener
Ontario	Kara Westlake		Tecumseh
Ontario	Karisa Haverkamp		Wilsonville
Ontario	Kathy Spence		Toronto
Ontario	Kiley Langille		Toronto
Ontario	Kimberley Grey Ortiz		Hamilton
Ontario	Kudza Kadzviti		Toronto
Ontario	Lady Aundrea Belnavis		Whitby
Ontario	Lynda Christie		Burlington
Ontario	Maia Viera		Windsor
Ontario	Swikriti Khadka		Brampton
Ontario	Melissa Mohamed		North York
Ontario	Naomi Colford		Toronto
Ontario	Ryanne Westlake		Tecumseh
Ontario	Shakira Ibrahim		Windsor
Quebec	Sophia Sladic		Windsor
Quebec	Mikalie Bilodeau Blanco		Quebec City
Quebec	Kainat Azamee		Montreal

== Controversy ==
Miss Universe 2024 Ashley Callingbull criticized the organization when two contestants, Karisa Haverkamp and Jasleen Kaily, wore Indigenous costumes referred to as cultural appropriation during National Costume round, National Director Sonny Borrelli made an apology.
