= Satish Sikha =

Indian fashion designer

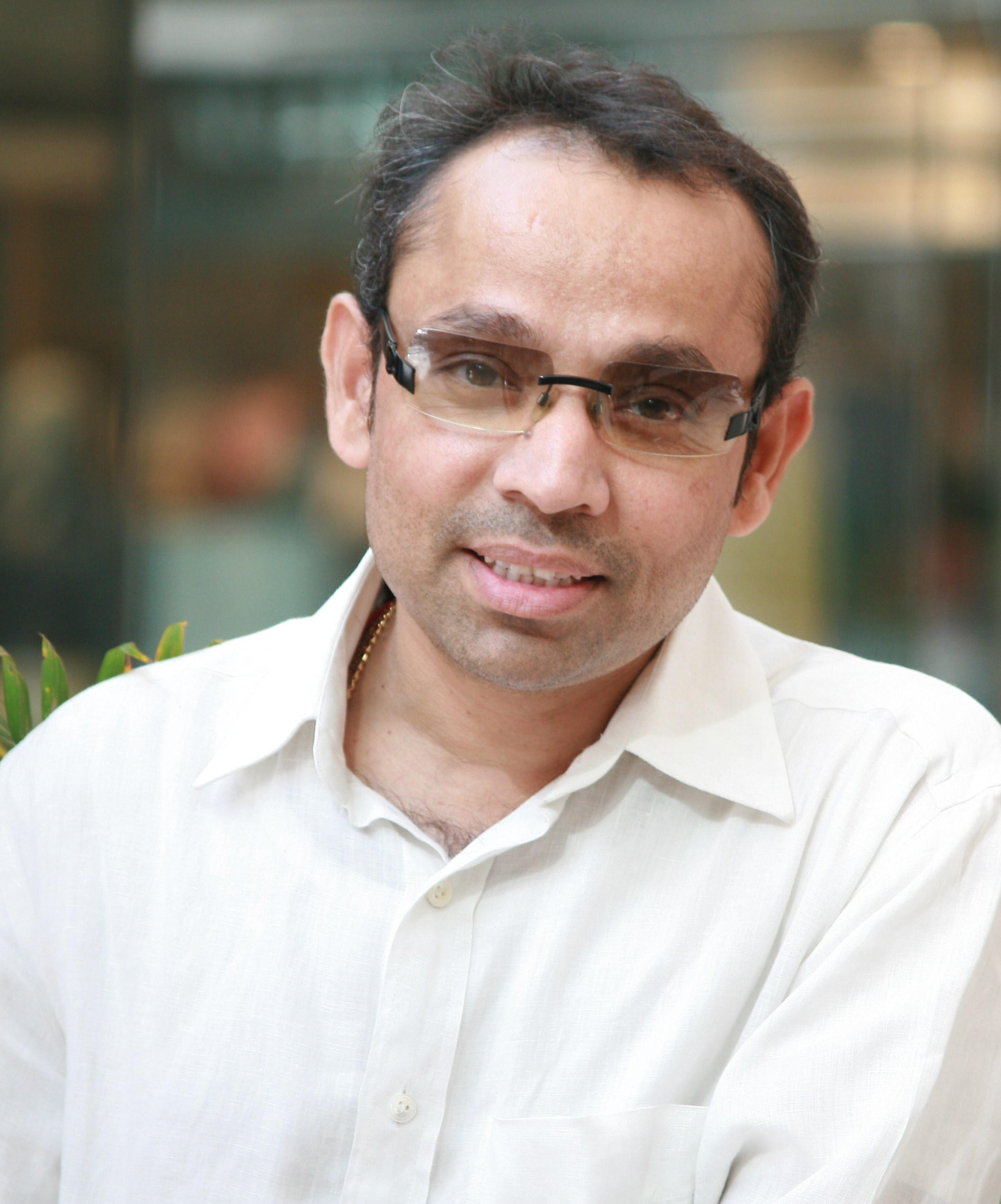
- Born: August 12, 1971 (age 55)
- Occupation: Social Work
- Website: www.sikha.com

Signature
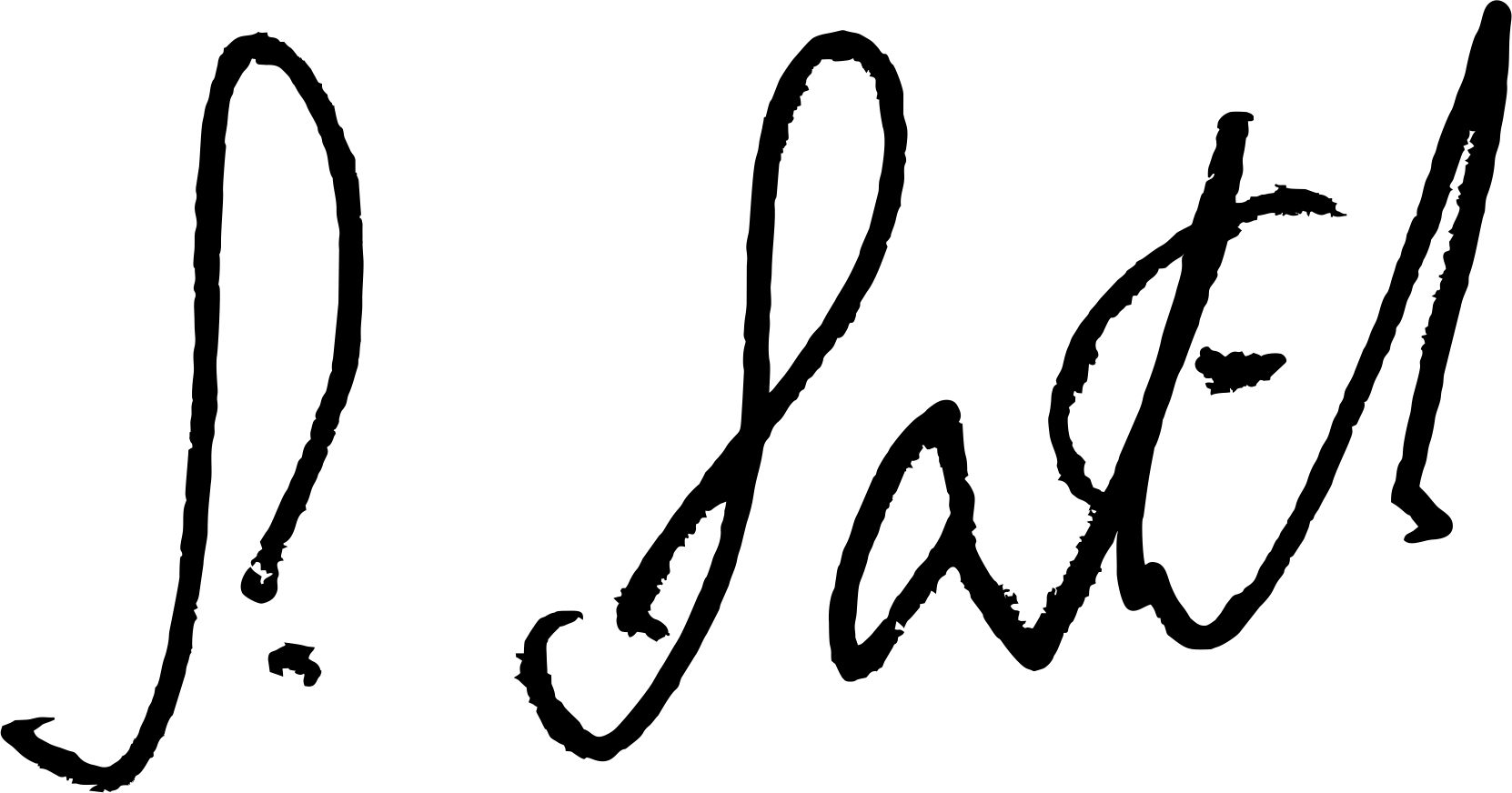

Satish Sikha (born 12 August 1971) is an Indian-born Canadian fashion designer particularly noted for his haute couture designs. In 2007, he had a boutique in Toronto. In the year 2007, he left fashion designing and started a campaign against Global Warming. On 8 April 2014, he was awarded an honorary doctorate by Eco Asia University, Mongolia for his Environmental Services for mankind. His Couture Designs were selected by Canada's high-end department stores Holt Renfrew, often compared to Barneys and Saks Fifth Avenue in the United States. He is the founder of 90MillionSmiles Foundation.

Sikha founded the 90MillionSmiles Foundation, an NGO that aims to support underprivileged children across India.

Sikha constructed a kilometre-long silk cloth starting in 2007, with messages of support for the environment on a silk cloth (one yard for each message) from dignitaries and celebrities. The silk cloth finally became 1.2 kilometres long with messages from approximately 1,263 people.

In June 2011, Satish Sikha received a Certificate of Honour from the Ministry of Nature, Environment and Tourism of Mongolia. The award was given in recognition of his contributions as a “Restless Fighter Against Global Warming” and his efforts in leading public awareness through the “Green Silk Ribbon” campaign, aimed at combating ecological degradation and promoting environmental sustainability. The certificate was signed by Minister Gansukh Luimed.
