= Miss Canada =

National beauty pageant in Canada

- Formation: 1946; 80 years ago
- Type: Beauty pageant
- Headquarters: Montreal
- Location: Canada
- Official language: English, French

Miss Canada is a beauty pageant for young women in Canada. It was founded in Hamilton in 1946. No title was awarded from 1993 through 2008. The trademark was purchased in 2009 by a Québec organization who produces the pageant under the name to this day. According to the new Miss Canada and Miss Teen Canada web site, the title was re-established with a focus on personality over physical appearance. The Miss Canada competition is Canada's oldest extant beauty pageant.

Winnifred Blair of Saint John, New Brunswick was proclaimed the first "Miss Canada" on 11 February 1923 at an earlier, unrelated competition during the Montreal Winter Carnival. The runner-up in that event was Muriel Harper of Winnipeg, Manitoba.

The first broadcast of the Miss Canada pageant aired on November 10, 1963 on CTV with news anchors Peter Jennings and Baden Langton hosting. Gordon MacRae was hired to sing the first Miss Canada Pageant song. Each of the 23 contestants was escorted by a young officer of the Canadian Armed Forces. Carol Ann Balmer of Toronto won, and Lise Mercier of Quebec City was Miss Congeniality. The escorts were selected and supervised by a young Armoured Corps Officer, J. R. Digger MacDougall, who escorted the runner up, Lise Mercier.

Jennings remained as solo host until 1966 and was replaced by game show host Jim Perry, who hosted the pageant until 1990. Dominique Dufour, the winner of the Miss Canada Pageant in 1981, co-hosted with Perry from 1982 until 1990. The final pageant before its initial cancellation aired in late 1991 and was hosted by Peter Feniak and Liz Grogan.

The show was popular in the 1970s, with up to 5 million viewers, but declined in the 1980s, until it was cancelled in 1992. Producers of the show cited mounting production costs, as the reason for cancellation. The last winner was Miss Canada 1992 Nicole Dunsdon from British Columbia.

Between 1947 and 1962, the Miss Canada Pageant sent delegates to the Miss America pageant. No Miss Canada ever won Miss America but some placed.

The Miss Canada Pageant obtained the franchise for the Miss Universe Pageant in 1978, when that year's first runner-up, Andrea Leslie Eng, competed internationally. From 1979 to the final 1992 contest before cancellation, the winners of Miss Canada went on to compete. Miss Canada 1982, Karen Baldwin, is the only Miss Canada to also win Miss Universe. Since 2003, Canada's representative to Miss Universe has been chosen by the Miss Universe Canada pageant.

== Winners ==
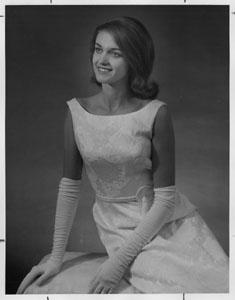
Linda Douma, Miss Canada 1965

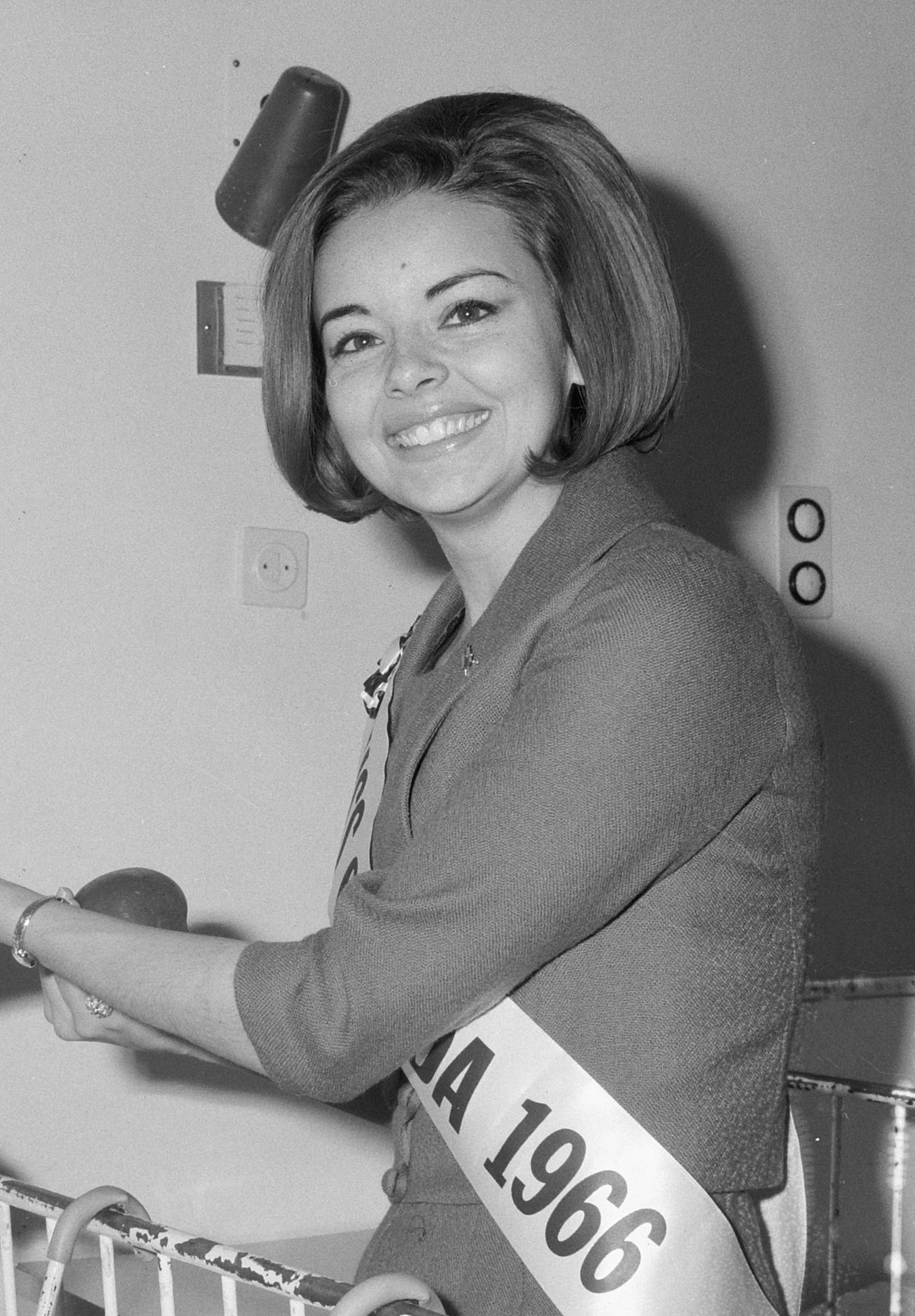
Diane Landry, Miss Canada 1966

The following is a list of winners:

Year	Winner	City, Province	Runner-up (Second Place)
2026	Maura Jahangiri	Holland Landing, Ontario	Marie-Zoé Lapierre
2025	Geneviève McSween	Montreal, Quebec	Karyssa Chininea Alemán
2024	Tanpreet Parmar	Vancouver, British Columbia	Geneviève McSween
2023	Ashley Maria Borzellino	Hamilton, Ontario	Melyka Raby
2022	Marielle David	Île-de-Lamèque, New Brunswick	Melyka Raby
2021	Madison Stewart	Vancouver, British Columbia	Rabiah Dhaliwal
2020	Bremiella De Guzman	Surrey, British Columbia	Jasmin Chahal
2019	Christine Jamieson	Mission, British Columbia	Marie-Hélène Mallet
2018	Maria Giorlando	Windsor, Ontario	Beenu Bajwa
2017	Ciara Thompson	Huntsville, Ontario	
2016	Anabelle Côté	Sherbrooke, Quebec	Karmen Brar
2015	Dominique Doucette	Campbellton, New Brunswick	
2014	Priya Madaan	Windsor, Ontario	
2013	Inès Gavran	Quebec	
2012	Jaclyn Miles	Amherstburg, Ontario	
2011	Tara Teng	Vancouver, British Columbia	
2010	Mélanie Paquin	Gatineau, Quebec	
2009	Lorie Racicot	Montreal, Quebec	
1992	Nicole Dunsdon	Summerland, British Columbia	
1991	Leslie McLaren	Edmonton, Alberta	
1990	Robin Lee Ouzunoff	Niagara Region, Ontario	Tanya Herman
1989	Juliette Powell	Laurentians Region, Quebec	Kari Lee Hudson
1988	Melinda Gillies	London, Ontario	Suzie Pilon
1987	Tina May Simpson	Niagara Region, Ontario	Cindy MacCallum
1986	Rene Newhouse	Cranbrook, British Columbia	Wynne Anita Kroontje
1985	Karen Elizabeth Tilley	Calgary, Alberta	Michelle Irene "Mia" Tambling
1984	Cynthia Kereluk	Edmonton, Alberta	Iris Hope Naumenko
1983	Jodi Yvonne Rutledge	Manitoba	Lilianne Pelchat
1982	Karen Dianne Baldwin	London, Ontario	Renee Louise McLoughlin
1981	Dominique Dufour	Laval, Quebec	Donna Rupert
1980	Terry MacKay	Calgary, Alberta	Marie Laurin
1979	Heidi Quiring	Manitoba	Johanne Turenne
1978	Catherine Swing	Toronto, Ontario	Andrea Leslie Eng
1977	Yvonne Foster	Saskatoon, Saskatchewan	Louise Josée Mondoux
1976	Sylvia McGuire	Nova Scotia	Mary-Lu Zahalan
1975	Terry Lynne Meyer	Edmonton, Alberta	Manni Mary Fink
1974	Blair Lancaster	Burlington, Ontario	Line Renaud
1973	Gillian Regehr	Victoria, British Columbia	Kim Jeffries
1972	Donna Mary Sawicky	Kitchener-Waterloo, Ontario	Patricia Alison Bain
1971	Caroline Amelia Commisso	Thunder Bay, Ontario	Betty Ann Hopner
1970	Julie Maloney	Ottawa/Hull, Ontario/Quebec	
1969	Marie-France Beaulieu	Montreal, Quebec	
1968	Carol McKinnon	Prince Edward Island	Merrilyn Gann
1967	Barbara Kelly	Vancouver, British Columbia	
1966	Diane Landry	Winnipeg, Manitoba	
1965	Linda Douma	Victoria, British Columbia	
1964	Carol Ann Balmer	Toronto, Ontario	
1962–63	Helena "Nina" Holden*	Victoria, British Columbia	
1961	Iris Thurlwell	Toronto, Ontario	
1960	Rosemary Catherine Keenan	Rothesay, New Brunswick	
1959	Danica d'Hondt	Vancouver, British Columbia	
1958	Joan May Fitzpatrick	Windsor, Ontario	
1957	Dorothy Moreau	Montreal, Quebec	
1956	Miss Canada title is post-dated		
1955	Dalyce Smith	Whitehorse, Yukon Territory	
1954	Barbara Joan Markham	Cornwall, Ontario	
1953	Kathleen Archibald	Kelowna, British Columbia	
1952	Marilyn Reddick	Toronto, Ontario	
1951	Marjorie Kelly	Courtland, Ontario	
1950	Margaret Bradford	London, Ontario	
1949	Margaret Lynn Munn	Vancouver, British Columbia	
1948	Betty Jean Ferguson	Halifax, Nova Scotia	
1947	Margaret Marshall	Toronto, Ontario	
1946	Marion Saver	North York, Ontario	

- Connie-Gail Feller won the Miss Canada 1962 title and competed at Miss America, however was dethroned on 20 September 1961.

== Miss Canada at International Pageants ==
=== Miss Canada at Miss America and Canadian representatives at Miss America ===
This is a list of women that represented Canada at the Miss America pageant. Canada sent representatives in 1922, 1945, and from 1946 to 1963. In 1922 and 1945, the delegates that were sent competed as their local titles. From 1946 to 1963, the winner of Miss Canada represented Canada at Miss America.

- : Declared as Winner
- : Ended as runner-up or top 5/6 qualification
- : Ended as one of the finalists or semifinalists
- : Ended as special awards winner

Year	Miss Canada America	Local Title	Miss America Talent	Placement at Miss America	Special Awards at Miss America	Notes
No Representatives since 1964
1963	Helena “Nina” Marie Holden	Miss Victoria (BC)		Unplaced		
1962	Connie-Gail Feller	Miss Ottawa (ON)		Unplaced		
1961	Iris Elaine Thurlwell	Miss Northtown, Toronto (ON)	Vocal	Unplaced	Non-Finalist Talent Award (Best Popular Singer)	
1960	Rosemary Catherine Keenan	Miss Fredericton (NB)		Top 10		
1959	Danica d'Hondt	Miss Vancouver Centennial		Unplaced		
1958	Joan May Fitzpatrick	Miss Windsor (ON)		Unplaced		
1957	Dorothy Germaine Moreau	Miss Montreal (QC)		Top 10		
1956	Dalyce Gail Smith	Miss Whitehorse (YT)		Unplaced		
1955	Barbara Joan Markham	Miss Cornwall (ON)		Unplaced		
1954	Kathleen "Kathy" Ann Archibald	Miss Kelowna (BC)		Unplaced		
1953	Marilyn Delores Reddick	Miss Agincourt (ON)		Unplaced		
1952	Marjorie Alma Kelly	Miss Courtland (ON)		Unplaced	Special Non-Finalist Talent Scholarship ($1,000)	
1951	Margaret Eleanore Bradford	Miss Windsor (ON)		Unplaced		
Miss America title was postdated
1949	Margaret Lynn Munn	Miss Vancouver (BC)	Classical Vocal	Top 15	Preliminary Talent Award	
1948	Betty Jean Ferguson	Miss Halifax (NS)		Unplaced		
1947	Margaret Marshall	Miss Toronto (ON)		2nd Runner-Up	Preliminary Swimsuit Award	
1946	Marion Saver	Miss Stayner (ON)		Unplaced		
1945	Georgina Elizabeth Patterson	Miss Northern British Columbia (BC)		Unplaced	Miss Congeniality	Competed under local title at Miss America
No Representatives between 1923—1944
1922	Marie Gauthier	Miss Montreal (QC)	N/A	Unplaced		Multiple Canadian representatives Contestants competed under local title at Miss America
1922	Marjorie Smith	Miss Toronto (ON)	N/A	Unplaced		Multiple Canadian representatives Contestants competed under local title at Miss America
No Representative in 1921

== Hosts ==
Jaclyn Miles, a former Miss Canada: 2016-2025

Jim Perry: 1967-1991

Peter Jennings: 1963-1966

== See also ==
- Miss Earth Canada
- Miss Universe Canada
- Miss World Canada
- Miss Dominion of Canada
- Miss Canada International
- Miss Universe
- Miss America
