= Miss World Canada =

Canadian beauty pageant

- Formation: 1956 (as a title); 1980 (as a pageant)
- Purpose: Beauty pageant
- Headquarters: Toronto
- Location: Canada
- Official language: English
- Affiliations: Miss World; Miss Grand International; Miss Supranational
- Website: www.missworldcanada.net

Miss World Canada is an annual national beauty pageant held in Canada held annually since 1980. It selects a representative to Miss World. Prior to 1980, it was either a formal and/or informal title that referred to the Canadian representative at Miss World. The first year Canada competed at Miss World as Miss Canada (or Miss World Canada) was in 1957. In 2017 MTC-W Inc. obtained the rights to send the Canadian representative to Miss World. The chaired since 2016 is former Miss World Canada 1996 Michelle Weswaldi. The pageant is held each summer in Toronto, Ontario, but in 2020 the national competition was held on November 7.

In 2020, the head-to-head challenge competition was added as part of the selection process. All of the 44 candidates participated in an interview round hosted by Mr. World Canada 2012, Frankie Cena. The first winner was Aiona Santana.

== Representatives to Miss World ==
Colour key

- Declared the winner
- Finished as a runner-up
- Finished as a finalist or semifinalist.

Year	Miss World Canada	Province	Placement
2027	Alexa Grant	Ontario	TBD
2026	Angelina Fan	Ontario	Top 40
2025	Emma Morrison	Ontario	Unplaced
2024	No competition held		
2023	Jaime VandenBerg	Alberta	Top 40
2022	Due to the impact of COVID-19 pandemic, no Miss World pageant in 2020		
2021	Svetlana Mamaeva	Ontario	Top 40
2020	Due to the impact of COVID-19 pandemic, no Miss World pageant in 2020		
2019	Naomi Colford	Nova Scotia	Unplaced
2018	Hanna Begovic	Ontario	Unplaced
2017	Cynthia Menard	Ontario	Unplaced
2016	Anastasia Lin	Ontario	Unplaced
2015	Did not compete		
2014	Annora Bourgeault	Saskatchewan	Unplaced
2013	Camille Munro	Saskatchewan	Top 20
2012	Tara Teng	British Columbia	Unplaced
2011	Riza Santos	Alberta	Top 31
2010	Denise Garrido	Ontario	Top 25
2009	Lena Ma	Ontario	Top 7 & Miss World Talent
2008	Leah Ryerse	Ontario	Unplaced
2007	Sara Ghulam	Ontario	Unplaced
2006	Malgosia Majewska	Ontario	Top 17 & Miss World Sport
2005	Ramona Amiri	British Columbia	Top 15
2004	Tijana Arnautović	Ontario	Unplaced
2003	Nazanin Afshin-Jam	British Columbia	1st Runner-up, Queen of the Americas & Miss World Sport
2002	Lynsey Bennett	Ontario	Unplaced
2001	Tara Hall	Ontario	Unplaced
2000	Christine Cho	Ontario	Unplaced
1999	Mireille Eid	Ontario	Unplaced
1998	Leanne Baird	Ontario	Unplaced
1997	Keri-Lynn Power	Newfoundland and Labrador	Unplaced
1996	Michelle Weswaldi	Ontario	Unplaced
1995	Alissa Lehinki	Alberta	Unplaced
1994	Shawna Roberts	Alberta	Unplaced
1993	Tanya Memme	Ontario	Unplaced
1992	Nina Khilji	Ontario	Unplaced
1991	Did not compete		
1990	Natasha Palewandram	Ontario	Unplaced
1989	Leanne Caputo	Ontario	1st Runner-up & Queen of the Americas
1988	Morgan Fox	British Columbia	Unplaced
1987	Tracy Westerholm	British Columbia	Unplaced
1986	Wynne Kroontje	Ontario	Unplaced
1985	Mia Tambling	Ontario	Unplaced
1984	Connie Fitzpatrick	Ontario	1st Runner-up
1983	Katharine Durish	Ontario	Unplaced
1982	Jody Jensen	Alberta	Unplaced
1981	Earla Stewart	Ontario	Top 15
1980	Annette Labrecque	Quebec	Unplaced
Miss Dominion of Canada
1979	Catherine MacKintosh	Ontario	Unplaced
1978	Brigitte Hofmann	Ontario	Unplaced
1977	Marianne McKeen	Ontario	Unplaced
1976	Pamela Mercer	British Columbia	Unplaced
1975	Normande Jacques	Ontario	Unplaced
1974	Sandra Margaret Campbell	Ontario	Unplaced
1973	Deborah Ducharme	Ontario	Unplaced
1972	Bonny Brady	Ontario	Unplaced
1971	Lana Drouillard	Ontario	Unplaced
1970	Norma Joyce Hickey	Prince Edward Island	Unplaced
1969	Jacquie Perrin	Ontario	Unplaced
1968	Nancy Wilson	Ontario	Unplaced
1967	Donna Marie Barker	Ontario	Top 15
1966	Diane Coulter	Ontario	Top 15
1965	Carol Ann Tidey	Ontario	Top 7
1964	Mary Lou Farrell	Newfoundland	Unplaced
1963	Jane Kmita	Saskatchewan	Unplaced
1962	Marlene Leeson	Ontario	Unplaced
1961	Did not compete		
Miss Canada 1959 designated as Miss World Canada 1960
1960	Danica d'Hondt	British Columbia	Unplaced
Miss Maple Leaf
1959	Huguette Demers	Quebec	Unplaced
1959	Irene Dobler	Ontario	Removed
1958	Marilyn Anne Keddie	Manitoba	Top 12
Miss Toronto 1956 appointed as Miss World Canada 1957
1957	Judy Welch	Ontario	Unplaced
Miss Canada 1957 appointed as Miss World Canada 1956
1956	Dorothy Moreau	Quebec	Withdrew due to lack of sponsorship

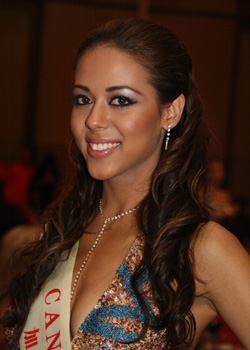
Miss World Canada 2007 Sara Ghulam

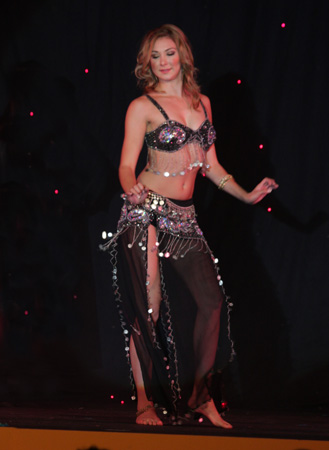
Miss World Canada 2008 Leah Ryerse

=== Winners by Province ===
Province	Titles	Winning Years
Ontario	44	1957, 1962, 1965, 1966, 1967, 1968, 1969, 1971, 1972, 1973, 1974, 1975, 1977, 1978, 1979, 1981, 1983, 1984, 1985, 1986, 1989, 1990, 1992, 1993, 1996, 1998, 1999, 2000, 2001, 2002, 2004, 2006, 2007, 2008, 2009, 2010, 2016, 2017, 2018, 2021, 2024, 2025, 2026, 2027
British Columbia	7	1960, 1976, 1987, 1988, 2003, 2005, 2012
Alberta	5	1982, 1994, 1995, 2011, 2023
Quebec	3	1956, 1959, 1980
Saskatchewan	3	1963, 2013, 2014
Newfoundland and Labrador	2	1964, 1997
Nova Scotia	1	2019
Prince Edward Island	1	1970
Manitoba	1	1958

==== Provinces that have not won ====
- New Brunswick
- Northwest Territories
- Nunavut
- Yukon

== Representatives to Miss Grand International ==
Colour key

- Declared as winner
- Finished as a runner-up
- Finished as finalist or semifinalist.

Year	Miss Grand Canada	Province	Placement & Performance		Notes	Ref.
Year	Miss Grand Canada	Province	Placements	Special award(s)	Notes	Ref.
By MTC-W Inc. (Miss World Canada); 2019–Present
2026	Patricia Seward	British Columbia	Unplaced		List: Previously crowned Miss World British Columbia 2022 and Miss Intercontinental Canada 2022 (Unplaced at Miss Intercontinental 2022).; Placed 3rd runner-up at Miss Universe Canada 2026 and received the Humanitarian Award.	
2025	Layanna Robinson	British Columbia	Unplaced		List: Previously crowned Miss Earth Canada 2023 (Top 20 at Miss Earth 2023).	
2024	Alivia Croal	Ontario	Unplaced			
2023	Yuliya Scherban	Saskatchewan	Unplaced		List: 2nd runner-up at Miss Universe Canada 2022.	
2022	Mildred Rincon	Alberta	Unplaced		List: Later won Miss Fitness Supermodel World 2025, competed at Reina Hispanoamericana 2025 (Unplaced; Miss Congeniality).; Top 10 at Miss Universe Canada 2023 and Miss Universe Canada 2024.	
2021	Olga Bykadorova	Quebec	Unplaced		List: Top 15 at Top Model of the World 2021 and also competed Miss Multiverse 2020.; Previously placed in the Top 15 and Top 8 at Miss World Canada 2019 and Miss World Canada 2020, respectively.; Later placed 4th runner-up and Top 10 at Miss Universe Canada 2023 and Miss Universe Canada 2024, respectively.	
2020	Sara Michelle Winter	British Columbia	Unplaced		List: Previously competed at Supermodel International 2012 and Top 15 at Top Model of the World 2014.; 1st runner-up at Miss World Canada 2020.; Competed at Miss Universe Canada thrice, Top 20 at Miss Universe Canada 2014, Top 10 at Both Miss Universe Canada 2019 and Miss Universe Canada 2020, respectively.; Previously competed at Miss Teen Canada 2011 (Miss Photogenic).	
2019	Brianna Plouffe	Quebec	Unplaced		List: 1st runner-up at Miss Globe Canada 2019.	

== See also ==
- Miss Canada
- Miss Universe Canada
- Miss Earth Canada
- Miss BC
