= Miss Canada International =

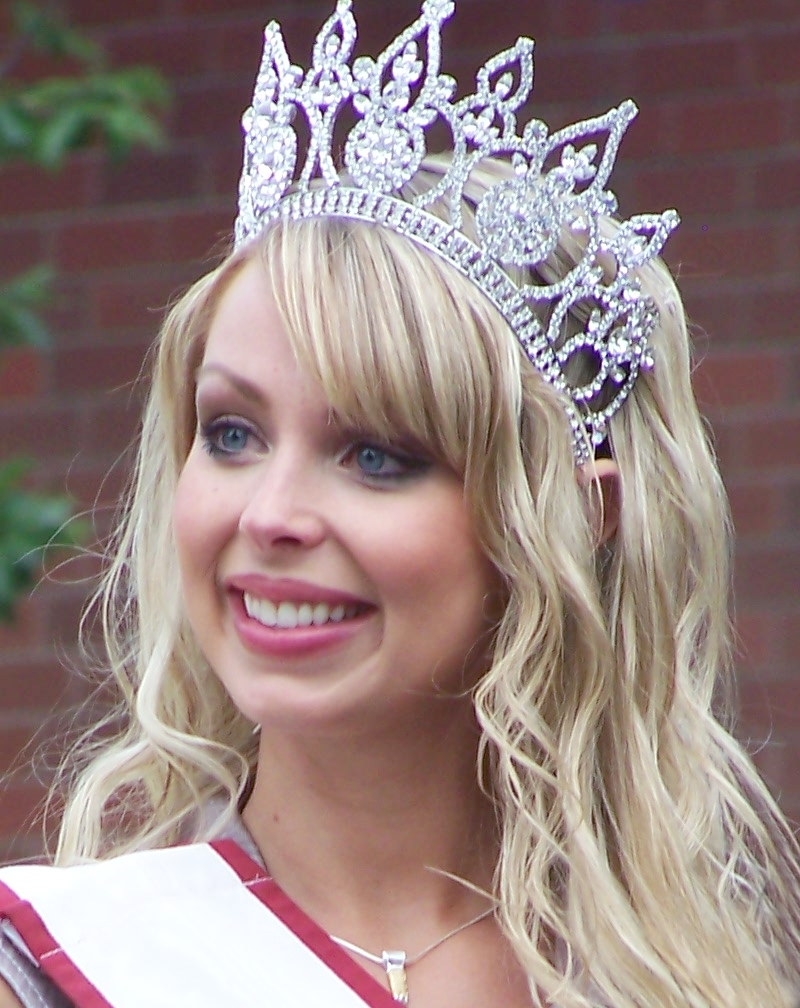
Miss Canada International 2008 Alesia Fieldberg

Miss Canada International & Miss Teen Canada International is a scholarship program for women in Canada. It was founded in 1995 and also has founded in 2005 The Teddy Bears of Hope Campaign in 2005 now "A Not For Profit Foundation" run by a board of directors. Miss Canada International and Miss Teen Canada International was purchased by GND Productions Corp.in 2012. Miss Canada International Inc. held the rights to send a Canadian representative to Miss World from 1997 to 2002.

== Winners ==
Year	Name	From	Notes
1995	Catherine Dunn	Orillia, Ontario	
1996	Danielle House	Daniel's Harbour, Newfoundland and Labrador	dethroned due to being charged with assault but not replaced
1997	Emily Ryan	Kentville, Nova Scotia	Ryan dethroned and replaced with Brooke Ross
1997	Brooke Ross	Chatham, Ontario	Ryan dethroned and replaced with Brooke Ross
1998	Leanne Baird	Stoney Creek, Ontario	
2000	Mireille Eid	Vanier, Ontario	As of 2000, the pageant was postdated. Eid won her title in 1999 but is considered Miss Canada International 2000.
2001	Christine Sunghee Cho	Ontario	
2002	Tara Lynn Hall	Thornhill, Ontario	
2003	Lynsey Bennett	Ottawa, Ontario	Bennett dethroned and replaced with Lorenza Sammarelli
2003	Lorenza Sammarelli	Vancouver, British Columbia	Bennett dethroned and replaced with Lorenza Sammarelli
2004	Meghan Williams	Vancouver, British Columbia	
2005	Nicole Kostrosky	Vernon, British Columbia	
2006/2007	Solange Tuyishime	Fredericton, New Brunswick	Jaillet refused to sign her contract to take on the title for 2007; as the 2006 winner, Tuyishime thus retained the title for 2007.
2006/2007	Rachel Jaillet	Sainte-Marie-de-Kent, New Brunswick	Jaillet refused to sign her contract to take on the title for 2007; as the 2006 winner, Tuyishime thus retained the title for 2007.
2008	Alesia Fieldberg	Calgary, Alberta	
2009	Catherine Thomas	Kelowna, British Columbia	
2010–2011	Bridget Nickerson	Yarmouth, Nova Scotia	Miss Canada International 2011 never took place; Nickerson is thus considered Miss Canada International for 2010 and 2011.
2012	Anna Dell	Williams Lake, British Columbia	
2013	Melanie Williamson	Kitchener, Ontario	
2014	Alyssa MacLeod	Cape Breton, Nova Scotia	

== Miss Teen Canada International Winners ==
Year	Name	From	Notes
1998	Nicole Gagnon	Yellowknife, Northwest Territories	
2000	Crystal Freake	Grand Falls-Windsor, Newfoundland and Labrador	
2001	Lorraine Savoie	Pokemouche, New Brunswick	
2002	Jeannie Ferguson	Tracadie-Sheila, New Brunswick	
2003	Vanessa Smythe	Ontario	Now an actress on Canadian television and theatre productions, featuring in several prominent commercials and a guest role on the medical program "Saving Hope".
2004	Katie Soltis	Abbotsford, British Columbia	
2005	Amanda Klyn	Windsor, Ontario	
2006	Kimberly Hooper	Kelowna, British Columbia	
2007	Haley Lang	Ottawa, Ontario	
2008	Cassondra Paletta	Hamilton, Ontario	
2009	Aubrey Hiddema	Ottawa, Ontario	
2010/2011	Molly Burke	Ontario	Burke was chosen as the titleholder but declined to take on the position, therefore it was given to Maan, her runner-up.
2010/2011	Suneet Maan	British Columbia	Burke was chosen as the titleholder but declined to take on the position, therefore it was given to Maan, her runner-up.
2012	Nakita Kohan	Edmonton, Alberta	
2013	Nikita Singh	Kitchener, Ontario	
