= Miss Earth Canada =

Canadian beauty pageant

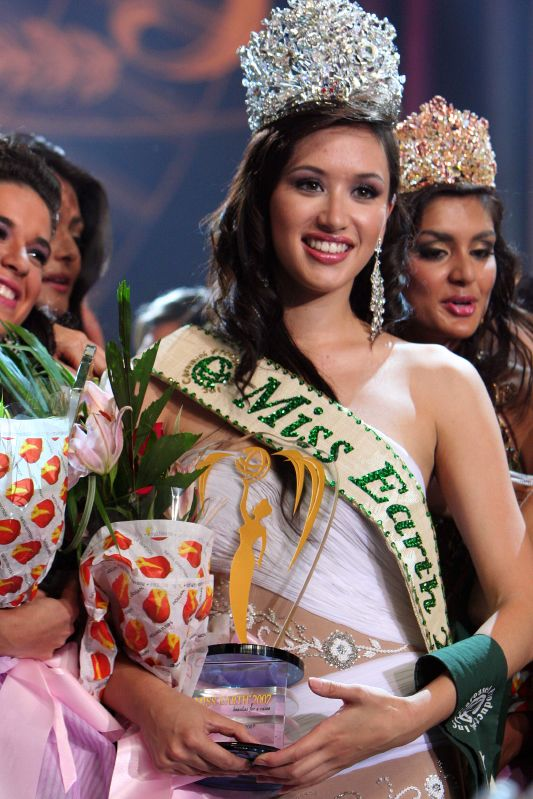
- 2007 winner, Jessica Trisko
- Formation: 2001
- Purpose: Beauty pageant
- Headquarters: Edmonton
- Location: Canada
- Official language: English
- Country Director: MTC-W inc
- Affiliations: Miss Earth
- Website: missearthcanada.net

Miss Earth Canada is a Canadian national beauty pageant that selects representatives to compete at the international Miss Earth pageant. Canada has participated in Miss Earth since its inaugural edition in 2001, when Michelle Weswaldi represented the country. Weswaldi is the founder and executive director of Pageant Group Canada, the organisation responsible for selecting Canadian representatives for international pageants, including Miss Earth.

The Miss Earth pageant is centred on environmental advocacy, promoting environmental awareness, conservation and the protection of the natural environment. Its delegates are expected to demonstrate knowledge of environmental issues and support initiatives dedicated to protecting the planet.

Canada first won Miss Earth, when Jessica Trisko competed against 87 other contestants, on 11 November 2007 at the University of the Philippines Theater in Quezon City, Philippines.

The 2026 titleholder is Sophia Koster.

== History ==
=== 2001–2002: Early years ===
At the inaugural Miss Earth 2001, Canada was represented by Michelle Carrie Lillian Weswaldi, followed by Melanie Grace Bennett of Vancouver, British Columbia, at Miss Earth 2002.

=== 2003–2018: Rosotro Productions ===
During this period, the Miss Earth Canada franchise was operated by Rosotro Production company, owned by Filipino-Canadian producer and national director Ronaldo Soriano Trono.Brooke Johnston was the first titleholder of this era in 2003.

Canada first won Miss Earth, when Jessica Trisko competed against 87 other contestants, on 11 November 2007 at the University of the Philippines Theater in Quezon City, Philippines..

Among the notable titleholders were Katherine McClure (2005), who received the Miss Friendship award at Miss Earth 2005; Riza Santos (2006), who received Miss Photogenic Award at Miss Earth 2006; and Denise Garrido (2008), who received the Miss Earth Puerto Princesa award at Miss Earth 2008.

Jaime VandenBerg, Miss Earth Canada 2018, was the final Canadian representative of this period. She competed at Miss Earth 2018 in the Philippines but withdrew from the competition before the coronation ceremony.

=== 2019: Calgary contest ===
In 2019, the pageant was held in Calgary, Alberta, on 30 August 2019 at the St. Vladimir Ukrainian Cultural Centre, with Mattea Henderson of Calgary winning the national title. Henderson subsequently represented Canada at Miss Earth 2019, held in the Philippines.

=== 2020–present: Pageant Group Canada ===
In 2020, the Miss Earth Canada delegation came under the direction of Michelle Weswaldi, founder and executive director of Pageant Group Canada. Weswaldi had previously represented Canada at Miss Earth 2001. The organisation selected Denise Gloren Guelos as Canada's representative at Miss Earth 2020, which was held virtually because of the COVID-19 pandemic.

=== Controversies ===
In November 2018, Jaime VandenBerg, withdrew from Miss Earth 2018 after alleging that a pageant sponsor had sexually harassed her and requested sexual favours in exchange for advancement in the competition. The allegations were also reported by The Philippine Star and Philippine Entertainment Portal.

In 2021, Laura Pastor won Miss Earth Canada 2021, and was replaced by Alice Li to represent Canada at Miss Earth 2021.

== Titleholders ==
Color key

- Declared the winner
- Finished as a runner-up
- Finished as a finalist or semifinalists
- Winner of a sub-award
- Withdrew from the international contest

The winner of Miss Earth Canada represents her country at Miss Earth.

Year	Miss Earth Canada	Region	Placement	Special awards	Notes
2001	Michelle Weswaldi	Woodbridge, Ontario	Unplaced		Currently serving the National Director of Pageant Group Canada.; Unplaced at Miss World 1996; Unplaced at Miss Intercontinental 2001
2002	Melanie Bennett	Surrey, British Columbia	Unplaced		
2003	Brooke Johnston	Montréal, Québec	Unplaced		
2004	Tanya Munizaga	Montréal, Québec	Unplaced	Best in Talent	
2005	Katherine McClure	Toronto, Ontario	Unplaced	Miss Friendship	
2006	Riza Santos	Calgary, Alberta	Unplaced	Miss Photogenic; Miss Fontana; Top 5 Best in Swimsuit; Top 15 Miss Talent	4th Runner-up at Miss Aura International 2006; Top 31 at Miss World 2011; Unplaced at Miss Universe 2013
2007	Jessica Trisko	Vancouver, British Columbia	Miss Earth 2007	Prinsesa Ng Kalikasan	
2008	Denise Garrido	Bradford, Ontario	Unplaced	Miss Earth Puerto Princess; Top 15 Best in Swimwear	Top 25 at Miss World 2010; Top 15 at Top Model of the World 2010
2009	Lateesha Ector	Pierrefonds, Quebec	Unplaced	Top 5 Best in Swimsuit (Group 2)	
2010	Summer Ross	Belle River, Ontario	Unplaced		
2011	Ashlea Moor	Lethbridge, Alberta	Unplaced		
2012	Valérie Rémillard	Saint-Félix-de-Valois, Quebec	Unplaced	(gold) Walk with M.E.	
2013	Sofiya Chorniy	Montréal, Québec	Unplaced		
2014	Cynthia Loewen	La Salle, Ontario	Unplaced		
2015	Tatiana Maranhao	Leamington, Ontario	Unplaced		
2016	Tamara Jemuovic	Toronto, Ontario	Unplaced		Unplaced at Miss Universe 2021; Appointed as Miss International Canada 2020
2017	Jacqueline Marsh	Thunder Bay, Ontario	Unplaced	(silver) National Costume competition (North America); Top 16 Best in Figure and Form	
2018	Jaime VandenBerg	Lethbridge, Alberta	Withdrew	People's Choice City Ambassadress	Top 40 at Miss World 2023; Top 30 at Miss Universe 2025; Appointed Miss International Canada 2021
2019	Mattea Henderson	Calgary, Alberta	Unplaced		1st Runner-up at Miss teen Universe 2014; Unplaced at Miss Intercontinental 2017
2020	Denise Gloren Guelos	Surrey, British Columbia	Unplaced		Unplaced at Miss Supranational 2019
2021	Alice Li	Toronto, Ontario	Unplaced		Unplaced at Miss Intercontinental 2018; Winner of Miss Global International 2019; Unplaced at Miss Suprantional 2021
2022	Jessica Cianchino	Toronto, Ontario	Unplaced	Miss Pontefino Hotel 2022; Miss Earth Ligao 2022; Miss Ever Bilena 2022	2nd Runner-up at Miss Asia Pacific 2019
2023	Layanna Robinson	Victoria, British Columbia	Top 20		She ended up 16 year long unplacement streak at Miss Earth .; Unplaced at Miss Grand International 2025
2024	Aleena Singh	Waterloo, Ontario	Unplaced		
2025	Hailey Wilson	Toronto, Ontario	Top 25		4th Runner-up at Miss Globe 2021
2026	Sophia Koster	Calgary, Alberta	TBA		Winner of Teen Petite International 2024

== See also ==
- Miss Universe Canada
- Miss World Canada
- Miss Grand Canada
