= Hồ Ngọc Hà =

Vietnamese singer and actress (born 1984)

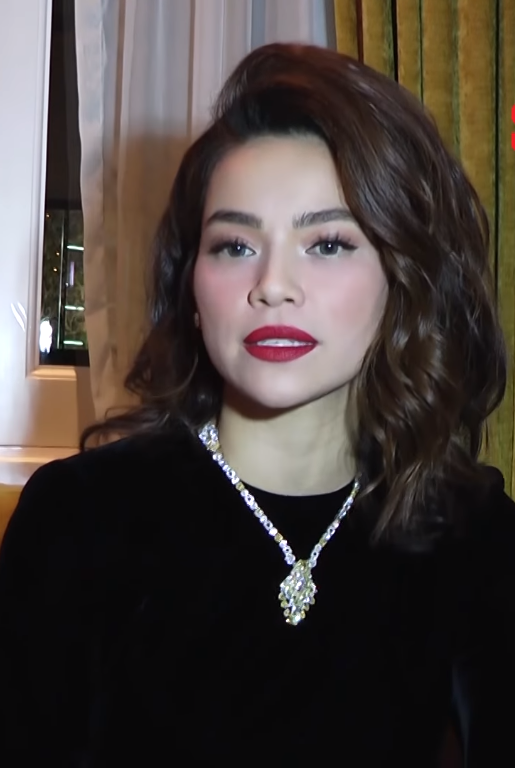
- Hồ Ngọc Hà in 2019
- Born: Hồ Thị Ngọc Hà; 25 November 1984 (age 41); Huế, Vietnam
- Height: 1.75 m (5 ft 9 in)
- Musical career
- Genres: V-pop; R&B; Dance-pop; Ballad
- Occupations: Singer; Actress; Model; TV personality; Entrepreneur
- Years active: 1997–
- Website: Official website

Hồ Thị Ngọc Hà (born 25 November 1984), known professionally as Hồ Ngọc Hà, is a Vietnamese singer, model, and actress. She began her singing career in 2004 with her debut album 24 Hours 7 Days. She also appeared in the films 39 Độ Yêu (Love in 39 Degrees), and Chiến Dịch Trái Tim Bên Phải (Right Heart Campaign).

In 2012, she received the Favorite Female Singer Award with 14,216 votes at the HTV Awards.

== Early life ==
Hà was born in An Cựu, Huế city of Thừa Thiên Huế province. She later moved to Quảng Bình province with her parents, who worked in banking. When she was 12 years old, she enrolled in the piano major at the Military University of Culture and Arts in Hanoi.

== Career ==
=== Music ===
==== 2003–2004: Debut Album 24 Hours 7 Days ====
After moving to Ho Chi Minh City in 2003, she made an appearance as a singer for the first time on the Người Đẹp Hát show. Later, Quoc Bao invited her to take part in a song on his upcoming album. After her appearance on Người Đẹp Hát, she pursued singing as a career path.

Hồ Ngọc Hà went to Hanoi and met with musician Huy Tuan to discuss working together on her debut album. Huy Tuan began working as the producer for her album, named 24 Giờ 7 Ngày, which was released in 2004 by Viet Tan Studio. The songs on the album were produced and composed by Tuan and numerous songwriters, including Duc Tri, Nguyen Xinh Xo, Hong Kien, Duong Thu, and An Hieu.

==== 2005: Và Em Đã Yêu ====
Hồ Ngọc Hà signed with Music Faces Records, the label run by songwriter Duc Tri, and the two collaborated on her second album. Released in June 2005 through Music Faces Records and Phuong Nam Films, the record was titled Và Em Đã Yêu. Half of its ten tracks were original compositions by Phuong Uyen, Ho Quang Minh, and Duc Tri, while the remainder were reworked versions of songs from her debut.

==== 2006: Muốn Nói Với Anh and Ảo Ảnh ====
Before her tour in the U.S., Hồ Ngọc Hà and other artists worked together on her third album named Muốn Nói Với Anh. The album was released on 15 December 2006 by Music Faces Records and Galaxy Studio in Vietnam and in the U.S. on 19 December 2016 by Music Faces Records. Huy Tuan and Duc Tri co-wrote the album, while Hồ Ngọc Hà wrote the lead single herself, and two songs were added from 24 Giờ 7 Ngày and Và Em Đã Yêu. There were three hit songs on this album: "Muốn Nói Với Anh" ("I Wanna Tell You"), "Giấc Mơ Chỉ Là Giấc Mơ ("Dream Is Only Dream"), and "Đời Bỗng Vui" ("Life Is Unexpectedly Happy").

During that time, Hồ Ngọc Hà and Duc Tuan released an album named Ảo Ảnh (Illusion), which was a collection of classic songs from famous musicians such as Y Van, Van Phung, Ngo Thuy Mien, Pham Manh Cuong, Do Le, Trong Khuong, and Huynh Anh. The album was released in Vietnam by Music Faces Records in September 2006 and in the US on 9 October 2006, by Music Published and Pops Worldwide.

==== 2007–2009: Khi Ta Yêu Nhau, The First Single and Và Em Đã Yêu Tour ====
In 2007, Hồ Ngọc Hà recorded her next album, Khi Ta Yêu Nhau (When We're In Love), released by Music Faces Records. The album did not perform well commercially.

In 2009, she released the album The First Single after a two-year hiatus. "Xin Hãy Thứ Tha" ("My Apology"), featuring rapper Suboi, is one of her songs. Later that year, Hồ Ngọc Hà represented Vietnam at the Asia Song Festival in Korea, performing the English version of "My Apology".

In 2009, Hồ Ngọc Hà became the brand ambassador of Sunsilk Vietnam. Hà took the Và Em Đã Yêu Tour across Vietnam starting in September 2009, and fans could exchange Sunsilk shampoo bottles for tickets to her shows. The tour started on 27 September 2009 in Ho Chi Minh City and concluded on 10 October 2009 in Can Tho. The performance included guests such as Dam Vinh Hung, Dan Truong, Phan Dinh Tung, Quang Vinh, Pham Anh Khoa, Cao Thai Son, Lam Truong, and Nguyen Vu. The Và Em Đã Yêu show was aired live on HTV7 and Sunsilk's official website.

==== 2010–early 2011: Motherhood, New Album Release ====
After giving birth, Hồ Ngọc Hà came back with her new album titled Tìm Lại Giấc Mơ (Finding Dreams) in 2010, which she had recorded during her pregnancy. This was her first album without Duc Tri's collaboration and the last album released by Music Faces Records. Duc Tri openly supported her departure. The album was released in Vietnam on 10 July 2011 and in the US on 21 July 2011. The album included songs written by songwriters Nguyen Hong Thuan, Quoc An, Hoang Anh, Duong Khac Linh, and Hoang Huy Long. "Thêm Một Lần Vỡ Tan" ("One More Break Up") was composed and written by Hồ Ngọc Hà herself. However, the audiences compared the song to Kylie Minogue's "Red Blooded Woman". In response, she said the two songs were completely different and she was not responsible for the final production and remix.

Hồ Ngọc Hà and the V-Music band partnered up for their album Ngày Hạnh Phúc (Happy Day) released in August 2010. This was her second duet album, her first project without the production of Duc Tri and Music Faces Records, and her third collaboration with Viet Tan Studio. Nikon also sponsored this album.

==== 2011: Invincible ====
In mid 2011, she released two new singles, "Sao Ta Lặng Im" ("Why We Keep Silence"), written and composed by Nguyen Hong Thuan, and "Nỗi Nhớ Đầy Vơi" ("Nonstop Missing"), featuring Noo Phuoc Thinh. Shortly afterward, the ballad single "Một Lần Cuối Thôi" ("Last Time") was released as an opening for her sixth album Invincible – Sẽ Mãi Bên Nhau (Forever Together), which was scheduled to be released at the end of 2011.

On 15 December 2011, she held a live concert at Lan Anh Club in Ho Chi Minh City, directed by Viet Tu, featuring 25 songs. The live show was nominated for the Devotion Award 2011 in April 2012.

==== 2012: The Voice coach and The Second Single ====
In 2012, Hồ Ngọc Hà and the V-Music band released a new project I Love You, a collection of eight songs composed by Nguyen Hong Thuan, Quoc An, Phuc Bo, Phuong Uyen, and Kien Tran.

In 2012, Vietnam became the second Asian country that obtained the license for the game show franchise The Voice, after South Korea. Hà was announced as one of the judges on The Voice of Vietnam, alongside other well-known singers in Vietnam, namely Dam Vinh Hung, Thu Minh, and Tran Lap. Before taking up the role, Hà had a small operation on her vocal cords.

She was the judge of Centaur Dance Showdown, an international dance competition. She was invited to the show where the Vietnam team competed with other teams from different countries, along with Singaporean hip-hop dancer Sheikh Haikel and famous Japanese break-dancer Katsuyuki Ishikawa.

In September 2012, while serving as a judge of The Voice Vietnam, she released "Đắn Đo" ("Wondering") and "Chôn Giấu Một Tình Yêu" ("Hidden Love"). Her song "Runaway" is the English version of the song "Mãi Mãi Về Sau". "Đắn Đo" ("Wondering") was chosen to be the head single.

==== 2013: Got To Dance judge ====
Hồ Ngọc Hà did a catwalk with supermodel Thanh Hang in a dress inspired by poisonous mushrooms designed by Cong Tri during the 11th Đẹp Fashion Show. She was a judge of Got to Dance along with dancer Alfredo Torres, Vietnamese-American hip hop dancer Dumbo, and dance choreographer Tran Ly Ly.

On 5 August 2013, at Asian Music Stars Show held by China's CCTV, with the participation of singers from 10 countries and regions, she performed live two songs "Mãi Mãi Về Sau" ("Runaway") and "Hãy Thứ Tha Cho Em" ("Please Forgive Me").

On 12 August 2013, she released songs "Hãy Thứ Tha Cho Em" (composed by Duong Khac Linh, written by Hoang Huy Long) and "Giấu Anh Vào Nỗi Nhớ" ("Keep You In My Thought"). At the 16th Green Waves Award, she won "Single of the Year" Award for "Hãy Thứ Tha Cho Em" and the Top 10 Favorite Singers.

==== 2014: X Factor and Hồ Ngọc Hà Live Concert 2014 ====
On 12 May 2014, she released the album Mối Tình Xưa ("Old Love"), which was inspired by classic genres from ten years ago. The album included eleven songs composed by Duc Tri, Nguyen Hong Thuan, Chau Dang Khoa, and Pham Toan Thang. "It could be said that I use these 11 songs to tell a story about my 10 years including career, love and failure", she said.

She accepted a deal to be a judge on X Factor's first season in Vietnam.

On 20 November 2014, her live concert was held in the Gem Center in Saigon. Her eight hits were linked together to make a 40-minute-long musical story with choreography by John Huy Tran, Ngoc Tu, and American choreographer John-Paul "JP" San Pedro. Live Concert 2014 was the capstone of her 10-year singing career.

==== 2016: Love Songs ====
In May 2016, she held a concert entitled Love Songs in Ho Chi Minh City. Following this, Hà took Love Songs on tour in Vietnam, the United States, Australia, and Europe.

=== Modeling ===
==== Early success ====
Before making a name for herself as a singer, Hồ Ngọc Hà was a model. Hà started modeling at the age of 15. In 2000, at the age of 16, she won the second prize in the Hanoi Supermodel competition (Siêu mẫu Hà Nội in Vietnamese). In the following year, she won the top prize inVietnam Supermodel competition (Siêu mẫu Việt Nam). In 2002, Hà won the Silver Prize in the Asian Supermodel competition ("Tìm kiếm người mẫu châu Á" in Vietnamese).

==== Coaching and television appearances ====
Later, Hà shifted towards pursuing music, with modelling taking more of a backseat role in her career. In 2016, Hà was a coach on the first series of The Face Vietnam, alongside Miss Universe Vietnam 2015 Pham Huong and Miss World Vietnam 2015 Lan Khue. Under Ha's mentorship, the contestant Phí Phương Anh became the first-ever winner of The Face franchise in Vietnam. In addition, two other mentees in Ha's team were also successful in the show: Chúng Huyền Thanh finished the season as one of the runners-up, and Lilly Nguyễn received a special prize from the show's sponsor.

In 2018, Hà was a special guest on Series 6 of Asia's Next Top Model, hosted by Thailand's Cindy Bishop, who went on to praise Hà's work ethic.

In 2023, Hà was again appointed as one of the coaches on the inaugural season of The New Mentor. This Vietnamese reality TV competition sought to train a new generation of models with leadership qualities for the high-end fashion industry. Hà was joined by supermodels Lan Khue and Thanh Hang, as well as pageant queen Huong Giang on the show. Nhu Van, who was Ha's mentee on the show, finished as a joint runner-up. Despite not winning the show, Nhu Van went on to win several national and international pageant competitions, including Miss Global 2025.

==== Luxury fashion houses ====
Hà has also collaborated with prominent luxury fashion houses. In 2024, Hà was chosen by the Italian luxury fashion house Bulgari as an ambassador, a "friend of the house". Hà has also worked with Gucci, most recently as an ambassador of its Ancora campaign in Vietnam. Hà has twice attended Milan Fashion Week with Gucci, namely as a guest at its Fall/Winter 2017 and Spring 2025 shows.

=== Acting ===
After releasing two solo albums, Hà returned to acting in 2025, starring in the TV series 39 Độ Yêu (39 Degrees of Love), a 16-episode TV adaptation of a Vietnamese movie of the same name. However, the series was not well received, with VnExpress describing it as a "clumsy magic show." Later, Hà was cast in the movie titled Chiến Dịch Trái Tim Bên Phải (Right Heart Campaign), playing an early-career teacher, Ms. Hoai An.

In 2015, after a 10-year hiatus from acting, Hà played a minor role in the musical comedy film, Hy Sinh Đời Trai (A Waste of a Man's Life), one of more than 30 Vietnamese celebrities cast in the film. The film was pulled from most major cinemas in the country within its first three weeks. Despite Hà only appearing in a cameo role, her image took up more space on the film's poster than those of the main cast. In an interview, director Lưu Huỳnh claimed that it was against his and Hà's wishes to use her image to promote the film, alleging that it was the film's producer who made that decision.

== Artistic styles ==
=== Performance style ===
In an interview from 2007, she said that after seeing Beyoncé's performance in Bangkok, Thailand, she was inspired and attempted to "learn Beyoncé's performing style."

=== Business ventures ===
In 2018, Hà co-founded her cosmetic brand M.O.I., which was said to be "the first professional cosmetics brand developed and operated by Vietnamese people." In 2021, M.O.I. launched a skincare line, DA, which stands for Dermatologist Advised. In 2023, M.O.I. was ranked by Euromonitor International in Vietnam's top 10 makeup brands as the only domestic brand on the list.

== Personal life ==
=== Relationships ===
At the start of Hà's music career, she was romantically linked to songwriter Duc Tri, who produced her first four albums as well as writing many of her hit songs. Despite their breakup, Hà and Duc Tri have continued to collaborate in their music careers. Hà has credited Duc Tri to kickstarting her music career, "Without the guidance of musician Duc Tri, there would be no singer Hồ Ngọc Hà".

Hà was previously married to businessman Nguyen Quoc Cuong. Hà and Cuong had a son, Nguyen Quoc Hung, born in 2010.

Following her divorce from Cuong, Hà started dating Swedish-Vietnamese Actor Kim Ly in 2017, after Ly appeared in one of her music videos. In 2020, Hà gave birth to their twin children, Lisa and Leon. Ly proposed to her at the hospital after the birth of their children and they registered their marriage in the same year, despite not organizing a wedding to mark the occasion. Hà has said that she prefers private celebrations of their anniversary and a small, private wedding over a big wedding with many guests.

=== Family ===
Hà is of partly French ancestry through her father, Ho Si An, who is French-Vietnamese. Hà has a close relationship with her mother, Ngoc Huong, who she has said to help her with raising her three children. Both of Hà's parents were affected by the wars in Vietnam: her father as a veteran and her mother as an orphan after losing her mother to the war at a young age.

== Philanthropy ==
Hà donated money to 20 families living in Hoa Hiep Nam Ward.

In 2011, she and other singers participated in the show Tổ Ấm Ngày Xuân by the Citizen Committee of Ho Chi Minh City and the Bureau of Ho Chi Minh City at Tao Đàn Park. At the show, she gave away 200 presents and 400 lucky money envelopes for orphans and children living in unfortunate conditions in Ho Chi Minh City. She was rewarded with an honorary award from the Citizen Committee of Ho Chi Minh City.

In 2025, for her 41st birthday, Hà refused presents from her friends and instead asked for donations to those affected by the 2025 Central Vietnam floods, raising a total of 300 million Vietnam Dong.

== Filmography ==
- Hoa Cỏ May (2001) – Hương
- 39 độ yêu (2005)
- Chiến dịch trái tim bên phải (2005)
- Hi sinh đời trai (2015)

=== Television ===
- The Voice of Vietnam of (2012) – Judge (one season)
- Got To Dance (2013) – Judge (Season 1)
- X Factor (2014) – Judge (Season 1)
- The Remix (2015–2016) – Judge (Season 1 – 2)
- Vietnam Super Model (2016) – Judge
- The Face Vietnam (2016) – Mentor (Season 1)
- Asia's Next Top Model (2018) – Special guest (Season 6)
- Your Face Sound Familiar Vietnam (2019–2020) – Judge (Season 7)

== Discography ==
=== Albums ===
==== Studio albums ====
Title	Details
24 Giờ 7 Ngày	Released: 24 June 2004; Label: Viết Tân Studio; Formats: CD, digital download
Và Em Đã Yêu	Released: 3 July 2005; Label: Music Faces; Formats: CD, digital download
Muốn Nói Với Anh	Released: 19 December 2006; Label: Music Faces; Formats: CD, digital download
Khi Ta Yêu Nhau	Released: 15 May 2008; Label: Music Faces; Formats: CD, digital download
Tìm Lại Giấc Mơ	Released: 20 July 2010; Label: Hồ Ngọc Hà Entertainment; Formats: CD, digital download
Invincible (Sẽ Mãi Bên Nhau)	Released: 17 October 2011; Label: Hồ Ngọc Hà Entertainment; Formats: CD, digital download
Mối Tình Xưa	Released: 12 May 2014; Label: Hồ Ngọc Hà Entertainment; Formats: CD, digital download

==== Collaborative albums ====
Title	Details
Ảo Ảnh (with Đức Tuấn)	Released: 20 August 2006; Label: Music Faces; Formats: CD, digital download
Ngày Hạnh Phúc (with V.Music)	Released: 14 February 2011; Label: Hồ Ngọc Hà Entertainment, T Production; Formats: CD, digital download
I Love You (with V.Music)	Released: 14 February 2012; Label: Hồ Ngọc Hà Entertainment, T Production; Formats: CD, digital download

==== Compilations ====
Title	Details
Love Songs Collection: Nơi Em Gặp Anh	Released: 19 May 2009; Label: Music Faces; Formats: CD, digital download
Love Songs Collection 2: Vẫn Trong Đợi Chờ	Released: 12 December 2010; Label: Music Faces, Hồ Ngọc Hà Entertainment; Formats: CD, digital download
Love Songs Collection 3: Gửi Người Yêu Cũ	Released: 26 September 2016; Label: Hồ Ngọc Hà Entertainment; Formats: CD, digital download
Love Songs Collection 4: Càng Trưởng Thành, Càng Cô Đơn	Released: 20 August 2020; Label: Hồ Ngọc Hà Entertainment, T Production; Formats: CD, digital download

==== Single albums ====
Title	Details
The First Single	Released: 30 July 2009; Label: Music Faces; Formats: CD, DVD, digital download
Hạnh Phúc Bất Tận (with V.Music)	Released: 9 February 2010; Label: Hồ Ngọc Hà Entertainment, T Production; Formats: CD, digital download
Nano	Released: 8 March 2011; Label: Hồ Ngọc Hà Entertainment; Formats: Digital download
Nỗi Nhớ Đầy Vơi (with Noo Phước Thịnh)	Released: 29 April 2011; Label: Hồ Ngọc Hà Entertainment; Formats: CD, digital download
The Second Single	Released: 10 October 2012; Label: Hồ Ngọc Hà Entertainment; Formats: CD, DVD, digital download
Bay Lên Tình Yêu (Blow Up)	Released: 1 December 2012; Label: Hồ Ngọc Hà Entertainment; Formats: CD, DVD, digital download
Hãy Thứ Tha Cho Em	Released: 12 August 2013; Label: Hồ Ngọc Hà Entertainment; Formats: CD, DVD, digital download

=== Singles ===
==== As lead artist ====
===== 2000s =====
Title	Year	Album	Ref
"Đêm Nghe Tiếng Mưa"	2005	Và Em Đã Yêu	
"Giấc Mơ Chỉ Là Giấc Mơ"	2006	Muốn Nói Với Anh	
"Muốn Nói Với Anh"	2007	Muốn Nói Với Anh	
"Xin Hãy Thứ Tha" (feat. Suboi)	2009	The First Single	

===== 2010s =====
Title	Year	Album	Ref
"Hạnh Phúc Bất Tận" (with V.Music)	2010	Hạnh Phúc Bất Tận	
"Tìm Lại Giấc Mơ"	2010	Tìm Lại Giấc Mơ	
"Sao Ta Lặng Im"	2011	Love Songs Collection 2: Vẫn Trong Đợi Chờ	
"Ngày Hạnh Phúc" (with V.Music)	2011	Ngày Hạnh Phúc	
"Nỗi Nhớ Đầy Vơi" (with Noo Phước Thịnh)	2011	Nỗi Nhớ Đầy Vơi	
"Một Lần Cuối Thôi"	2011	Non-album single	
"Sẽ Mãi Bên Nhau (Invincible)"	2011	Invincible (Sẽ Mãi Bên Nhau)	
"Từ Ngày Anh Đi"	2011	Invincible (Sẽ Mãi Bên Nhau)	
"I Love You" (with V.Music)	2012	I Love You	
"Hãy Nói Với Em"	2012	I Love You	
"Đắn Đo"	2012	The Second Single	
"Bay Lên Tình Yêu (Blow Up)"	2012	Bay Lên Tình Yêu (Blow Up)	
"Hãy Mặc Em Đi"	2013	Bay Lên Tình Yêu (Blow Up)	
"Hãy Thứ Tha Cho Em"	2013	Hãy Thứ Tha Cho Em	
"Giấu Anh Vào Nỗi Nhớ"	2013	Hãy Thứ Tha Cho Em	
"Mối Tình Xưa"	2014	Mối Tình Xưa	
"Em Không Cần Anh"	2014	Mối Tình Xưa	
"Cô Đơn Giữa Cuộc Tình"	2014	Mối Tình Xưa	
"Người Tình Ơi / My Baby"	2014	Mối Tình Xưa	
"Xóa Ký Ức"	2014	Non-album single	
"Em Đi Tìm Anh" (with Noo Phước Thịnh)	2015	Non-album single	
"What Is Love?"	2015	Non-album single	
"Tội Lỗi"	2015	Non-album single	
"Destiny"	2015	Non-album single	
"Đừng Đi"	2016	Non-album single	
"Keep Me In Love" (feat. Kimmese)	2016	Non-album single	
"Gửi Người Yêu Cũ"	2016	Love Songs Collection 3: Gửi Người Yêu Cũ	
"Chạy Theo Lý Trí"	2016	Love Songs Collection 3: Gửi Người Yêu Cũ	
"Sợ" (with Thu Minh)	2017	Non-album single	
"Cả Một Trời Thương Nhớ"	2017	Non-album single	
"Say Goodbye"	2017	Non-album single	
"Em Muốn Anh Đưa Em Về"	2018	Non-album single	
"Hạnh Phúc Là Đây (Live Beyond)"	2019	Non-album single	

===== 2020s =====
Title	Year	Peak chart positions		Album	Ref
Title	Year	VN Hot 100	VN Top Vietnamese	Album	Ref
"Vì Chính Là Em"	2022	—	—	Non-album single	
"Cô Đơn Trên Sofa"	2022	9	4	Non-album single	
"Lời Nói Dối Ngọc Ngà"	2023	—	—	Non-album single	
"Ai Chung Tình Bằng Cô Đơn" (with Noo Phước Thịnh)	2023	—	—	Non-album single	
"Kỳ Quan Thứ 8" (with Nguyễn Hồng Thuận)	2023	—	—	Non-album single	
"Gặp Đúng Lúc Yêu Đúng Người"	2023	—	—	Non-album single	
"Tự Nhiên"	2024			Non-album single	
"Bài Hát Dành Cho Con"	2024			Non-album single	
"Hừng Đông (Breaking Dawn)"	2024			Non-album single	

==== As featured artist ====
Title	Year	Peak chart positions		Album	Ref
Title	Year	VN Hot 100	VN Top Vietnamese	Album	Ref
"Lặng Thầm Một Tình Yêu" (Thanh Bùi feat. Hồ Ngọc Hà)	2010	(Note: Billboard Vietnam was launched on 14 January 2022.)		Để Mai Tính OST	
"Bữa Tiệc Phù Hoa" (Hoàng Rob feat. Hồ Ngọc Hà & Touliver)	2022	—	—	Mùa Hè Vĩnh Cửu	

=== Promotional singles ===
Title	Year	Album	Ref
"Những Mùa Xuân Dịu Dàng"	2004	Chúc Mừng Năm Mới	
"Tóc Hát"	2004	Non-album promotional single	
"Và Em Đã Yêu"	2005	Và Em Đã Yêu	
"Em Vẫn Muốn Yêu Anh"	2008	Khi Ta Yêu Nhau	
"Vì Anh Đánh Mất" (with Lệ Quyên)	2008	Khi Ta Yêu Nhau	
"Trót Yêu Anh Rồi"	2008	Khi Ta Yêu Nhau	
"Chỉ Là"	2011	Nano	
"Yêu Sao Mái Tóc Việt Nam" (with V.Music)	2011	Non-album promotional single	
"Mãi Mãi Về Sau"	2012	Invincible (Sẽ Mãi Bên Nhau)	
"Dance All Night"	2014	Non-album promotional single	
"Thức Tỉnh"	2014	Ngày Hạnh Phúc	
"Mùa Đẹp Nhất"	2015	Gala Nhạc Việt 5: Xuân Đất Việt, Tết Quê Hương	
"Chơi Vơi"	2015	Non-album promotional single	
"Mình Thích Thì Mình Yêu Thôi" (with Noo Phước Thịnh)	2016	Non-album promotional single	
"Chợt Nhớ Về Anh"	2016	Love Songs Collection 3: Gửi Người Yêu Cũ	
"Chúc Tết Mọi Nhà" (feat. Noo Phước Thịnh)	2017	Non-album promotional single	
"Giá Như Mình Đã Bao Dung"	2018	Non-album promotional single	
"Vẻ Đẹp 4.0"	2019	Non-album promotional single	
"Không Lùi Bước"	2019	Cậu Chủ Ma Cà Rồng OST	
"Bức Thư Để Lại" (with R.Tee)	2019	Non-album promotional single	
"Điều Ước Của Mùa Xuân"	2020	Non-album promotional single	
"Cự Tuyệt"	2020	Love Songs Collection 4: Càng Trưởng Thành, Càng Cô Đơn	
"Quẳng Gánh Lo Đi Mà Ăn Tết"	2021	Non-album promotional single	
"Rồi Một Ngày Mình Nói Về Tình Yêu"	2021	Love Songs Collection 4: Càng Trưởng Thành, Càng Cô Đơn	
"Một Đêm Vui Vẻ" (with Blacka)	2022	Non-album promotional single	
"Walk Walk – Theo Chân Em Bước (The New Mentor)"	2023	Non-album promotional single	

=== Other charted songs ===
Title	Year	Peak chart positions		Album
Title	Year	VN Hot 100	VN Top Vietnamese	Album
"Như Hoa Mùa Xuân" (with Thủy Tiên & Minh Hằng)	2023	—	79	Gala Nhạc Việt 3: Hương Sắc Tết Việt

== Performances ==
Year	Title	Sponsor	Venues	Notes
2009	Tour: "I fall in love" (VÀ EM ĐÃ YÊU)	Sunsilk	universities in Ho Chi Minh City, Ha Noi Capital, Da Nang City, Da Lat City, Can Tho City, Hai Phong City.	35,000 attendees
2010	Liveshow: "Find A Dream " (Tìm lại giấc mơ)	Sunsilk, YAN TV, HTV (HCM Television)	Ho Chi Minh City, Ha Noi Capital	12,000 attendees
2011	Liveshow: Hồ Ngọc Hà live concert 2011	Sunsilk, YAN TV, HNH productions.	Ho Chi Minh City	Production cost: 5 billion đồng
2014	Liveshow: Hồ Ngọc Hà live concert 2014	HNH productions, GALA Nhạc Việt, Sunsilk, YAN TV, 38 Flower, Zing Mp3, Ashley Furniture, Khơ Thị, VP Bank, M.	Ho Chi Minh City	2,000 attendees
2014–2015	Tour: Hồ Ngọc Hà tour xuyên Việt	Sunsilk, Con Gà Trống, LAVIE, VIETJET AIR, GALA Nhạc Việt, HNH productions, OPPO.	universities in Ho Chi Minh City, Ha Noi Capital, Da Nang City, Can Tho City.	5,000 – 10,000 attendees per night
2015	Destiny		Miss Universe Vietnam 2015	
2016	Live show: Love Songs (Tình Ca)	GALA Nhạc Việt, HNH productions, OPPO.	Ho Chi Minh City, Ha Noi Capital	800–1,000 attendees per night

== Awards ==
=== Major awards ===
Dedication Music Awards

Dedication Music Awards, is an annual music award presented by Sports and Culture, an entertainment newspaper in Vietnam, to recognize the discoveries and creations contributed to the richness and development of Viet Nam pop music. The award is considered as a "Grammy Award" in Vietnamese music.

Year	Category	Artist/Nominated work	Result	Note
2006	Best Album of the Year	Và Em Đã Yêu	Nominated	
2008	Best Female Artist of the Year	Hồ Ngọc Hà Ngọc Hồ	Won	
2009	Best Artist of the Year	Hồ Ngọc Hà Ngọc Hồ	Nominated	
2012	Best Show of the Year	Hồ Ngọc Hà Live Concert 2011	Won	
2015	Best Show of the Year	Hồ Ngọc Hà Live Concert 2014	Nominated	
2015	Best Artist of the Year	Hồ Ngọc Hà Ngọc Hồ	Nominated	
2017	Best Artist of the Year	Hồ Ngọc Hà Ngọc Hồ	Nominated	
2017	Best Album of the Year	Love Songs Collection 3: Gửi Người Yêu Cũ	Nominated	
2017	Best Show of the Year	Love Songs	Nominated	
2018	Best Show of the Year	Love Songs 2: Cả Một Trời Thương Nhớ	Nominated	
2018	Best Artist of the Year	Hồ Ngọc Hà Ngọc Hồ	Nominated	
2018	Best Music Video of the Year	"Cả Một Trời Thương Nhớ"	Nominated	
2022	Best Music Video of the Year	"Cô Đơn Trên Sofa"	Nominated	
2022	Best Female Artist of the Year	Hồ Ngọc Hà Ngọc Hồ	Nominated	

Golden Apricot Blossom Awards

Year	Category	Artist/Nominated work	Result	Note
2005	Favorite TV Series & Movie Actress	Chiến dịch trái tim bên phải	Nominated	
2005	Favorite Female Pop Singer		Nominated	
2007	Favorite Female Pop Singer	"Giấc Mơ Chỉ Là Giấc Mơ"	Nominated	
2008	Favorite Female Pop Singer	"Trót Yêu Anh Rồi"	Nominated	
2009	Favorite Female Pop Singer	"Xin Hãy Thứ Tha"	Nominated	
2010	Song of the Year	"Tìm Lại Giấc Mơ"	Nominated	
2011	Favorite Female Pop Singer	"Tìm Lại Giấc Mơ"	Won	
2012	Favorite Female Pop Singer	"Một Lần Cuối Thôi"	Won	
2013	Song of the Year	"Hãy Thứ Tha Cho Em"	Nominated	
2014	Favorite Female Pop Singer	"Cô Đơn Giữa Cuộc Tình"	Nominated	
2015	Favorite Female Pop Singer	"What Is Love?"	Nominated	
2016	Favorite Female Pop Singer	"Chạy Theo Lý Trí"	Nominated	
2017	Favorite Female Pop Singer	"Cả Một Trời Thương Nhớ"	Nominated	

Green Wave Music Awards

Green Wave Music Awards is one of the oldest and most prestigious annual music awards in the Vietnamese music industry. It was started in 1997 with the governing body being the 99.9 MHz FM radio station of the Voice of the People of Ho Chi Minh City.

Year	Category	Artist/Nominated work	Result	Note
2005	New Female Artist of the Year	Hồ Ngọc Hà Ngọc Hồ	Won	
2006	Top 10 Artists of the Year	Hồ Ngọc Hà Ngọc Hồ	Recipient	
2007	Top 10 Artists of the Year	Hồ Ngọc Hà Ngọc Hồ	Recipient	
2008	Top 10 Artists of the Year	Hồ Ngọc Hà Ngọc Hồ	Recipient	
2009	Top 10 Artists of the Year	Hồ Ngọc Hà Ngọc Hồ	Recipient	
2009	Female Artist of the Year	Hồ Ngọc Hà Ngọc Hồ	Won	
2010	Album of the Year	Tìm Lại Giấc Mơ	Nominated	
2010	Top 10 Artists of the Year	Hồ Ngọc Hà Ngọc Hồ	Recipient	
2011	Top 10 Artists of the Year	Hồ Ngọc Hà Ngọc Hồ	Recipient	
2011	Female Artist of the Year	Hồ Ngọc Hà Ngọc Hồ	Nominated	
2011	Album of the Year	Love Songs Collection 2: Vẫn Trong Đợi Chờ	Won	
2012	Album of the Year	Invincible (Sẽ Mãi Bên Nhau)	Won	
2012	Female Artist of the Year	Hồ Ngọc Hà Ngọc Hồ	Nominated	
2012	Top 10 Artists of the Year	Hồ Ngọc Hà Ngọc Hồ	Recipient	
2013	Top 10 Artists of the Year	Hồ Ngọc Hà Ngọc Hồ	Recipient	
2013	Single of the Year	"Hãy Thứ Tha Cho Em"	Won	
2013	Single of the Year	"Hãy Mặc Em Đi"	Nominated	
2014	Album of the Year	Mối Tình Xưa	Won	
2014	Top 5 Artists of the Year – Top Gold	Hồ Ngọc Hà Ngọc Hồ	Recipient	
2015	Top 5 Artists of the Year – Top Gold	Hồ Ngọc Hà Ngọc Hồ	Recipient	
2015	Single of the Year	"What Is Love?"	Nominated	
2016	Single of the Year	"Gửi Người Yêu Cũ"	Nominated	
2016	Music Project of the Year	Love Songs Collection 3: Gửi Người Yêu Cũ	Recipient	
2016	Top 5 Artists of the Year – Top Gold	Hồ Ngọc Hà Ngọc Hồ	Recipient	
2017	Top 5 Artists of the Year – Top Gold	Hồ Ngọc Hà Ngọc Hồ	Recipient	
2020	Music Project of the Year	Love Songs Collection 4: Càng Trưởng Thành, Càng Cô Đơn	Recipient	

MTV Europe Music Awards

Year	Category	Artist/Nominated work	Result	Note
2014	Best Vietnamese Act	Hồ Ngọc Hà Ngọc Hồ	Won	
2014	Best Southeast Asian Act	Hồ Ngọc Hà Ngọc Hồ	Nominated	

Wechoice Awards

Year	Category	Nominated work/Recipient	Result	Note
2015	Inspirational Playlist	"Em Đi Tìm Anh" (with Noo Phước Thịnh)	Nominated	
2015	Inspirational Playlist	"Destiny"	Nominated	
2016	TV Show Judge of the Year	The Face Vietnam	Nominated	
2017	Favorite Album	Love Songs 2: Cả Một Trời Thương Nhớ (DVD)	Nominated	
2017	Favorite Music Video	"Cả Một Trời Thương Nhớ"	Nominated	
2023	Artist with Notable Activities	Hồ Ngọc Hà Ngọc Hồ	Nominated	

=== Other awards ===
Years	Awards
2000	II Super model Hanoi
2001	I Vietnam Super model
2002	II Asian Model Search
2003	Favorite model, Fashion club
2007	Best Album, Gold Album music awards (for "To tell you")
2008	Best Album, Gold Album music awards (for "When We Love Each Other"); Best style, Mot magazine; Top 3 Best Female Artist, the 2nd HTV Awards (HCMC Television Network)
2009	Top 3 Best Female Artist, the 3rd HTV Awards (HCMC Television Network); Best Female Artist, the 3rd HTV Awards (HCMC Television Network); Friendly Artist, the 3rd HTV Awards (HCMC Television Network); Best style, Mot magazine
2010	Best artist (top 10 finalist), the 1st Zing music awards; Top 10 song of the year, the 1st Zing music awards; Best style, the 1st Zing music awards; Best style, Mot magazine
2011	II Best Activity Generating Brand Volume, Promotion Marketing Award of Asia – PMAA; Best Music Video, the 1st YAN VPOP 20 Awards (YAN TV); Top 10 song of the year, the 2nd Zing music awards; Top 10 music video of the year, the 2nd Zing music awards; Top 10 album of the year, the 2nd Zing music awards
2012	Top 3 Best Female Artist, the 6th HTV Awards (HCMC Television Network); Best Female Artist, the 6th HTV Awards (HCMC Television Network); Best Female Artist, the 2nd YAN VPOP 20 Awards (YAN TV); Artist of the year, Ngoisao.net; Artist of the year, the 3rd Zing music awards; Best music video, the 3rd Zing music awards
2013	Best artist (top 20 finalist), the 3rd YAN VPOP 20 awards (YAN TV); Top 3 Artist of the year, the 4th Zing music awards; Top 10 Best music video, the 4th Zing music awards
2014	Artist of the year, the 5th Zing music awards; Album of the year, the 5th Zing music awards; Artist of the year, thebox.vn; Best artist, YOA (Yan Online Awards)
2015	Best dressed of the night, Elle Style awards Vietnam; Best style female singer of the year, Elle Style awards Vietnam; Best artist (top 20 finalist), the 5th YAN VPOP 20 awards (YAN TV); Contribution Award, the 5th YAN VPOP 20 awards (YAN TV); Best Pop Duo/Group Performance, the 6th Zing music awards; Top music video, the 6th Zing music awards; Top song "Destiny", VIET NAM TOP HITS; Top song "Tội lỗi", VIET NAM TOP HITS; Top song "Em đi tìm anh", VIET NAM TOP HITS; Best Pop Duo/Group Performance, VIET NAM TOP HITS; Top 5 best artist of the year, VIET NAM TOP HITS; Top 5 music project of the year, VIET NAM TOP HITS
2016	Contribution Award, CMG Fitness & Entertainment Award; Artist of the year, the 7th Zing music awards; Album of the year, the 7th Zing music awards; Best artist (top 20 finalist), the 6th YAN VPOP 20 awards (YAN TV)
