= Miss Ideal Nigeria =

- Type: Beauty pageant
- Parent organization: House of Twitch
- Headquarters: Lagos, Nigeria
- First edition: 2014; 12 years ago
- Most recent edition: 2024
- Current titleholder: Nehita Ofure Irieme, Edo State
- Language: English
- Website: Official Website

Miss Ideal Nigeria established in 2014 is a Nigerian beauty pageant organized by the House of Twitch and is aimed at empowering young women across Nigeria. The winners and runners up of Miss Ideal Nigeria automatically represents Nigeria at Miss Global Beauty queen pageant, Miss Tourism World, and Top Model of the World.

The current titleholder is Nehita Ofure Irieme who represented Edo State in the competition.

== Competition ==
After series of virtual screenings and interview, 36 girls are being selected from across Nigeria to compete at the grand finale which is usually held in Lagos, Nigeria.

As at 2023, the winner of Miss Ideal Nigeria automatically earns an opportunity to represent Nigeria in the Top Model of the World competition. The winner also gets prizes from MTN, Golden Penny, Chiplab, Five million naira from Hairlab, 5 million in digital advertising from Motomedia and Five hundred thousand Naira from Motomedia for her petproject. Also, the winner receives free gifts from Diane Zoe, House of Tife, Manell Headquarters, Chief Mrs. Jumoke of Teekay Fashion, and Arch angel designs.

== History ==
Miss Ideal was established in 2014 by Ayotunde Fabamwo, the CEO of House of Twitch. The inaugural titleholder, Princess Adesile, represented Nigeria at the Top Model of Colour 2014 competition in London. In 2016, Nkemneme Queen Amaka became the first contestant from Miss Ideal to represent Nigeria at the Miss Global Beauty Queen pageant in South Korea.

In 2019, the pageant introduced a new format, crowning two winners. Oyin Damola represented Nigeria at Miss Global Beauty, while Sonia Ben-Woko became the Nigeria's first representative at Miss Tourism Worldwide.

Due to the global pandemic in 2020, winner Wendy Abdul was unable to participate in Miss Global Beauty as the event was canceled. In 2021, Miss Ideal acquired the franchise for Top Model of the World, and Wendy Abdul represented Nigeria at the competition.

Some Miss Ideal winners have so far achieved commercial success, with Nkemneme Queen becoming the face of 9mobile, and Precious Adigwe being named the face of MTN.

== Titleholders ==
List of titleholders from inception
Year	Titleholder	State	Ref(s)
2014	Princess Adesile	Miss Ogun	
2015	Sandra Osamor	Miss Lagos	
2016	Nkemneme Queen Amaka	Miss Rivers	
2017	Precious Ekene Adigwe	Miss Lagos	
2018	Stephanie Kingsley	Miss Adamawa	
2019	Oyin Damola	Miss Oyo	
2020	Wendy Abdul	Miss Lagos	
2021	Mary Blac	Miss Oyo	
2022	Wendu Eze	Miss Anambra	
2023	Trustmudje Akpomudje	Miss Edo	
2024	Nehita Ofure Irieme	Miss Edo	
