= Ashley Melendez =

Puerto Rican model and beauty pageant titleholder

- Born: Ashley Melendez Rios; 25 May 1996 (age 30); San Juan, Puerto Rico
- Height: 1.75 m (5 ft 9 in)
- Beauty pageant titleholder
- Title: Miss Water Puerto Rico 2023; Miss Global Puerto Rico 2023; Miss Global 2023
- Hair color: Brown
- Eye color: Brown
- Major competitions: Miss Earth Puerto Rico 2023 (1st Runner-up); Miss Global Puerto Rico 2023 (Winner); Miss Global 2023 (Winner)

Ashley Melendez Rios (born 25 May 1996) is a Puerto Rican model, psychologist and beauty pageant titleholder, She was crowned Miss Global Puerto Rico 2023 and is the first Puerto Rican to be crowned Miss Global 2023 in Cambodia.

== Career ==
=== Miss Earth Puerto Rico 2023 ===
She first participated and won the title of Miss Water Puerto Rico 2023 at Miss Earth Puerto Rico 2023.

=== Miss Global Puerto Rico 2023 ===
She won Miss Global Puerto Rico 2023 and will represent Puerto Rico at Miss Global 2023.

=== Miss Global 2023 ===
She represented the country and became the first Puerto Rican to be crowned Miss Global 2023.

Awards and achievements
Preceded by (Philippines) Marie Sherry Tormes	Miss Global; 2023	Succeeded by (Vietnam) Nguyễn Đình Như Vân
Preceded by Angelia De León	Miss Global Puerto Rico; 2024	Succeeded by Ediris Rivera
