= Julia Pylad =

Swedish fashion model and pageant titleholder

- Born: Norrköping
- Occupations: Model; Pageant titleholder
- Years active: 2019–present
- Modeling information
- Height: 1.83 m (6 ft 0 in)
- Hair color: Brown

Julia Pylad is a Swedish model and pageant titleholder. She won the title of Miss Global Sweden 2019 and is a finalist in Top Model Worldwide 2020 Season 13.

Multiple Swedish newspapers have written articles about her and her journey to become a model and the Miss Global Sweden 2019. She was first recognized in Norrköpings Tidningar and later on in the Swedish newspapers Expressen and Länstidningen as well.
