= Piyaporn Sankosik =

Thai businesswoman

- ปิยาภรณ์ แสนโกศิก
- Occupations: Businessperson; Beauty pageant people
- Known for: Former National director of Miss Universe Thailand; License holder of Miss Thailand; Host committee of Miss Universe 2018
- Board member of: TPN Global; MUT Select

Piyaporn Sankosik (Thai: ปิยาภรณ์ แสนโกศิก) is a Thai businesswoman and beauty pageant identity. She is the managing director of TPN Global, president of Miss Global, Mister Global and licence holder of Miss Thailand.
