= Như Vân =

Vietnamese model and beauty pageant titleholder

Nguyễn Đình Như Vân
- Born: Nguyễn Đình Như Vân; 5 December 1991 (age 34); Đà Lạt, Lâm Đồng, Vietnam
- Height: 1.73 m (5 ft 8 in)
- Children: 2
- Beauty pageant titleholder
- Title: Miss Global Vietnam 2024; Miss Global 2025
- Hair color: Black
- Eye color: Black
- Major competitions: Miss Global Vietnam 2024 (Winner); Miss Global 2025 (Winner)

Nguyễn Đình Như Vân (born 5 December 1991) is a Vietnamese model and beauty pageant titleholder, She was crowned Miss Global Vietnam 2024 and is the first Vietnamese to be crowned Miss Global 2025 in Thailand.

== Career ==
Vân was born in 1991 in Lam Dong. She was previously a photo model and fashion model before entering the beauty industry. She works as a professional model, participating in fashion shows for designers in Ho Chi Minh City.

=== The New Mentor 2023 ===
Vân first participated in a reality show with the competition The New Mentor 2023, she won the title of 1st Runner-up and she is a member of the coach team - Hồ Ngọc Hà.

=== Miss Global Vietnam 2024 ===
Van entered the beauty pageant for the first time and was crowned Miss Global Vietnam 2024 with Miss Global Vietnam 2024 - Kiều Thị Thúy Hằng, who were awarded at the same time on stage.

=== Miss Global 2025 ===
She became the first Vietnamese to win the Miss Global 2025 pageant in Thailand, breaking the previous highest achievement of Đoàn Thu Thủy with the title of 4th Runner-up at Miss Global 2023.This victory is the result of training under the guidance of Director Red Bacon and Coach Jethro Asia Sulayao, focusing on performance skills.

== Personal life ==
In addition to her artistic activities, Van also attracts public attention to her private life. She gave birth to her first child at the age of 18 and became a single mother after her first marriage broke down. In 2013, she married for the second time to an American businessman who already had 3 children. In 2018, the couple welcomed a new member.

In a conversation with the media on February 16, she suddenly confirmed that she was a single mother. She did not reveal details about her relationship with her Western husband, and affirmed that the two had never registered their marriage.

Awards and achievements
Preceded by (Puerto Rico) Ashley Melendez	Miss Global; 2025	Succeeded by (Thailand) Saffron Snook
Preceded by Đoàn Thu Thủy	Miss Global Vietnam; 2024	Succeeded by Trần Huyền Trang
New title	1st Runner Up - The New Mentor; 2023	Succeeded by Incumbent
