= Đoàn Thu Thủy =

Vietnamese model and beauty pageant titleholder

- Born: 15 October 1995 (age 31); Phú Thọ, Vietnam
- Education: Hanoi University
- Height: 1.73 m (5 ft 8 in)
- Beauty pageant titleholder
- Title: Miss Fitness Vietnam 2022; Miss Global Vietnam 2023
- Hair color: Black
- Eye color: Black
- Major competitions: Miss Fitness Vietnam 2022 (Winner); Miss Global 2023 (4th Runner-up)

Đoàn Thu Thủy (born 15 October 1995) is a Vietnamese model and beauty pageant titleholder. She is the first person to be crowned Miss Fitness Vietnam 2022 and achieved 4th Runner-up at Miss Global 2023 held in Cambodia.

== Career ==
=== Vietnam Supermodel 2015 ===
In 2015, Thu Thủy registered for her first contest, Vietnam Supermodel 2015. She won the Impressive Supermodel award. In 2021, she participated in Miss Sports Photogenic 2021 and won the Miss Congeniality sub-award.

=== Miss Fitness Vietnam 2022 ===
She won the Miss Fitness Vietnam contest for the first time in 2022. After winning the crown, She was appointed as the media ambassador for the campaign For a strong and healthy Vietnam.

=== Miss Global 2023 ===
After the title of Miss Fitness Vietnam 2022, she was appointed as Miss Global Vietnam 2023 and will represent Vietnam at Miss Global 2023, she achieved the 4th Runner-up result.

Awards and achievements
Preceded by (Brazil) Natalia Gurgel	4th Runner-up Miss Global; 2023	Succeeded by (Philippines) Xena Ramos
Preceded by Đoàn Thị Hồng Trang	Miss Global Vietnam; 2023	Succeeded by Nguyễn Đình Như Vân
New title	Miss Fitness Vietnam; 2022	Succeeded by Incumbent
