= Miss Global =

International beauty pageant

- Formation: 3 August 2013; 13 years ago
- Headquarters: Bangkok, Thailand
- Official language: English
- Most recent contest: 2026
- President: Piyaporn Sankosik
- Current Titleholder: Saffron Snook; Thailand
- Parent organization: TPN Global Co. Ltd.
- Website: missglobal.com

Miss Global is an international beauty pageant established in 2013. The Miss Global pageant is one of the international pageants that accept single mothers, and age range of candidates is from 18 to 35 years old.

The reigning queen is Saffron Snook from Thailand.

== History ==
Miss Global was first held in 2013 with California in United States as the host city. The first Miss Global was held on August 3, 2013 at the Redondo Beach Performing Arts Center in Redondo Beach, California, United States. This is also the first international contest founded by Vietnamese people, the contest was founded based on Miss Vietnam Global 2006 by Kim Loi Media.

In 2025, the pageant came under the license and leadership of TPN Global, with Piyaporn Sankosik serving as president of the organization.

== Pageants ==
Contest	Date	Final venue	Host country	Entrants	Ref.
2013	3 August	Redondo Beach Performing Arts Centre, Redondo Beach, California	United States	36	
2014	19 December	Crown Princess Cruise, California^{1}	United States	21	
2015	22 October	Newport Performing Arts Theater, Manila	Philippines	44	
2016	24 September	Philippine International Convention Center, Manila	Philippines	40	
2017	17 November	Koh Pich Theatre, Phnom Penh	Cambodia	60	
2018	11 February 2019	Newport Performing Arts Theater, Manila	Philippines	41	
2019	18 January 2020	Guelaguetza Auditorium, Oaxaca	Mexico	55	
2020-2021 Cancelled due to COVID-19 pandemic
2022	11 June	Bali Nusa Dua International Convention Center, Bali	Indonesia	62	
2023	18 January 2024	Bayon TV Steung Meanchey Studio, Phnom Penh^{2}	Cambodia	70	
2024 Contest was not celebrated
2025	9 March	MCC Hall, The Mall Lifestore Ngamwongwan, Nonthaburi^{3}	Thailand	61	
2026	11 October	MCC Hall, The Mall Lifestore Ngamwongwan, Nonthaburi^{3}	Thailand	72	

Notes:
- ^1 The second contest (2014) was held on a Crown Princess cruise ship between Los Angeles, US and Puerto Vallarta, Mexico.
- ^2 The preliminary competition of the ninth contest (2023) was held at Corona Resort & Casino Phú Quốc, Phú Quốc, Kiên Giang, Vietnam.
- ^3 The sashing ceremony and other pre-pageant events of the 10th contest (2025) were held in Cambodia.

== Titleholders ==
Contest	Year	Date	Miss Global	Runners-Up				Location Venue	Entrants
Contest	Year	Date	Miss Global	First	Second	Third	Fourth	Location Venue	Entrants
1st	2013	August 3, 2013	Emily Kiss; Canada	Emilia Ares; Armenia	Joanna Hill; England	Apneet Mann; India	Reine Abahala; Gabon	Los Angeles, California, United States	36
2nd	2014	December 19, 2014	Rasela Mino; Canada	Elise Duncan; Australia	Catherine Almirante; Philippines	Aizhan Lighg; Kazakhstan	Benazir Thaha; Sri Lanka	Los Angeles, California, United States	21
3rd	2015	October 22, 2015	Jessica Peart; Australia	Virginia Prak; Cambodia	Lorna Murphy; Ireland	Gergana Doncheva; Bulgaria	Candice Ramos; Philippines	Manila, Philippines	44
4th	2016	September 24, 2016	Ángela Bonilla; Ecuador	Camille Jensen; Philippines	Caitlynn Henry; Australia	Nikola Bechyňová; Czech Republic	Britt Rekkedal; Norway	Manila, Philippines	40
5th	2017	November 17, 2017	Barbara Vitorelli; Brazil	Tenielle Adderley; The Bahamas	Selina Kriechbaum; Germany	Ayan Said; Somaliland	Lily Wu; China	Phnom Penh, Cambodia	60
6th	2018	February 11, 2019	Sophia Ng; Hong Kong	Amber Bernachi; Canada	Tamila Khodjaeva; Uzbekistan	Seydina Allen; Haiti	Pamela Lee; United States	Manila, Philippines	41
7th	2019	January 18, 2020	Karolína Kokešová; Czech Republic	Hany Portocarrero Novoa; Peru	Adrielle de Castro; Brazil	Riza Santos; Philippines	Mikaela-Rose Fowler; Australia	Oaxaca, Mexico	55
2020			Cancelled due to COVID-19 pandemic						
8th	2021	June 11, 2022	Jessica Da Silva; United Arab Emirates	Not awarded				Bali, Indonesia	62
8th	2022	June 11, 2022	Marie Sherry Ann Tormes; Philippines	Sandra Lim; Malaysia	Brooke Rankin; Australia	Sandra Boris; Lithuania	Natalia Gurgel; Brazil	Bali, Indonesia	62
9th	2023	January 18, 2024	Ashley Melendez; Puerto Rico	Haylani Kuruppu; Samoa	Chonnikarn Supittayaporn; Thailand	Pearl Hung; Philippines	Đoàn Thu Thủy; Vietnam	Phnom Penh, Cambodia	70
2024			No pageant held due to the delay of the 2023 pageant						
10th	2025	March 9, 2025	Nguyễn Đình Như Vân; Vietnam	Keri-Ann Greenwood; Jamaica	Ediris Rivera; Puerto Rico	Lindsay Becker; United States	Xena Ramos; Philippines	Nonthaburi, Thailand	61
11th	2026	October 11, 2026	Saffron Snook; Thailand	Kelly Kirstein; United States	Bianca Caraballo; Puerto Rico	Jayvee Lorejo; Philippines	Kyaw Kyaw Eaindra; Myanmar	Nonthaburi, Thailand	72

=== Continental Queens ===
Year	North America	Latin America	Africa	Europe	Asia-Oceania	Middle East							
Year	North America	Latin America	Africa	Europe	Asia-Oceania	Middle East	2026	Kelly Kirstein; United States	Frannia Ybirmas; Venezuela	Chanel Rautenbach; South Africa	Irene Cabrera; Spain	Jayvee Lorejo; Philippines	Hadis Sattari

=== Country by number of wins ===
Country/Territory	Titles	Year(s)
Canada	2	2013, 2014
Thailand	1	2026
Vietnam	1	2025
Puerto Rico	1	2023
Philippines	1	2022
United Arab Emirates	1	2021
Czech Republic	1	2019
Hong Kong	1	2018
Brazil	1	2017
Ecuador	1	2016
Australia	1	2015

=== Continents by number of wins ===
Continent	Titles	Years
Asia	5	2018, 2021, 2022, 2025, 2026
Americas	5	2013, 2014, 2016, 2017, 2023
Europe	1	2019
Oceania	1	2015
Africa	0	

== Titleholders gallery ==
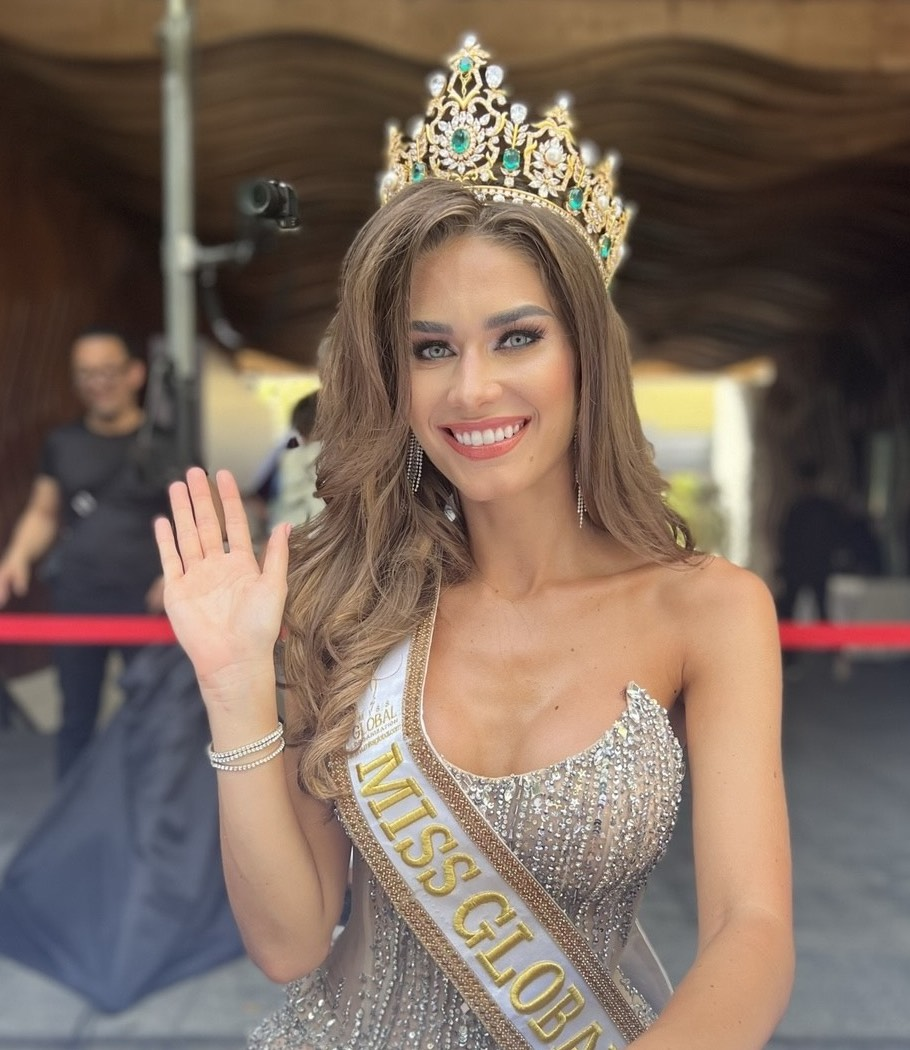
2019 Karolína Kokešová, Czech Republic

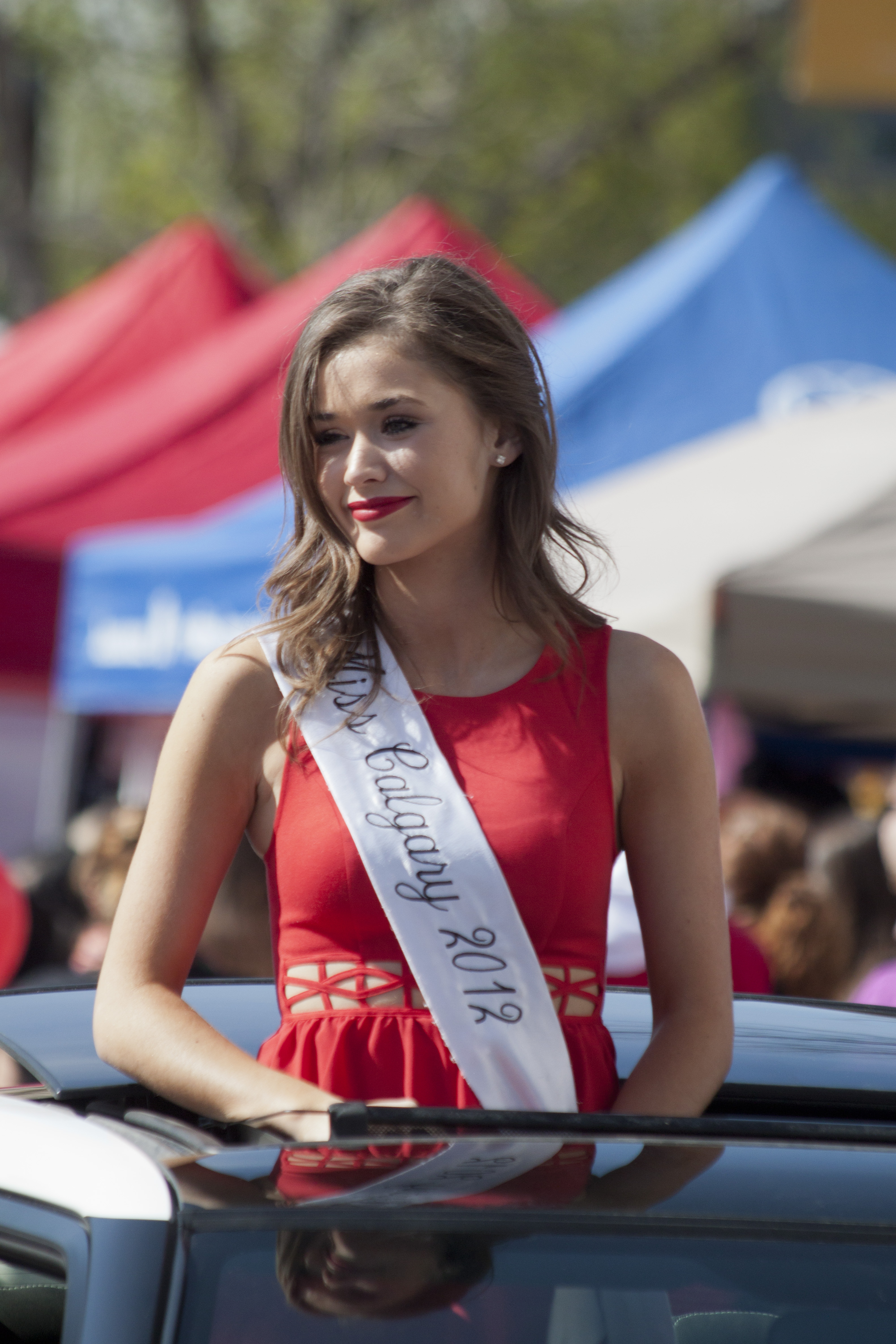
2014 Rasela Mino, Canada

== Miss Global results ==
=== Miss Global 2023 results ===
==== Placements ====
Placement	Contestant
Miss Global 2023	Puerto Rico – Ashley Melendez
1st Runner-Up	American Samoa – Haylani Pearl Kuruppu
2nd Runner-Up	Thailand – Chonnikarn Supittayaporn
3rd Runner-Up	Philippines – Louise Katrina Pearl Hung
4th Runner-Up	Vietnam – Đoàn Thu Thủy
Top 13	Australia – Janaya Reimers; Cambodia – Monyanita Leak; Dominican Republic – Francheska Pujols; Indonesia – Cynthia Ong; Malaysia – Taanusiya Chetty; Somalia – Zainab Jama ∆; South Africa – Simphiwe Ntombela; Sudan – Tasabeh Diab §
Top 20	Brazil – Marcela Araki Yamaguti; Bulgaria – Valeriya Georgieva Dokuzova; Colombia – Dahiana Aguilar; Lithuania – Zlata Kozlova; New Zealand – Jade Parsons; Nigeria – Chinelo Ibegbunam; Spain – Raquel Robles; United States – Danielle Alura; Venezuela – Iriana Pinto
Special Awards	Contestant
Best in National Costume	Philippines – Louise Katrina Pearl Hung
Best Intro Video	Malaysia – Taanusiya Chetty
Miss Fitness	Dominican Republic – Francheska Pujols
Miss Congeniality	Pakistan – Shafina Shah
Miss Goodwill	Brazil – Marcela Araki Yamaguti
Fan Vote Winner	Sudan – Tasabeh Diab
Sisterhood Vote	Somalia – Zainab Jama

§ – Voted into the Top 13 by viewers
∆ – Voted into the Top 13 by the contestants

==== Contestants ====
Country/Territory	Contestant
Afghanistan	Nina Zirai
Australia	Janaya Raimers
Austria	Sophie Else Seyfarth
Bahamas	Kiana Dominique Harris
Bangladesh	Afla Ammran
Belgium	Yuri Bastiaens
Brazil	Marcela Araki Yamaguti
Bulgaria	Valeriya Georgieva Dokuzova
Cambodia	Monyanita Leak
Cameroon	Marie Corinne
Canada	Armita Jalooli
China	Chalsey Nguyen
Colombia	Dahiana Aguilar
Croatia	Nina Benic
Czech Republic	Marie Danči
Dominican Republic	Francheska Pujols
Egypt	Mirna Kiddes
France	Alison Carrasco
Germany	Patricia Serena Rath
Ghana	Regina Ampofowaa Darkwah
Greece	Maria Pappas
Guinea	Aïssatou Dioumo Diallo
Haiti	Nathalie Rigaud
India	Mansi Chourasiya
Indonesia	Cynthia Kurniawan Ong
Iran	Mozghan Rastegar
Italy	Kate Tricia Gatpandan
Jamaica	Celine Waters
Japan	Michiru Yakuwa
Kazakhstan	Zuldhyz Serikbayeva
Kenya	Joy Mutheu
Laos	Vanh Budseng Vongchanthum
Latvia	Dorida Vlasova
Lithuania	Zlata Kozlova
Malaysia	Taanusiya Chetty
Mexico	Maurah Ruiz
Moldova	Irina Batiru Most
Monaco	Cristina Mateias
Myanmar	Akari Hsu
Netherlands	Lonja Van Der Zanden
New Zealand	Jade Parsons
Nigeria	Chinelo Ibegbunam
Norway	Helene Abildsnes
Pakistan	Shafina Syah
Palestine	Ella Mualla
Panama	Marlenis Santamaria Cortes
Philippines	Louise Katrina Pearl Hung
Portugal	Ana Catarina Costa
Puerto Rico	Ashley Melendez
Russia	Polina Kalugina
Samoa	Haylani Pearl Mataupu Kuruppu
Scotland	Jacqueline Crawford
Serbia	Lara Stankovic
Sierra Leone	Adel Caroline Jusu
Singapore	Chloe Hung
Slovenia	Viktoriia Lobanova
Somalia	Zainab Jama
South Africa	Simphiwe Zama Ntombela
South Korea	Robynn Ree
Spain	Raquel Robles
Sudan	Tasabeh Diab
Taiwan	Linda Huang
Thailand	Chonnikarn Supittayaporn
Turkey	Daria Koc
United States	Danielle Alura
Uzbekistan	Darya Masalskaya
Venezuela	Iriana Pinto
Vietnam	Đoàn Thu Thủy
Zimbabwe	Mitchell Kudzai Matizha

=== Miss Global 2022 results ===
==== Placements ====
References for 2022 contest and 2021 contest.

Placement	Contestant
Miss Global 2022	Philippines – Sherry Ann Tormes
Miss Global 2021	United Arab Emirates – Jessica da Silva
1st Runner-Up	Malaysia – Sandra Lim
2nd Runner-Up	Australia – Brooke Rankin
3rd Runner-Up	Lithuania – Sandra Boriseviciute
4th Runner-Up	Brazil – Natalia Gurgel
Top 13	Belgium – Lauralyn Vermeersch; Bosnia and Herzegovina – Natasha Palachkovich §; Haiti – Farah Fourcand ∆; Iceland – Fanney Albertsdòttir; Indonesia – Olivia Tan; Kenya – Eleanor Musangi; Peru – Massiel Suarez
Top 25	Cape Verde – Andrea Almeida; England – Lili Rich; Ghana – Charlee Berbicks; Ireland – Jessica VanGaalen; Italy – Valentina Dettori; Palestine – Lauren Imseeh; Serbia – Katarina Munjic; Tatarstan – Alina Garaeva; United States – Sara Burd; Venezuela – Liz Arbelaez; Vietnam – Đoàn Thị Hồng Trang; Zimbabwe – Tania Aaron
Special Awards	Contestant
Press Favorite	(gold) Malaysia – Sandra Lim; (silver) Indonesia – Olivia Tan; (bronze) Korea - Songyi Kim
Best in National Costume	Indonesia – Olivia Tan
Miss Photogenic	Tatarstan – Alina Garaeva
Miss Fashion	Cambodia - Em Kunthong
Miss Runway	South Africa - Rozelle Bester
Miss Goodwill	Indonesia – Olivia Tan
Miss Fitness	Iceland – Fanney Albertsdòttir
Miss Aesthetics	United Arab Emirates – Jessica da Silva
Miss Popularity	United Arab Emirates – Jessica da Silva
Best in Talent	Philippines – Shane Tormes
Top Model	Kenya - Eleonor Musangi
Fan Vote Winner	Bosnia and Herzegovina - Natasha Palachkovich
Sisterhood Vote	Haiti - Farah Fourcand

§ - Voted into the Top 13 by viewers
∆ - Voted into the Top 13 by contestants

Miss Fitness 2021

Placement	Contestant
Miss Fitness	Iceland – Fanney Albertsdottir
Top 10	Albania – Eugena Lushaj; Angola – Estefania Neves; Ireland – Jessica Vangaalen; Italy – Valentina Dettori; Colombia – Jasenia Orozco; Latvia – Agnese Gasjuna; Lithuania – Sandra Boriseviciute; Serbia – Katarina Munjic; Tatarstan – Alina Zuvarovna

Miss Fashion 2021

Placement	Contestant
Miss Fashion	Cambodia – Jazmine Vitacco
Top 10	South Africa – Rozelle Bester; United States – Maurah Ruiz; Brazil – Natalia Gurgel; Indonesia – Olivia Aten; Ireland – Jessica Vangaalen; Italy – Valentina Dettori; Panama – Monica Lozano Martinez; Tatarstan – Alina Zuvarovna; United Arab Emirates – Jessica Da Silva

Miss Goodwill 2021

Placement	Contestant
Miss Goodwill	Indonesia – Olivia Aten
Top 10	Botswana – Sakshi Bhargava; Brazil – Natalia Gurgel; England – Alina Green; Italy – Valentina Dettori; Colombia – Jasenia Orozco; Nepal – Soenayna Mahangi; (United States) Indigenous peoples of the Americas – Mischaela Elkins; Greece – Niki Theofilopoulou

Miss Photogenic 2021

Placement	Contestant
Miss Photogenic	Tatarstan – Alina Zuvarovna
Top 10	South Africa – Rozelle Bester; United States – Maurah Ruiz; Bahamas – Rickia Smith; Brazil – Natalia Gurgel; Ireland – Jessica Vangaalen; Cambodia – Jazmine Vitacco; Lithuania – Sandra Boriseviciute; Panama – Monica Lozano; United Arab Emirates – Jessica Da Silva

Miss Runway 2021

Placement	Contestant
Miss Runway	South Africa – Rozelle Bester
Top 10	Brazil – Natalia Gurgel; Indonesia – Olivia Aten; Ireland – Jessica Vangaalen; Iceland – Fanney Albertsdottir; France – Aida Kaufman; (United States) Native American – Mischaela Elkins; Tatarstan – Alina Zuvarovna; United Arab Emirates – Jessica Da Silva; Zimbabwe – Tania Aron

==== Contestants ====
Country/Territory	Contestant
Angola	Estefania Neves
Australia	Brooke Rankin
Austria	Sofie Maria Schuh
Azerbaijan	Roya Shirzadloo
Belarus	Maria Hodakovskaya
Belgium	Lauralyn Vermeersch
Benin	Tognizoun Amele Ugette
Bosnia and Herzegovina	Natasha Palachkovich
Brazil	Natalia Gurgel
Bulgaria	Gabriella Valerieva Velikova
Cambodia	Em Kunthong
Cape Verde	Andrea Almeida
China	Yingula Scarlett Sun
Colombia	Jasenia Orozco
England	Lili Rich
Eritrea	Winta Russom
France	Aida Kaufman
Germany	Sarvy Petroudi
Ghana	Charlee Berbicks
Gibraltar	Kayleigh Hollins
Greece	Niki Theofilopoulou
Haiti	Farah Fourcand
Hong Kong	Silvia To
Hungary	Lilla Miklos
Iceland	Fanney Albertsdottir
India	Larissa Dsouza
Indonesia	Olivia Aten
Ireland	Jessica Vangaalen
Italy	Valentina Dettori
Jamaica	Pickqueena Burrell
Japan	Maria Ogawa
Kazakhstan	Anar Omarova
Kenya	Eleanor Musangi Ndambo
Lithuania	Sandra Boriseviciute
Malaysia	Sandra Lim
Mexico	Andrea Medina
Morocco	Khaoula Meftah
Nepal	Soenayna Mahangi
Netherlands	Claudia Brienesse
Nigeria	Stephanie Kingsley
Pakistan	Areej Chaundary
Palestine	Lauren Imseeh
Panama	Monica Lozano Martinez
Peru	Massiel Suarez
Philippines	Shane Tormas
Romania	Ela Apostol
Senegal	Awa Sidibe
Serbia	Katarina Munjic
Singapore	Mandy Tang
South Africa	Rozelle Bester
South Korea	Songyi Kim
Spain	Giselle Villar
Switzerland	Reni Filipova Abadzhieva
Tatarstan	Alina Zuvarovna
Thailand	Ratanna Luangnan
Tunisia	Maha Dakhli
Uganda	Ashlei Watson
United Arab Emirates	Jessica Da Silva
United States	Maurah Ruina
Venezuela	Lis Arbelaez
Vietnam	Đoàn Hồng Trang
Zimbabwe	Tania Aron

=== Miss Global 2019 results ===
==== Placements ====
Ref:

Placement	Contestant
Miss Global 2019 Results	Czech Republic – Karolína Kokesová
1st Runner-Up	Peru – Hany Portocarrero Novoa
2nd Runner-Up	Brazil – Adrielle Pieve de Castro
3rd Runner-Up	Philippines – Riza Santos
4th Runner-Up	Australia – Mikaela-Rose Fowler
Top 12	Croatia – Tiyana Cackovic; Cuba – Yeniffer Marin; Mexico – Palmira Ruiz; Sierra Leone – Christie Fewry; United States – Katherine Peña; Venezuela – Mariangela Marin; Vietnam – Nguyen Thi My Duyên
Top 16	Canada – Angel Bhathal; England – Ashleigh Wild; Indonesia – Tashiana Buller; Latvia – Santa Igaune
Top 25	Bahamas – Jerchovia Moxey; Ecuador – Mayelita Estefania Velarde Fernandez; Haiti – Marlyne Ledoux; Hong Kong – Kumiko Lau; Iraq – Hend Kamel Ajeel; Netherlands – Rowena Waveren; New Zealand – Emily Sullivan; Russia – Veronika Denisova; South Korea – Dojeong Lee

==== Contestants ====
Country/Territory	Contestant
Afghanistan	Madina Jan
Argentina	Melody Jacqueline Rakauskas
Assyria	Shmiran Khoshaba
Australia	Mikaela-Rose Fowler
Bahamas	Jerchovia Moxey
Belgium	Sanne De Weerdt
Brazil	Adrielle Pieve Castro
Cambodia	Jannie Lam
Canada	Angel Bhathal
China	Caroline Ting
Colombia	Jesenia Victoria Orozco
Croatia	Tiyana Cackovic
Cuba	Yeniffer Pileta Marín
Czech Republic	Karolína Kokešová
Dominican Republic	LeslieAnn Padilla
Ecuador	Mayelita Estefanía Velarde Fernández
England	Ashleigh-Jade Wild
Finland	Julia Maruska Pihkanen
Germany	Friederike Neehus
Haiti	Marlyne Ledoux
Hong Kong	Wing Mei Kumiko Lau
Iceland	Guðrún Sigurbjörnsdóttir
India	Mittali Kaur
Indonesia	Tashianna Bhuller
Iraq	Hend Kamel Ajeel
Ireland	Peace Olaniyi
Italy	Hania Nasreddin
Jamaica	Elisha Jolly
Japan	Nina Sandell
Kazakhstan	Unzila Baizhuma
Kyrgyzstan	Sanita Tegiss
Latvia	Santa Igaune
Mexico	Palmira Ariannda Ruiz Vigueras
Nigeria	Esther Jackson
New Zealand	Emily Sullivan
Netherlands	Rowena Van Waveren
Northern Mariana Islands	Kristin Chucci
Pakistan	Yasmeen Jaina
Peru	Hany Portocarrero Novoa
Poland	Gabriela Barnat
Philippines	Riza Raquel Santos
Russia	Veronika Denisova
Serbia	Tanja Grubnic
Sierra Leone	Christie Fewry
Scotland	Freya Taylor
South Korea	Dojeong Lee
Sweden	Julia Pylad
Tatarstan	Anna Tiranova
Trinidad and Tobago	Maya Ramsahoye
Tunisia	Maha Dakhli
United States	Katherine Peña
Venezuela	Mariangela Marín Lugo
Vietnam	Duyen Nguyen
Wales	Emma Davies
Zimbabwe	Tania Tatenda Aaron

=== Miss Global 2018 results ===
==== Placements ====
Ref:

Placement	Contestant
Miss Global 2018	Hong Kong – Sophia Ng
1st Runner-Up	Canada – Amber Bernachi
2nd Runner-Up	Uzbekistan – Tamila Khodjaeva
3rd Runner-Up	Haiti – Seydina Allen
4th Runner-Up	United States – Pamela Lee Urbina
Top 11	Angola – Lauriane Almeda; Australia – Rachel Falzon; Brazil – Juliana Soares da Silva; Cambodia – Soriyan Hang; Ecuador – Dayanna Lucia Mendez; Thailand – Phamolchanok Dhilokratchatasakul
Top 20	Belarus – Hanna Maroz; Bulgaria – Eleonora Stoyanova; Czech Republic – Nikola Uhlířová; Indonesia – Fabienne Nicole Groeneveld; Mexico – Grecia Yazmin Montañez; Mongolia – Uchka Jimsee; Philippines – Mary Eileen Gonzales; South Korea – Rachel Park; Venezuela – Liz Carolina Cabrera
Special Awards	Contestant
Best in Evening Gown	(gold) Indonesia - Fabienne Nicole Groeneveld; (silver) Philippines - Mary Eileen Palencia Gonzales; (bronze) United States - Pamela Lee Urbina
Best in Swimsuit	(gold) United States - Pamela Lee Urbina; (silver) Czech Republic - Nikola Uhlířová; (bronze) Venezuela - Liz Carolina Cabrera Silva
Darling of the Press	(gold) Philippines - Mary Eileen Palencia Gonzales; (silver) United States - Pamela Lee Urbina; (bronze) Uzbekistan - Tamila Khodjaeva
Best Philippine Cultural Wear	(gold) Philippines - Mary Eileen Palencia Gonzales; (silver) Uzbekistan - Tamila Khodjaeva; (bronze) Italy – Samantha Mazocco
Miss Photogenic	Indonesia - Fabienne Nicole Groeneveld
Miss Congeniality	Netherlands - Chaiyenne Huisman
Miss Lady Grace	Czech Republic - Nikola Uhlířová
Awardee	Brazil - Juliana Soares da Silva
Miss Talent	Uzbekistan - Tamila Khodjaeva
Miss Enterprise	South Korea - Rachel Park
Miss Enterprise	Mexico - Grecia Yazmin Montañez Ochoa
Miss Fashion	Laos - Thiihomvong Phoukham
Miss Social Media	Egypt - Dala Elmohands

==== Contestants ====
Country/Territory	Contestant
Aboriginal Australia	Ashanta Tolley
Angola	Lauriane Almeda
Australia	Rachel Falzon
Belarus	Hanna Maroz
Brazil	Juliana Soares da Silva
Bulgaria	Eleonora Stoyanova
Cambodia	Soriyan Hang
Canada	Amber Bernachi
Czech Republic	Nikola Uhlířová
Ecuador	Dayanna Lucía Méndez Espinoza
Egypt	Dala Elmohandes
Ethiopia	Yoza Sium
Finland	Pauliina Pakarinen
Germany	Irina Haller
Ghana	Marigold Frimpong
Haiti	Seydina Allen
Hongkong	Sophia Ng
India	Shalini Audhoe
Indonesia	Fabienne Nicole Groeneveld
Italia	Samantha Mazzocco
Japan	Erea Taira
Laos	Thipphomvong Phoukham
Malaysia	Rheanna Deandra
Morocco	Assala Arrach
Mexico	Grecia Yazmín Montañez Ochoa
Mongolia	Uchka Jimsee
Netherlands	Chaiyenne Huisman
New Zealand	Blayre Forrester
Philippines	Mary Eileen Palencia Gonzales
Réunion	Nayla Layemar
South Korea	Rachel Park
Spain	Natalia Kingue
Syria	Velizara Mahamid
Taiwan	Julianna Liu
Thailand	Phamolchanok Dhilokratchatasakul
Tibet	Tenzin Yonten
Ukraine	María Furdychka
United States	Pamela Lee Urbina
Uzbekistan	Tamila Khodjaeva
Venezuela	Liz Carolina Cabrera Silva
Vietnam	Kiko Chan

=== Miss Global 2017 results ===
==== Placements ====
Ref:

Placement	Contestant
Miss Global 2017	Brazil – Barbara Vitorelli
1st Runner-Up	Bahamas – Tenielle Adderley
2nd Runner-Up	Germany – Selina Kriechbaum
3rd Runner-Up	Somaliland – Ayan Said
4th Runner-Up	China – Lily Wu
Top 11	Australia – Sophia Harris; Cambodia – Paulina Yos; Lebanon – Bianca Eid; Mexico – Karla Isabel Peniche Hernández; Norway – Laura Elizabeth Hubbard; United States – Samantha Joy Hart
Top 20	Colombia – Katherine Vega Triviño; Czech Republic – Zuzana Straková; Philippines – Mary Ann Mungcal; Portugal – Mariana Degener Tomaz; South Africa – Palesa Belinda Tsuai; Suriname – Naomi Imanuel Elizabeth Trotz; Thailand – Sukanya Samut; Tibet – Tenzin Paldon; Vietnam – Vindy Krejcí
Special Awards	Contestant
Best in National Costume	(gold) Chile - Maria Tello Duarte; (silver) Thailand - Sukanya Samut; (bronze) Philippines - Mary Ann Mungcal
Miss Ganzberg	Czech Republic - Zuzana Straková; Cambodia - Paulina Yos; Indonesia – Cynthia Monica Rizkyawati
Miss Photogenic	Vietnam - Vindy Krejcí
Miss Congeniality	Congo - Rebecca Bakhole
Miss Fitness	Lebanon - Bianca Eid
Miss Goodwill	Bulgaria - Elena Burbuchukova
Best in Swimsuit	Thailand - Sukanya Samut
Miss Popularity	Indonesia – Cynthia Monica Rizkyawati
Miss Fashion	Thailand - Sukanya Samut
Miss Talent	Sri Lanka - Roja Santhakumaran

==== Contestants ====
Country/Territory	Contestant
Algeria	Daria Ousseimi
Argentina	Lucila Basso
Australia	Sophia Harris
Azerbaijan	Ayse Merve Ozbay
Bahamas	Tenielle Adderley
Belarus	Natallia Pratasevich
Bosnia and Herzegovina	Lana Bulaggi
Botswana	Aone Ntwayagae
Brazil	Bárbara Juliana de Melo Vitorelli
Bulgaria	Elena Birbuchukova
Cambodia	Paulina Yos
Canada	Emely Bondy
Chile	María Tello Duarte
China	Lily Wu
Colombia	Katherine Vega Triviño
Croatia	Inah Hodge
Czech Republic	Zuzana Straková
Democratic Republic of the Congo	Rebecca Bakhole
Denmark	Louise Badstue
Ecuador	Génesis Stefanía Parra Pico
England	Kate Marie McDonnell
Fiji	Manshika Pooni
Germany	Selina Kriechbaum
Greece	Hera Kruja
Honduras	Ivonne Rodríguez
India	Sanya Soo
Indonesia	Cynthya Monica Rizkyawati
Italy	Silvia Sacchetti
Jamaica	Kiane Ashman-Swaby
Japan	Aya Izaki
Kenya	Ann Paula Machio
Laos	Varissara May Tangsouvanh
Lebanon	Bianca Eid
Libya	Aftiam Ramli
Malaysia	Cass Chen
Malawi	Linda Chisale
Martinique	Nathanaëlle Audel
Mexico	Karla Isabel Peniche Hernández
Moldova	Olga Safonova
Monaco	Sonia Douar
Myanmar	Lang Jaw Hkawn
Nigeria	Anne Osonwanne
Norway	Lauren Elizabeth Hubbard
New Zealand	Johannah Prasad
Poland	Sandra Probucka
Portugal	Mariana Degener Tomaz
Philippines	Mary Ann Garcia Mungcal
Rwanda	Kevina Mbonyinshuti
Russia	Jana Ogladina
Somaliland	Ayan Said
Spain	Carolina Martínez
Sri Lanka	Roja Santhakumaran
Sweden	Lilian Aboud
Suriname	Naomi Imanuel Elizabeth Trotz
South Africa	Palesa Belinda Tswai
Thailand	Sukanya Samut
Tibet	Tenzin Paldon
Ukraine	Viktoria Mikhno
United States	Samantha Joy Hart
Vietnam	Veronika "Vindy" Krejčí

=== Miss Global 2016 results ===
==== Placements ====
Ref:

Placement	Contestant
Miss Global 2016	Ecuador – Ángela Bonilla
1st Runner-Up	Philippines – Camille Hirro Jensen
2nd Runner-Up	Australia – Caitlynn Henry
3rd Runner-Up	Czech Republic – Nikola Bechyňová
4th Runner-Up	Norway – Britt Camillo Rekkedal
Top 10	Canada – Trisha Vergo; China – Helen Zhong; India – Sonam Patel; Kenya – Tima Keilah; Netherlands – Valeriya Vergunova
Top 20	Botswana – Khumo Leburu; Bulgaria – Steliyana Filipova; Cambodia – Dane Ny; Chile – Katherine Saavedra; Iran – Melika Razavi; Nigeria – Faith Obaegbulam; Russia – Marina Shameeva; Sweden – Linnea Johansson; Trinidad and Tobago – Adrianna Edwards; Ukraine – Daryna Ilvoska
Special Awards	Contestant
Best in National Costume	(gold) Philippines - Camille Hirro Jensen; (silver) Australia - Caitlynn Henry; (bronze) Ecuador - Ángela Bonilla
Best in Swimsuit	(gold) Ecuador - Ángela Bonilla; (silver) Philippines - Camille Hirro Jensen; (bronze) Australia - Caitlynn Henry
Best in Long Gown	(gold) Philippines - Camille Hirro Jensen; (silver) Ecuador - Ángela Bonilla; (bronze) United States - Nataliya Baltsevych
Darling of the Press	(gold) Philippines - Camille Hirro Jensen; (silver) Australia - Caitlynn Henry; (bronze) Sweden - Linnea Johansson
Miss Congeniality	Kenya - Tima Keilah
Miss Photogenic	Ecuador - Ángela Bonilla
Miss Nazareth	Sweden - Linnea Johansson
Miss Ageless Beauty	Australia - Caitlynn Henry
Miss Fitness	Iran - Melika Razavi
Miss Enterprise	China - Helen Zhong
Miss Lady Grace	Ecuador - Ángela Bonilla
Miss Talent	Ukraine - Daryna Ilvoska
Miss Fashion	Philippines - Camille Hirro Jensen

==== Contestants ====
Country/Territory	Contestant
Armenia	Maryam Barktloyan
Australia	Caitlyn Henry
Brazil	Mikaela Katrina
Botswana	Khumo Leburu
Bulgaria	Steliyana Filipova
Cambodia	Dane Ny
Canada	Trisha Vergo
Chile	Katherine Saavedra
China	Helen Zhong
Cyprus	Effrosyni Iacovou
Czech Republic	Nikola Bechyňová
England	Courtney Jones
Germany	Anna Lochparidi
Dominican Republic	Stephanie Camacho
Ecuador	Ángela Maritza Bonilla Zapata
France	Tasha Delhomme
Haiti	Weendy Legerme
India	Sonam Patel
Iran	Melika Razavi
Israel	Danielle Bouskilla
Kenya	Tima Keilah
Madagascar	Credella Credle
Myanmar	Su Pwint Oo
Namibia	Ester Haikola
Nigeria	Faith Obaegbulam
Norway	Britt Camillo Rekkedal
Netherlands	Valeriya Vergunova
Philippines	Camille Hirro
Russia	Marina Shameeva
Serbia	Katarina Avramovic
Sri Lanka	Eshania Jayalapa
South Africa	Michelle Trisha Daniels
Sweden	Linnea Johanson
Thailand	Buppha Nilsawat
Tibet	Tenzing Sangnyi
Trinidad and Tobago	Adrianna Edwards
Tunisia	Elhem Ben Aicha
United States	Nataliya Baltsevych
Ukraine	Daryna Ilvoska
Vietnam	Victoria Nguyen

=== Miss Global 2015 results ===
==== Placements ====
Ref:

Final Result	Contestant
Miss Global 2015	Australia - Jessica Peart
1st Runner-Up	Cambodia - Virginia Prak
2nd Runner-Up	Ireland - Lorna Murphy
3rd Runner-Up	Bulgaria - Gergana Doncheva
4th Runner-Up	Philippines - Candice Ramos
Top 11	Colombia - Luisa Fernanda Millan; El Salvador - Angie Durkee; Myanmar - Htet Yee Aungi; South Africa - Zandile Tanda; Taiwan - Jollie Chi; United States - Mariah Coogan
Top 20	Dominican Republic - Saudhi Rodriguez; England - Sophie Rankin; Guyana - Ariella Basdeo; Israel - Bareket Drori; Mexico - Rubí Chaparro; Poland - Karolina Jazwinski; South Korea - Jiyoung Jung; Vietnam - Huynh Thi Yén Nhi; Wales - Rubia Bari
Special Awards	Contestant
Best in Long Gown	(gold) Japan - Megumi Munakata; (silver) Philippines - Candice Ramos; (bronze) Ireland - Lorna Murphy
Best in Swimsuit	(gold) Ireland - Lorna Murphy; (silver) Philippines - Candice Ramos; (bronze) Cambodia - Virginia Prak
Miss Photogenic	South Africa - Zandile Tanda
Miss Fitness	Ireland - Lorna Murphy
Miss Talent	Bulgaria - Gergana Doncheva
Miss Fashion	Myanmar - Htet Yee Aungi
Miss Goodwill	Canada - Eden Boutilier
Ms. Redfox	Philippines - Candice Ramos
Miss Azumi	England - Sophie Rankin
Miss Enterprise	Guyana - Ariella Basdeo
Miss Congeniality	Taiwan - Jollie Chi
Miss New Placenta	Philippines - Candice Ramos

==== Contestants ====
Country/Territory	Contestant
Australia	Jessica Peart
Bulgaria	Gergana Doncheva
Cambodia	Virginia Prak
Canada	Eden Boutilier
China	Ivy Rong Liu
Colombia	Luisa Fernanda Millán
Czech Republic	Zuzana Štěpánová
Denmark	Irina Frost
Dominican Republic	Saudhi Rodríguez
El Salvador	Angie Durke
England	Sophie Rankin
France	Melissa Strugen
Guyana	Ariella Basdeo
India	Ashima Narwal
Ireland	Lorna Murphy
Israel	Bareket Drori
Italy	Madison Pelosi
Japan	Megumi Munakata
Jordan	Katia Zakaria
Malaysia	Amrit Dhillon
Mexico	Rubí Chaparro
Myanmar	Htet Yee Aungi
Nepal	Sunita Pum
Nicaragua	Perla Vásquez
Nigeria	Grace Owonte
Norway	Channa Kauer Sidhu
New Zealand	Suzi Thompson
(United States) Native American	Erynn Ducheneaux
Philippines	Candice Ramos
Poland	Karolina Jazwinski
Portugal	Justus Pacheco
Puerto Rico	Angelia De León
Russia	Eve Roth
Seychelles	Ronda Sidonie
Spain	Miriam Canto
Sri Lanka	Mahadewan Indeewari
South Africa	Zandile Tanda
South Korea	Jiyoung Jung
Taiwan	Jolie Chi
Tibet	Pema Choedon
Turkey	Fulya Sezen
United States	Mariah Coogan
Vietnam	Jane Huynh
Wales	Rubia Bari

=== Miss Global 2014 results ===
==== Placements ====
Ref:

Placement	Contestant
Miss Global 2014	Canada – Ella Mino
1st Runner-Up	Australia – Elise Natalie Duncan
2nd Runner-Up	Philippines – Catherine Almirante
3rd Runner-Up	Kazakhstan – Aizhan Lighl
4th Runner-Up	Sri Lanka – Benazir Thaha
Top 10	California – Fulya Azzghayer; Malaysia – Christina Chelliah; Queensland – Madison O'Neill; Switzerland – Carole Schell; United States – Alli Garcia
Special Award	Contestant
Best in National Costume	Philippines – Catherine Almirante
Best in Evening Gown	Philippines – Catherine Almirante
Miss Fashion	Philippines – Catherine Almirante
Miss Fitness	Australia – Elise Natalie Duncan

==== Contestants ====
Country/Territory	Contestant
California	Fulya Azzghayer
Canada	Ela Mino
Czech Republic	Zuzana Štěpánová
England	Leanne Jade
Iceland	Sara Baldursdottir
India	Vismrity Singh
Italy	Sabrina Hegland
(Jeju Province) Jeju	Eunyoung Huh
Kazakhstan	Aizhan Lighg
(City of London) London	Teresa Goddard
Malaysia	Christina Chelliah
Philippines	Catherine Almirante
Queensland	Madison O'Neill
Sri Lanka	Benazir Thaha
Sweden	Josefine Svensson
Switzerland	Carole Schell
South Korea	Hana Young
United States	Alli García
Victoria	Cassidy Mc Gill
Vietnam	Tram To
Western Australia	Elise Natalie Duncan

=== Miss Global 2013 results ===
==== Placements ====
Ref:

Placement	Contestant
Miss Global 2013	Canada – Emily Kiss
1st Runner-Up	Armenia – Emilia Zoryan
2nd Runner-Up	England – Sophie Rankin
3rd Runner-Up	India – Apneet Mann
4th Runner-Up	Gabon – Reine Abahala
Top 10	Australia – Emily Rogers; Brazil – Naiane Nunes; Dominican Republic – Marilyn Mark; Greece – Sierra Caldwell; United States – Jeniffer Kelly
Top 20	Egypt – Elissa Sarah; Ireland – Shamika Wells; Italy – Natasha Di Flore; Mexico – Cristal Aguirre; Philippines – Charmaine Chiong; Puerto Rico – Willow Garcia; Russia – Natasha Gulina; South Korea – Soojeong Shin; Ukraine – Viktoria Sorokhmanluk; Vietnam – Tran Ngóc Nguyên Khánh
Special Award	Contestant
Miss Fitness	Australia – Emily Rogers
Miss Photogenic	Armenia – Emilia Zoryan
Miss Enterprise	India – Apneet Mann

==== Contestants ====
Country/Territory	Contestant
Alberta	Trisha Vergo
Armenia	Emilia Zoryan
Australia	Elizabeth Rogers
Brazil	Naiane Nunes
California	Maria Manzo
Cambodia	Sola H
Canada	Emily Kiss
Cape Verde	Althea Ramos
Catalunya	Maria Love
China	Trisha Bantigue Lim
Dominican Republic	Marilyn Mark
Dominican Republic in United States	Yanira Pache Cruz
Egypt	Elisa Sarah
Gabon	Reine Abahala
Georgia	Cyveiss Strickland
Greece	Sierra Caldwell
Iceland	Daniela Pandurovic
India	Apneet Mann
Iran	Romisa Morakabi
Ireland	Shamika Bien
Italy	Natasha Di Fiore
London	Joana Hill
Maryland	Tristen Blake
Mexico	Cristal Aguirre
New York	Amanda Agnew
Oregon	Jennifer Kelly
Philippines	Charmaine Chiong
Puerto Rico	Willow Garcia
Russia	Natasha Gulina
Spain	Christina Lee
Sri Lanka	Udara Perera
South Korea	Soojung Shin
Texas	Andrea Smith
Ukraine	Viktoria Sorokhmaniuk
Vieques	Angelina Cavanaugh
Vietnam	Nguyen Khanh Tran

== Controversy ==
In January 2020, Miss Global organizers violated the pageant's rules, and as a result all jury members left the event, and the audience booed the event. Miss Global 2019 technically ended after the sportswear competition, after the top 11 contestants were announced. Next, the president of Miss Global, Van Pham, announced the winner by a single decision, without the presence of the jury. That same evening Miss Global staff advised the contestants to leave the hotel immediately and head to the airport as it was "not safe" anymore. The first Miss Global staff member to react to the show's breach was Geri Doncheva, who resigned in protest against the breach of principle, but the pageant's chief executive, Van Pham, assured the model the withdrawal had nothing to do with the pageant.

== See also ==
- List of beauty pageants
- Miss Global Zimbabwe
