= Miss Global 2025 =

10th Miss Global competition, beauty pageant edition

- Date: March 9, 2025
- Presenters: Anntonia Porsild; Kornkan Sutthikoses
- Venue: MCC Hall, The Mall Lifestore Ngamwongwan, Nonthaburi, Thailand
- Broadcaster: YouTube
- Entrants: 61
- Placements: 21
- Debuts: Bolivia; Guadeloupe; Hmong (Note: Non-national delegate competing as the Hmong people); Liberia; Macau
- Withdrawals: Afghanistan; Austria; Bahamas; Bulgaria; Cameroon; Croatia; Egypt; Greece; Haiti; Laos; Lithuania; Monaco; Myanmar; Norway; Palestine; Panama; Russia; Serbia; Sierra Leone; Slovenia; Somalia; Sudan; Taiwan; Turkey; Uzbekistan; Zimbabwe
- Returns: Azerbaijan; Belarus; Chile; Cuba; Democratic Republic of Congo; Ecuador; Fiji; Hong Kong; Mongolia; Nepal; Netherlands; Poland; Sri Lanka; Sweden; Switzerland; Tunisia; United Arab Emirates
- Winner: Nguyễn Đình Như Vân; Vietnam
- Best National Costume: Sanduni Fernando; Sri Lanka
- Photogenic: Juliana Robles; Ecuador

Miss Global 2025 was the 10th Miss Global pageant, held at the MCC Hall, The Mall Lifestore Ngamwongwan in Nonthaburi, Thailand, on March 9, 2025. This was the first edition held under the ownership of TPN Global.

Nguyễn Đình Như Vân of Vietnam was crowned Miss Global 2025, marking the first victory of the Vietnam in the pageant.

== Background ==
=== Hosting ===
The Miss Global 2025 pageant, marking the 10th edition of the competition, was held from February 23 to March 9, 2025. The edition was co-hosted by Cambodia and Thailand. The organization structured the pageant activities across the two nations, with contestants arriving in Cambodia on February 23, 2025, for the sashing ceremony and initial pre-pageant activities. The delegates subsequently traveled to Thailand for the preliminary competition and the final show.

The coronation night took place on March 9, 2025, at the MCC Hall, The Mall Lifestore Ngamwongwan in Nonthaburi, Thailand. The final event was hosted by Anntonia Porsild and Kornkan Sutthikoses.

=== Selection of participants ===
Contestants from sixty countries and territories were selected to compete in the pageant.

==== Replacements ====
Miss Global Bangladesh 2025, Kazi Tarana, was replaced by Humayra Binte Shahjahan Hridi. Miss Global Spain 2025, Alianara Leon, was replaced by Andrimar Gamboa. Likewise, Miss Global Malaysia 2025, Carol Lynn, was replaced by Eshwinder Kaur. Miss Global Pakistan 2025, Mehwish Butt, was replaced by Anniqa Jamal Iqbal.

==== Debuts, returns, and withdrawals ====
This edition marked the debuts of Bolivia, Guadeloupe, Hmong, Liberia and Macau. Additionally, this edition featured the returns of Chile, Fiji, the Democratic Republic of the Congo and Sri Lanka, which last competed in 2017; Mongolia in 2018; Cuba, Ecuador, Poland and Sweden in 2019; and Azerbaijan, Belarus, the United Arab Emirates, Hong Kong, Nepal, the Netherlands, Switzerland and Tunisia in 2022.

Alina Oleinicenco of Austria, Ariane Ndong Ewane of Cameroon, Sanni Elina Antikainen of Finland, Meriam Gabriel of Morocco, Ariane Vanessa Maciel of Paraguay and Andriana Deket of Ukraine withdrew from the competition.

== Results ==
=== Placements ===
Placement	Contestant
Miss Global 2025	Vietnam – Nguyễn Đình Như Vân
1st Runner-Up	Jamaica – Keri-Ann Greenwood
2nd Runner Up	Puerto Rico – Ediris Rivera
3rd Runner Up	United States – Lindsay Becker
4th Runner Up	Philippines – Xena Ramos
Top 12	Belarus – Darya Hancharevich; Czech Republic – Jana Marvanová §; Ecuador – Juliana Robles; Indonesia – Baby Kristami; Japan – Kiko Uchizono ∆; Switzerland – Jordena Lajci; Venezuela – Andrea Del Val
Top 20	Bolivia – Tamara Salazar; Canada – Kristiyana Yordanova; India – Sweezal Furtado; Malaysia – Eshwin Kaur; Netherlands – Lianne Raukema; Samoa – Nicolina Ah Kuoi; South Korea – Ye-seul Park; Thailand – Pawita Sunthonphong; United Arab Emirates – Douaa Hamdan

§ – Voted into the Top 12 by People's Choice Award
∆ – Voted into the Top 12 by Sisterhood Award

=== Special awards ===
Award	Contestant
Best National Costume	Sri Lanka - Sanduni Fernando
Miss Photogenic	Ecuador - Juliana Robles
Miss Congeniality	Tunisia - Nada Ouji
Best Evening Gown	China - Lizi Qi
People's Choice Award	Czech Republic – Jana Marvanová
Sisterhood Award	Japan – Kiko Uchizono
Best Intro Video	India - Sweezal Furtado

== Contestants ==
61 contestants competed for the title:

Country/Territory	Contestant	Age (Note: Ages at the time of the pageant)	Hometown
Australia	Hannah Swart	27	Perth
Azerbaijan	Deniz Ismiyeva	25	Baku
Bangladesh	Humayra Binte Shahjahan	26	Dhaka
Belarus	Darya Hancharevich	22	Minsk
Belgium	Lore Ven	29	Geel
Bolivia	Tamara Salazar	25	Bermejo
Brazil	Anna Martins	33	Joinville
Cambodia	Sreykhouch Khon	20	Ratanakiri
Canada	Kristiyana Yordanova	23	Winnipeg
Chile	Monica de Caro	34	Santiago
China	Lizi Qi	25	Guangzhou
Colombia	Maria Naranjo	29	Montería
Cuba	Freddra Reyes	23	Miami
Czech Republic	Jana Marvanová	28	Ústí nad Labem
Democratic Republic of the Congo	Aliyanna Kutho	18	Kinshasa
Dominican Republic	Mariell Marlene García	25	Santo Domingo
Ecuador	Juliana Robles	21	Machala
Fiji	Nadine Roberts	30	Sydney
France	Maëva Balan	27	Paris
Germany	Mona Schafnitzl	24	Mindelheim
Ghana	Adelaide Somuah Twum	23	Accra
Guadeloupe	Annaelle Ibo	24	Paris
Hmong	Nikki Nsta Iab Lee	32	Clovis
Hong Kong	Chen Shi Man	26	Hong Kong
India	Sweezal Furtado	20	Barkur
Indonesia	Baby Kristami	25	Medan
Iran	Helia Jalilnezhad	25	Tabriz
Italy	Dora Alejandra Celestino	29	Rome
Jamaica	Keri-Ann Greenwood	23	Kingston
Japan	Kiko Uchizono	25	Kagoshima
Kazakhstan	Lyubov Fedorova	34	Yakutsk
Kenya	Margaret Ayieko Arego	26	Nairobi
Liberia	Kindness Wilson	26	Monrovia
Macau	Tang Xinyue	23	Nossa Senhora de Fátima
Malaysia	Eshwin Kaur	24	Ipoh
Mexico	Sol Gutiérrez	26	Ensenada
Moldova	Nicolina Harea Martinov	23	Chișinău
Mongolia	Aminaa Norjmaa	20	Ulaanbaatar
Nepal	Bidhi Lamsal	22	Kathmandu
Netherlands	Lianne Raukema	21	Emmen
New Zealand	Courtney Pierce	21	New Plymouth
Nigeria	Evangel Obianuju	26	Enugu
Pakistan	Anniqa Jamal Iqbal	23	Karachi
Philippines	Xena Ramos	25	Pasig
Poland	Izabela Wróblewska	26	Olsztyn
Portugal	Daniela Marques	28	Torres Vedras
Puerto Rico	Ediris Rivera	29	Carolina
Samoa	Nicolina Ah Kuoi	24	Sapapali'i
Singapore	Christina Cai Meiqi	25	Singapore
South Africa	Zelda Mutshotsho	21	Thohoyandou
South Korea	Ye-seul Park	25	Seoul
Spain	Andrimar Gamboa	29	Ciudad Guayana
Sri Lanka	Sanduni Fernando	24	Negombo
Sweden	Petra Lind	23	Skellefteå
Switzerland	Jordena Lajci	23	Zurich
Thailand	Pawita Sunthonphong	24	Bangkok
Tunisia	Nada Ouji	29	Tunis
United Arab Emirates	Douaa Hamdan	27	Gaza City
United States	Lindsay Becker	34	Burnsville
Venezuela	Andrea Del Val	28	Barquisimeto
Vietnam	Nguyễn Đình Như Vân	34	Da Lat
