= Miss Earth Puerto Rico 2023 =

19th edition of Miss Earth Puerto Rico pageant

Miss Earth Puerto Rico
- Date: January 29, 2023
- Venue: San Juan, Puerto Rico
- Entrants: 28
- Placements: 12
- Winner: Victoria Arocho; Caguas

Miss Earth Puerto Rico 2023 was the 19th Miss Earth Puerto Rico pageant, held in San Juan, Puerto Rico, on January 29, 2023.

Paulina Avilés-Feshold of Carolina crowned Victoria Arocho of Caguas as her successor at the end of the event. She represented Puerto Rico at Miss Earth 2023 in Vietnam and placed in the Top 12.

== Results ==
=== Placements ===
Placement	Contestant
Miss Earth Puerto Rico 2023	Caguas – Victoria Arocho
Miss Air Puerto Rico 2023	Rincón – Nashaly Muñiz
Miss Water Puerto Rico 2023	Fajardo – Ashley Meléndez
Miss Fire Puerto Rico 2023	Cayey – Jaimar Cruz
Top 6	Camuy – Lizmarie Rodríguez; Guaynabo – Monika Zayas
Top 12	Bayamón – María Amador; Isabela – Andrea Arteaga; Loíza – Alondra Martínez; Manatí – Monique Alarcón; Ponce – Cynthia Goenaga; Villalba – Jovanska Santiago

== Contestants ==
28 contestants will compete for the title:

Municipality	Contestant
Aguada	Keyshali Orama
Aibonito	Emira Dominguez
Arecibo	Adriana Mercado
Bayamón	María Amador
Caguas	Victoria Arocho
Camuy	Lizmarie Rodríguez
Canóvanas	Paola Torres
Carolina	Aimee Candelaria
Cayey	Jaimar Cruz
Dorado	Valerie Classseb
Fajardo	Ashley Meléndez
Guaynabo	Monika Zayas
Isabela	Andrea Arteaga
Juncos	Julianit Nazario
Lajas	Amanda Ayala
Loíza	Alondra Martínez
Manatí	Monique Alarcón
Mayagüez	Andrea Ayala
Morovis	Shakira Maldonado
Ponce	Cynthia Goenaga
Rincón	Nashaly Muñiz
San Juan	Nicole González
San Lorenzo	Haydie Fayette
San Sebastián	Caroline Velazquez
Toa Alta	Marielys García
Utuado	Michaela Díaz
Villalba	Jovanska Santiago
Yauco	Paola Morales
