= Mariah Coogan =

American model and equestrian (1994–2018)

- Born: Mariah Sunshine Coogan; August 24, 1994; Santa Rosa, California, U.S.
- Died: April 9, 2018 (aged 23); Scottsdale, Arizona, U.S.
- Occupation: Model

Mariah Sunshine Coogan (August 24, 1994 – April 9, 2018) was an American model and equestrian from Sonoma County, California. She pursued a professional modeling career in Southern California and was also active on Instagram. Coogan died at the age of 23 in an aviation accident in Scottsdale, Arizona, along with five other people.

== Early life and equestrian activities ==
Coogan grew up in Forestville, California, and attended Cardinal Newman High School in Santa Rosa. She developed an interest in horseback riding during childhood and participated in competitive equestrian events.

In February 2008, the United States Eventing Association published an article written by Coogan about her participation in a cross-country equestrian competition. At the time, she was competing in beginner novice eventing with her horse, Dancin' With Dynamite.

Following a fall from a horse, Coogan reduced her involvement in competitive riding and concentrated on modeling, an activity she had previously pursued alongside equestrian sports.

== Modeling career ==
Coogan left high school during her junior year to pursue a career in modeling. She subsequently relocated to San Diego and later to the Los Angeles area.

She worked with the San Diego-based talent agency Scott Copeland International. Its founder, Scott Copeland, stated in an interview with KGTV that he had worked with her for more than four years. Coogan also appeared on the cover of Ranch & Coast magazine.

According to KTVU, she was working with three modeling agencies in Los Angeles. She also maintained an Instagram account featuring modeling photographs and travel-related content, which had approximately 27,000 followers in April 2018.

== Death ==
On April 9, 2018, Coogan was among six people aboard a Piper PA-24 Comanche that crashed shortly after departing Scottsdale Airport in Arizona. The aircraft was traveling to North Las Vegas Airport in Nevada when it struck the ground near the TPC Scottsdale golf course. All six occupants were killed.

The National Transportation Safety Board determined that the probable cause of the accident was the flight instructor's failure to maintain control during the initial climb, primarily because the aircraft exceeded its maximum authorized weight and aft center-of-gravity limits. Reduced engine power caused by a pre-existing mechanical defect was identified as a contributing factor.

Coogan's family subsequently filed a lawsuit in connection with the accident in April 2019.
