= Miss Universe Indonesia 2023 =

1st edition of the Miss Universe Indonesia competition

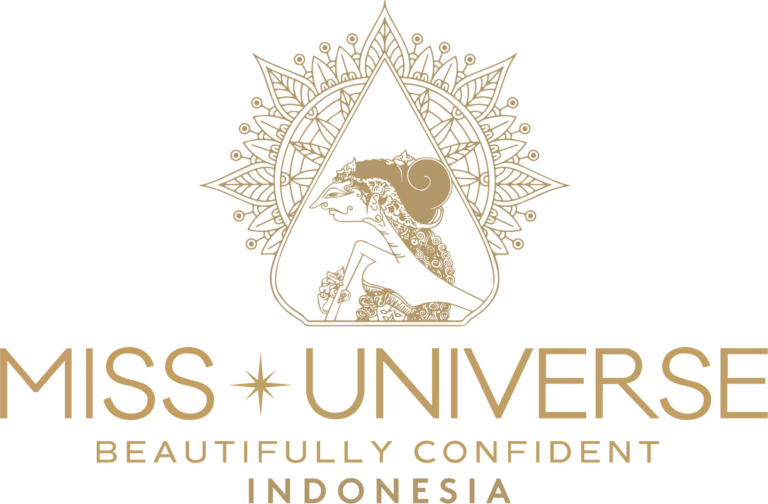
- Date: 3 August 2023
- Presenters: Rory Asyari; Eveline Ong; Okky Alparessi
- Entertainment: Fabio Asher; Bunga Citra Lestari
- Theme: Women Empowerment
- Venue: Beach City International Stadium, Jakarta
- Broadcaster: NET
- Entrants: 30
- Placements: 15
- Winner: Fabiënne Groeneveld; Jakarta SCR

Miss Universe Indonesia 2023 was the 1st Miss Universe Indonesia pageant, held at the Beach City International Stadium in Jakarta, Indonesia, on 3 August 2023.

Fabiënne Nicole Groeneveld of Jakarta SCR was crowned at the end of the event. She represented Indonesia at the Miss Universe 2023 pageant in El Salvador.

== Background ==
=== New Franchise ===
The new Miss Universe Indonesia franchise was awarded to Poppy Capella, national director. Capella is an Indonesian actress, singer and businesswoman with business in shipping, commodities, structured sinancing, fund raising, aviation and the trading sectors. It was the first time in the franchise that contestants were allowed to use English, rather than Bahasa Indonesia.

=== Opening ceremony ===
On 8 February 2023, this Miss Universe Indonesia organization was formed and launched. The license is owned by Capella, who is also the national director, under a limited liability company Capella Swastika Karya and Just Capella Sdn. Bhd. management. The press launch was attended by the Miss Universe 2022 R'Bonney Gabriel, second runner-up and top five of Miss Universe 2022, Andreína Martínez and Gabriëla Dos Santos, respectively.

=== Selection of Participants ===
From this edition onwards, the organization will officially accept married women and women with children to compete in the pageant, within the age requirement of 18–28 years.

=== New Crown Launch ===
On Monday, 29 May 2023 the organization launched its inaugural crown, The Shimmering Hope Crown at La Moda, Plaza Indonesia, Jakarta. The crown is made by UBS Gold of Indonesia.

== Results ==
=== Placements ===
Placement	Contestant
Miss Universe Indonesia 2024	Jakarta – Fabiënne Groeneveld
1st Runner-Up	North Sumatra – Vina Sitorus
2nd Runner-Up	West Java – Muthia Rachman
3rd Runner-Up	Riau Islands – Angela Lillo
4th Runner-Up	Jakarta – Baby Kristami
Top 11	Bali – Lola Larasati; Jakarta – Alya Zahira; Jakarta – Jezneel Ross §; Riau Islands – Stella Vidyasari; Maluku – Grace Bersyeba; North Sumatra – Grecia Hutapea
Top 15	Yogyakarta – Shania Maheer; Gorontalo – Vensca Tanus; West Java – Ratih Widhiarta; South Kalimantan – Sheren Simamora

§ – Entered the Top 11 as Fanvote winner

== Delegates ==
30 delegates competed for the title.

Sash	Delegates	Age (Note: Ages at the time of the pageant)	Height	Hometown
ALYA	Alya Zahira	22	170 cm (5 ft 7 in)	Jakarta SCR
ANGELA	Angela Yovita Lilo	24	172 cm (5 ft 7 1/2 in)	Riau Islands
BABY	Baby Kristami Coriesza Nauli	26	170 cm (5 ft 7 in)	Jakarta SCR
CHELSEA	Putu Chelsea Ivana Maida	19	170 cm (5 ft 7 in)	Bali
DINDA	Dinda Alifah Ayudita	26	171 cm (5 ft 7 1/2 in)	South Sumatra
EUGENIA	Eugenia Liviana Irwan	22	168 cm (5 ft 6 in)	East Java
FABIENNE	Fabienne Nicole Groeneveld	23	158 cm (5 ft 2 in)	Jakarta SCR
FAYZA	Fayza Fahria Khaldani	21	170 cm (5 ft 7 in)	Banten
GRACE	Grace Bersyeba Martina Haba	25	168 cm (5 ft 6 in)	Maluku
GRECIA	Novia Irma Grecia Hutapea	27	175 cm (5 ft 9 in)	West Sumatra
ILMA	Ilma Fitriana	27	175 cm (5 ft 9 in)	Central Java
JEZNEEL	Jezneel Ross	26	168 cm (5 ft 6 in)	Jakarta SCR
LOLA	Lola Nadya Larasati	25	170 cm (5 ft 7 in)	Bali
MARSYA	Marsya Rarentewan	27	170 cm (5 ft 7 in)	North Sulawesi
MUTHIA	Muthia Fatika Rachman	21	175 cm (5 ft 9 in)	West Java
NATASHA	Ni Kadek Natasha Lilian Ari Rudana	23	170 cm (5 ft 7 in)	Bali
NATKENI	Natasha Keniraras	25	169 cm (5 ft 6 1/2 in)	East Java
PRISKILA	Priskilla Jelita Tamariska	23	168 cm (5 ft 6 in)	West Java
PUTRI	Puput Putri Utami	23	168 cm (5 ft 6 in)	Jakarta SCR
RATIH	Desak Putu Ratih Widhiarta	20	170 cm (5 ft 7 in)	West Java
ROSA	Rosalina Permata Mulya	27	169 cm (5 ft 6 1/2 in)	South Kalimantan
RUTH	Ruth Hillary Siagian	26	169 cm (5 ft 6 1/2 in)	North Sumatra
SHANIA	Shania Binti Mahir Hamdun	24	176 cm (5 ft 9 1/2 in)	Yogyakarta SR
SHEREN	Wirda Sheren Regina Simamora	24	175 cm (5 ft 9 in)	South Kalimantan
SHERLY	Catherina Sherly Meliana Hananto	23	173 cm (5 ft 8 in)	East Java
STELLA	Stella Vidyasari	22	168 cm (5 ft 6 in)	Riau Islands
VANIA	Vania Valencia	22	170 cm (5 ft 7 in)	Yogyakarta SR
VENSCA	Vensca Veronica Tanus	27	170 cm (5 ft 7 in)	Gorontalo
VINA	Vina Anggi Sitorus	24	170 cm (5 ft 7 in)	North Sumatra
WIDI	Widi Asih Utami	19	168 cm (5 ft 6 in)	Central Sulawesi

== Controversy ==
=== Sexual harassment ===
In August 2023, three out of the eleven finalists filed police reports regarding incidents of sexual harassment they experienced during body checking. One of the finalists alleged that she was instructed to remove her clothes, including her bra, in a confined room. She expressed her shock at the presence of males in the room and how the cramped space made her uncomfortable. When she tried to cover her breasts, she was reprimanded. Furthermore, she alleged that she was coerced into posing for multiple poses and was made to open her legs while standing. She also reported unwanted touching of her private areas during the body checks. Another contestant also came forward, alleging that she was photographed without her consent while not wearing any clothing. It is also alleged that the organizers were trying to silence the victims. As a result, the Miss Universe Organization terminated their franchise contract with Poppy Capella as the Miss Universe license owner.

=== Requirement of height ===
Indonesian social media raised concerns over winner Nicole's height, citing it as a reason she should not have won. The event guidelines specified a minimum height requirement of 168cm for contestants, which Nicole did not meet. Four days after her win, the organizers removed the height requirement, stating that disqualifying her based on her height had been deemed unfair.
