= Fabiënne Groeneveld =

Indonesian-Dutch beauty pageant titleholder

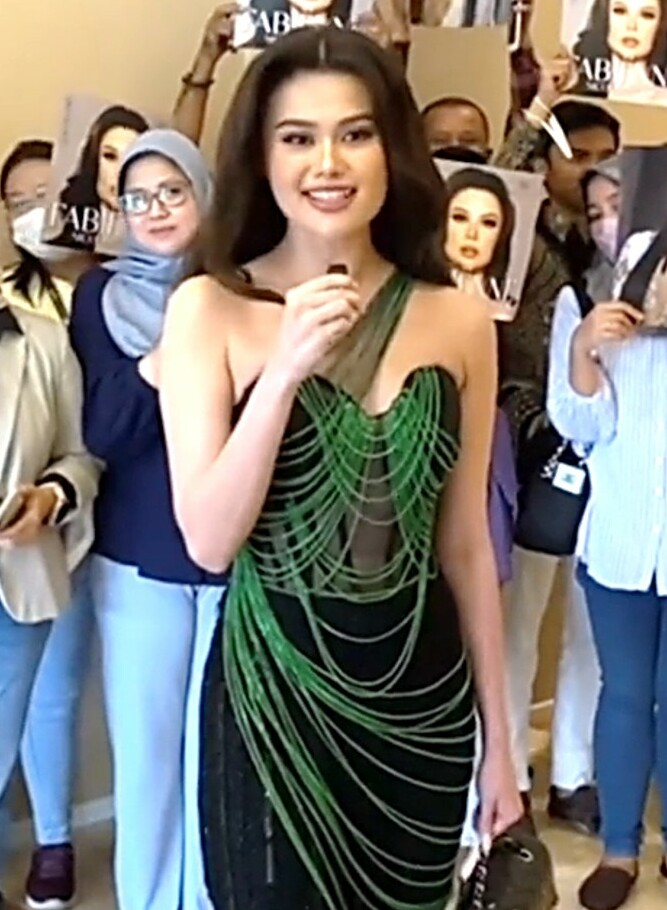
- Groeneveld in 2023
- Born: Fabiënne Nicole Groeneveld; 27 December 1999 (age 26); Spijkenisse, South Holland, Netherlands
- Education: Pelita Harapan University (B.IBM); University of New South Wales (MBA); Australian Graduate School of Management (Professional certification)
- Occupations: Beauty pageant titleholder; businesswoman
- Height: 1.58 m (5 ft 2 in)
- Parents: Sven Groeneveld (father); Natalia Cecilia Tanudjaja (mother)
- Beauty pageant titleholder
- Title: Miss Global Indonesia 2018; Miss Universe Indonesia 2023
- Hair color: Dark Brown
- Eye color: Dark Brown
- Major competitions: Miss Global Indonesia 2018; (Winner); Miss Global 2018; (Top 20); Miss Universe Indonesia 2023; (Winner); Miss Universe 2023; (Unplaced)

Signature
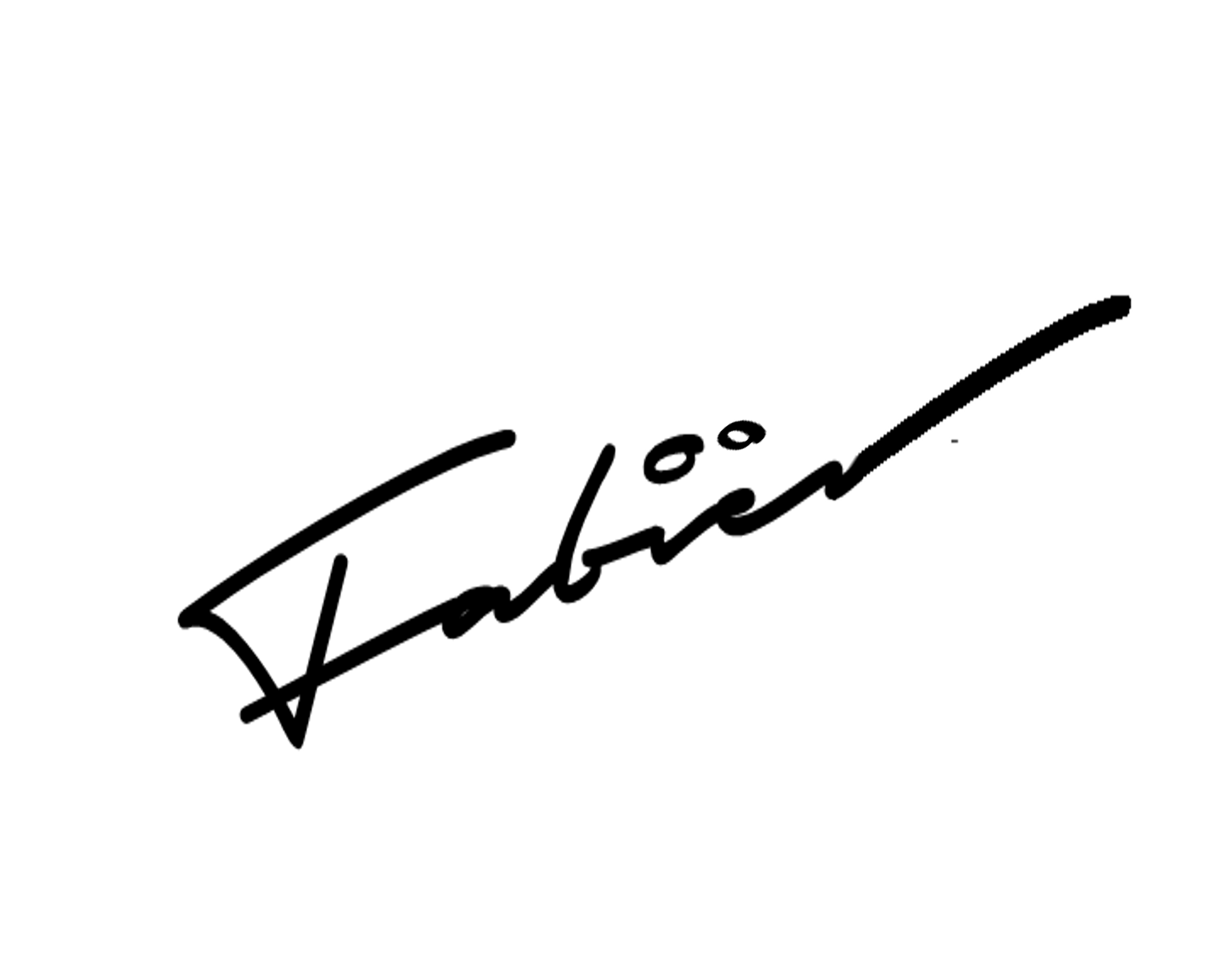

Fabiënne Nicole Groeneveld (Dutch pronunciation: [faːbiˈjɛn(ə) niˈkɔl ˈɣrunəvɛlt]; born 27 December 1999) is an Indonesian-Dutch beauty pageant titleholder who was crowned Miss Universe Indonesia 2023. She represented Indonesia at the Miss Universe 2023 competition in San Salvador.

Groeneveld previously won Miss Global Indonesia 2018 and competed at Miss Global 2018 pageant in Manila, Philippines where she finished in the top 20.

== Early life and education ==
Fabiënne Nicole Groeneveld was born on 27 December 1999, in Spijkenisse, South Holland in Netherlands, to a Chinese-Indonesian politician and businesswoman, Natalia Cecilia Tanudjaja.

Groeneveld was born and raised in Spijkenisse and The Hague in the province of South Holland, where she spent her childhood time before the family moved to her mother hometown in Surabaya, East Java - Indonesia in 2010, Groeneveld is a polyglot, she fluently speaks Indonesian, Dutch and English.

Groeneveld attended Pelita Harapan University in Surabaya and graduated in 2017, with a Bachelor of International Business Management (B.IBM). In 2019, she completed her Master of Business Administration (MBA) from the University of New South Wales in Sydney, and she also completed her Professional certification in Business Administration and Management essentials from the Australian Graduate School of Management (AGSM) in 2021.

== Pageantry ==
=== Miss Global Indonesia 2018 ===
On 15 September 2018, Groeneveld won Miss Global Indonesia 2018 at the Jakarta Convention Centre, Jakarta, Indonesia. The finals night comprised competitions in swimwear, evening gown, and two question and answer rounds. She Groeneveld competed against thirty-nine other delegates, and was crowned by outgoing Miss Global Indonesia 2017 Cynthya Monica Rizkyawati.

=== Miss Global 2018 ===
As Miss Global Indonesia 2018, Groeneveld represented Indonesia Miss Global 2018 in Newport World Resorts, Manila, The Philippines on 11 February 2019. During the preliminaries, Groeneveld won two special awards, Best in Evening Gown and 'Miss Photogenic.

=== Miss Universe Indonesia 2023 ===
Groeneveld won Miss Universe Indonesia 2023 at the Beach City International Stadium, Jakarta, Indonesia, on 3 August 2023, competing against other 29 delegates. Sshe was crowned by the reigning Miss Universe 2022 R'Bonney Gabriel from the US. Groeneveld was crowned with the new Miss Universe Indonesia crown named The Shimmering Hope.

During the final top three, Groeneveld was asked by the Miss Universe organization representative Shameera Shah whether she has any important lesson for us to takeaway from technology that impacted Indonesia's young generation. She answered:

Those who are so far can feel so close, and those so close can feel so far, technology really helps us in communication. However it is our responsibility on how we utilize that, I believe technology can be a force for good, we can empower, we can inspire and we can connect those from far away, because I believe with the power of technology and what is in our hearts, that we as a human at the end of the day all connects with hearts. Thank You.

==== Background ====
In January 2023, she competed for the title of Miss Universe Indonesia 2023 under a new organization headed by Datin Wira Poppy Capella Swastika, through an open audition in Jakarta, where she gained the right to represent Jakarta SCR at Miss Universe Indonesia 2023. During the preliminary events, Groeneveld won the Miss Confidently Beautiful special award.

==== Controversy ====
On 8 August 2023, three out of the thirty finalists filed police reports regarding incidents of sexual harassment they experienced during body checking in pageant quarantine days. This allegation was then taken to legal action, and handled directly by the Ministry of Women Empowerment and Child Protection, where the government prohibited Groeneveld from representing Indonesia at Miss Universe 2023 until the case was legally resolved. The Miss Universe organization later gave permission for Groeneveld to take part in Miss Universe 2023. In an Interview with Republika, Groeneveld stated that she had not experienced any kind of sexual harassment at the event, and said, I do not support any form of harassment or violence against women, for me beauty pageants are a platform that is used to raise the dignity of a woman. Similar statements later emerged from 26 other contestants who felt that they had not experienced any sexual harassment during the pageant.

On 12 August 2023, the Miss Universe Organization officially terminated their franchise contract with PT. Capella Swastika Karya which held the contest, after the sexual harassment complaints.

=== Miss Universe 2023 ===
As the winner of Miss Universe Indonesia 2023, Groeneveld represented Indonesia at Miss Universe 2023. which was held at Gimnasio Nacional José Adolfo Pineda, San Salvador, El Salvador on 18 November 2023, where she was unplaced.

== Advocacy and Platform ==
Groeneveld has been an advocate for women's empowerment, providing support for victims of domestic violence through her organization Empower Now, founded in 2019. Groeneveld's organization works with the Ministry of Women Empowerment and Child Protection to bring attention to the needs of individuals who are facing on domestic violence and their families, and improving access to intervention facilities, therapies and services, especially for those in rural areas. The organisation has created sex education programs that include online education, a national program for primary prevention action plan that encourages Indonesian boys and men to be activate in the issue of ending men's violence against women.

The organisation also supports Fight Hunger, aiming to end hunger and malnutrition in rural communities.

Awards and achievements
Preceded by Laksmi Shari De-Neefe Suardana, Bali	Miss Universe Indonesia; 2023	Succeeded by Clara Shafira Krebs, Banten
