= Miss Universe Indonesia 2025 =

3rd edition of the Miss Universe Indonesia competition

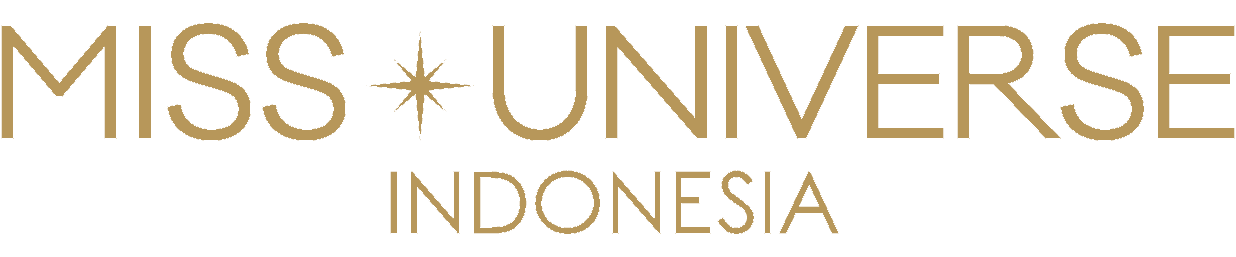
- Date: 22 September 2025
- Presenters: Ibnu Jamil; Eveline Ong
- Entertainment: Kallula; Bam Mastro; Nanang Hape
- Theme: Indonesian by Heart, Rising to the Universe
- Venue: Opus Grand Ballroom, The Tribrata, Jakarta, Indonesia
- Entrants: 16
- Placements: 6
- Winner: Sanly Liu; Bali

Miss Universe Indonesia 2025 was the 3rd Miss Universe Indonesia pageant, held on 22 September 2025 at the Opus Grand Ballroom, The Tribrata, Jakarta, Indonesia. This will be the first edition under the directorship of Kelly Tandiono, who took over the position from Teuku Jordan Zacky.

Clara Shafira Krebs of Banten crowned Sanly Liu of Bali as her successor at the end of the event. She will represent Indonesia at Miss Universe 2025 in Thailand.

== Results ==
=== Placements ===
Placement	Contestant
Miss Universe Indonesia 2025	Bali — Sanly Liu
1st Runner-Up	Riau — Rita Nurmaliza Alizar
2nd Runner-Up	Jakarta — Kirana Larasati Hanafiah
Top 6	Aceh — Khaura Tsabitha Baraba; Central Java — Merry Anne Putri Djwantoro; Jakarta — Chanceline Wenny Nanafride

=== Special awards ===
Award	Contestant
Miss Elegance by NJS Gold	Central Java — Merry Anne Putri Djwantoro
Fan Favorite by Zetrix	Bali — Sanly Liu

== Pageant ==
=== Selection committee ===
- Kelly Tandiono – Model and Miss Universe Indonesia national director
- Naomi Julia Soegianto – Founder and CEO of NJS Gold
- Chitra Subyakto – Founder and creative director of Sejauh Mata Memandang
- Andandika Surasetja – Creative director of Jakarta Fashion Week
- Agni Pratistha – Actress, editor and Puteri Indonesia 2006 from Central Java
- Andini Effendi – Journalist and documentarist
- Adita Irawati – Communication practitioner and member of Plan Indonesia's board of supervisors

== Delegates ==
The official 16 finalists were announced on 20 August.

Delegate	Age	Height	Province
Chanceline Wenny Nanafride	23	1.75 m (5 ft 9 in)	Jakarta SCR
Felitsa Andreca Andryanto	22	1.66 m (5 ft 5 1/2 in)	West Java
Gabriella Cecilia	25	1.70 m (5 ft 7 in)	Jakarta SCR
Geraldine Nadya Talumewo	27	1.65 m (5 ft 5 in)	South Sulawesi
Khaura Tsabitha Baraba	23	1.67 m (5 ft 5 1/2 in)	Aceh
Kirana Larasati Hanafiah	38	1.67 m (5 ft 5 1/2 in)	Jakarta SCR
Merry Anne Puteri Djwantoro	24	1.71 m (5 ft 7 1/2 in)	Central Java
Nastika Aprilia	34	1.72 m (5 ft 7 1/2 in)	Southeast Sulawesi
Nayla Adiva Nurrisqa	23	1.67 m (5 ft 5 1/2 in)	Banten
Odelia Catalina Tan	28	1.67 m (5 ft 5 1/2 in)	Jakarta SCR
Putu Jessica Alexandra Chang	27	1.65 m (5 ft 5 in)	Bali
Rhany Nur Chasanah	29	1.69 m (5 ft 6 1/2 in)	Jakarta SCR
Rita Nurmaliza Alizar	29	1.67 m (5 ft 5 1/2 in)	Riau
Sanly Liu	29	1.70 m (5 ft 7 in)	Bali
Tara Liora Madison	23	1.70 m (5 ft 7 in)	South Sumatera
Valencia Angel	27	1.73 m (5 ft 8 in)	West Java

=== Top 29 ===
The Top 29 semifinalists were announced on 6 August. The following delegates did not advance to the top sixteen.

Delegate	Age	Height	Province
Adelheid Adelia	38	1.71 m (5 ft 7 1/2 in)	East Java
Afina Syifa Biladina	25	1.65 m (5 ft 5 in)	Jakarta SCR
Alodia Lyn	28	1.65 m (5 ft 5 in)	Yogyakarta SR
Aprilia Darmin	28	1.75 m (5 ft 9 in)	Jakarta SCR
Elvina Kho	31	1.67 m (5 ft 5 1/2 in)	Central Java
Karisma Uziana Kaluku	34	1.77 m (5 ft 9 1/2 in)	West Java
Lala Darmawan	19	1.72 m (5 ft 7 1/2 in)	Jakarta SCR
Laras Octa Ohndy	37	1.72 m (5 ft 7 1/2 in)	Central Java
Nathalie Kezia Susilo	25	1.68 m (5 ft 6 in)	Jakarta SCR
Olivia Pramaisella	29	1.70 m (5 ft 7 in)	Bangka Belitung
Ranida Asisyifa	18	1.70 m (5 ft 7 in)	West Kalimantan
Soraya Khairana Al-Rasyid	28	1.65 m (5 ft 5 in)	Banten
Zavia Puspo	21	1.65 m (5 ft 5 in)	Jakarta SCR
