= Miss Universe Indonesia 2024 =

2nd edition of the Miss Universe Indonesia competition

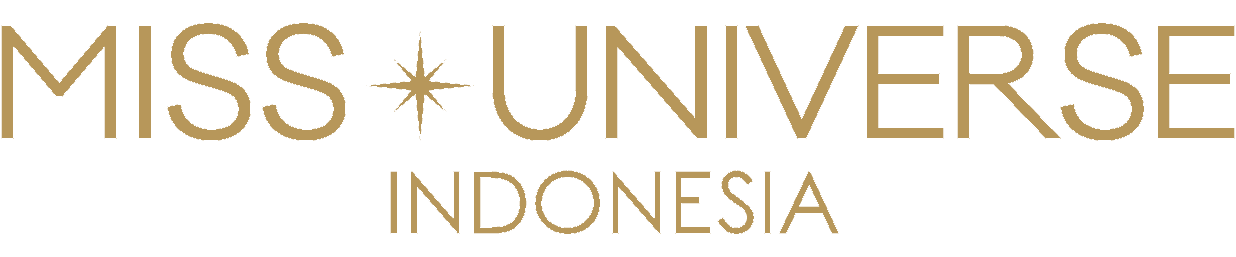
- Date: 19 September 2024
- Presenters: Okky Alparessi; Eveline Ong
- Entertainment: Dira Sugandi
- Theme: Inspiring the World With Indonesian Grace
- Venue: The H Club SCBD, Jakarta, Indonesia
- Broadcaster: Vidio
- Entrants: 14
- Placements: 6
- Winner: Clara Shafira Krebs; Banten

Miss Universe Indonesia 2024 was the 2nd Miss Universe Indonesia pageant, held at The H Club SCBD in Jakarta, Indonesia, on 19 September 2024.

Fabiënne Nicole Groeneveld of Jakarta SCR crowned Clara Shafira Krebs of Banten as her successor at the end of the event. Clara will represent Indonesia at Miss Universe 2024 in Mexico.

== Background ==
=== License change ===
Due to the sexual harassment scandal occurring during Poppy Capella's tenure as national director, Miss Universe Organization revoked PT. Capella Swastika Karya's license in August 2023. In July 2024, it was later revealed that the Miss Universe Organization has appointed Indonesian actor and businessman Teuku Jordan Zacky to act as the new national director.

=== Selection of participants ===
In addition to the removal of marital status restrictions that has been implemented since 2023, Miss Universe Indonesia also announced the removal of age restrictions for contestants over the age of 28, in accordance with the new Miss Universe rules. Other rule changes implemented include no height or weight restrictions for prospective applicants.

== Results ==
=== Placements ===
| Placement | Contestant |
|---|---|
| Miss Universe Indonesia 2024 | Clara Shafira Krebs |
| 1st Runner-Up | Fiza Javaid Khan |
| 2nd Runner-Up | Nadia Ingrida Tjuatja |
| Top 6 | Cinta Iole Amidjaja; Maria Ardelia Purwaningrum; Moriska |

=== Special awards ===
| Placement | Contestant |
|---|---|
| Best Performance | Nadia Ingrida Tjuatja |
| Best in Evening Gown | Putri Sulistiawati |
| Fanvote Winner | Maria Ardelia Purwaningrum |

== Pageant ==
=== Selection committee ===
- Sanjay Mulani – Casting director
- Soraya Haque – Actress, model, and academician
- Ria Juwita – Model and casting director
- Naomi Julia Soegianto – Founder and CEO of NJS Gold
- Jay Subyakto – Director and artistic director
- Alberthiene Endah – Biographer and writer
- Guruh Soekarnoputra – Artist and culturist
- Harry Halim – Fashion designer
- Alexander Sriewijono – People development consultant

== Delegates ==
The official Top 16 finalists were announced on 20 August. Originally chosen to be a part of the finalists, Karen Afralia Nijsen and Vina Anggi Sitorus later withdrew due to personal reasons.

Color key:

Withdrew from competition

| Delegate | Age | Height | Province |
|---|---|---|---|
| Beivy Marselo Mega Sumampouw | 24 | 1.58 m (5 ft 2 in) | Central Sulawesi |
| Cinta Iole Amidjaja | 27 | 1.65 m (5 ft 5 in) | Jakarta SCR |
| Clara Shafira Krebs | 22 | 1.73 m (5 ft 8 in) | Banten |
| Ester Liana | 27 | 1.69 m (5 ft 7 in) | Banten |
| Fiza Javaid Khan | 23 | 1.72 m (5 ft 8 in) | Jakarta SCR |
| Karen Afralia Nijsen | 24 | 1.70 m (5 ft 7 in) | West Sumatra |
| Khamelia Chalid | 29 | 1.66 m (5 ft 5 in) | Jakarta SCR |
| Maria Ardelia Purwaningrum | 36 | 1.70 m (5 ft 7 in) | Jakarta SCR |
| Meylan Fega | 30 | 1.66 m (5 ft 5 in) | North Sulawesi |
| Moriska | 27 | 1.73 m (5 ft 8 in) | West Sumatra |
| Nadia Ingrida Tjuatja | 30 | 1.73 m (5 ft 8 in) | East Java |
| Putri Sulistiawati | 21 | 1.71 m (5 ft 7 in) | West Java |
| Ravena Wulandari | 23 | 1.65 m (5 ft 5 in) | Aceh |
| Stella Vidyasari | 23 | 1.61 m (5 ft 3 in) | Riau Islands |
| Vina Anggi Sitorus | 25 | 1.69 m (5 ft 7 in) | North Sumatra |
| Viori Dhea Vanessa | 25 | 1.60 m (5 ft 3 in) | Riau |

=== Top 30 ===
The Top 30 semifinalists were announced on 14 August. The following 14 delegates did not advance to the top sixteen:

| Delegate | Age | Province |
|---|---|---|
| Aisyah Fatinah | 33 | Banten |
| Alana Panji Asmaradiva | 26 | East Java |
| Athalia Rebecca | 29 | Jakarta SCR |
| Erinna Terta Magee | 20 | Jakarta SCR |
| Gisela Gita Effendy | 29 | Jakarta SCR |
| Indah Rahmadani | 23 | West Kalimantan |
| Irene Cathrina Wiratno | 29 | Bali |
| Kamarah Trybuana Tungga Dewi | 20 | Jakarta SCR |
| Najwa Nayla Isyahbilla | 19 | North Sumatra |
| Nilam Onasis Sahputri | 20 | Jakarta SCR |
| Sofya Dewi Simanjuntak | 23 | West Java |
| Theresia Jenifer Sheren | 23 | Bali |
| Wulan Septiani | 29 | West Java |
| Yusavia Shiera | 24 | Banten |
