= Karolína Muchová =

Czech tennis player (born 1996)

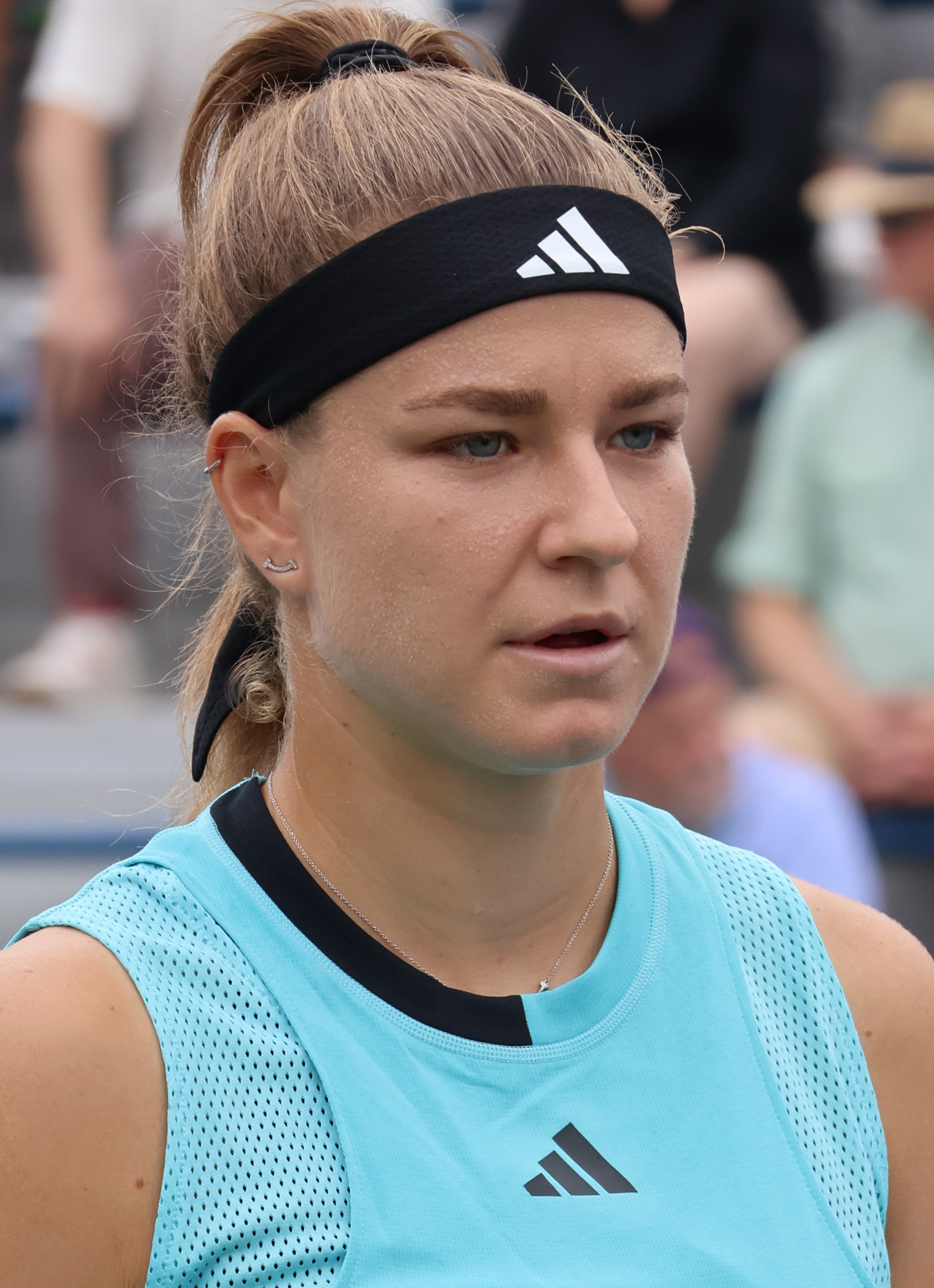
- Muchová at the 2023 US Open
- Country (sports): Czech Republic
- Born: 21 August 1996 (age 30) Olomouc, Czech Republic
- Height: 1.80 m (5 ft 11 in)
- Turned pro: 2013
- Plays: Right (two-handed backhand)
- Coach: Sven Groeneveld (2026–present)
- Prize money: $15,171,307

Singles
- Career record: 363–171
- Career titles: 3
- Highest ranking: No. 6 (13 July 2026)
- Current ranking: No. 8 (14 September 2026)

Grand Slam singles results
- Australian Open: SF (2021)
- French Open: F (2023)
- Wimbledon: F (2026)
- US Open: SF (2023, 2024)

Other tournaments
- Olympic Games: 1R (2024)

Doubles
- Career record: 44–36
- Career titles: 0
- Highest ranking: No. 156 (12 January 2026)
- Current ranking: No. 165 (14 September 2026)

Grand Slam doubles results
- Australian Open: 1R (2020)
- French Open: 1R (2019)
- US Open: 2R (2019)

Other doubles tournaments
- Olympic Games: SF (2024)

Grand Slam mixed doubles results
- US Open: W (2026)

Team competitions
- BJK Cup: W (2026), record 3–2
- Last updated on: 18 September 2026.

Karolína Muchová (Czech pronunciation: [ˈkaroliːna ˈmuxovaː]; born 21 August 1996) is a Czech professional tennis player. She has been ranked world No. 6 in women's singles by the Women's Tennis Association (WTA), achieved in July 2026, and No. 156 in women's doubles, reached in January 2026. Muchová has won three WTA Tour singles titles, including a WTA 1000 event at the 2026 Qatar Ladies Open. She has contested two major singles finals, at the 2023 French Open and 2026 Wimbledon Championships. She also won a mixed doubles title at the 2026 US Open, partnering Jakub Menšík.

Muchová turned professional in 2013. She made her major main-draw debut at the 2018 US Open, reaching the third round by defeating world No. 12 Garbiñe Muguruza. In 2019, she reached her first major quarterfinal at Wimbledon, upsetting No. 3, Karolína Plíšková, captured her first WTA Tour title at the Korea Open, and reached the semifinals at the WTA Elite Trophy. In 2021, she reached the semifinals at the Australian Open, defeating world No. 1, Ashleigh Barty, and later defeated world No. 2, Naomi Osaka. In 2023, she reached her first major final at the French Open and her first WTA 1000 final at the Cincinnati Open. In 2026, she won her first WTA 1000 title at the Qatar Ladies Open and reached her second major final at the Wimbledon Championships.

== Early life ==
Karolína Muchová was born in August 1996 in Olomouc, Czech Republic. Her father is former Czech footballer Josef Mucha. He introduced her to tennis at the age of seven. She also has a brother, with whom she did many sports when they were kids. Since there were tennis courts near her home, she decided to pick up a tennis racquet, and then when she was about 12, she chose tennis over handball. In 2019, she moved to Prague to train at the I. ČLTK Prague. She stated that her tennis idol growing up was Roger Federer. She struggled with a lot of injuries during her junior years.

== Career ==
=== 2013–2018: Breakthrough ===
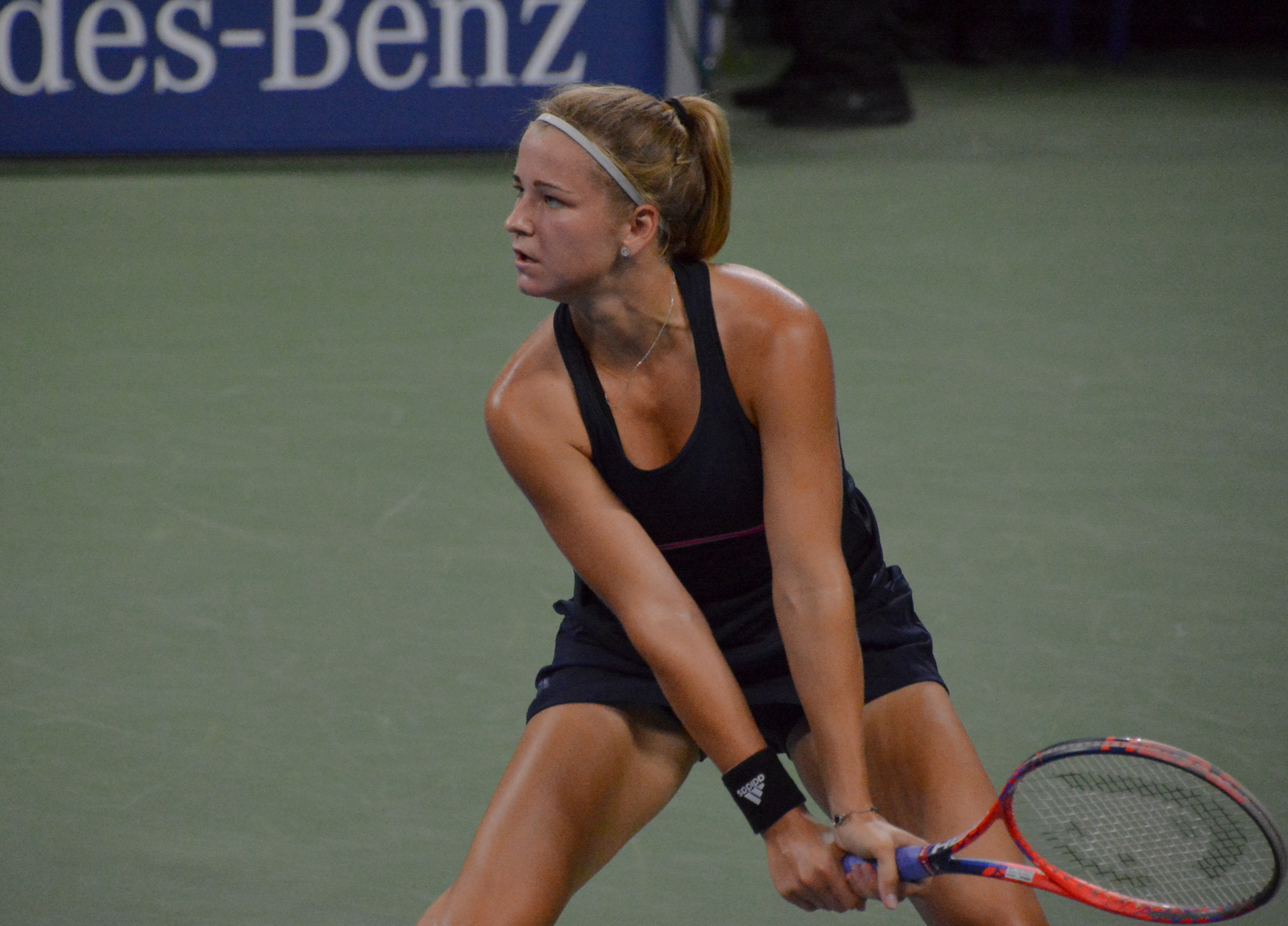
Muchová at the 2018 US Open

Muchová began playing on the ITF Women's Circuit in October 2013 at the age of 17. Her first tournament was a $10k event in Dubrovnik, where she reached the second round. In July the following year, she won her first ITF title in Michalovce, Slovakia. She then started to produce low-performances until March 2016, when she won her second singles title at Sharm El Sheikh, and two weeks later another event at the same venue. In July 2017, Muchová reached the final of the $75k ITS Cup in Olomouc, losing there to her countrymate Markéta Vondroušová. Muchová then made her WTA Tour main-draw debut at the 2017 Korea Open after defeating two low-ranked players, and then lost in the first round of the main draw to Priscilla Hon. Ranked No. 202, Muchová made her main-draw debut at a major event at the 2018 US Open winning three qualifying matches. After winning her opening-match against Dayana Yastremska, Muchová upset two-time Grand Slam champion and No. 12 Garbiñe Muguruza in the second round to score her first top-20 victory, advancing to the third round of the tournament. In the third round, she lost to No. 17 Ashleigh Barty.

=== 2019: Wimbledon quarterfinal, WTA 250 title ===
Muchová made her main-draw debut at the Australian Open after qualifying. She lost in the first round to No. 8 Karolína Plíšková. Still after qualifying, Muchová made her main-draw debut at the Premier events at the Qatar Open. She defeated lucky loser Samantha Stosur and Hsieh Su-wei to reach her first Premier-level quarterfinal. She lost in the quarterfinals to No. 7 Elina Svitolina in straight sets. Still after qualifying, she debuted at the Premier Mandatory events at the Miami Open. She defeated qualifier Nao Hibino before losing to No. 4 Angelique Kerber.

Muchová received a wildcard into the Prague Open where she defeated qualifier Iga Świątek, Jennifer Brady, Natalia Vikhlyantseva, and Bernarda Pera to reach her first WTA Tour final. In the final, she lost to qualifier Jil Teichmann in three sets. Nevertheless, her ranking rose to No. 74. At the French Open, she defeated No. 17 Anett Kontaveit before losing to Irina-Camelia Begu.

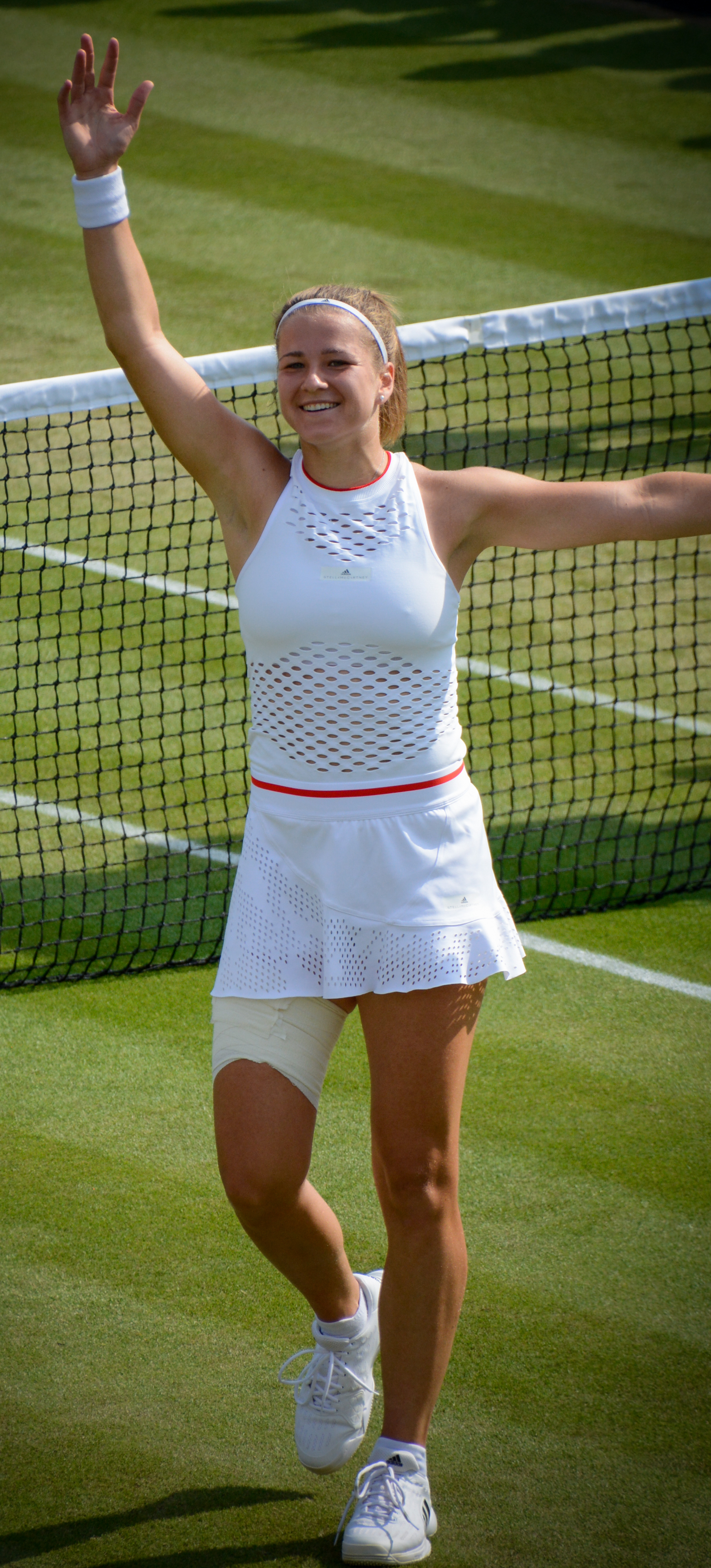
Muchová at Wimbledon, 2019

At the Wimbledon Championships, Muchová defeated Aleksandra Krunić, Madison Brengle, and No. 20 Anett Kontaveit to reach the fourth round. She defeated No. 3 Karolína Plíšková in a match that went to a third-set tiebreak and lasted three hours to claim her first top 10 victory and reach her first major quarterfinal. She lost in the quarterfinals to No. 8 Elina Svitolina in straight sets. Reaching the quarterfinals, she reached a career-high ranking of No. 43.

At the US Open, Muchová defeated qualifier Elena Rybakina and No. 28 Hsieh Su-wei, before losing to No. 8 Serena Williams.

At the Korea Open, Muchová beat Alison Van Uytvanck, qualifier Timea Babos, qualifier Priscilla Hon, and Wang Yafan to reach her second WTA Tour final in which she defeated Magda Linette in straight sets to claim her first career title. At the Kremlin Cup, Muchová eliminated Svetlana Kuznetsova, No. 21 Donna Vekić, and Ekaterina Alexandrova to reach the semifinals, before losing to Anastasia Pavlyuchenkova in three sets. At the end of the season, Muchová qualified for the WTA Elite Trophy for the first time. She defeated Sofia Kenin and Alison Riske to make the semifinals where she lost to Aryna Sabalenka, in straight sets. She finished the year as world No. 21.

=== 2020: US Open fourth round ===
In 2020, Muchová produced rather mixed results. At the Australian Open, she defeated Kirsten Flipkens, before losing to CiCi Bellis. At the Dubai Championships, she lost in the first round to qualifier Kateřina Siniaková. At the Qatar Ladies Open, she defeated Magda Linette but lost to No. 6, Kiki Bertens. After the six month suspension of the WTA Tour due to COVID-19 pandemic, Muchová first played at the Cincinnati Open and beat qualifier Ann Li, before losing to No. 10 Naomi Osaka. Her best performance of the season came at the US Open. She beat Venus Williams, Anna Kalinskaya, and Sorana Cîrstea to reach the fourth round, where she lost to No. 27 Victoria Azarenka in three sets. At the French Open, she lost in the first round to Christina McHale. At the Ostrava Open, she defeated Zhang Shuai, before losing to No. 21 Elise Mertens. However, she spent the whole year inside the top 30.

=== 2021: Australian Open semifinal, top 20 ===
At the Australian Open, Muchová defeated Jeļena Ostapenko, Mona Barthel, No. 6 Karolína Plíšková, and No. 16 Elise Mertens, without dropping a set, to reach her second major quarterfinal and her first at the Australian Open. She came back from a set down to upset world No. 1 Ashleigh Barty and reach her first major semifinal. In the semifinals, she lost to No. 24 Jennifer Brady in three sets.

At the Madrid Open, Muchová defeated Wang Qiang in the first round. In the second round, she upset world No. 2 Naomi Osaka in three sets. She defeated No. 16 Maria Sakkari to reach her first WTA 1000 quarterfinal. In the quarterfinals, she lost to Anastasia Pavlyuchenkova in straight sets. Nevertheless, she reached a new career-high ranking of No. 19. At the French Open, she defeated Andrea Petkovic and qualifier Varvara Lepchenko before losing to Sloane Stephens.

At the Wimbledon Championships, Muchová defeated Zhang Shuai, Camila Giorgi, No. 19 Anastasia Pavlyuchenkova, and Paula Badosa to reach her second consecutive Wimbledon quarterfinal. In the quarterfinals, she lost to No. 28 Angelique Kerber in straight sets.

At the US Open, Muchová was ousted in the first round by Sara Sorribes Tormo.

=== 2022: Multiple injuries, out of top 200 ===
Muchová didn't play at the Australian Open because of an injury. She came back at the Miami Open. She defeated Tereza Martincová and No. 22 Leylah Fernandez, but withdrew from her match against Naomi Osaka due to a left abdominal injury.

Using protected ranking at the Madrid Open, Muchová defeated wildcard entrant Zheng Qinwen before losing to No. 13 Belinda Bencic. In Rome, she lost in the first round to qualifier Petra Martić. At the French Open, she defeated wildcard entrant Carole Monnet and No. 3 Maria Sakkari to reach the third round. She retired during her match against No. 28 Amanda Anisimova due to thigh and ankle injuries.

At Wimbledon, Muchová lost in the first round to No. 18 Simona Halep. At the US Open, she lost in the first round to Ajla Tomljanović. Her ranking fell outside the top 200.

=== 2023: French Open final, top 10 ===
Muchová started the season in Auckland. She defeated Wang Xiyu and qualifier Elena-Gabriela Ruse to reach the quarterfinals, losing there to qualifier Rebeka Masarova in straight sets. Using protected ranking at the Australian Open, she defeated qualifier Lesia Tsurenko before losing to No. 13 Danielle Collins.

At the Dubai Championships, Muchová defeated Bernarda Pera, Sorana Cîrstea, and No. 8 Belinda Bencic, without dropping a set, to reach her second WTA 1000 quarterfinal. Although she withdrew from her quarterfinal match, her ranking rose to No. 76.

At the Indian Wells, Muchová defeated Yulia Putintseva, No. 14 Victoria Azarenka, No. 26 Martina Trevisan, and Markéta Vondroušová to reach her third WTA 1000 quarterfinal. Although losing to No. 10 and eventual champion Elena Rybakina in three sets, her ranking rose to No. 55. Entering the Miami Open after qualifying, she defeated Jil Teichmann and Zhu Lin before losing to Sorana Cîrstea.

Ranked No. 43 at the French Open, Muchová defeated No. 8 Maria Sakkari, Nadia Podoroska, No. 27 Irina-Camelia Begu and lucky loser Elina Avanesyan to reach her fourth major quarterfinal and her first at Roland Garros. She defeated Anastasia Pavlyuchenkova to reach her second major semifinal. She upset world No. 2, Aryna Sabalenka, in a three-set match lasting over three hours, saving a match point and recovering from 2–5 down in the final set to reach her first major final, becoming the fifth Czech player to reach the final at Roland Garros in the Open Era. She was the fourth-lowest-ranked women's finalist in the French Open history. In the final, she lost to world No. 1 and defending champion, Iga Świątek, in three sets. Nevertheless, she reached a new career-high ranking of No. 16.

At Wimbledon, Muchová lost in the first round to Jule Niemeier.

In Montreal, Muchová defeated No. 27 Anastasia Potapova, and Sorana Cîrstea before losing again to Iga Świątek, in three sets. In Cincinnati, Muchová defeated No. 19 Beatriz Haddad Maia, Petra Martić and No. 8 Maria Sakkari to reach her fourth WTA 1000 quarterfinal. She advanced to her first WTA 1000 semifinal as Marie Bouzková retired due to injury. In a rematch of their French Open semifinal, she upset world No. 2, Aryna Sabalenka, again in three sets to advance to her first WTA 1000 final. In the final, she lost to No. 7 Coco Gauff, in straight sets. Nevertheless, her ranking rose to the top 10.

At the US Open, Muchová defeated wildcard entrant Storm Hunter, Magdalena Fręch, Taylor Townsend, and Wang Xinyu to reach her fifth major quarterfinal and her first at US Open. She then quickly dispatched Sorana Cîrstea, only losing three games, to reach her second major semifinal of the season. In the semifinals, she lost again to No. 6 Coco Gauff in straight sets. Despite the loss, she reached a career-high ranking of No. 8.

Muchová qualified for the end-of-season WTA Finals for the first time, but was forced to withdraw from the tournament less than a week before it began due to a right wrist injury she suffered at the US Open.

=== 2024: US Open semifinal ===
Muchová withdrew from the Australian Open and in February 2024 underwent wrist surgery which made her skip the Middle Eastern swing and the USA Sunshine Double tournaments extending her hiatus. She made her return to the WTA Tour in June at the Eastbourne International. She defeated qualifiers Elina Avanesyan and Magda Linette to reach the quarterfinals, but withdrew from the next round due to a right wrist injury. At Wimbledon, she lost in the first round to Paula Badosa.

Muchová received a wildcard into the Palermo Ladies Open. She defeated Astra Sharma and Irina-Camelia Begu to reach the final. In the final, she lost to No. 7 Zheng Qinwen, in three sets. At the Paris Olympics, Muchová partnered up with compatriot Linda Nosková for the women’s doubles event. They reached the semifinals, losing to the eventual gold medalists Sara Errani and Jasmine Paolini of Italy.

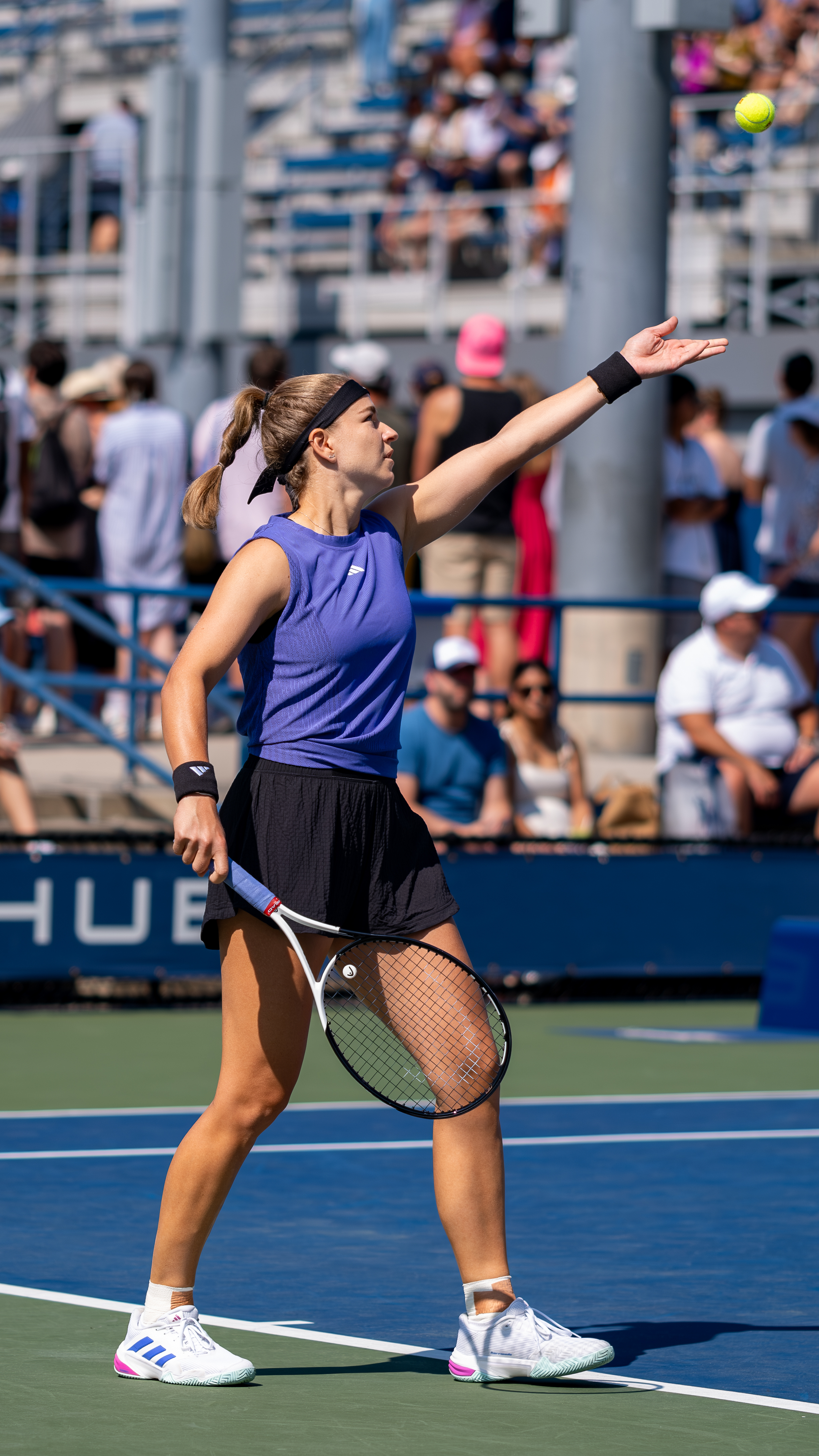
Muchová at the 2024 US Open

In Cincinnati, Muchová defeated Dayana Yastremska before losing to No. 6, Jessica Pegula, in three sets. At the US Open, Muchová defeated Katie Volynets, wildcard entrant Naomi Osaka, Anastasia Potapova, No. 5 Jasmine Paolini and No. 21 Beatriz Haddad Maia, without dropping a set, to reach the semifinal stage of the tournament for the second consecutive year. In the semifinals, she lost again to No. 6 Jessica Pegula in three sets.

At the China Open, Muchová defeated Anna Blinkova, Yuan Yue, Jaqueline Cristian, Cristina Bucșa, without dropping a set, to reach the quarterfinals. She upset world No. 2 Aryna Sabalenka in three sets to reach the semifinals. She defeated No. 7 Zheng Qinwen in straight sets to make her second WTA 1000 final. In the final, she lost to No. 6 Coco Gauff in straight sets. Muchová continued to have good form at the Ningbo Open. She overcame qualifier Olivia Gadecki, lucky loser Jaqueline Cristian and No. 12 Anna Kalinskaya to reach the semifinals. In the semifinals, she retired due to injury, after losing the first set to Mirra Andreeva.

=== 2025: US Open quarterfinal ===
Muchová represented Czech Republic at the 2025 United Cup. She defeated Malene Helgø and Jasmine Paolini to lead the Czech Republic into the semifinals. She lost her last group match against Iga Świątek and lost her semifinal match against Coco Gauff. At the Australian Open, she defeated Nadia Podoroska before losing to Naomi Osaka. At the Linz Open, Muchová defeated qualifier Sara Sorribes Tormo and Anastasia Potapova to make it through to the semifinals, where she lost to Ekaterina Alexandrova in straight sets.

At the Dubai Championships, Muchová defeated qualifier Suzan Lamens, wildcard entrant Emma Raducanu, and McCartney Kessler to reach the quarterfinals. She defeated wildcard entrant Sorana Cîrstea, winning her ninth straight tour-level quarterfinal (excluding her 2024 Easbourne walkover), to reach the semifinals. She lost in the semifinals to Clara Tauson in three sets.

At the Indian Wells, Muchová defeated Elisabetta Cocciaretto and Kateřina Siniaková to reach the fourth round, where she lost to world No. 2 Iga Świątek in straight sets. In Miami, she moved into the third round as Victoria Azarenka retired while trailing by a set. She lost in the third round to No. 22 Elina Svitolina.

At the French Open, Muchová lost in the first round to Alycia Parks. At Wimbledon, she lost in the first round to Wang Xinyu.

Muchová reached her third straight US Open quarterfinal with three-set wins over wildcard entrant Venus Williams, Sorana Cîrstea, Linda Nosková, and No. 28 Marta Kostyuk. She lost in the quarterfinals to No. 24 Naomi Osaka in straight sets.

=== 2026: Wimbledon final, WTA 1000 title ===
Muchová started the new season at Brisbane International. She came from a set down to defeat wildcard entrant Ajla Tomljanović in her opening match. She defeated No. 10 Ekaterina Alexandrova and No. 5 Elena Rybakina to reach the semifinals, where she lost to world No. 1 Aryna Sabalenka in straight sets. At the Australian Open, she defeated Jaqueline Cristian, Alycia Parks, and Magda Linette to reach the fourth round, where she lost to No. 3 Coco Gauff in three sets.

At the Qatar Ladies Open, Muchová defeated Jaqueline Cristian and qualifier Tereza Valentová to reach the third round. She reached the quarterfinals as Karolína Plíšková retired. She defeated Anna Kalinskaya in straight sets to reach the semifinals. She came from a set down to defeat Maria Sakkari and reach her third WTA 1000 final. In the final, she defeated No. 13 Victoria Mboko in straight sets to win her first WTA 1000 title and her second WTA Tour title after the 2019 Korea Open.

At the Indian Wells, Muchová defeated Anna Bondár and Antonia Ružić, before losing to world No. 2, Iga Świątek, in straight sets. At the Miami Open, Muchová came from a set down to defeat Camila Osorio in her opening match. She defeated Katie Boulter, No. 29 Alexandra Eala, and No. 9 Victoria Mboko in straight sets to reach the semifinals, where she lost again to Coco Gauff, in straight sets.

At the Stuttgart Open, Muchová defeated qualifier Aliaksandra Sasnovich in the first round. She came from a set down to defeat Elise Mertens and reach the quarterfinals. In the quarterfinals, she snapped a losing streak of six matches against No. 3 Coco Gauff. In the semifinals, she defeated No. 7, Elina Svitolina, in three sets. In the final, she lost to No. 2 Elena Rybakina in straight sets.

At the French Open, Muchová defeated Anastasia Zakharova and Kamilla Rakhimova, before losing to Jil Teichmann.

At the Berlin Tennis Open, Muchová partnered with 23-time major singles champion Serena Williams, but the pair lost in the first round. At the same tournament in singles, she defeated qualifier Zhang Shuai, before losing to Madison Keys. At the Bad Homburg Open, Muchová defeated qualifier Irina-Camelia Begu to reach the quarterfinals. She came from a set down to defeat Clara Tauson and reach the semifinals, where she defeated qualifier Elena-Gabriela Ruse in straight sets. She went on to win the title as No. 15 Naomi Osaka retired due to a foot injury. This marked her second title of the year and her first grass-court singles title.

At the Wimbledon Championships, Muchová managed to beat three Grand Slam champions to reach her second major final and her first at Wimbledon: compatriot Barbora Krejčíková in the fourth round in three sets, Naomi Osaka in the quarterfinals, and Coco Gauff in the semifinals in three sets. After her run at the tournament, she has reached the semifinals of all four major tournaments. She matched with fellow Czech and No. 12 Linda Nosková in the final, but lost to her opponent in three sets. Reaching the final, she attained a new career-high ranking of No. 6 in the world.

Partnering with Jakub Menšík, Muchová won the mixed doubles competition at the 2026 US Open. The Czech pair saved match points in both their semifinal victory over Andrey Rublev and Mirra Andreeva, and again in the final against Flavio Cobolli and Belinda Bencic. Victory marked her first at a major. In the singles draw, she defeated Sinja Kraus and Katie Boulter before losing to No. 27 Emma Navarro.

At the China Open, Muchová defeated Katie Boulter, Liudmila Samsonova, and No. 17 Naomi Osaka to reach the quarterfinals, where she lost to Nikola Bartůňková in straight sets.

Muchová qualified for WTA Finals for the second time. She was eliminated by Aryna Sabalenka and Elina Svitolina in the round-robin stage.

== Playing style and coaching ==
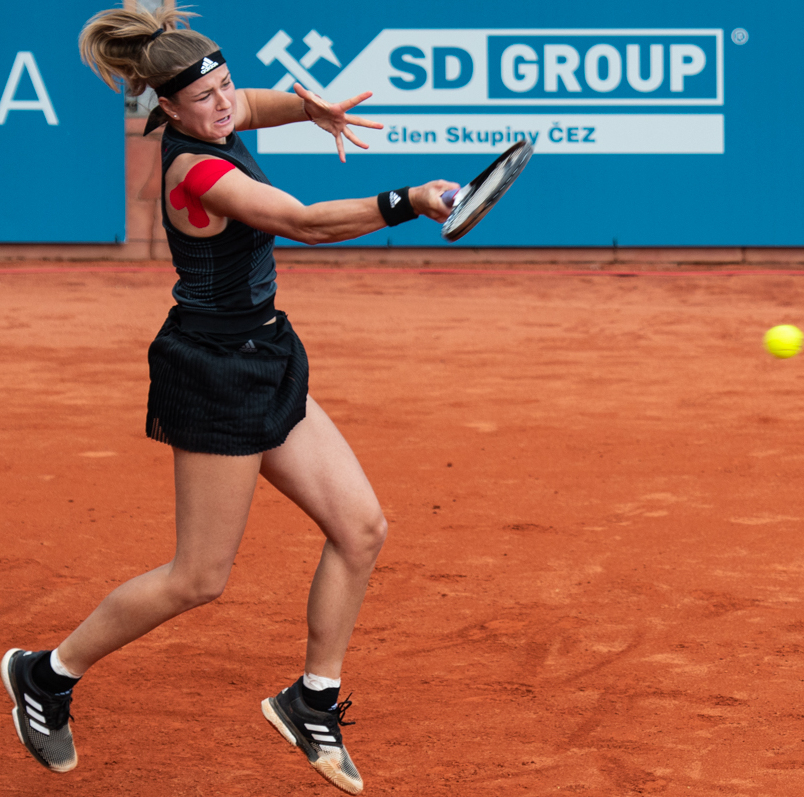
Muchová hitting a forehand

Muchová plays an aggressive all-court game, characterized by a variety of shots. She hits groundstrokes with sufficient depth and power from both the forehand and backhand sides to generate winners from any position on the court. She has been praised for her ability to incorporate softer shots, such as drop shots, lobs, and sliced backhands, into her game, constantly breaking up the pace of baseline rallies, and being able to hit winners with these typically defensive shots. Her first serve averages 103 mph (166 km/h) and peaks at 110 mph (180 km/h), allowing her to serve aces frequently; she also possesses a second serve that, despite averaging 83 mph (134 km/h), possesses a high amount of topspin, meaning that it can be deployed effectively without being attacked by aggressive players. Muchová is also proficient at defending her second serve. Her footwork, speed, and anticipation allow her to be one of the strongest return players on the WTA Tour. Physically, her conditioning allows her to sustain long rallies, and is an effective counterpuncher, waiting for openings hit winners. Additionally, her experience in doubles contributes to her net play making her a frequent and effective volleyer when moving forward to finish points.

Muchová has had several coaches in her career: Emil Miške (2017–2019, Apr 2023–), David Kotyza (2020 – Aug 2022), Jan Blecha (Sep 2022 – Apr 2023), Kirsten Flipkens (2023–2025) and Sven Groeneveld since January 2026.

== Endorsements ==
Muchová is sponsored by Adidas for her attire and by Head for her rackets.

== Career statistics ==
=== Grand Slam singles performance timeline ===
Key
W	F	SF	QF	#R	RR	Q#	DNQ	A	NH

(W) winner; (F) finalist; (SF) semifinalist; (QF) quarterfinalist; (#R) rounds 4, 3, 2, 1; (RR) round-robin stage; (Q#) qualification round; (DNQ) did not qualify; (A) absent; (NH) not held; (SR) strike rate (events won / competed); (W–L) win–loss record.
To avoid confusion and double counting, these charts are updated at the conclusion of a tournament or when the player's participation has ended.

Tournament	2016	2017	2018	2019	2020	2021	2022	2023	2024	2025	2026	SR	W–L	Win %
Australian Open	A	A	A	1R	2R	SF	A	2R	A	2R	4R	0 / 6	11–6	65%
French Open	A	A	Q1	2R	1R	3R	3R	F	A	1R	3R	0 / 7	13–7	65%
Wimbledon	A	A	Q2	QF	NH	QF	1R	1R	1R	1R	F	0 / 7	14–7	67%
US Open	Q1	A	3R	3R	4R	1R	1R	SF	SF	QF	3R	0 / 9	23–9	72%
Win–Loss	0–0	0–0	2–1	7–4	4–3	11–4	2–3	12–4	5–2	5–4	13–4	0 / 29	61–29	68%

=== Grand Slam tournament finals ===
==== Singles: 2 (2 runner-ups) ====
Result	Year	Tournament	Surface	Opponent	Score
Loss	2023	French Open	Clay	(Poland) Iga Świątek	2–6, 7–5, 4–6
Loss	2026	Wimbledon	Grass	(Czech Republic) Linda Nosková	2–6, 7–5, 3–6

==== Mixed doubles: 1 (title) ====
Result	Year	Tournament	Surface	Partner	Opponents	Score
Win	2026	US Open	Hard	(Czech Republic) Jakub Menšík	(Switzerland) Belinda Bencic (Italy) Flavio Cobolli	6–3, 1–6, [10–6]

=== Olympic medal matches ===
==== Doubles: 1 (4th place) ====
Result	Year	Tournament	Surface	Partner	Opponents	Score
4th place	2024	Paris Olympics	Clay	(Czech Republic) Linda Nosková	(Spain) Cristina Bucșa (Spain) Sara Sorribes Tormo	2–6, 2–6
