= Sanly Liu =

Indonesian model and internet personality (born 1996)

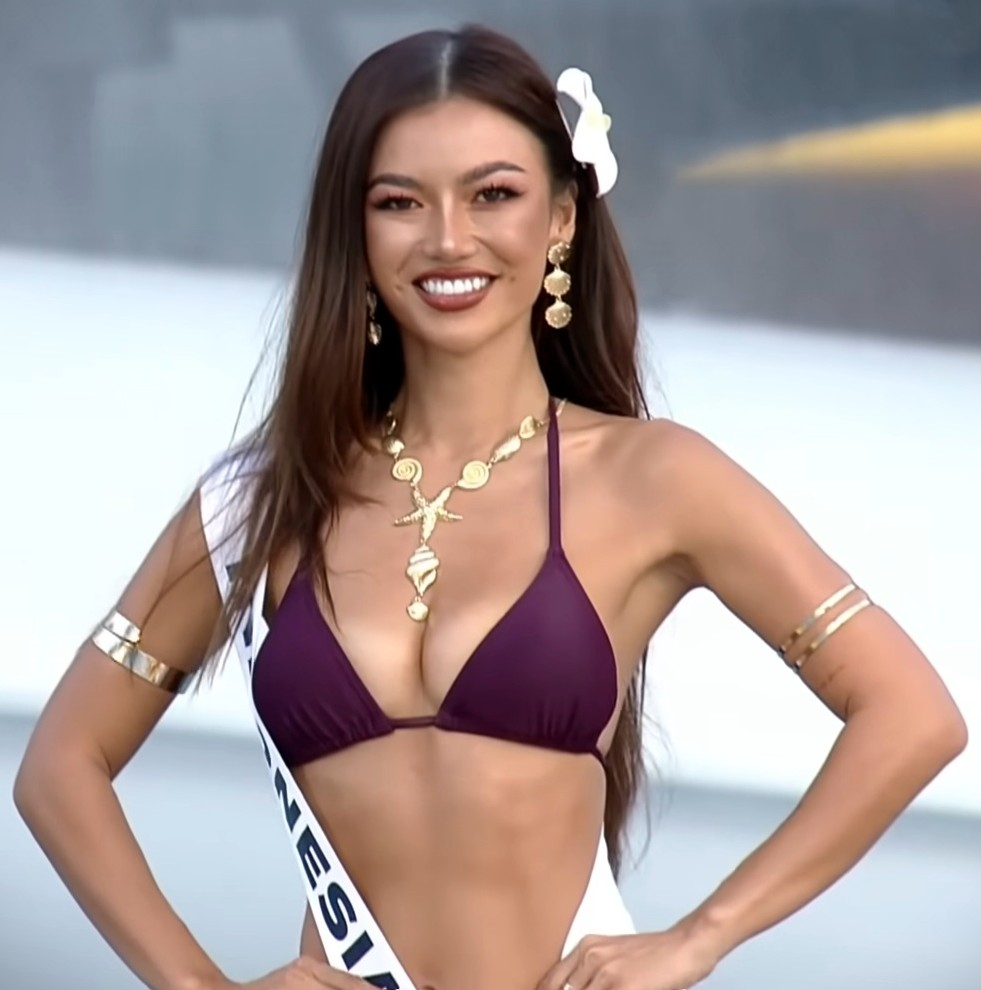
- Liu at Miss Universe 2025
- Born: Sanly Hendrawati; May 10, 1996 (age 30); Jakarta, Indonesia
- Other name: Sanly Liu
- Occupations: Entrepreneur; Beauty pageant titleholder
- Height: 170 cm (5 ft 7 in)
- Beauty pageant titleholder
- Title: Miss Universe Indonesia 2025
- Hair color: Black
- Eye color: Black
- Major competitions: Miss Universe Indonesia 2025; (Winner); Miss Universe 2025; (Unplaced)

Sanly Hendrawati (born 10 May 1996), also known as Sanly Liu, is an Indonesian internet personality, entrepreneur, and beauty pageant titleholder.

She began her career as a beauty vlogger. She won Miss Universe Indonesia 2025 and represented Indonesia at Miss Universe 2025 in Thailand.

== Early life and career ==
Sanly Hendrawati was born in Jakarta, Indonesia. She later lived in Bali, where she worked as a content creator focused on fashion and beauty. She has also been involved in business activities in the fashion and hospitality sectors.

== Pageantry ==
=== Miss Universe Indonesia 2025 ===
Sanly won her first pageant Miss Universe Indonesia, held on September 22, 2025 at The Tribrata, Jakarta. She was crowned by her predecessor Clara Shafira Krebs.

=== Miss Universe 2025 ===
Sanly represented Indonesia at Miss Universe 2025 in Thailand on November 21, 2025. She did not place in the competition.

Awards and achievements
Preceded by Clara Shafira Krebs, Banten	Miss Universe Indonesia; 2025	Incumbent
