= Sven Groeneveld =

Dutch tennis player and coach

- Born: 22 July 1965 (age 61); Haarlem, Netherlands
- Occupation: Tennis coach

Sven Groeneveld (born 22 July 1965) is a Dutch tennis coach and a former professional player.

== Career ==
He became a professional tennis player at the age of 19, but couldn't achieve much success. His highest singles ranking was 826 and highest doubles ranking was 837 in 1986.

In 1989, he ended his tennis career and became a coach. He has coached a variety of players, including Monica Seles, Arantxa Sánchez Vicario, Mary Pierce, Ana Ivanovic, Caroline Wozniacki, Michael Stich, Greg Rusedski, Nicolas Kiefer, Tommy Haas, Maria Sharapova, and Mario Ančić. He is also the former head of the Swiss Tennis federation.

From May 2019 to October 2022, he was the coach of Bianca Andreescu. Groeneveld made the split between him and Andreescu public, stating that he was looking for a new challenge.

In May 2023, Groeneveld started working with the Dutch tennis player Botic van de Zandschulp.

In Jan 2026, Groeneveld started working with the Czech player Karolina Muchova and guided her to her first Wimbledon final that summer.

== Personal life ==
Groeneveld is in a relation with Dutch choreographer Nanine Linning.
