= Clara Shafira Krebs =

Indonesian beauty pageant titleholder (born 2002)

- Born: Clara Shafira Krebs; May 19, 2002 (age 24); Germany
- Education: Pelita Harapan University (B.IBM)
- Occupations: Beauty pageant titleholder; model; entrepreneur
- Height: 1.73 m (5 ft 8 in)
- Beauty pageant titleholder
- Title: Miss Universe Indonesia 2024
- Major competitions: Miss Universe Indonesia 2024; (Winner); Miss Universe 2024; (Unplaced)

Clara Shafira Krebs (German pronunciation: [ˈklaːʁa ʃaˈfiːʁa kχeːps]; born May 19, 2002), also known as Clara Sha, is an Indonesian beauty pageant titleholder, model, and entrepreneur who won Miss Universe Indonesia 2024. She represented Indonesia at Miss Universe 2024 in Mexico.

== Early life and education ==
Clara Shafira Krebs was born on May 19, 2002, in Germany to a German father and an Indonesian mother. While she spent most of her childhood and teenage years in Germany, she often visited Indonesia to see her relatives.

In 2019, she returned to Indonesia with her mother for a vacation, and was unable to return to Germany the following year due to the COVID pandemic. She then remained in Indonesia, where she attended university and pursued modelling. After spending four years in Indonesia, she chose Indonesian nationality over German and remained in the country.

Krebs has worked as a model since she was 17 years old and often endorses various brand products and local fashion on instagram. In 2023, she modeled for Uniqlo fashion collection.

Krebs graduated cum laude from Pelita Harapan University in May 2024 after attending the International Business Management program for three and a half years.

== Pageantry ==
=== Miss Universe Indonesia 2024 ===
Krebs won her first pageant Miss Universe Indonesia, held on September 19, 2024, at The H Club SCBD in Jakarta. She was crowned by her predecessor Fabiënne Groeneveld. She represented Indonesia at Miss Universe 2024 in Mexico on November 16, 2024.

During the bootcamp, she won first place in the Notion Knock-out challenge, where the finalists spoke about current issues in the world.

Krebs advanced to the top three, where fashion designer Harry Halim asked her: "How would you navigate a situation where a major brand offers you a lucrative partnership with significant future potential–but the brand is associated with supporting severe human rights violation, and refusing the offer would negatively impact your career?" She answered:

When it comes to making decisions in my career, I plan this out very thoroughly. I use my social media to influence others, so I am very thorough in choosing what brands I promote, what content I create, and what I choose to share with the world. As a social media influencer and also a mental health advocate, I choose my words thoroughly and I choose what I promote because I believe that we have influence with what we use in social media, so when it comes to how I can navigate my career, I would definitely choose things that align with my values. So I do not support brands that do not add up with my values, such as anything like discrimination that goes against human rights, and anything of that kind. I do not support it.

== Advocacy and platform ==
Krebs has advocated for mental health awareness and women empowerment through her platform Our Safe Space and SHApe Your Mind movement, where she campaigns for the importance of mental health and provides a safe space for women to share their experiences, find inspirations in others, and seek mental support. With her advocacy, she aims to improve the mental well-being and entrepreneurship skills of young women.

== Other ventures ==
Krebs has launched several businesses, including her own fashion brand Lucille The Label, which specializes in women's casual wear and accessories inspired by European fashion, a gown rental boutique named Me To You, and a villa rental business named Villa Waturenggong in Ubud, Bali.

== See also ==
- Indonesia at the Big Four beauty pageants

Awards and achievements
Preceded by Fabiënne Groeneveld, Jakarta	Miss Universe Indonesia; 2024	Succeeded by Sanly Liu, Bali
