= Poppy Capella =

Indonesian former pageant director, actress, and singer

Yang Berbahagia Datin Wira Poppy Capella
- Born: Poppy Capella Swastika; October 22, 1991 (age 34); Surabaya, East Java, Indonesia
- Occupations: Actress; singer; businesswoman
- Spouse: Datuk Wira Justin Lim Hwa-Tat (m. 2019)

Datin Wira Poppy Capella Swastika (born October 22, 1991) (née Tan), often styled as Madame Poppy Capella, is an Indonesian former pageant director, singer, actress, and businesswoman. She grew up in Singapore and moved back to Indonesia, where she became a singer and actress. Capella was formerly the national director of Miss Universe Indonesia and Miss Universe Malaysia beauty pageants under PT. Capella Swastika Karya organization, where she also served as chairman.

== Early life ==
Capella was born in Surabaya, East Java, Indonesia to a Catholic parents of Chinese descent; Ryo Capello Tan Hok-Sie, from Surabaya and Isabella Ongkowidjaja, from Denpasar. She moved to Singapore in 1997 together with her family. She is the eldest sibling of two younger sisters. Initially, her father, working as an interior-architect decided to take her to Singapore on a promise of temporary vacation. As a young student, Capella finished her study at Cedar Girls' Secondary School in Singapore, and later found her interest in acting and singing Indonesian folk music Dangdut.

After high school, Capella enrolled in Yong Siew Toh Conservatory of Music of National University of Singapore, Singapore to continue her BMus. Bachelor of Music (Honours) in Music and Society. In 2012, she gained a popularity after releasing her first single named "Bukan Seperti Film", "Honey Bunny" and a duo collaboration with Ayu Ting Ting in "Ta..Ti..Tut" directed by her aunt Inul Daratista. In 2019, Capella married Datuk Wira Justin Lim Hwa-Tat, a prominent Malaysian political figure and businessman at the St Andrew's Cathedral, Singapore, thereby sharing in two children. Capella and her husband are well-experienced in various fields such as Shipping, Commodities, Structured Financing, Fund Raising, Aviation and Trading Sectors.

== Miss Universe Indonesia and Malaysia ==
On 8 February 2023, a new Miss Universe Indonesia organization was formed under the same ownership with Miss Universe Malaysia. The license is owned by Capella, which is also the national director of the pageant under PT. Capella Swastika Karya and Just Capella Sdn. Bhd. management. The press launch of the pageants was attended by the Miss Universe 2022 R'Bonney Gabriel, 2nd runner-up and top 5 of Miss Universe 2022, Andreína Martínez and Gabriëla Dos Santos, respectively.

== Discography ==
Capella is also a singer songwriter, who has released several singles since 2012, she was debuted under her own aunt Inul Daratista management.

=== Music videos ===
Year	Title	Record label	Ref.
2012	Bukan Seperti Film "Not like a Movie"	Nagaswara	
2012	Honey Bunny	Nagaswara	
2018	Ta..Ti..Tut	Media Nusantara Citra	
2021	And I'm Going Down	Universal Music Indonesia	

== See also ==
- Miss Universe Indonesia
- Miss Universe Malaysia
